= 2015 in paleoentomology =

2015 in paleoentomology is a list of new fossil insect taxa that were described during the year 2015, as well as other significant discoveries and events related to paleoentomology that occurred during the year.

== Clade Amphiesmenoptera ==
=== Lepidoptera ===
Name	Novelty	Status	Authorship of new name	Age	Unit	Location	Notes	Images
Aclemus	Gen. et sp. nov	Valid	Zhang et al.	Middle Jurassic	Jiulongshan Formation	China	A member of Lepidoptera belonging to the family Eolepidopterigidae. The type species is Aclemus patulus.	
Bucculatrix rycki	Sp. nov	Valid	Fischer	Eocene		Russia (Kaliningrad Oblast)	A ribbed cocoon maker moth found in Baltic amber.	
Electrocrania michalskii	Sp. nov	Valid	Kurz	Eocene		Europe (Baltic Sea coast)	A member of Lepidoptera belonging to the family Micropterigidae found in Baltic amber, a species of Electrocrania.	

=== Trichopterans ===
Name	Novelty	Status	Authorship of new name	Age	Unit	Location	Notes	Images
Yantarocentrus	Gen. et sp. nov	Valid	Ivanov & Melnitsky	Eocene		Russia (Kaliningrad Oblast)	A caddisfly found in Baltic amber. The type species is Yantarocentrus gusakovi.	

== Clade Antliophora ==
=== Dipterans ===
Name	Novelty	Status	Authorship of new name	Age	Unit	Location	Notes	Images
Anthrax succini	Sp. nov	Valid	Greenwalt & Evenhuis in Greenwalt, Wingerath & Evenhuis	Miocene	Dominican amber	Dominican Republic	A bee fly found in Dominican amber, a species of Anthrax.	
Antohelia	Gen. et sp. nov	Valid	Kania	Eocene		Europe (Baltic Sea coast)	A limoniid fly found in Baltic amber. The type species is Antohelia stanislawi.	
Archiculicoides andersoni	Sp. nov	Valid	Szadziewski, Ross & Giłka	Late Cretaceous	Burmese amber	Myanmar	A ceratopogonid midge. Originally described as a species of Archiculicoides; Borkent (2019) transferred this species to the genus Archiaustroconops.	
Axenotrichomyia	Gen. et sp. nov	Valid	Azar et al.	Late Cretaceous (Cenomanian)	Burmese amber	Myanmar	A trichomyiine psychodid fly. The type species is Axenotrichomyia boisteli.	
Bamara	Gen. et sp. nov	Valid	Stebner et al.	Late Cretaceous (earliest Cenomanian)	Burmese amber	Myanmar	A moth fly. The type species is Bamara groehni.	
Bryophaenocladius beuki	Sp. nov	Valid	Baranov, Andersen & Hagenlund	Eocene		Lithuania	An orthoclad found in Baltic amber, probably a species of Bryophaenocladius.	
Buccinatormyia	Gen. et 2 sp. nov	Valid	Arillo, Peñalver & Pérez-de la Fuente in Arillo et al.	Early Cretaceous (Albian)	Las Peñosas Formation	Spain	A zhangsolvid stratiomyomorph. Genus contains two species: Buccinatormyia magnifica and B. soplaensis.	
Cretolimonia excelsa	Sp. nov	Valid	Gao et al.	Middle Jurassic	Jiulongshan Formation	China	A member of Limoniidae, a species of Cretolimonia.	
Dactylolabis (Idiolabis) ryszardi	Sp. nov	Valid	Kania & Krzemiński	Eocene		Europe (Baltic Sea coast)	A dactylolabine limoniid fly found in Baltic amber, a species of Dactylolabis.	
Datzia	Gen. et 2 sp. nov	Valid	Stebner et al.	Late Cretaceous (earliest Cenomanian)	Burmese amber	Myanmar	A moth fly. The type species is Datzia bispina; genus also contains Datzia setosa.	
Dicranomyia herczeki	Sp. nov	Valid	Krzemiński & Kania in Krzemiński, Kania & Durak	Eocene		Europe (Baltic Sea coast)	A limoniid fly found in Baltic amber, a species of Dicranomyia.	
Dicranoptycha burmitica	Sp. nov	Valid	Kania, Wang & Szwedo	Late Cretaceous (earliest Cenomanian)	Burmese amber	Myanmar	A limoniid crane fly, a species of Dicranoptycha.	
Elephantomyia (Elephantomyia) bozenae	Sp. nov	Valid	Kania	Eocene	Baltic amber	Europe	A limoniid fly.	Elephantomyia bozenae
Elephantomyia (Elephantomyia) irinae	Sp. nov	Valid	Kania	Eocene	Baltic amber	Europe	A limoniid fly.	Elephantomyia irinae
Eoanomala	Gen. et sp. nov	Valid	Greenwalt & Evenhuis in Greenwalt, Wingerath & Evenhuis	Eocene (Lutetian)	Kishenehn Formation	United States	A bee fly. The type species is Eoanomala melas.	
Eonandeva	Gen. et 2 sp. nov	Valid	Zakrzewska & Giłka	Eocene		Europe (Baltic Sea coast)	A member of Chironomidae belonging to the tribe Tanytarsini found in Baltic amber. The type species is Eonandeva helva; genus also contains Eonandeva latistyla.	
Eoptychoptera braziliana	Sp. nov	Valid	Krzemiński, Kania & Lukashevich	Early Cretaceous	Santana Formation	Brazil	A ptychopterid fly, a species of Eoptychoptera.	
Eotipula grangeri	Sp. nov	Valid	Oberprieler et al.	Late Jurassic	Talbragar Fish Bed	Australia	A crane fly, a species of Eotipula.	
Epimesoplecia ambloneura	Sp. nov	Valid	Lin, Shih & Ren	Middle Jurassic (late Callovian)	Jiulongshan Formation	China	A protopleciid nematoceran, a species of Epimesoplecia.	
Epimesoplecia macrostrena	Sp. nov	Valid	Lin, Shih & Ren	Middle Jurassic (late Callovian)	Jiulongshan Formation	China	A protopleciid nematoceran, a species of Epimesoplecia.	
Epimesoplecia plethora	Sp. nov	Valid	Lin, Shih & Ren	Middle Jurassic (late Callovian)	Jiulongshan Formation	China	A protopleciid nematoceran, a species of Epimesoplecia.	
Epimesoplecia prosoneura	Sp. nov	Valid	Lin, Shih & Ren	Middle Jurassic (late Callovian)	Jiulongshan Formation	China	A protopleciid nematoceran, a species of Epimesoplecia.	
Epimesoplecia stana	Sp. nov	Valid	Lin, Shih & Ren	Middle Jurassic (late Callovian)	Jiulongshan Formation	China	A protopleciid nematoceran, a species of Epimesoplecia.	
Eugenodiamesa	Gen. et sp. nov	Valid	Lukashevich & Przhiboro	Early Cretaceous (Berriasian or Valanginian)	Tsagan Tsab Formation	Mongolia	A diamesine chironomid fly. The type species is Eugenodiamesa makarchenkoi.	
Gonomyia (Azaria) libanensis	Subgen. and sp. nov	Valid	Kania, Krzemiński & Krzemińska	Early Cretaceous		Lebanon	A limoniid fly, a species of Gonomyia.	
Greniera ukrainica	Sp. nov	Valid	Perkovsky & Sukhomlin	Late Eocene		Ukraine	A black fly found in Rovno amber, a species of Greniera.	
Greniera yankovskyi	Sp. nov	Valid	Perkovsky & Sukhomlin	Late Eocene		Ukraine	A black fly found in Rovno amber, a species of Greniera.	
Gulyankiola	Gen. et sp. nov	Valid	Fedotova & Perkovsky	Late Eocene		Ukraine	A gall midge found in Rovno amber. The type species is Gulyankiola nazarenkoi.	
Hellichiella pugach	Sp. nov	Junior synonym	Perkovsky & Sukhomlin	Late Eocene		Ukraine	A black fly found in Rovno amber. Originally described as a species of Hellichiella; Perkovsky & Sukhomlin (2016) transferred it to the genus Greniera and considered it to be a junior synonym of Greniera yankovskyi.	
Heterotrissocladius naibuchi	Sp. nov	Valid	Baranov, Andersen & Perkovsky	Middle Eocene		Russia	An orthoclad, a species of Heterotrissocladius.	
Lebanoculicoides bloudani	Sp. nov	Valid	Choufani et al.	Early Cretaceous		Lebanon; Syria	A member of Ceratopogonidae, a species of Lebanoculicoides.	
Leptoconops ellenbergeri	Sp. nov	Valid	Szadziewski in Szadziewski, Giłka & Urbanek	Late Cretaceous (Cenomanian)	Burmese amber	Myanmar	A member of Ceratopogonidae, a species of Leptoconops.	
Leptotarsus lukashevichae	Sp. nov	Valid	Ribeiro, Santos & Nicolau	Early Cretaceous	Crato Formation	Brazil	A crane fly, a species of Leptotarsus (sensu lato).	
Leptotarsus (Longurio) primitivus	Sp. nov	Valid	Shih et al.	Early Cretaceous	Yixian Formation	China	A crane fly, a species of Leptotarsus.	
Linguatormyia	Gen. et sp. nov	Valid	Grimaldi in Arillo et al.	Cretaceous (late Albian–early Cenomanian)	Burmese amber	Myanmar	A zhangsolvid stratiomyomorph. The type species is Linguatormyia teletacta.	
Mandalayia	Gen. et sp. nov	Valid	Stebner et al.	Late Cretaceous (earliest Cenomanian)	Burmese amber	Myanmar	A moth fly. The type species is Mandalayia beumersorum.	
Mesotipula gloriosa	Sp. nov	Valid	Gao et al.	Middle Jurassic	Jiulongshan Formation	China	A member of Limoniidae, a species of Mesotipula.	
Nemopalpus quadrispiculatus	Sp. nov	Valid	Stebner et al.	Late Cretaceous (earliest Cenomanian)	Burmese amber	Myanmar	A moth fly. Originally described as a species of Nemopalpus, but subsequently transferred to the genus Palaeoglaesum.	
Orentalphila	Gen. et 2 sp. nov	Valid	Lin, Shih & Ren	Early Cretaceous	Yixian Formation	China	A mesosciophilid nematoceran. Genus contains two species: Orentalphila gravia and O. caloa.	
Palaeoparasycorax	Gen. et 2 sp. nov	Valid	Stebner et al.	Late Cretaceous (earliest Cenomanian)	Burmese amber	Myanmar	A moth fly. The type species is Palaeoparasycorax globosus; genus also contains Palaeoparasycorax suppus.	
Paramesosciophilodes bellus	Sp. nov	Valid	Gao et al.	Middle Jurassic	Jiulongshan Formation	China	A mesosciophilid nematoceran, a species of Paramesosciophilodes.	
Paramesosciophilodes rarissima	Sp. nov	Valid	Gao et al.	Middle Jurassic	Jiulongshan Formation	China	A mesosciophilid nematoceran, a species of Paramesosciophilodes.	
Paraphaenocladius nadezhdae	Sp. nov	Valid	Baranov, Andersen & Perkovsky	Middle Eocene		Russia	An orthoclad, a species of Paraphaenocladius.	
Parasycorax simplex	Sp. nov	Valid	Stebner et al.	Late Cretaceous (earliest Cenomanian)	Burmese amber	Myanmar	A moth fly, a species of Parasycorax.	
Phlebotomites aphoe	Sp. nov	Valid	Stebner et al.	Late Cretaceous (earliest Cenomanian)	Burmese amber	Myanmar	A moth fly, a species of Phlebotomites.	
Phlebotomus vetus	Sp. nov	Valid	Stebner et al.	Late Cretaceous (earliest Cenomanian)	Burmese amber	Myanmar	A moth fly, a species of Phlebotomus.	
Praearchitipula apprima	Sp. nov	Valid	Gao et al.	Middle Jurassic	Jiulongshan Formation	China	A member of Pediciidae, a species of Praearchitipula.	
Praearchitipula mirabilis	Sp. nov	Valid	Gao et al.	Middle Jurassic	Jiulongshan Formation	China	A member of Pediciidae, a species of Praearchitipula.	
Praemacrochile dryasis	Sp. nov	Valid	Dong et al.	Middle Jurassic	Jiulongshan Formation	China	A member of Tanyderidae, a species of Praemacrochile.	
Praemacrochile ovalum	Sp. nov	Valid	Dong et al.	Middle Jurassic	Jiulongshan Formation	China	A member of Tanyderidae, a species of Praemacrochile.	
Protanyderus astictum	Sp. nov	Valid	Dong et al.	Middle Jurassic	Jiulongshan Formation	China	A member of Tanyderidae, a species of Protanyderus.	
Pseudapiocera	Gen. et sp. nov	Valid	Zhang	Early Cretaceous		China	A protapiocerid brachyceran fly. The type species is Pseudapiocera shandongensis.	
Pseudosmittia kodrulae	Sp. nov	Valid	Baranov, Andersen & Perkovsky	Middle Eocene		Russia	An orthoclad, a species of Pseudosmittia.	
Ragas bizarra	Sp. nov	Valid	Hoffeins, Sinclair & Stark	Eocene		Europe (Baltic Sea coast)	A member of the family Empididae.	
Rovnodidactylomyia zhitomirensis	Sp. nov	Valid	Fedotova & Perkovsky	Late Eocene		Ukraine	A gall midge found in Rovno amber, a species of Rovnodidactylomyia.	
Similinannotanyderus	Gen. et sp. nov	Valid	Dong, Shih & Ren	Late Cretaceous (Cenomanian)	Burmese amber	Myanmar	A member of Tanyderidae. The type species is Similinannotanyderus lii.	
Similsciophila undulata	Sp. nov	Valid	Lin, Shih & Ren	Early Cretaceous	Yixian Formation	China	A mesosciophilid nematoceran, a species of Similsciophila.	
Sinosciophila angustia	Sp. nov	Valid	Lin, Shih & Ren	Early Cretaceous	Yixian Formation	China	A mesosciophilid nematoceran, a species of Sinosciophila.	
Sinosciophila seboa	Sp. nov	Valid	Lin, Shih & Ren	Early Cretaceous	Yixian Formation	China	A mesosciophilid nematoceran, a species of Sinosciophila.	
Smittia sukachevae	Sp. nov	Valid	Baranov, Andersen & Perkovsky	Middle Eocene		Russia	An orthoclad, a species of Smittia.	
Stempellinella electra	Sp. nov	Valid	Zakrzewska & Giłka	Eocene		Europe (Baltic Sea coast)	A tanytarsine non-biting midge found in Baltic amber, a species of Stempellinella.	
Stylogaster grimaldii	Sp. nov	Valid	Rocha et al.	Oligocene or Miocene		Dominican Republic	A thick-headed fly found in Dominican amber, a species of Stylogaster.	
Tanytarsus glaesarius	Sp. nov	Valid	Zakrzewska & Giłka	Eocene		Europe (Baltic Sea coast)	A tanytarsine non-biting midge found in Baltic amber, a species of Tanytarsus.	
Tanytarsus protogregarius	Sp. nov	Valid	Zakrzewska & Giłka	Eocene		Europe (Baltic Sea coast)	A tanytarsine non-biting midge found in Baltic amber, a species of Tanytarsus.	
Trentepohlia (Trentepohlia) bajdai	Sp. nov	Valid	Kania	Eocene		Europe (Baltic Sea coast)	A limoniid fly found in Baltic amber, a species of Trentepohlia.	
Trichoneura (Trichoneura) wegiereki	Sp. nov	Valid	Kania	Eocene		Europe (Baltic Sea coast)	A limoniid fly found in Baltic amber, a species of Trichoneura.	
Xenosycorax	Gen. et sp. nov	Valid	Azar & Salamé	Late Cretaceous (Turonian)	New Jersey amber	United States	A sycoracine psychodid fly. The type species is Xenosycorax engeli.	
Xenotrichomyia	Gen. et sp. nov	Valid	Azar, Mouawad & Salamé	Late Cretaceous (Turonian)	New Jersey Amber	United States	A trichomyiine psychodid found in New Jersey amber. The type species is Xenotrichomyia newjerseyiensis.	

=== Dipteran research ===
- Greenwalt, Wingerath and Evenhuis redescribe the holotype wing fossil for "Anthrax" dentoni of the Miocene Latah Formation, Idaho. They conclude the fossil is of overlapping wings and missing key details to place within any genus or subfamily. They deem the species as Bombyliidae incertae sedis.

=== Mecopterans ===
Name	Novelty	Status	Authors	Age	Type locality	Country	Notes	Images
Argentinopanorpa	Gen. et sp. nov	Valid	Lara, Bashkuev & Wang	Late Triassic	Potrerillos Formation	Argentina	An agetopanorpine permochoristid mecopteran. Type species is Argentinopanorpa miguezi.	
Australochorista	Gen. et comb. nov	Valid	Krzemiński et al.	Early Cretaceous		Australia	A mecopteran of uncertain phylogenetic placement; a new genus for "Prochoristella" leongatha Jell & Duncan (1986).	
Bellicimbrophlebia heteroneura	Sp. nov	Valid	Zhang et al.	Middle Jurassic	Jiulongshan Formation	China	A mecopteran belonging to the family Cimbrophlebiidae, a species of Bellicimbrophlebia.	
Cimbrophlebia amoena	Sp. nov	Valid	Zhang et al.	Middle Jurassic	Jiulongshan Formation	China	A mecopteran belonging to the family Cimbrophlebiidae, a species of Cimbrophlebia.	
Cimbrophlebia gracilenta	Sp. nov	Valid	Zhang et al.	Middle Jurassic	Jiulongshan Formation	China; Germany?	A mecopteran belonging to the family Cimbrophlebiidae, a species of Cimbrophlebia.	
Panorpodes gedanensis	Sp. nov	Valid	Soszyńska-Maj & Krzemiński	Eocene (Priabonian)		Europe (Baltic Sea coast)	A panorpodid mecopteran found in Baltic amber, a species of Panorpodes.	
Telobittacus decorus	Sp. nov	Valid	Zhang et al.	Middle Jurassic	Jiulongshan Formation	China	A mecopteran belonging to the family Cimbrophlebiidae, a species of Telobittacus.	

=== Siphonapterans ===
Name	Novelty	Status	Authors	Age	Type locality	Country	Notes	Images
Atopopsyllus	Gen. et sp. nov	Valid	Poinar	Eocene or Miocene		Dominican Republic	A flea belonging to the family Pulicidae found in Dominican amber. The type species is Atopopsyllus cionus.	

== Archaeognathans ==
Name	Novelty	Status	Authorship of new name	Age	Unit	Location	Notes	Images
Neomachilellus (Praeneomachilellus) ezetaelenensis	Sp. nov	Valid	Riquelme et al.	Miocene		Mexico	A rock bristletail found in Chiapas amber, a species of Neomachilellus.	

== Clade Archaeorthoptera ==
=== †Caloneurodea ===
Name	Novelty	Status	Authorship of new name	Age	Unit	Location	Notes	Images
Jarmiloptera	Gen. et sp. nov	Valid	Prokop et al.	Permian (Guadalupian)	Salagou Formation	France	A Caloneurodean Archaeorthopteran. The type species is J. mouralensis.	

=== †Cnemidolestodea ===
Name	Novelty	Status	Authorship of new name	Age	Unit	Location	Notes	Images
Kirovopteron	Gen. et sp. nov	Valid	Aristov	Middle Permian (Kazanian)	Belebeevo Formation	Russia	A Cnemidolestodean belonging to the family Protembiidae. The type species is Kirovopteron luteus.	
Parmaptera	Gen. et sp. nov	Valid	Aristov & Rasnitsyn	Early Permian (Kungurian)	Koshelevka Formation	Russia	A Cnemidolestodean. The type species is Parmaptera permiana.	
Soyanocadaver	Gen. et sp. nov	Valid	Aristov	Middle Permian (Kazanian)	Iva-Gora beds	Russia	A Cnemidolestodean belonging to the family Protembiidae. The type species is Soyanocadaver crypticus.	
Tshekardomina novokshonovi	Sp. nov	Valid	Aristov	Middle Permian (Kazanian)	Iva-Gora beds	Russia	A Cnemidolestodean belonging to the family Protembiidae; A species of Tshekardomina.	

=== Other archaeorthopterans ===
Name	Novelty	Status	Authors	Age	Type locality	Country	Notes	Images
Bethouxia	Gen. et sp. nov	Valid	Prokop et al.	Permian (Guadalupian)	Salagou Formation	France	A member of Archaeorthoptera. The type species is Bethouxia ariegensis.	
Lodevolongzhua	Gen. et sp. nov	Valid	Prokop et al.	Permian (Guadalupian)	Salagou Formation	France	A member of Archaeorthoptera. The type species is Lodevolongzhua incompleta.	
Paralongzhua	Gen. et sp. nov	Valid	Prokop et al.	Permian (Guadalupian)	Salagou Formation	France	A member of Archaeorthoptera. The type species is Paralongzhua elongata.	

=== Orthopterans ===
Name	Novelty	Status	Authorship of new name	Age	Unit	Location	Notes	Images
Aboilus perbellus	Sp. nov	Valid	Wang et al.	Middle–Late Jurassic	Daohugou Beds	China	An aboiline prophalangopsid.	
Panorpidium yixianensis	Sp. nov	Valid	Fang et al.	Early Cretaceous	Yixian Formation	China	An elcanid orthopteran.	
Permophyllum rotundatum	Sp. nov	Valid	Prokop et al.	Permian (Guadalupian)	Salagou Formation	France	Possibly a member of Tettigoniidae, a species of Permophyllum.	
Senexefigia	Gen. et comb. nov	Valid	Chamorro-Rengifo & Lopes-Andrade in Chamorro-Rengifo, Braun & Lopes-Andrade	Oligocene		France	A member of Tettigoniidae; a new genus for "Agraecia" reticulata Piton & Théobald (1939).	

== Clade Coleopterida ==
=== Coleoptera ===
Name	Novelty	Status	Authorship of new name	Age	Unit	Location	Notes	Images
Actenobius magneoculus	Sp. nov	Valid	Peris, Philips & Delclòs	Early Cretaceous (early Albian)		Spain	A member of Anobiinae, a species of Actenobius.	
Allandroides	Gen. et sp. nov	Valid	Legalov	Eocene		Europe (Baltic Sea coast)	A weevil found in Baltic amber. The type species is Allandroides vossi.	
Aneurops daugpilensis	Sp. nov	Valid	Bukejs & Alekseev	Late Eocene		Russia (Kaliningrad Oblast)	A member of Monotomidae found in Baltic amber, a species of Aneurops.	
Anthonomus (Anthomorphus) browni	Sp. nov	Valid	Poinar & Legalov	Cenozoic (Eocene or Miocene)		Dominican Republic	An anthonomine curculionine weevil found in Dominican amber, a species of Anthonomus.	
Anthonomus (Anthomorphus) cruraluma	Sp. nov	Valid	Poinar & Legalov	Cenozoic (Eocene or Miocene)		Dominican Republic	An anthonomine curculionine weevil found in Dominican amber, a species of Anthonomus.	
Archaeocallirhopalus alekseevi	Sp. nov	Valid	Legalov & Bukejs	Eocene		Russia (Kaliningrad Oblast)	A trachyphloeine broad-nosed weevil found in Baltic amber, a species of Archaeocallirhopalus.	
Archealtica	Gen. et sp. nov	Valid	Nadein in Nadein, Perkovsky & Moseyko	Eocene		Ukraine	A leaf beetle belonging to the subfamily Galerucinae found in Rovno amber. The type species is Archealtica convexa.	
Archelamprosomius	Gen. et 2 sp. nov	Valid	Bukejs & Nadein	Late Eocene		Russia (Kaliningrad Oblast)	A lamprosomatine leaf beetle. Genus contains two species known from Baltic amber: Archelamprosomius balticus and Archelamprosomius kirejtshuki.	
Artematopodites lozowskii	Sp. nov	Valid	Ponomarenko	Late Permian		Russia	A permosynid beetle, a species of Artematopodites.	
Attagenus electron	Sp. nov	Valid	Poinar & Háva	Eocene or Miocene		Dominican Republic	A skin beetle belonging to the subfamily Attageninae found in Dominican amber, a species of Attagenus.	
Baissabrenthorhinus	Gen. et sp. nov	Valid	Legalov	Early Cretaceous	Baissa locality	Russia	A weevil. The type species is Baissabrenthorhinus mirabilis.	
Baltocar convexus	Sp. nov	Valid	Legalov	Eocene		Europe (Baltic Sea coast)	A weevil found in Baltic amber, a species of Baltocar.	
Baris grossacavis	Sp. nov	Valid	Poinar Jr. & Legalov	Cenozoic (Eocene or Miocene)		Dominican Republic	A baridine curculionid weevil found in Dominican amber, a species of Baris.	
Bitoma glaesisepulta	Sp. nov	Valid	Alekseev	Eocene		Russia (Kaliningrad Oblast)	A cylindrical bark beetle found in Baltic amber, a species of Bitoma.	
Caccoleptus (Bicaccoleptus) prokopi	Sp. nov	Valid	Poinar & Háva	Eocene or Miocene		Dominican Republic	A skin beetle belonging to the subfamily Megatominae found in Dominican amber, a species of Caccoleptus.	
Caccoleptus (Caccoleptus) electron	Sp. nov	Valid	Poinar & Háva	Eocene or Miocene		Dominican Republic	A skin beetle belonging to the subfamily Megatominae found in Dominican amber, a species of Caccoleptus.	
Calcarocistela	Gen. et sp. nov	Valid	Nabozhenko et al.	Early Cretaceous	Yixian Formation	China	A darkling beetle belonging to the subfamily Alleculinae and the tribe Gonoderini. The type species is Calcarocistela kirejtshuki.	
Calomicroides	Gen. et sp. nov	Valid	Nadein in Nadein, Perkovsky & Moseyko	Eocene		Denmark	A leaf beetle belonging to the subfamily Galerucinae. The type species is Calomicroides danicus.	
Cenocephalus tenuis	Sp. nov	Valid	Peris & Solórzano Kraemer in Peris et al.	Miocene		Mexico	A tesserocerine platypodine ambrosia beetle found in Chiapas amber, a species of Cenocephalus.	
Clidicus cretaceus	Sp. nov	Valid	Kirejtshuk, Kurbatov & Nel	Cretaceous (latest Albian to earliest Cenomanian)		France	A rove beetle belonging to the subfamily Scydmaeninae, a species of Clidicus.	
Cnopus kraxtepellenensis	Sp. nov	Valid	Alekseev & Grzymala	Eocene		Russia (Kaliningrad Oblast)	A member of Aderidae found in Baltic amber, a species of Cnopus.	
Coptodera elektra	Sp. nov	Valid	Gamboa & Ortuño	Eocene		Europe (Baltic Sea coast)	A ground beetle found in Baltic amber, a species of Coptodera.	
Cretakarenni	Gen. et 2 sp. nov	Valid	Peris & Delclòs	Cretaceous (Albian to Cenomianian)	Burmese amber	Myanmar	A monotomid beetle. The type species is C. birmanicus; genus also contains C. hispanicus from the Albian of Spain.	
Cretodeinopsis	Gen. et sp. nov	Valid	Cai & Huang	Late Cretaceous (Cenomanian)	Burmese amber	Myanmar	An aleocharine rove beetle found in Burmese amber. The type species is Cretodeinopsis aenigmatica.	
Cretohypna yixianensis	Sp. nov	Valid	Nikolajev & Ren	Early Cretaceous	Yixian Formation	China	A member of Glaphyridae, a species of Cretohypna.	
Cretonthophilus	Gen. et sp. nov	Valid	Caterino, Wolf-Schwenninger & Bechly	Late Cretaceous (early Cenomanian)	Burmese amber	Myanmar	A member of Histeridae. The type species is Cretonthophilus tuberculatus.	
Cryptocephalus groehni	Sp. nov	Valid	Bukejs & Chamorro	Eocene		Europe (Baltic Sea coast)	A leaf beetle found in Baltic amber, a species of Cryptocephalus.	
Cryptocephalus kheelorum	Sp. nov	Valid	Chamorro & Bukejs in Bukejs & Chamorro	Probably Miocene (Burdigalian)		Dominican Republic	A leaf beetle found in Dominican amber, a species of Cryptocephalus.	
Cryptorhopalum kaliki	Sp. nov	Valid	Poinar & Háva	Eocene or Miocene		Dominican Republic	A skin beetle belonging to the subfamily Megatominae found in Dominican amber, a species of Cryptorhopalum.	
Cryptorhopalum macieji	Sp. nov	Valid	Poinar & Háva	Eocene or Miocene		Dominican Republic	A skin beetle belonging to the subfamily Megatominae found in Dominican amber, a species of Cryptorhopalum.	
Derelomus thalioculus	Sp. nov	Valid	Poinar & Legalov	Cenozoic (Eocene or Miocene)		Dominican Republic	A derelomine curculionine weevil found in Dominican amber, a species of Derelomus.	
Dinoharpalus coptoclavoides	Sp. nov	Valid	Ponomarenko, Prokin & Bashkuev	Late Triassic		Germany	A permosynid beetle, a species of Dinoharpalus.	
Dinoharpalus latus	Sp. nov	Valid	Ponomarenko	Late Permian		Russia	A permosynid beetle, a species of Dinoharpalus.	
Donacia anetae	Sp. nov	Valid	Bieńkowski	Paleocene (Danian)		Russia	A leaf beetle, a species of Donacia.	
Electribius gorskii	Sp. nov	Valid	Háva	Paleogene		Poland	An artematopodid polyphagan found in Baltic amber, a species of Electribius.	
Electribius palaeomexicanus	Sp. nov	Valid	Wu, Coty & Ding	Late Oligocene to middle Miocene		Mexico	An artematopodid polyphagan, a species of Electribius.	
Electrauletes	Gen. et sp. nov	Valid	Legalov	Eocene		Europe (Baltic Sea coast)	A weevil found in Baltic amber. The type species is Electrauletes unicus.	
Elmadulescens	Gen. et sp. nov	Valid	Peris, Maier & Sánchez-García in Peris et al.	Early Cretaceous (early Albian)		Spain	A riffle beetle. The type species is Elmadulescens rugosus.	
Escalerosia igori	Sp. nov	Valid	Alekseev & Grzymala	Eocene		Europe	A member of Aderidae, a species of Escalerosia.	
Furhylobius	Gen. et sp. nov	Valid	Legalov	Eocene	Fur Formation	Denmark	A weevil. The type species is Furhylobius troesteri.	
Glaesotropis alleni	Sp. nov	Valid	Legalov	Eocene		Europe (Baltic Sea coast)	A weevil found in Baltic amber, a species of Glaesotropis.	
Glaesotropis gratshevi	Sp. nov	Valid	Legalov	Eocene		Europe (Baltic Sea coast)	A weevil found in Baltic amber, a species of Glaesotropis.	
Glaesotropis gusakovi	Sp. nov	Valid	Legalov	Eocene		Europe (Baltic Sea coast)	A weevil found in Baltic amber, a species of Glaesotropis.	
Glaesotropis succiniferus	Sp. nov	Valid	Legalov	Eocene		Europe (Baltic Sea coast)	A weevil found in Baltic amber, a species of Glaesotropis.	
Globicornis (Hadrotoma) ingelehmannae	Sp. nov	Valid	Háva & Damgaard	Paleogene		Russia (Kaliningrad Oblast)	A skin beetle belonging to the subfamily Megatominae found in Baltic amber, a species of Globicornis.	
Heterachthes? zappii	Sp. nov	Valid	Vitali	Miocene		Dominican Republic	A longhorn beetle found in Dominican amber, possibly a species of Heterachthes.	
Heterelmis groehni	Sp. nov	Valid	Bukejs, Alekseev & Jäch	Eocene	Baltic amber	Russia (Kaliningrad Oblast)	A riffle beetle, a species of Heterelmis.	
Idgiaites	Gen. et sp. nov	Valid	Liu et al.	Middle Jurassic	Jiulongshan Formation	China	A member of Prionoceridae. The type species is Idgiaites jurassicus.	
Ithyceroides	Gen. et sp. nov	Valid	Legalov	Eocene; Ypresian	Okanagan Highlands; Klondike Mountain Formation	United States; Washington	A weevil. The type species is I. klondikensis.	
Jantarokrama	Gen. et sp. nov	Valid	Kirejtshuk & Kovalev	Late Eocene		Europe (Baltic Sea coast)	A member of Omalisidae found in Baltic amber. The type species is Jantarokrama utilis.	
Jurorhizophagus	Gen. et sp. nov	Valid	Cai, Ślipiński & Huang	Middle Jurassic	Daohugou Beds	China	A member of Monotomidae. The type species is Jurorhizophagus alienus.	
Libanopsis	Gen. et 5 spp. nov	Valid	Kirejtshuk, Chetverikov & Azar	Early Cretaceous		Lebanon	A member of Sphindidae. Genus contains five species: L. poinari, L. impexa, L. limosa, L. straminea and L. slipinskii.	
Limniattagenus	Gen. et sp. nov	Junior synonym	Poinar & Háva	Eocene or Miocene	Dominican amber	Dominican Republic	Originally described as a skin beetle belonging to the subfamily Attageninae; however, Háva & Poinar (2015) reinterpreted it as a junior synonym of the genus Litargus. The type species is Limniattagenus electron (subsequently recombined as Litargus electron).	
Limodromus hoffeinsorum	Sp. nov	Valid	Schmidt	Eocene		Europe (Baltic Sea coast)	A ground beetle found in Baltic amber, a species of Limodromus.	
Litholamprima	Gen. et sp. nov	Valid	Nikolajev & Ren	Early Cretaceous	Yixian Formation	China	A stag beetle. The type species is Litholamprima longimana.	
Melanapion gusakovi	Sp. nov	Valid	Legalov	Eocene		Europe (Baltic Sea coast)	A weevil found in Baltic amber, a species of Melanapion.	
Melanapion poinari	Sp. nov	Valid	Legalov	Eocene		Europe (Baltic Sea coast)	A weevil found in Baltic amber, a species of Melanapion.	
Mesallotrochus	Gen. et sp. nov	Valid	Cai & Huang	Late Cretaceous (Cenomanian)	Burmese amber	Myanmar	An osoriine rove beetle found in Burmese amber. The type species is Mesallotrochus longiantennatus.	
Mesalocerus	Gen. et sp. nov	Valid	Vitali	Early Oligocene		Europe (Baltic Sea coast)	A longhorn beetle belonging to the subfamily Spondylidinae and the tribe Anisarthrini found in Baltic amber. The type species is Mesalocerus tetropoides.	
Mesolpinus	Gen. et 5 sp. nov	Valid	Kirejtshuk, Moseyko & Ren	Early Cretaceous	Yixian Formation	China	A leaf beetle belonging to the subfamily Chrysomelinae. The type species is M. antenattus; genus also includes M. adapertilis, M. angusticollis, M. basicollis and M. trapezicollis.	
Mesoschizopus	Gen. et sp. nov	Valid	Cai, Ślipiński & Huang	Early Cretaceous	Yixian Formation	China	A member of Schizopodidae. The type species is Mesoschizopus elegans.	
Microbregma waldwico	Sp. nov	Valid	Bukejs & Alekseev	Late Eocene		Russia (Kaliningrad Oblast)	A species of Microbregma known from Baltic amber.	
Microscapha andrzeji	Sp. nov	Valid	Bukejs & Alekseev	Eocene		Europe (Baltic Sea coast)	A false darkling beetle found in Baltic amber, a species of Microscapha.	
Microticus	Gen. et sp. nov	Valid	Lyubarsky & Perkovsky	Late Cretaceous (Santonian)	Kheta Formation	Russia	A silken fungus beetle found in Taymyr amber. The type species is Microticus khatanga.	
Mongoligenula	Gen. et 2 spp. nov	Valid	Yu et al.	Early Cretaceous	Yixian Formation	China	A member of Buprestidae. The type species is Mongoligenula altilabdominis; genus also contains Mongoligenula gracilis.	
Neosibinia	Gen. et sp. nov	Valid	Poinar & Legalov	Cenozoic (Eocene or Miocene)		Dominican Republic	A tychiine curculionine weevil found in Dominican amber. The type species is Neosibinia lepidosoma.	
Obrium damgaardi	Sp. nov	Valid	Vitali	Eocene		Europe (Baltic Sea coast)	A longhorn beetle found in Baltic amber, a species of Obrium.	
Oodes kachinensis	Sp. nov	Valid	Liu	Cretaceous	Burmese amber	Myanmar	A ground beetle found in Burmese amber, a species of Oodes.	
Orchesia (Orchestera) canaliculata	Sp. nov	Valid	Alekseev & Bukejs	Eocene		Russia (Kaliningrad Oblast)	A false darkling beetle found in Baltic amber, a species of Orchesia.	
Palaeocnopus	Gen. et 4 sp. nov	Valid	Alekseev & Grzymala	Eocene		Europe	A member of Aderidae. Genus contains four species: P. densipunctatus, P. saeticornis, P. glabricornis and P. mara.	
Palaeonanophyes	Gen. et sp. nov	Valid	Legalov	Eocene	Green River Formation	United States; Colorado	A member of Brentidae belonging to the subfamily Nanophyinae. The type species is P. zherikhini.	
Palaeotanaos	Gen. et sp. nov	Valid	Kirejtshuk, Legalov & Nel	Early Eocene		France	A member of Brentidae belonging to the subfamily Apioninae and the tribe Tanaini found in Oise amber. The type species is Palaeotanaos oisensis.	
Paleomolpus	Gen. et sp. nov	Valid	Nadein in Nadein, Perkovsky & Moseyko	Eocene		Denmark	A leaf beetle belonging to the subfamily Eumolpinae. The type species is Paleomolpus hirtus.	
Paracretocateres	Gen. et sp. nov	Valid	Yu et al.	Early Cretaceous	Yixian Formation	China	A lophocaterine trogossitid beetle. The type species is Paracretocateres bellus. Kirejtshuk (2017) considered the genus Paracretocateres to be a junior synonym of the genus Forticatinius Tan & Ren (2007).	
Paraglaphyrus	Gen. et 4 sp. nov	Valid	Nikolajev	Early Cretaceous	Yixian Formation	China	A member of Glaphyridae. The type species is Paraglaphyrus yixianensis; genus also contains Paraglaphyrus ovalis, Paraglaphyrus robustus and Paraglaphyrus subtilis.	
Picemelinus irinae	Sp. nov	Valid	Alekseev & Grzymala	Eocene		Europe	A member of Aderidae, a species of Picemelinus.	
Proterocupes	Gen. et comb. et 2 sp. nov	Valid	Ponomarenko	Late Permian		Russia	A relative of reticulated beetles. A new genus for "Simmondsia" permiana Ponomarenko (2004); genus also contains new species Proterocupes nedubrovensis and Proterocupes major.	
Protolisthaerus	Gen. et sp. nov	Valid	Cai, Beattie & Huang	Middle Jurassic	Daohugou Beds	China	An olisthaerine rove beetle. The type species is Protolisthaerus jurassicus.	
Protoluciola	Gen. et sp. nov	Valid	Kazantsev	Cretaceous (approximately 100 million years ago)	Burmese amber	Myanmar	A firefly. The type species is Protoluciola albertalleni.	
Pseudobothrideres criwecriwayto	Sp. nov	Valid	Alekseev	Eocene		Europe (Baltic Sea coast)	A member of Bothrideridae found in Baltic amber, a species of Pseudobothrideres.	
Pseudobothrideres rugiorum	Sp. nov	Valid	Alekseev	Eocene		Germany	A member of Bothrideridae found in Baltic amber, a species of Pseudobothrideres.	
Pseudochrysomelites circumflexus	Sp. nov	Valid	Ponomarenko	Late Permian		Russia	A schizocoleid beetle, a species of Pseudochrysomelites.	
Pseudochrysomelites convexus	Sp. nov	Valid	Ponomarenko	Late Permian		Russia	A schizocoleid beetle, a species of Pseudochrysomelites.	
Pseudochrysomelites latissimus	Sp. nov	Valid	Ponomarenko	Late Permian		Russia	A schizocoleid beetle, a species of Pseudochrysomelites.	
Pseudopilolabus othnius	Sp. nov	Valid	Poinar, Brown & Legalov	Eocene or Miocene		Dominican Republic	A weevil belonging to the family Attelabidae found in Dominican amber, a species of Pseudopilolabus.	
Psyllototus Viking	Sp. nov	Valid	Nadein in Nadein, Perkovsky & Moseyko	Eocene		Denmark	A leaf beetle belonging to the subfamily Galerucinae, a species of Psyllototus.	
Pycnomerus simukovi	Sp. nov	Valid	Alekseev	Eocene		Russia (Kaliningrad Oblast)	An ironclad beetle found in Baltic amber, a species of Pycnomerus.	
Quasianisoxya	Gen. et sp. nov	Valid	Alekseev	Eocene		Russia (Kaliningrad Oblast)	A beetle found in Baltic amber; originally described as a false darkling beetle belonging to the tribe Dircaeini, but subsequently transferred to the family Scraptiidae and the tribe Scraptiini. The type species is Quasianisoxya curonensis.	
Rhizophtoma longus	Sp. nov	Valid	Peris & Delclòs	Early Cretaceous (Albian)		Spain	A monotomid beetle, a species of Rhizophtoma.	
Rhopalomma	Gen. et sp. nov	Valid	Ashman, Oberprieler & Ślipiński	Late Jurassic	Talbragar Fish Bed	Australia	A member of Ommatidae. The type species is Rhopalomma stefaniae.	Rhopalomma stefaniae
Rhynchitobius tanyrhinus	Sp. nov	Valid	Poinar & Legalov	Cenozoic		Dominican Republic	A tooth-nosed snout weevil found in Dominican amber, a species of Rhynchitobius.	
Rhynchitobius xuthocolus	Sp. nov	Valid	Poinar & Legalov	Cenozoic		Dominican Republic	A tooth-nosed snout weevil found in Dominican amber, a species of Rhynchitobius.	
Saperda caroli	Sp. nov	Valid	Vitali	Eocene	Green River Formation	United States; Colorado	A Saperdini tribe lamiine long-horn beetle.	
Serecoleus	Gen. et sp. nov	Valid	Yan et al.	Middle Jurassic	Daohugou Beds	China	A member of Byrrhoidea. The type species is Serecoleus nadbitovae.	
Sinobrevipogon	Gen. et sp. nov	Valid	Cai et al.	Middle Jurassic	Daohugou Beds	China	A member of Artematopodidae. The type species is Sinobrevipogon jurassicus.	
Sinopraecipuus	Gen. et sp. nov	Valid	Yu et al.	Early Cretaceous	Yixian Formation	China	A longhorn beetle. The type species is Sinopraecipuus bilobatus.	
Smicrips gorskii	Sp. nov	Valid	Bukejs & Kirejtshuk	Eocene		Europe (Baltic Sea coast)	A member of Smicripidae found in Baltic amber, a species of Smicrips.	
Stargelytron	Gen. et 2 sp. nov	Valid	Ponomarenko, Prokin & Bashkuev	Middle to Late Triassic		Germany	A member of Coptoclavidae. Genus includes Stargelytron larissae and Stargelytron altus.	
Stegobium raritanensis	Sp. nov	Valid	Peris, Philips & Delclòs	Late Cretaceous (Turonian)	New Jersey Amber	United States	A member of Anobiinae, a relative of the drugstore beetle.	
Stephanopachys ambericus	Sp. nov	Valid	Zahradník & Háva	Eocene		Russia (Kaliningrad Oblast)	A member of Bostrichidae found in Baltic amber, a species of Stephanopachys.	
Stephanopachys electron	Sp. nov	Valid	Zahradník & Háva	Eocene		Russia (Kaliningrad Oblast)	A member of Bostrichidae found in Baltic amber, a species of Stephanopachys.	
Succinispa	Gen. et sp. nov	Valid	Nadein in Nadein, Perkovsky & Moseyko	Eocene		Europe (Baltic Sea coast)	A leaf beetle belonging to the subfamily Cassidinae found in Baltic amber. The type species is Succinispa stainesi.	
Succinoomorphus	Gen. et sp. nov	Valid	Bukejs & Nadein	Eocene		Russia (Kaliningrad Oblast)	A lamprosomatine leaf beetle found in Baltic amber. The type species is Succinoomorphus warchalowskii.	
Sucinolivolia	Gen. et sp. nov	Valid	Bukejs, Biondi & Alekseev	Late Eocene		Russia (Kaliningrad Oblast)	A flea beetle found in Baltic amber. The type species is Sucinolivolia torpida.	
Taphioporus carsteni	Sp. nov	Valid	Bukejs & Moseyko	Eocene		Europe (Baltic Sea coast)	A leaf beetle belonging to the subfamily Eumolpinae found in Baltic amber, a species of Taphioporus.	
Taphioporus rovnoi	Sp. nov	Valid	Moseyko & Perkovsky in Nadein, Perkovsky & Moseyko	Eocene		Ukraine	A leaf beetle belonging to the subfamily Eumolpinae found in Rovno amber, a species of Taphioporus.	
Taphioporus rufous	Sp. nov	Valid	Bukejs & Moseyko	Eocene		Europe (Baltic Sea coast)	A leaf beetle belonging to the subfamily Eumolpinae found in Baltic amber, a species of Taphioporus.	
Tesserocerus simojovelensis	Sp. nov	Valid	Peris & Solórzano Kraemer in Peris et al.	Miocene		Mexico	A tesserocerine platypodine ambrosia beetle found in Chiapas amber, a species of Tesserocerus.	
Tetracoleus golubevi	Sp. nov	Valid	Ponomarenko	Late Permian		Russia	An asiocoleid beetle, a species of Tetracoleus.	
Trechus balticus	Sp. nov	Valid	Schmidt & Faille	Eocene		Europe (Baltic Sea coast)	A species of Trechus found in Baltic amber.	
Uskatocoleus artus	Sp. nov	Valid	Ponomarenko	Late Permian		Russia	A schizocoleid beetle, a species of Uskatocoleus.	
Uskatocoleus hirsutus	Sp. nov	Valid	Ponomarenko	Late Permian		Russia	A schizocoleid beetle, a species of Uskatocoleus.	
Uskatocoleus minor	Sp. nov	Valid	Ponomarenko	Late Permian		Russia	A schizocoleid beetle, a species of Uskatocoleus.	
Vabole	Gen. et sp. nov	Valid	Alekseev & Nabozhenko	Eocene		Europe (Baltic Sea coast)	A darkling beetle belonging to the tribe Palorini found in Baltic amber. The type species is Vabole triplehorni.	
Vanonus aestiorum	Sp. nov	Valid	Alekseev & Grzymala	Eocene		Europe	A member of Aderidae, a species of Vanonus.	
Vanonus ulmerigicus	Sp. nov	Valid	Alekseev & Grzymala	Eocene		Europe	A member of Aderidae, a species of Vanonus.	
Yixianochodaeus	Gen. et sp. nov	Valid	Nikolajev	Early Cretaceous	Yixian Formation	China	A member of Ochodaeidae belonging to the subfamily Chaetocanthinae and the tribe Synochodaeini. The type species is Yixianochodaeus horridus.	
Yixianscarabaeus	Gen. et 2 sp. nov	Valid	Nikolajev	Early Cretaceous	Yixian Formation	China	A member of Scarabaeoidea belonging to the family Eremazidae. The type species is Yixianscarabaeus sulcatus; genus also includes Yixianscarabaeus tenuistriatus.	
Yixianteres	Gen. et sp. nov	Valid	Yu et al.	Early Cretaceous	Yixian Formation	China	A lophocaterine trogossitid beetle. The type species is Yixianteres beipiaoensis.	
Zygadenia floodpagei	Sp. nov	Valid	Jarzembowski et al.	Early Cretaceous (Hauterivian to Barremian)	Weald Clay Group	United Kingdom	An ommatine beetle, a species of Zygadenia.	
Zygadenia liui	Sp. nov	Valid	Jarzembowski et al.	Early Cretaceous (Aptian)	Sinuiju Formation; Yixian Formation	China; North Korea	An ommatine beetle, a species of Zygadenia.	
Zygadenia martinae	Sp. nov	Valid	Jarzembowski et al.	Early Jurassic (Sinemurian to Toarcian)	Cattamarra Coal Measures	Australia	An ommatine beetle, a species of Zygadenia.	
Zygadenia simpsoni	Sp. nov	Valid	Jarzembowski et al.	Early Cretaceous (Hauterivian to Barremian)	Weald Clay Group	United Kingdom	An ommatine beetle, a species of Zygadenia.	

== Clade Dictyoptera ==
=== Blattodea ===
Name	Novelty	Status	Authorship of new name	Age	Unit	Location	Notes	Images
Latiblattella avita	Sp. nov	Valid	Greenwalt & Vidlička	Eocene (Lutetian)	Kishenehn Formation	United States	A cockroach related to members of the genus Ectobius, a species of Latiblattella.	
Manipulator	Gen. et sp. nov	Valid	Vršanský & Bechly	Late Cretaceous (Cenomanian)	Burmese amber	Myanmar	A corydioid cockroach and/or a possible relative of the mantises. The type species is Manipulator modificaputis.	Manipulator modificaputis
Phyloblatta? vrsanskyi	Sp. nov	Valid	Aristov	Early Permian		Russia	A cockroach, possibly a species of Phyloblatta.	
Raptoblatta	Gen. et sp. nov	Valid	Dittmann et al.	Early Cretaceous (Aptian)	Crato Formation	Brazil	A Mesoblattinidae Dictyoptera. The type species is Raptoblatta waddingtonae.	

=== "Isoptera" ===
Name	Novelty	Status	Authorship of new name	Age	Unit	Location	Notes	Images
Gyatermes naganoensis	Sp. nov	Valid	Engel & Tanaka	Late Miocene (late Messinian)	Ogawa Formation	Japan	An archotermopsid termite, a species of Gyatermes.	
Huguenotermes	Gen. et sp. nov	Valid	Engel & Nel	Eocene (early Priabonian)		France	A kalotermitid termite. The type species is Huguenotermes septimaniensis.	

== Clade Hymenopterida ==
=== Hymenopterans ===
Name	Novelty	Status	Authorship of new name	Age	Unit	Location	Notes	Images
Acephialtitia	Gen. et sp. nov	Valid	Li et al.	Early Cretaceous	Yixian Formation	China	An ephialtitid wasp. The type species is Acephialtitia colossa.	
Agastomyrma	Gen. et sp. nov	Valid	Dlussky, Rasnitsyn & Perfilieva	Late Eocene	Bol'shaya Svetlovodnaya site	Russia	A myrmicine ant. The type species is A. laticeps.	
Amplicella exquisitissima	Sp. nov	Valid	Kopylov & Zhang	Early Cretaceous	Yixian Formation	China	An ichneumonid, a species of Amplicella.	
Amplicella flagellata	Sp. nov	Valid	Kopylov & Zhang	Early Cretaceous	Yixian Formation	China	An ichneumonid, a species of Amplicella.	
Amplicella townesi	Sp. nov	Valid	Kopylov & Zhang	Early Cretaceous	Yixian Formation	China	An ichneumonid, a species of Amplicella.	
Archaeogryon	Gen. et sp. nov	Valid	Kononova & Simutnik in Kononova, Simutnik & Lazarenko	Eocene	Rovno amber	Ukraine	A Scelionidae wasp. The type species is A. floridus.	
Archaeoserphites	Gen. et sp. nov	Valid	Engel	Early Cretaceous (Barremian)	Lebanese amber	Lebanon	A wasp related to the family Serphitidae. The type species is A. melqarti.	
Archigonatocerus	Gen. et 2 sp. nov	Valid	Huber	Eocene	Baltic amber	Russia (Kaliningrad Oblast)	A fairyfly with two species: A. balticus and A. longivena.	
Austroponera schneideri	Sp nov	Valid	Kaulfuss & Dlussky	Aquitanian	Foulden Maar	New Zealand	A ponerine ant	Austroponera schneideri
Baikuris maximus	Sp. nov	Valid	Perrichot	Albian-Cenomanian	Charentese amber	France	A sphecomyrmine ant	Baikuris maximus
Biamomyrma	Gen. et 3 sp. nov	Valid	Dlussky, Rasnitsyn & Perfilieva	Late Eocene	Bol'shaya Svetlovodnaya site	Russia	An ant belonging to the subfamily Myrmicinae. The type species is B. zherikhini; genus also contains B. lata and B. rugosa.	
Brachyscelio grandiculus	Sp. nov	Valid	Kononova & Simutnik in Kononova, Simutnik & Lazarenko	Eocene		Ukraine	A member of Scelionidae found in Rovno amber, a species of Brachyscelio.	
Brevisiricius	Gen. et sp. nov	Valid	Wang et al.	Middle Jurassic	Jiulongshan Formation	China	A praesiricid sawfly. The type species is Brevisiricius distortus.	
Casaleia orientalis	Sp. nov	Valid	Dlussky, Rasnitsyn & Perfilieva	Late Eocene	Bol'shaya Svetlovodnaya site	Russia	An ant belonging to the subfamily Amblyoponinae.	
Centrodora brevispinae	Sp. nov	Valid	Burks & Heraty in Burks et al.	Eocene (Lutetian)		Europe (Baltic Sea coast)	An aphelinid chalcid wasp found in Baltic amber, a species of Centrodora.	
Clystopsenella mirabilis	Sp. nov	Valid	Engel	Early Miocene		Dominican Republic	A scolebythid wasp found in Dominican amber, a species of Clystopsenella.	
Colemanus	Gen. et sp. et comb. nov	Valid	Fisher in Fisher, Tucker & Sharkey	Eocene	Green River Formation	United States	A Proteropini tribe ichneutine braconid wasp. The type species is C. keeleyorum Also includes Ichneutes contortus (1933) from Baltic amber.	
Crematogaster aurora	Sp. nov	Valid	Lapolla & Greenwalt	Eocene	Kishenehn Formation	United States	A myrmicine ant. Originally described as a species of Crematogaster, subsequently transferred to the genus Incertogaster.	Crematogaster aurora
Cuspilongus	Gen. et sp. nov	Valid	Archibald & Rasnitsyn	Eocene (Ypresian)		Canada	A stem sawfly. The type species is Cuspilongus cachecreekensis.	
Decorisiricius	Gen. et 2 sp. nov	Valid	Wang et al.	Early Cretaceous	Yixian Formation	China	A praesiricid sawfly. The type species is Decorisiricius patulus; genus also contains Decorisiricius longus.	
Diaspathion	Gen. et sp. nov	Valid	Engel & Huang in Engel et al.	Cenomanian	Burmese amber	Myanmar	A spathiopterygid wasp. The type species is Diaspathion ortegai.	
Dolichoderus dlusskyi	Sp. nov	Valid	Lapolla & Greenwalt	Eocene	Kishenehn Formation	United States	A dolichoderine ant.	Dolichoderus dlusskyi
Dolichoderus pinguis	Sp. nov	Valid	Dlussky, Rasnitsyn & Perfilieva	Late Eocene	Bol'shaya Svetlovodnaya site	Russia	An ant belonging to the subfamily Dolichoderinae.	
Emplastus biamoensis	Sp. nov	Valid	Perfilieva & Rasnitsyn	Late Eocene	Bol'shaya Svetlovodnaya site	Russia	An ant belonging to the subfamily Dolichoderinae.	
Emplastus elongatus	Sp. nov	Valid	Dlussky, Rasnitsyn & Perfilieva	Late Eocene	Bol'shaya Svetlovodnaya site	Russia	An ant belonging to the subfamily Dolichoderinae.	
Emplastus macrops	Sp. nov	Valid	Dlussky, Rasnitsyn & Perfilieva	Late Eocene	Bol'shaya Svetlovodnaya site	Russia	An ant belonging to the subfamily Dolichoderinae.	
Eochrysis	Nom. nov	Valid	Doweld	Eocene (Lutetian)		Russia (Kaliningrad Oblast)	A cuckoo wasp found in Baltic amber; a replacement name for Protochrysis Bischoff (1916) and its first replacement name Protochrysidis Carpenter (1985) (both preoccupied).	
Eoformica brevipetiola	Sp. nov	Valid	Lapolla & Greenwalt	Eocene	Kishenehn Formation	United States	An ant of uncertain phylogenetic placement.	Eoformica brevipetiola
Eoformica latimedia	Sp. nov	Valid	Lapolla & Greenwalt	Eocene	Kishenehn Formation	United States	An ant of uncertain phylogenetic placement'.	Eoformica latimedia
Ferganolyda eucalla	Sp. nov	Valid	Wang et al.	Middle Jurassic	Jiulongshan Formation	China	A xyelydid sawfly, a species of Ferganolyda.	
Ferganolyda insolita	Sp. nov	Valid	Wang et al.	Middle Jurassic	Jiulongshan Formation	China	A xyelydid sawfly, a species of Ferganolyda.	
Fissilyda	Gen. et 3 sp. nov	Valid	Wang et al.	Early Cretaceous	Yixian Formation	China	A xyelydid sawfly. Genus contains three species: Fissilyda compta, F. alba and F. parilis.	
Fonsecadalia	Gen. et 2 sp. nov	Valid	Mendes, de Oliveira & Limaverde	Eocene–Oligocene	Fonseca Formation	Brazil	A member of Pergidae belonging to the subfamily Euryinae. The type species is F. perfectus; genus also includes F. propinquus.	
Formica annosa	Sp. nov	Valid	Lapolla & Greenwalt	Eocene	Kishenehn Formation	United States	A formicine ant.	Formica annosa
Formica biamoensis	Sp. nov	Valid	Dlussky, Rasnitsyn & Perfilieva	Late Eocene	Bol'shaya Svetlovodnaya site	Russia	An ant belonging to the subfamily Formicinae.	
Formica paleosibirica	Sp. nov	Valid	Dlussky, Rasnitsyn & Perfilieva	Late Eocene	Bol'shaya Svetlovodnaya site	Russia	An ant belonging to the subfamily Formicinae.	
Gesomyrmex incertus	Sp. nov	Valid	Dlussky, Rasnitsyn & Perfilieva	Late Eocene	Bol'shaya Svetlovodnaya site	Russia	An ant belonging to the subfamily Formicinae.	
Gesomyrmex macrops	Sp. nov	Valid	Dlussky, Rasnitsyn & Perfilieva	Late Eocene	Bol'shaya Svetlovodnaya site	Russia	An ant belonging to the subfamily Formicinae.	
Gesomyrmex magnus	Sp. nov	Valid	Dlussky, Rasnitsyn & Perfilieva	Late Eocene	Bol'shaya Svetlovodnaya site	Russia	An ant belonging to the subfamily Formicinae.	
Glaesaphytis	Gen. et sp. nov	Valid	Burks & Heraty in Burks et al.	Eocene (Lutetian)		Europe (Baltic Sea coast)	An aphelinid chalcid wasp found in Baltic amber. The type species is Glaesaphytis interregni.	
Gonatocerus janzeni	Sp. nov	Valid	Huber	Eocene		Russia (Kaliningrad Oblast)	A fairyfly found in Baltic amber, a species of Gonatocerus.	
Habraulacus	Gen. et sp. nov	Valid	Li et al.	Cenomanian	Burmese amber	Myanmar	A praeaulacid evanioid wasp. The type species is Habraulacus zhaoi.	
Khasurtella zhangi	Sp. nov	Valid	Kopylov & Zhang	Early Cretaceous	Yixian Formation	China	An ichneumonid, a species of Khasurtella.	
Kotenkia	Gen. et sp. nov	Valid	Simutnik	Eocene		Russia	A member of Encyrtidae. The type species is Kotenkia platycera.	
Ktunaxia	Gen. et sp. nov	Valid	Lapolla & Greenwalt	Eocene	Kishenehn Formation	United States	A dolichoderine ant. The type species is Ktunaxia jucunda.	
Lasius glom	Sp. nov	Valid	Lapolla & Greenwalt	Eocene	Kishenehn Formation	United States	A formicine ant, a species of Lasius.	
Limbisiricius	Gen. et 2 sp. nov	Valid	Wang et al.	Middle Jurassic	Jiulongshan Formation	China	A praesiricid sawfly. The type species is Decorisiricius aequalis; genus also contains Limbisiricius complanatus.	
Liometopum incognitum	Sp. nov	Valid	Dlussky, Rasnitsyn & Perfilieva	Late Eocene	Bol'shaya Svetlovodnaya site	Russia	An ant belonging to the subfamily Dolichoderinae, a species of Liometopum.	
Mirufens illusionis	Sp. nov	Valid	Burks, Pinto & Heraty in Burks et al.	Eocene (Lutetian)		Europe (Baltic Sea coast)	A trichogrammatid chalcid wasp found in Baltic amber, a species of Mirufens.	
Myrmecites dubius	Sp. nov	Valid	Dlussky, Rasnitsyn & Perfilieva	Late Eocene	Bol'shaya Svetlovodnaya site	Russia	An ant belonging to the subfamily Myrmicinae, a species of Myrmecites.	
Myrmecites major	Sp. nov	Valid	Dlussky, Rasnitsyn & Perfilieva	Late Eocene	Bol'shaya Svetlovodnaya site	Russia	An ant belonging to the subfamily Myrmicinae, a species of Myrmecites.	
Myrmecites sibiricus	Sp. nov	Valid	Dlussky, Rasnitsyn & Perfilieva	Late Eocene	Bol'shaya Svetlovodnaya site	Russia	An ant belonging to the subfamily Myrmicinae, a species of Myrmecites.	
Novalyda decora	Sp. nov	Valid	Wang et al.	Early Cretaceous	Yixian Formation	China	A xyelydid sawfly, a species of Novalyda.	
Pachycondyla aberrans	Sp. nov	Valid	Dlussky, Rasnitsyn & Perfilieva	Late Eocene	Bol'shaya Svetlovodnaya site	Russia	An ant belonging to the subfamily Ponerinae, a species of Pachycondyla.	
Pachycondyla oligocenica	Sp. nov	Valid	Dlussky, Rasnitsyn & Perfilieva	Late Eocene	Bol'shaya Svetlovodnaya site	Russia	An ant belonging to the subfamily Ponerinae, a species of Pachycondyla.	
Pachycondyla parvula	Nom. nov	Valid	Dlussky, Rasnitsyn & Perfilieva	Middle Eocene	Messel pit	Germany	An ant belonging to the subfamily Ponerinae, a species of Pachycondyla. A replacement name for Pachycondyla minuta Dlussky & Wedmann (2012) (preoccupied).	Pachycondyla parvula
Palaeogramma	Gen. et sp. nov	Valid	Burks, Pinto & Heraty in Burks et al.	Eocene (Lutetian)		Europe (Baltic Sea coast)	A trichogrammatid chalcid wasp found in Baltic amber. The type species is Palaeogramma eos.	
Paraneuretus dubovikoffi	Sp. nov	Valid	Dlussky, Rasnitsyn & Perfilieva	Late Eocene	Bol'shaya Svetlovodnaya site	Russia	An ant belonging to the subfamily Aneuretinae, a species of Paraneuretus.	
Paridris yumai	Sp. nov	Valid	Talamas in Talamas & Buffington	Miocene		Dominican Republic	A member of Scelioninae found in Dominican amber, a species of Paridris.	
Paxylommites groehni	Sp. nov	Valid	Tolkanits & Perkovsky	Eocene		Europe (Baltic Sea coast)	An ichneumonid found in Baltic amber, a species of Paxylommites.	
Phtuaria	Gen. et sp. nov	Valid	Burks & Heraty in Burks et al.	Eocene (Lutetian)		Europe (Baltic Sea coast)	An aphelinid chalcid wasp found in Baltic amber. The type species is Phtuaria fimbriae.	
Plaumannion fistulosum	Sp. nov	Valid	Talamas in Talamas & Buffington	Miocene		Dominican Republic	A member of Scelioninae found in Dominican amber, a species of Plaumannion.	
Ponerites kishenehne	Sp. nov	Valid	Lapolla & Greenwalt	Eocene	Kishenehn Formation	United States	A ponerine ant, a species of Ponerites.	
Praeaulacus byssinus	Sp. nov	Valid	Wang, Li & Shih	Middle Jurassic	Jiulongshan Formation	China	A praeaulacid wasp, a species of Praeaulacus.	
Proceratium petrosum	Sp. nov	Valid	Dlussky, Rasnitsyn & Perfilieva	Late Eocene	Bol'shaya Svetlovodnaya site	Russia	An ant belonging to the subfamily Proceratiinae, a species of Proceratium.	
Proephialtitia	Gen. et 2 sp. nov	Valid	Li et al.	Middle Jurassic	Jiulongshan Formation	China	An ephialtitid wasp. Genus contains two species: Proephialtitia acantha and Proephialtitia tenuata.	
Proiridomyrmex rotundatus	Sp. nov	Valid	Lapolla & Greenwalt	Eocene	Kishenehn Formation	United States	A dolichoderine ant, a species of Proiridomyrmex.	
Protazteca eocenica	Sp. nov	Valid	Lapolla & Greenwalt	Eocene	Kishenehn Formation	United States	A dolichoderine ant, a species of Protazteca.	
Pseudomyrmex saxulum	Sp. nov	Valid	Lapolla & Greenwalt	Eocene	Kishenehn Formation	United States	A pseudomyrmecine ant, a species of Pseudomyrmex.	
Pterandrophysalis plasmans	Sp. nov	Valid	Burks, Pinto & Heraty in Burks et al.	Eocene (Lutetian)		Europe (Baltic Sea coast)	A trichogrammatid chalcid wasp found in Baltic amber, a species of Pterandrophysalis.	
Pteropilosa	Gen. et sp. nov	Valid	Bläser, Krogmann & Peters	Eocene		Europe (Baltic Sea coast)	A member of Pteromalidae belonging to the subfamily Cerocephalinae found in Baltic amber. The type species is Pteropilosa lailarabanorum.	
Rovnosoma	Gen. et sp. nov	Valid	Simutnik & Perkovsky	Late Eocene		Ukraine	An encyrtid wasp found in Rovno amber. The type species is Rovnosoma gracile.	
Rudisiricius ater	Sp. nov	Valid	Wang et al.	Early Cretaceous	Yixian Formation	China	A praesiricid sawfly, a species of Rudisiricius.	
Rudisiricius ferox	Sp. nov	Valid	Wang et al.	Early Cretaceous	Yixian Formation	China	A praesiricid sawfly, a species of Rudisiricius.	
Rudisiricius membranaceous	Sp. nov	Valid	Wang et al.	Early Cretaceous	Yixian Formation	China	A praesiricid sawfly, a species of Rudisiricius.	
Rudisiricius parvus	Sp. nov	Valid	Wang et al.	Early Cretaceous	Yixian Formation	China	A praesiricid sawfly, a species of Rudisiricius.	
Rudisiricius tenellus	Sp. nov	Valid	Wang et al.	Early Cretaceous	Yixian Formation	China	A praesiricid sawfly, a species of Rudisiricius.	
Rudisiricius validus	Sp. nov	Valid	Wang et al.	Early Cretaceous	Yixian Formation	China	A praesiricid sawfly, a species of Rudisiricius.	
Sinochora	Gen. et sp. nov	Valid	Kopylov & Zhang	Early Cretaceous	Yixian Formation	China	An ichneumonid. The type species is Sinochora distorta.	
Sinoproscolia	Gen. et sp. nov	Valid	Zhang et al.	Early Cretaceous	Yixian Formation	China	A scoliid wasp. The type species is Sinoproscolia yangshuwanziensis.	
Solenopsites abdita	Sp. nov	Valid	Lapolla & Greenwalt	Eocene	Kishenehn Formation	United States	A myrmicine ant, a species of Solenopsites.	Solenopsites abdita
Sugonjaevia	Gen. et sp. nov	Valid	Simutnik	Eocene		Russia	A member of Encyrtidae. The type species is Sugonjaevia sakhalinica.	
Sulia	Gen. et sp. nov	Valid	Simutnik	Late Eocene		Denmark	A member of Encyrtidae. The type species is Sulia glaesaria.	
Symphytopterus graciler	Sp. nov	Valid	Wang, Li & Shih	Middle Jurassic	Jiulongshan Formation	China	An ephialtitid wasp, a species of Symphytopterus.	
Szelenyia terebrae	Sp. nov	Valid	Burks, Pinto & Heraty in Burks et al.	Eocene (Lutetian)		Europe (Baltic Sea coast)	A trichogrammatid chalcid wasp found in Baltic amber, a species of Szelenyia.	
Tanychora liaoningensis	Sp. nov	Valid	Kopylov & Zhang	Early Cretaceous	Yixian Formation	China	An ichneumonid, a species of Tanychora.	
Tanychora rasnitsyni	Sp. nov	Valid	Kopylov & Zhang	Early Cretaceous	Yixian Formation	China	An ichneumonid, a species of Tanychora.	
Tenuicornus	Gen. et sp. nov	Valid	Bläser, Krogmann & Peters	Early Miocene		Dominican Republic	A member of Pteromalidae belonging to the subfamily Cerocephalinae found in Dominican amber. The type species is Tenuicornus dominicus.	
Tetramorium kulickae	Sp. nov	Valid	Radchenko & Dlussky	Late Eocene		Poland	An ant found in Baltic amber, a species of Tetramorium.	
Tetramorium paraarmatum	Sp. nov	Valid	Radchenko & Dlussky	Late Eocene		Poland	An ant found in Baltic amber, a species of Tetramorium.	
Ulteramus	Gen. et sp. nov	Valid	Archibald & Rasnitsyn	Eocene (Ypresian)	Klondike Mountain Formation	United States	A pamphiliid sawfly. The type species is Ulteramus republicensis.	
Ypresiomyrma orientalis	Sp. nov	Valid	Dlussky, Rasnitsyn & Perfilieva	Late Eocene	Bol'shaya Svetlovodnaya site	Russia	An ant belonging to the subfamily Myrmeciinae, a species of Ypresiomyrma.	
Ypresiosirex	Gen. et sp. nov	Valid	Archibald & Rasnitsyn	Eocene (Ypresian)		Canada	A horntail. The type species is Ypresiosirex orthosemos.	

== Clade Neuropterida ==
=== Neuroptera ===
Name	Novelty	Status	Authorship of new name	Age	Unit	Location	Notes	Images
Aetheogramma bistriatum	Sp. nov	Valid	Yang et al.	Early Cretaceous	Yixian Formation	China	An aetheogrammatid neuropteran.	
Archaeochrysa sanikwa	Sp. nov	Valid	Archibald & Makarkin	Ypresian	Driftwood Canyon shales	Canada	A chrysopid neuropteran.	
Baisochrysa pumila	Sp. nov	Valid	Khramov et al.	Late Jurassic	Karabastau Svita	Kazakhstan	A green lacewing.	
Baissoleon similis	Sp. nov	Valid	Shi, Winterton & Ren	Early Cretaceous	Yixian Formation	China	A nymphid neuropteran.	
Berothone	Gen. et comb. nov	Valid	Khramov	Late Jurassic		Kazakhstan	A beaded lacewing. A new genus for "Mesithone" protea Panfilov (1980); genus also contains "Mesithone" gracilis Panfilov (1980).	
Cratosmylus	Gen. et sp. nov	Valid	Myskowiak, Escuillié & Nel	Early Cretaceous	Crato Formation	Brazil	A neuropteran of uncertain phylogenetic placement; originally described as an osmylid, but Winterton et al. (2019) transferred it to the family Nymphidae. The type species is C. magnificus.	
Creagroparaberotha	Gen. et sp. nov	Valid	Makarkin	Late Cretaceous (early Cenomanian)	Burmese amber	Myanmar	A Paraberothinae beaded lacewing. The type species is C. groehni.	
Cretanallachius	Gen. et sp. nov	Valid	Huang et al.	Late Cretaceous (Cenomanian)	Burmese amber	Myanmar	Originally classified as a pleasing lacewing; subsequently considered to be a member of the superfamily Psychopsoidea of uncertain phylogenetic placement by Lu, Zhang & Liu (2016), while Liu et al. (2018) considered it to be a member of the family Kalligrammatidae. The type species is C. magnificus.	Cretanallachius magnificus
Curtogramma	Gen. et sp. nov	Valid	Yang et al.	Early Cretaceous	Yixian Formation	China	An aetheogrammatid neuropteran. The type species is C. ovatum.	
Cyclicogramma	Gen. et sp. nov	Valid	Yang et al.	Early Cretaceous	Yixian Formation	China	An aetheogrammatid neuropteran. The type species is C. rotundum.	
Daopsychops	Gen. et 5 sp. nov	Valid	Peng, Makarkin & Ren	Middle Jurassic	Daohugou Beds	China	An osmylopsychopid neuropteran. Five species: D. dissectus, D. clausus, D. inanis, D. bifasciatus and D. cubitalis.	
Elektroberotha	Gen. et sp. nov	Valid	Makarkin & Ohl	Eocene	Baltic amber	Europe (Baltic Sea coast)	A berothine berothid neuropteran. The type species is E. groehni.	
Eupypsychops	Gen. et 2 sp. nov	Valid	Peng, Makarkin & Ren	Middle Jurassic	Daohugou Beds	China	An osmylopsychopid neuropteran. Two species: E. ferox and E. confini.	
Gigantopsychops	Gen. et sp. nov	Valid	Peng, Makarkin & Ren	Middle Jurassic	Daohugou Beds	China	A psychopid neuropteran. The type species is G. reticulatus.	
Kalligramma delicatum	Sp. nov	Valid	Liu, Khramov & Zhang	Middle or Late Jurassic	Daohugou Beds	China	A kalligrammatid neuropteran	
Kalligrammula karatensis	Sp. nov	Valid	Liu et al.	Late Jurassic	Karabastau Svita	Kazakhstan	A kalligrammatid neuropteran	
Kalligrammula lata	Sp. nov	Valid	Liu et al.	Middle–Late Jurassic	Daohugou Beds	China	A kalligrammatid neuropteran	
Karataumantispa	Gen. et comb. nov	Valid	Jepson	Late Jurassic		Kazakhstan	A mantispid neuropteran; a new genus for "Mesithone" carnaria Khramov (2013) and "Mesithone" monstruosa Khramov (2013). Jepson, Khramov & Ohl (2018) transferred "Mesithone" monstruosa to the genus Ovalofemora.	
Krokhathone	Gen. et 2 sp. nov	Valid	Khramov	Late Jurassic	Karabastau Formation	Kazakhstan	A beaded lacewing. The type species is K. parva; genus also contains K. tristis.	
Lodevosisyra	Gen. et sp. nov	Valid	Prokop et al.	Permian (Guadalupian)	Salagou Formation	France	A permithonid neuropteran. The type species is L. reducta.	
Lodevothone	Gen. et sp. nov	Valid	Prokop et al.	Permian (Guadalupian)	Salagou Formation	France	A permithonid neuropteran. The type species is L. pectinata.	
Mesypochrysa sinica	Sp. nov	Junior homonym	Khramov et al.	Middle–Late Jurassic boundary interval	Daohugou Beds	China	A green lacewing. Makarkin, Simonsen & Perkovsky (2025) transferred the species "Drakochrysa" sinica Yang & Hong (1990) to the genus Mesypochrysa, making the species named by Khramov et al. a homonym of the species named by Yang & Hong, and established a replacement name Mesypochrysa khramovi for the species named by Khramov et al..	
Micromantispa	Gen. et sp. nov	Valid	Shi et al.	Cretaceous	Burmese amber	Myanmar	A mantispid or a paraberothine neuropteran. The type species is M. cristata.	
Nematopsychops	Gen. et sp. nov	Valid	Peng, Makarkin & Ren	Middle Jurassic	Daohugou Beds	China	An osmylopsychopid neuropteran. The type species is N. unicus.	
Ochropsychops	Gen. et sp. nov	Valid	Peng, Makarkin & Ren	Middle Jurassic	Daohugou Beds	China	An osmylopsychopid neuropteran. The type species is O. multus.	
Oligophlebiopsis	Gen. et sp. nov	Valid	Khramov & Makarkin	Early Jurassic		Kyrgyzstan	An osmylopsychopid neuropteran. The type species is O. biramosa.	
Osmylopsychoides	Gen. et sp. nov	Valid	Khramov & Makarkin	Late Early to early Middle Jurassic		Kyrgyzstan	An osmylopsychopid neuropteran. The type species is O. anteromedialis.	
Osmylopsychostoechus	Gen. et sp. nov	Valid	Khramov & Makarkin	Late Early to early Middle Jurassic		Kyrgyzstan	An osmylopsychopid neuropteran. The type species is O. sogulensis.	
Prosisyrina	Gen. et sp. nov	Valid	Perkovsky & Makarkin	Late Cretaceous (Santonian)	Taimyr amber	Russia	A spongillafly. The type species is P. sukachevae.	
Psychostoechotes	Gen. et sp. nov	Valid	Khramov & Makarkin	Late Early to early Middle Jurassic		Kyrgyzstan	An osmylopsychopid neuropteran. The type species is P. undulatus.	
Sialium minor	Sp. nov	Valid	Shi, Winterton & Ren	Early Cretaceous	Yixian Formation	China	A nymphid neuropteran. Originally described as a species of Sialium; Archibald & Makarkin (2020) transferred it to the genus Spilonymphes.	
Sialium sinicus	Sp. nov	Valid	Shi, Winterton & Ren	Early Cretaceous	Yixian Formation	China	A nymphid neuropteran.	
Sinosmylites auliensis	Sp. nov	Valid	Khramov	Late Jurassic	Karabastau Formation	Kazakhstan	A beaded lacewing, a species of Sinosmylites.	
Sinosmylites hotgoricus	Sp. nov	Valid	Khramov	Late Jurassic	Ulan-Ereg Formation	Mongolia	A beaded lacewing.	
Sinosmylites karatavicus	Sp. nov	Valid	Khramov	Late Jurassic	Karabastau Formation	Kazakhstan	A beaded lacewing.	
Spilonymphes	Gen. et sp. nov	Valid	Shi, Winterton & Ren	Early Cretaceous	Yixian Formation	China	A nymphid neuropteran. The type species is S. major.	
Stenopteropsychops	Gen. et sp. nov	Valid	Peng, Makarkin & Ren	Middle Jurassic	Daohugou Beds	China	An osmylopsychopid neuropteran. The type species is S. trifasciatus.	
Ulrikezza	Gen. et sp. nov	Valid	Fang, Ren & Wang	Middle Jurassic	Jiulongshan Formation	China	A saucrosmylid neuropteran. The type species is U. aspoeckae.	
Ypresioneura	Gen. et sp. nov	Valid	Archibald & Makarkin	Eocene; Ypresian	Eocene Okanagan Highlands; Tranquille Formation	Canada	A corydasialid lacewing The type species is Y. obscura. First suggested to be a megalopterans, later deemed a neuropteran.	

=== Raphidiopterans ===
Name	Novelty	Status	Authorship of new name	Age	Unit	Location	Notes	Images
Alloraphidia kyzylzharica	Sp. nov	Valid	Makarkin & Khramov	Late Cretaceous (early Turonian)		Kazakhstan	A snakefly, a species of Alloraphidia.	
Mesoraphidia daohugouensis	Sp. nov	Valid	Lü, Liu & Dong	Middle Jurassic	Jiulongshan Formation	China	A mesoraphidiid snakefly, a species of Mesoraphidia.	

== Clade †Palaeodictyopteroidea ==
Name	Novelty	Status	Authorship of new name	Age	Unit	Location	Notes	Images
Bizarrea	Gen. et sp. nov	Valid	Prokop et al.	Carboniferous (Moscovian)	Mazon Creek fossil beds	United States	A spilapterid palaeodictyopteran. The type species is Bizarrea obscura.	
Brodioptera sinensis	Sp. nov	Valid	Pecharová, Ren & Prokop	Carboniferous (Pennsylvanian)	Tupo Formation	China	A brodiopterid megasecopteran, a species of Brodioptera.	
Namuroptera	Gen. et sp. nov	Valid	Pecharová, Prokop & Ren	Carboniferous (early Pennsylvanian)	Tupo Formation	China	An aykhalid megasecopteran. The type species is Namuroptera minuta.	
Sinopalaeopteryx	Gen. et 2 sp. nov	Valid	Pecharová, Prokop & Ren	Carboniferous (early Pennsylvanian)	Tupo Formation	China	An aykhalid megasecopteran. Genus contains Sinopalaeopteryx olivieri and Sinopalaeopteryx splendens.	
Tytthospilaptera	Gen. et sp. nov	Valid	Liu et al.	Late Carboniferous		China	A palaeodictyopteran. The type species is Tytthospilaptera wangae.	
Xiaheyanella	Gen. et sp. nov	Valid	Fu et al.	Carboniferous (Namurian)	Tupo Formation	China	A calvertiellid palaeodictyopteran. The type species is Xiaheyanella orta.	

== Clade Palaeoptera ==
=== Ephemeropterans ===
Name	Novelty	Status	Authorship of new name	Age	Unit	Location	Notes	Images
Palegonympha	Gen. et sp. nov	Valid	Sinitshenkova et al.	Middle Triassic		Poland	A vogesonymphid mayfly. The type species is Palegonympha triassica.	
Triassolitophlebia	Gen. et sp. nov	Valid	Sinitshenkova et al.	Middle Triassic		Poland	A litophlebiid mayfly. The type species is Triassolitophlebia palegica.	

=== Odonatopterans ===
Name	Novelty	Status	Authorship of new name	Age	Unit	Location	Notes	Images
Cretadisparoneura	Gen. et sp. nov	Valid	Huang et al.	Cretaceous	Burmese amber	Myanmar	A damselfly, possibly a disparoneurine platycnemidid. The type species is Cretadisparoneura hongi.	
Daohugoulibellula	Gen. et sp. nov	Valid	Nel & Huang	Middle Jurassic	Daohugou Beds	China	A dragonfly belonging to the group Cavilabiata. The type species is Daohugoulibellula lini.	
Galloliupanshania	Gen. et sp. nov	Valid	Nel et al.	Late Cretaceous (early Cenomanian)		France	A liupanshaniid aeshnoid dragonfly. The type species is Galloliupanshania incompleta.	
Gallophlebia	Gen. et sp. nov	Valid	Nel et al.	Late Cretaceous (early Cenomanian)		France	A gallophlebiid libelluloid dragonfly. The type species is Gallophlebia magnifica.	
Gallostenophlebia	Gen. et sp. nov	Valid	Nel et al.	Late Cretaceous (early Cenomanian)		France	A stenophlebiid dragonfly. The type species is Gallostenophlebia incompleta.	
Huangiopterum	Gen. et sp. nov	Valid	Prokop et al.	Permian (Guadalupian)	Salagou Formation	France	A member of Odonatoptera. The type species is Huangiopterum lodevense.	
Inacayalestes	Gen. et sp. nov	Valid	Petrulevičius	Eocene (Ypresian)		Argentina	A damselfly belonging to the family Synlestidae. The type species is Inacayalestes aikunhuapi.	
Mesosticta	Gen. et sp. nov	Valid	Huang et al.	Cretaceous	Burmese amber	Myanmar	A damselfly, possibly a member of Platystictidae. The type species is Mesosticta burmatica.	
Petrolestes messelensis	Sp. nov	Valid	Garrouste & Nel	Eocene	Messel pit	Germany	A damselfly, a species of Petrolestes.	
Pseudostenolestes	Gen. et sp. nov	Valid	Garrouste & Nel	Eocene	Messel pit	Germany	A damsel-dragonfly belonging to the clade Isophlebioptera. The type species is Pseudostenolestes bechlyi.	
Urolibellula	Gen. et sp. nov	Valid	Zeiri, Nel & Garrouste	Eocene	Green River Formation	United States; Colorado	An Urolibellulidae libelluloid dragonfly. The type species is Urolibellula eocenica.	
Yixianstenophlebia	Gen. et sp. nov	Valid	Nel & Huang	Early Cretaceous	Yixian Formation	China	A stenophlebiid odonatan. The type species is Yixianstenophlebia magnifica.	

== Clade Paraneoptera ==
=== Hemipterans ===
Name	Novelty	Status	Authorship of new name	Age	Unit	Location	Notes	Images
Alacrena	Gen. et sp. nov	Valid	Vea & Grimaldi	Cretaceous (Albian-Cenomanian boundary)	Burmese amber	Myanmar	A scale insect found in Burmese amber. The type species is Alacrena peculiaris.	
Aneurus? incertus	Sp. nov	Valid	Heiss, Wappler & Wedmann	Middle Eocene	The Messel pit	Germany	An aradid heteropteran, possibly a species of Aneurus.	
Anthoscytina brevineura	Sp. nov	Valid	Chen, Wang & Zhang in Chen et al.	Middle Jurassic	Daohugou Beds	China	A procercopid cicadomorph, a relative of froghoppers; a species of Anthoscytina.	
Anthoscytina elegans	Sp. nov	Valid	Chen, Wang & Zhang in Chen et al.	Middle Jurassic	Daohugou Beds	China	A procercopid cicadomorph, a relative of froghoppers; a species of Anthoscytina.	
Anthoscytina hongi	Nom. nov	Valid	Chen, Wang & Zhang in Chen et al.	Middle Jurassic	Daohugou Beds	China	A procercopid cicadomorph, a relative of froghoppers; a replacement name for Sinotettegarcta longa Hong (1986).	
Apticoccus fortis	Sp. nov	Valid	Vea & Grimaldi	Early Cretaceous		Lebanon	A scale insect, a species of Apticoccus.	
Apticoccus longitenuis	Sp. nov	Valid	Vea & Grimaldi	Early Cretaceous		Lebanon	A scale insect, a species of Apticoccus.	
Archeoviparosiphum	Gen. et comb. nov	Valid	Żyła et al.	Early Cretaceous		China; Russia	An oviparosiphid aphidomorph. A new genus for "Oviparosiphum" baissense Shaposhnikov & Węgierek (1989); genus also contains "Paroviparosiphum" camptotropum Zhang, Zhang, Hou & Ma (1989), "Oviparosiphum" latum Hong & Wang (1990), "Mesoviparosiphum" malacum Zhang, Zhang, Hou & Ma (1989), "Paroviparosiphum" opimum Zhang, Zhang, Hou & Ma (1989) and "Mesoviparosiphum" tuanwangense Zhang, Zhang, Hou & Ma (1989).	
Aretsaya	Gen. et sp. nov	Valid	Drohojowska & Szwedo	Early Cretaceous		Lebanon	A whitefly found in Lebanese amber. The type species is Aretsaya therina.	
Baissotea	Gen. et 3 sp. nov	Valid	Ryzhkova	Early Cretaceous		Mongolia; Russia	A member of Saldidae. The type species is Baissotea infanta; genus also contains Baissotea peregrina and Baissotea popovi.	
Bajsaphis abbreviata	Sp. nov	Valid	Homan, Żyła & Węgierek	Early Cretaceous		Russia	A bajsaphidid aphid, a species of Bajsaphis.	
Bajsaphis cuspidata	Sp. nov	Valid	Homan, Żyła & Węgierek	Early Cretaceous		Russia	A bajsaphidid aphid, a species of Bajsaphis.	
Bajsaphis eridmata	Sp. nov	Valid	Homan, Żyła & Węgierek	Early Cretaceous		Russia	A bajsaphidid aphid, a species of Bajsaphis.	
Bajsaphis pulchra	Sp. nov	Valid	Homan, Żyła & Węgierek	Early Cretaceous		Russia	A bajsaphidid aphid, a species of Bajsaphis.	
Burmametra	Gen. et sp. nov	Valid	Huang et al.	Cretaceous (Albian or Cenomanian)	Burmese amber	Myanmar	A water measurer. The type species is Burmametra macrocarinata.	
Carsburgia	Gen. et sp. nov	Valid	Lambkin	Late Triassic (Norian)	Blackstone Formation	Australia	A dysmorphoptilid cicadomorph. The type species is Carsburgia knezouri.	
Chalicoridulum	Gen. et sp. nov	Valid	Szwedo & Ansorge	Early Cretaceous		Spain	A mimarachnid planthopper. The type species is Chalicoridulum montsecensis.	
Curvicaudus spinosus	Sp. nov	Valid	Tang et al.	Early Cretaceous	Yixian Formation	China	A vetanthocorid cimicoid, a species of Curvicaudus.	
Daoaphis	Gen. et sp. nov	Valid	Huang et al.	Middle Jurassic	Daohugou Beds	China	An oviparosiphid aphidoid. The type species is Daoaphis magnalata.	
Dysmorphoptiloides ellisi	Sp. nov	Valid	Lambkin	Middle Triassic (Anisian)	Gayndah Formation	Australia	A dysmorphoptilid cicadomorph, a species of Dysmorphoptiloides.	
Emesopsis putshkovi	Sp. nov	Valid	Popov & Chłond	Late Eocene		Europe (Baltic Sea coast)	A thread-legged bug found in Baltic amber, a species of Emesopsis.	
Emesopsis similis	Sp. nov	Valid	Popov & Chłond	Late Eocene		Europe (Baltic Sea coast)	A thread-legged bug found in Baltic amber, a species of Emesopsis.	
Euroscytina	Gen. et sp. nov	Valid	Prokop et al.	Permian (Guadalupian)	Salagou Formation	France	A member of Cicadomorpha belonging to the family Scytinopteridae. The type species is Euroscytina lutevanorum.	
Gesaris	Gen. et sp. nov	Valid	Szwedo, Stroiński & Lin	Paleocene	Niubao Formation	China	A lophopid planthopper. The type species is Gesaris gnapo.	
Gilderius	Gen. et sp. nov	Valid	Vea & Grimaldi	Cretaceous (Albian-Cenomanian boundary)	Burmese amber	Myanmar	A mealybug. The type species is Gilderius eukrinops.	
Gyaclavator	Gen. et sp. nov	Valid	Wappler et al.	Eocene; Latest Ypresian	Green River Formation	United States; Colorado	A lacebug of uncertain family affiliation. The type species is G. kohlsi.	Gyaclavator kohlsi
Hallodapomimus antennatus	Sp. nov	Valid	Herczek & Popov	Eocene		Russia (Kaliningrad Oblast)	A phyline mirid found in Baltic amber, a species of Hallodapomimus.	
Heteromargarodes hukamsinghi	Sp. nov	Valid	Vea & Grimaldi	Paleocene-Eocene	Cambay Formation	India	A member of Margarodidae found in Cambay amber, a species of Heteromargarodes.	
Hodgsonicoccus	Gen. et sp. nov	Valid	Vea & Grimaldi	Early Cretaceous		Lebanon	A scale insect. The type species is Hodgsonicoccus patefactus.	
Kozarius	Gen. et 2 sp. nov	Valid	Vea & Grimaldi	Cretaceous (Albian-Cenomanian boundary)	Burmese amber	Myanmar	A scale insect. The type species is Kozarius perpetuus; genus also contains Kozarius achronus.	
Longilanceolatus	Gen. et sp. nov	Valid	Tang et al.	Early Cretaceous	Yixian Formation	China	A vetanthocorid cimicoid. The type species is Longilanceolatus tenellus.	
Lutevanaphis	Gen. et sp. nov	Valid	Szwedo, Lapeyrie & Nel	Permian (Guadalupian)	Salagou Formation	France	A lutevanaphidid aphidomorph. The type species is Lutevanaphis permiana.	
Magnilens	Gen. et sp. nov	Valid	Vea & Grimaldi	Cretaceous (Albian-Cenomanian boundary)	Burmese amber	Myanmar	A scale insect. The type species is Magnilens glaesaria.	
Mezira parapetrificata	Sp. nov	Valid	Heiss, Wappler & Wedmann	Middle Eocene	The Messel pit	Germany	A mezirine aradid heteropteran, a species of Mezira.	
Mezira petrificata	Sp. nov	Valid	Heiss, Wappler & Wedmann	Middle Eocene	The Messel pit	Germany	A mezirine aradid heteropteran, a species of Mezira.	
Milqartis	Gen. et sp. nov	Valid	Drohojowska & Szwedo	Early Cretaceous		Lebanon	A whitefly found in Lebanese amber. The type species is Milqartis azari.	
Mimamontsecia	Gen. et sp. nov	Valid	Szwedo & Ansorge	Early Cretaceous		Spain	A mimarachnid planthopper. The type species is Mimamontsecia cretacea.	
Normarkicoccus	Gen. et sp. nov	Valid	Vea & Grimaldi	Early Eocene (Ypresian)	Cambay Shale Formation	India	A member of Diaspididae found in Cambay amber. The type species is Normarkicoccus cambayae.	
Palaeophlebus	Gen. et 2 sp. nov	Valid	Simon & Żyła	Eocene		Europe (Baltic Sea coast)	A monophlebid scale insect found in Baltic amber. Genus contains two species: P. hoffeinorum and P. kotejai.	
Paratettigarcta	Gen. et sp. nov	Valid	Kaulfuss & Moulds	Early Miocene		New Zealand	A hairy cicada. The type species is Paratettigarcta zealandica.	
Pedicellicoccus	Gen. et sp. nov	Valid	Vea & Grimaldi	Cretaceous (Albian-Cenomanian boundary)	Burmese amber	Myanmar	A scale insect. The type species is Pedicellicoccus marginatus.	
Permopsyllidium lesclansis	Sp. nov	Valid	Prokop et al.	Permian (Guadalupian)	Salagou Formation	France	A member of Sternorrhyncha belonging to the superfamily Psylloidea and the family Protopsyllidiidae, a species of Permopsyllidium.	
Pityococcus moniliformalis	Sp. nov	Valid	Vea & Grimaldi	Eocene		Russia (Kaliningrad Oblast)	A pityococcid scale insect found in Baltic amber, a species of Pityococcus.	
Prosbole dio	Sp. nov	Valid	Prokop et al.	Permian (Guadalupian)	Salagou Formation	France	A member of Cicadomorpha belonging to the family Prosbolidae, a species of Prosbole.	
Prosbole garrici	Sp. nov	Valid	Prokop et al.	Permian (Guadalupian)	Salagou Formation	France	A member of Cicadomorpha belonging to the family Prosbolidae, a species of Prosbole.	
Psallops bitterfeldi	Sp. nov	Valid	Herczek, Popov & Gorczyca	Eocene	Bitterfeld amber	Germany	A member of Miridae belonging to the subfamily Psallopinae, a species of Psallops.	
Psallops eocenicus	Sp. nov	Valid	Herczek, Popov & Gorczyca	Eocene	Baltic amber	Europe (Baltic Sea coast)	A member of Miridae belonging to the subfamily Psallopinae, a species of Psallops.	
Pseudoweitschatus	Gen. et sp. nov	Valid	Vea & Grimaldi	Cretaceous (Albian-Cenomanian boundary)	Burmese amber	Myanmar	A weitschatid scale insect. The type species is Pseudoweitschatus audebertis.	
Quizqueiplana	Gen. et sp. nov	Valid	Bourgoin, Wang & Gnezdilov	Early Miocene		Dominican Republic	An augiline caliscelid planthopper found in Dominican amber. The type species is Quizqueiplana alexbrowni.	
Rosahendersonia	Gen. et sp. nov	Valid	Vea & Grimaldi	Cretaceous (Albian-Cenomanian boundary)	Burmese amber	Myanmar	A Coccidae scale insect. The type species is Rosahendersonia prisca.	
Rovnodicus	Gen. et sp. nov	Valid	Drohojowska & Szwedo in Drohojowska, Perkovsky & Szwedo	Eocene (Lutetian-Priabonian)		Ukraine	A whitefly found in Rovno amber. The type species is Rovnodicus wojciechowskii.	
Secusellinaphis	Gen. et sp. nov	Valid	Żyła & Węgierek	Late Jurassic/Early Cretaceous		Mongolia	An ellinaphidid aphid. The type species is Secusellinaphis khotontensis.	
Sehirus carpathiensis	Sp. nov	Valid	Lis, Vršanský & Schlögl in Vršanský et al.	Miocene	Lakšárska Nová Ves Formation	Slovakia	A member of Cydnidae, a species of Sehirus.	
Shapashe	Gen. et sp. nov	Valid	Drohojowska & Szwedo	Early Cretaceous		Lebanon	A whitefly found in Lebanese amber. The type species is Shapashe aithiopa.	
Stellularis	Gen. et sp. et comb. nov	Valid	Chen, Yao & Ren	Early Cretaceous	Yixian Formation	China	A procercopid cicadomorph. The type species is Stellularis longirostris; genus also contains "Anthoscytina" aphthosa Ren, Yin & Dou (1998) and "Anthoscytina" macula Hu, Yao & Ren (2014).	
Tennentsia evansi	Sp. nov	Valid	Lambkin	Middle Triassic (Anisian)	Gayndah Formation	Australia	A dysmorphoptilid cicadomorph, a species of Tennentsia.	
Tennentsia princeps	Sp. nov	Valid	Lambkin	Late Triassic (Norian)	Mount Crosby Formation	Australia	A dysmorphoptilid cicadomorph, a species of Tennentsia.	
Thaumastotingis	Gen. et sp. nov	Valid	Heiss & Golub	Eocene		Europe (Baltic Sea coast)	A cimicomorph, probably a member of Thaumastocoridae, found in Baltic amber. The type species is Thaumastotingis areolatus.	
Tingiometra	Gen. et sp. nov	Valid	Heiss, Golub & Popov	Late Cretaceous (Cenomanian)	Burmese amber	Myanmar	A member of Tingidae. The type species is Tingiometra burmanica.	
Titanocercopis	Gen. et sp. nov	Valid	Chen, Zhang & Wang in Chen et al.	Middle Jurassic	Jiulongshan Formation	China	A procercopid cicadomorph, a relative of froghoppers. The type species is Titanocercopis borealis.	
Vescisalignus	Gen. et sp. nov	Valid	Chen, Yao & Ren	Early Cretaceous	Yixian Formation	China	A member of Rhopalidae. The type species is Vescisalignus indecorus.	
Vetellinaphis	Gen. et 2 sp. nov	Valid	Żyła & Węgierek	Late Jurassic/Early Cretaceous		Mongolia	An ellinaphidid aphid. Genus contains two species: Vetellinaphis cracens and Vetellinaphis longalata.	
Wathondara	Gen. et sp. nov	Valid	Simon, Szwedo & Xia in Wang et al.	Cretaceous (Cenomanian)	Burmese amber	Myanmar	An ensign scale. The type species is Wathondara kotejai.	Wathondara kotejai
Williamsicoccus	Gen. et sp. nov	Valid	Vea & Grimaldi	Early Cretaceous		Lebanon	A mealybug. The type species is Williamsicoccus megalops.	
Wojciechaphis	Gen. et sp. nov	Valid	Węgierek & Kania in Węgierek, Kania & Zmarzły	Eocene		Europe (Baltic Sea coast)	A member of Drepanosiphidae found in Baltic amber. The type species is Wojciechaphis andrei.	
Xiphos	Sp. nov	Valid	Vea & Grimaldi	Early Cretaceous		Lebanon	A scale insect. The type species is Xiphos vani.	
Yamis	Gen. et sp. nov	Valid	Drohojowska & Szwedo	Early Cretaceous		Lebanon	A whitefly found in Lebanese amber. The type species is Yamis libanotos.	

=== Psocodea ===
Name	Novelty	Status	Authorship of new name	Age	Unit	Location	Notes	Images
Atapinella	Gen. et sp. nov	Valid	Azar et al.	Late Cretaceous (earliest Cenomanian)	Burmese amber	Myanmar	A pachytroctid booklice. Type species is Atapinella garroustei.	
Burmipachytrocta	Gen. et sp. nov	Valid	Azar et al.	Late Cretaceous (earliest Cenomanian)	Burmese amber	Myanmar	A pachytroctid booklice. Type species is Burmipachytrocta singularis.	
Libaneuphoris	Gen. et sp. nov	Valid	Azar et al.	Early Cretaceous (late Barremian/earliest Aptian)		Lebanon	A pachytroctid booklice. Type species is Libaneuphoris jantopi.	

=== Thysanoptera ===
Name	Novelty	Status	Authorship of new name	Age	Unit	Location	Notes	Images
Merothrips balticus	Sp. nov	Valid	Ulitzka	Eocene		Europe (Baltic Sea coast)	A thrips belonging to the family Merothripidae.	
Mymarothrips groehni	Sp. nov	Valid	Ulitzka	Eocene		Europe (Baltic Sea coast)	An aeolothripid thrips, a species of Mymarothrips.	
Rhipidothripoides juttae	Sp. nov	Valid	Ulitzka	Eocene		Europe (Baltic Sea coast)	An aeolothripid thrips, a species of Rhipidothripoides.	

== Clade †Paoliidea ==
=== †Paoliida ===
Name	Novelty	Status	Authorship of new name	Age	Unit	Location	Notes	Images
Afrocladus	Gen. et 2 sp. nov	Valid	Nel, Garrouste & Prokop	Permian—Triassic boundary	Maji ya Chumvi Formation	Kenya	A member of Anthracoptilidae . Genus contains two species: A. pumilio and A. kenyaensis.	
Graticladus apiatus	Sp. nov	Valid	Aristov & Rasnitsyn	Early Permian (Kungurian)	Koshelevka Formation	Russia	A member of Hypoperlida belonging to the family Ischnoneuridae, a species of Graticladus.	
Lodevocladus	Gen. et sp. nov	Valid	Prokop et al.	Permian (Guadalupian)	Salagou Formation	France	A member of Anthracoptilidae. The type species is Lodevocladus subtilis.	
Strephocladus gandi	Sp. nov	Valid	Prokop et al.	Permian (Guadalupian)	Salagou Formation	France	A member of Anthracoptilidae, a species of Strephocladus.	
Strephocladus mouralensis	Sp. nov	Valid	Prokop et al.	Permian (Guadalupian)	Salagou Formation	France	A member of Anthracoptilidae, a species of Strephocladus.	
Tshekardocladus	Gen. et sp. nov	Valid	Aristov & Rasnitsyn	Early Permian (Kungurian)	Koshelevka Formation	Russia	A member of Hypoperlida belonging to the family Tococladidae. The type species is Tshekardocladus sparsus.	

== Clade Perlidea ==
=== Dermapterans ===
Name	Novelty	Status	Authorship of new name	Age	Unit	Location	Notes	Images
Autrigonoforceps	Gen. et sp. nov	Valid	Engel & Peris in Engel et al.	Early Cretaceous		Spain	An earwig of uncertain phylogenetic placement. Type species is Autrigonoforceps iberica.	
Cylindopygia	Gen. et sp. nov	Valid	Yang, Shih & Ren	Early Cretaceous	Yixian Formation	China	A pygidicranid earwig. Type species is Cylindopygia falcata.	

=== Embiopterans ===
Name	Novelty	Status	Authorship of new name	Age	Unit	Location	Notes	Images
Nestorembia	Gen. et sp. nov	Valid	Shcherbakov	Triassic (Ladinian-Carnian)	Madygen Formation	Kyrgyzstan	A webspinner belonging to the family Alexarasniidae. The type species is Nestorembia novojilovi.	
Nikolembia	Gen. et sp. nov	Valid	Shcherbakov	Latest Permian or earliest Triassic	Mal'tsevo Formation	Russia	A webspinner belonging to the family Alexarasniidae. The type species is Nikolembia kusnezovi.	

=== Phasmatodeans ===
Name	Novelty	Status	Authorship of new name	Age	Unit	Location	Notes	Images
Arachnophasma	Gen. et sp. nov	Valid	Aristov & Rasnitsyn	Early Permian (Kungurian)	Koshelevka Formation	Russia	A relative of stick insects belonging to the family Permophasmatidae. The type species is Arachnephasma scurra.	
Eoprephasma	Gen. et sp. nov	Valid	Archibald & Bradler	Ypresian	Klondike Mountain Formation	United States	A Susumanioidea stem group Phasmatodean	

== Clade †Reculida ==
Name	Novelty	Status	Authors	Age	Type locality	Location	Notes	Images
Arkhangeloptera	Gen. et sp. nov	Valid	Aristov	Middle Permian (Kazanian)	Iva-Gora beds	Russia	A Reculida and the family Chaulioditidae. The type species is Arkhangeloptera sokica.	
Artinska novella	Sp. nov	Valid	Aristov	Middle Permian (Kazanian)	Belebeevo Formation	Russia	A Reculidan and the family Lemmatophoridae; a species of Artinska.	
Chauliodites incanus	Sp. nov	Valid	Aristov	Middle Permian (Urzhumian)	Amanak Formation	Russia	A Reculidan of the family Chaulioditidae a species of Chauliodites.	
Chelopterum ultimum	Sp. nov	Valid	Aristov & Rasnitsyn	Early Permian (Kungurian)	Koshelevka Formation	Russia	A Reculidan and the family Chelopteridae, a species of Chelopterum.	
Geinitzia ima	Sp. nov	Valid	Aristov	Middle Permian (Kazanian)	Iva-Gora beds	Russia	A Reculidan and the family Geinitziidae; a species of Geinitzia.	
Idelopterum	Gen. et sp. nov	Valid	Aristov	Middle Permian (Kazanian)	Iva-Gora beds	Russia	A Reculidan of the family Pinideliidae. The type species is Idelopterum samoedum.	
Permoshurabia komi	Sp. nov	Valid	Aristov	Middle Permian (Ufimian)	Lek-Vorkuta Formation	Russia	A Reculidan of the family Geinitziidae a species of Permoshurabia.	
Permoshurabia kungurica	Sp. nov	Valid	Aristov & Rasnitsyn	Early Permian (Kungurian)	Koshelevka Formation	Russia	A Reculidan of the family Geinitziidae a species of Permoshurabia.	
Permovalia	Gen. et sp. nov	Valid	Aristov	Middle Permian (Kazanian)	Belebeevo Formation	Russia	A Reculidan of the family Geinitziidae. The type species is Permovalia abortiva.	
Shurabia inferior	Sp. nov	Valid	Aristov	Middle Permian (Kazanian)	Iva-Gora beds	Russia	A Reculidan of the family Geinitziidae a species of Shurabia.	
Stegopterum primus	Sp. nov	Valid	Aristov	Middle Permian (Kazanian)	Iva-Gora beds	Russia	A Reculidan of the family Geinitziidae a species of Stegopterum.	
Sylvaella martynovi	Sp. nov	Valid	Aristov	Middle Permian (Kazanian)	Iva-Gora beds	Russia	A Reculida of the family Liomopteridae a species of Sylvaella.	
Sylvaphlebia gunderseni	Sp. nov	Valid	Aristov	Middle Permian (Kazanian)	Iva-Gora beds	Russia	A Reculida of the family Sylvaphlebiidae a species of Sylvaphlebia.	
Sylviodes martynovae	Sp. nov	Valid	Aristov	Middle Permian (Kazanian)	Iva-Gora beds	Russia	A Reculidan of the family Sylvaphlebiidae a species of Sylviodes.	
Uraloprisca torta	Sp. nov	Valid	Aristov	Middle Permian (Kazanian)	Iva-Gora beds	Russia	A Reculidan of the family Lemmatophoridae a species of Uraloprisca.	

== Other insects ==
Name	Novelty	Status	Authorship of new name	Age	Unit	Location	Notes	Images
Batkentak	Gen. et sp. nov	Valid	Aristov	Triassic (Ladinian or Carnian)	Madygen Formation	Kyrgyzstan	A member of Grylloblattida/Eoblattida belonging to the family Daldubidae. The type species is Batkentak intactus.	
Belebey	Gen. et sp. nov	Junior homonym	Aristov	Permian (Kazanian)	Belebeevo Formation	Russia	A member of Grylloblattida/Eoblattida belonging to the family Permotermopsidae. The type species is Belebey mutilus. The generic name is a junior homonym of Belebey Ivakhnenko (1973); Aristov (2019) coined a replacement name Belebeus.	
Cavalarva	Gen. et sp. nov	Valid	Aristov & Rasnitsyn	Early Permian (Kungurian)	Koshelevka Formation	Russia	A member of Holometabola of uncertain phylogenetic placement. The type species is Cavalarva caudata.	
Idelina mala	Sp. nov	Valid	Aristov	Middle Permian (Kazanian)	Belebeevo Formation	Russia	A member of Grylloblattida/Eoblattida belonging to the family Permotermopsidae, a species of Idelina.	
Issadophlebia	Gen. et sp. nov	Valid	Aristov	Late Permian (Severodvinian)	Poldarsa Formation	Russia	A member of Grylloblattida/Eoblattida belonging to the family Atactophlebiidae. The type species is Issadophlebia fusa.	
Iva	Gen. et sp. nov	Junior homonym	Aristov	Middle Permian (Kazanian)	Iva-Gora beds	Russia	A member of Grylloblattida/Eoblattida belonging to the family Doubraviidae. The type species is Iva permiana. The generic name is a junior homonym of the pontellid Iva Lubbock (1853).	
Jubala	Gen. et comb. nov	Valid	Aristov & Rasnitsyn	Early Permian (Kungurian)	Koshelevka Formation	Russia	A member of Grylloblattida/Eoblattida belonging to the family Euryptilonidae; a new genus for "Sylvardembia" pectinata Novokshonov, (2000).	
Koshelevka	Gen. et comb. nov	Valid	Aristov	Early Permian (Kungurian)	Koshelevka Formation	Russia	A member of Grylloblattida/Eoblattida belonging to the family Doubraviidae. The type species is "Cerasopterum" megakhosaroides Aristov (2004).	
Lodevophlebia	Gen. et sp. nov	Valid	Prokop et al.	Permian (Guadalupian)	Salagou Formation	France	A member of Grylloblattida (an extinct group of insect containing putative relatives of extant grylloblattids) belonging to the family Sylvaphlebiidae. The type species is Lodevophlebia reticulata.	
Lomovatka	Gen. et sp. nov	Valid	Aristov	Late Carboniferous	Isaeva Formation	Ukraine	A member of Grylloblattida/Eoblattida belonging to the family Eoblattidae. The type species is Lomovatka udovichenkoi.	
Magniscapa	Gen. et comb. nov	Valid	Shcherbakov	Permian (early Kazanian)	Iva-Gora Beds	Russia	A member of Protorthoptera, possibly a member of the family Sheimiidae; a new genus for "Pseudosheimia" alligans Aristov & Rasnitsyn (2009).	
Malmyzhia	Gen. et sp. nov	Valid	Aristov	Permian (Kazanian)	Belebeevo Formation	Russia	A member of Grylloblattida/Eoblattida belonging to the family Atactophlebiidae. The type species is Malmyzhia kazanica.	
Megakhosarella paula	Sp. nov	Valid	Aristov	Middle Permian (Kazanian)	Iva-Gora beds	Russia	A member of Grylloblattida/Eoblattida belonging to the family Megakhosaridae, a species of Megakhosarella.	
Montceaupterum	Gen. et sp. nov	Valid	Myskowiak, Pouillon & Nel	Late Carboniferous (Gzhelian)		France	A euryptilonid grylloblattodean. The type species is Montceaupterum baillyi.	
Novokshonovus	Gen. et 2 sp. nov	Valid	Aristov & Rasnitsyn	Early and middle Permian (Kungurian to Ufimian)	Koshelevka Formation; Pechora Group	Russia	A member of Grylloblattida/Eoblattida belonging to the family Atactophlebiidae. The type species is Novokshonovus ignoratus Aristov & Rasnitsyn; genus also includes Novokshonovus boreus Aristov.	
Oborella lodevensis	Sp. nov	Valid	Prokop et al.	Permian (Guadalupian)	Salagou Formation	France	A member of Grylloblattida (an extinct group of insect containing putative relative of extant grylloblattids) belonging to the family Euryptilonidae, a species of Oborella.	
Parastenaropodites stirps	Sp. nov	Valid	Aristov & Rasnitsyn	Early Permian (Kungurian)	Koshelevka Formation	Russia	A member of Grylloblattida/Eoblattida belonging to the family Mesorthopteridae, a species of Parastenaropodites.	
Permobaharellus	Gen. et sp. nov	Valid	Prokop et al.	Permian (Guadalupian)	Salagou Formation	France	A member of Grylloblattida (an extinct group of insect containing putative relative of extant grylloblattids). The type species is Permobaharellus salagousensis.	
Permopectina sibirica	Sp. nov	Valid	Aristov	Middle Permian (Kazanian)	Usyatka Formation	Russia	A member of Grylloblattida/Eoblattida belonging to the family Permopectinidae, a species of Permopectina.	
Pintopinna	Gen. et comb. nov	Valid	Aristov	Early Permian (Sakmarian)	Boituva Formation	Brazil	A member of Grylloblattida/Eoblattida belonging to the family Protophasmatidae; a new genus for "Paranarkemina" martinsnetoi Pinto (1999).	
Sinonele	Gen. et 4 sp. nov	Valid	Cui et al.	Middle Jurassic	Daohugou Beds	China	A member of the family Bajanzhargalanidae, a possible relative of ice crawlers. Genus contains four species: Sinonele fangi, Sinonele hei, Sinonele phasmoides and Sinonele mini.	
Suksunus	Gen. et sp. nov	Valid	Aristov	Early Permian (Kungurian)	Koshelevka Formation	Russia	A member of Grylloblattida/Eoblattida belonging to the family Cacurgidae. The type species is Suksunus bicodex.	
Taskanatus	Gen. et comb. nov	Valid	Aristov	Permian (Urzhumian)	Maichat Formation	Kazakhstan	A member of Grylloblattida/Eoblattida belonging to the family Mesorthopteridae. The type species is "Alicula" asiatica Storozhenko (1997).	
