= Bryophaenocladius chrissichuckorum =

Scientific classification
- Kingdom: Animalia
- Phylum: Arthropoda
- Class: Insecta
- Order: Diptera
- Family: Chironomidae
- Genus: Bryophaenocladius
- Species: B. chrissichuckorum

Binomial name
- Bryophaenocladius chrissichuckorum J.H Epler, 2012

Species of Chironomid

Bryophaenocladius chrissichuckorum, or Spooner's flightless midge, is a species of chironomid endemic to the state of Georgia. Discovered in the late 1990s and described in 2012, this species is only known from specific granite outcrops in the Georgia Piedmont.
