= Salagou Formation =

Geologic formation in France

- Stratigraphic range: Permian
- Type: Formation

Location
- Country: France

The Salagou Formation is a geologic formation in France. It preserves fossils dating back to the Permian period.

== Geology ==
The Salagou Formation is a fine-grained loessite which is a deposit of red mudstone. It was created by the Montage Noire Dome.

== Fauna ==
The formation is known for its diverse and numerous insect fossils.

Caloneurodea

genus	species	locality	age	classification
Nanogramma	N. gandi	F34, Les Vignasses	Artinskian	
Jarmiloptera	J. mouralensis	F34, Les Vignasses	Artinskian	

Cnemidolestodea

genus	species	locality	age	classification
Tococladus	T. garrici	F30, Sallèles & F19, Arièges	Artinskian & Kungurian	A member of Tococladidae.

Diaphanopterodea

genus	species	locality	age	classification
Lodevohymen	lapeyriei	F23, Les Canals	Kungurian	
Phaneroneura	P. minuta	F19, Arièges & F28, Notre Dame des Clans	Artinskian & Kungurian	A member of Martynoviidae.
Salagouneura	S. chimaira	F19, Arièges & F28, Notre Dame des Clans	Artinskian & Kungurian	A member of Martynoviidae.
Alexrasnitsynia	A. permiana	(unspecified)	Kungurian	A member of Alexrasnitsyniidae.
Permelmoa	P. magnifica	F34, Les Vignasses	Artinskian	A member of Parelmoidae.

Glosselytrodea

genus	species	locality	age	classification
Surijoka	S. lutevensis	F23, Les Canals	Kungurian	A member of Jurinidae

Hemiptera

genus	species	locality	age	classification
Euroscytinia	E. lutevanorum	F19, Arièges	Kungurian	A member of Scytinopteridae
Lutevanaphis	L. permiana	F34, Les Vignasses	Artinskian	A member of Lutevanaphididae
Permopsyllidium	P. lesclansis	F28, Notre Dame des Clans	Artinskian	A member of Permopsyllidiidae
Prosbole	P. dio	F20, Dio	Kungurian	A member of Prosbolidae
Prosbole	P. garrici	Les Singles	Kungurian	A member of Prosbolidae

Megasecoptera

genus	species	locality	age	classification
Sinitshenkovae	S. gallica	F23, Les Canals	Kungurian	A member of Xenopteraidae

Neuroptera

genus	species	locality	age	classification
Permoneuroptera	P. lapeyriea		Kungurian	A member of Permoneuropteridae

Notoptera

Depressopterum	D. minutus	F19, Arièges	Kungurian	A member of Liomopteridae
Lodevopterum	L. angustus	F31, Bouisset	Kungurian	A member of Euremiscidae
Lodevoisadia	L. coheni	Near Lodève	Kungurian	A member of Grylloblattodea
Oborella	O. lodevensis	F40, Le Moural B	Kungurian	A member of Lemmatophoridae
Permobaharellus	P. salagousensis	F34, Les Vignasses	Artinskian	A member of Grylloblattodea

Odonatoptera

genus	species	locality	age	classification
Epilestes	E. gallica	F23, Les Canals	Kungurian	A member of Permagrionoidea
Huangiopterum	H. lodevense	F38, Saut des Vaches	Kungurian	A member of Huangiopteridae
Lapeyria	L. magnifica	F23, Les Canals	Kungurian	A member of Lapeyriidae
Lodevia	L. longialata	F31, Bouisset, F21D, Le Moural D	Artinskian & Kungurian	A member of Permagrionidae
Salagoulestes	S. wesleyi	La Prade	Kungurian	A member of Permagrionidae
Saxonagrion	S. minutus	F23, Les Canals	Kungurian	A member of Saxonagrionidae

Meganisoptera

genus	species	locality	age	classification
Arctotypus	A. gallicus	F34, Les Vignasses, F23, Les Canals	Artinskian & Kungurian	A member of Meganeuridae
Arctotypus	A. intermedius	F41, Le Mourrel, F45, Rieu Peyre-la Boutine	Kungurian	A member of Meganeuridae
Arctotypus	A. merifonsensis	F41, Le Mourrel	Kungurian	A member of Meganeuridae
Curvitupus	C. ariengensis	F19, Arièges	Kungurian	A member of Meganeuridae
Nannotupus	N. pumilio	F40, Le Devès, F45, Rieu Peyre-la Boutine	Kungurian	A member of Meganeuridae
Permotupus	P. minor	F44, Le Planas	Kungurian	A member of Meganeuridae
Permotupus	P. ollieorum	F41, Le Mourrel	Kungurian	A member of Meganeuridae
Tupus	T. gallicus	F41, Le Mourrel	Kungurian	A member of Meganeuridae

Orthoptera

genus	species	locality	age	classification
Bethouxia	B. ariegensis	F19, Arièges	Kungurian	A member of Archaeorthoptera
Crinoedischia	C. lapeyriei	F19, Arièges	Kungurian	A member of Proparagryllacrididae
Iasvia	I. reticulata	F28, Notre Dame des Clans, F32, Col des Détroits, F34, Les Vignasses, F45, Rieu Peyre-la Boutine	Artinskian & Kungurian	A member of Oedischiidae
Iasvia	I. secunda	F28, Notre Dame des Clans	Artinskian	A member of Oedischiidae
Lodevolongzhua	L. incompleta	F21, Le Saut	Artinskian	A member of Archaeorthoptera
Permophyllum	P. rotundatum	F32, Col des Détroits, F21, Le Moural	Kungurian	
Permostridulus	P. brongniarti	F21, Dio, F40, Le Devès, F41, Le Mourrel	Kungurian	A member of Permostridulidae
Raphogla	R. rubra	F21D, Le Moural D	Artinskian	A member of Raphoglidae

Paoliida

genus	species	locality	age	classification
Lodevocladus	L. subtilis	F40, Le Devès	Kungurian	A member of Anthracoptilidae
Permotermospis	P. gallica		Kungurian	A member of Anthracoptilidae
Strephocladus	S. gandi	F19, Arièges	Kungurian	A member of Anthracoptilidae
Strephocladus	S. mouralensis	F21, Le Moural	Artinskian	A member of Anthracoptilidae
Strephocladus	S. permianus	(unspecified)	Kungurian	A member of Anthracoptilidae

Palaeodictyoptera

genus	species	locality	age	classification
Lodetiella	L. magnifica	La Lieude farm	Kungurian	A member of Calvertiellidae

Reculida

genus	species	locality	age	classification
Lodevophlebia	L. reticulata	F21D, Le Moural D	Artinskian	A member of Sylvaphlebiidae

Other insects

genus	species	locality	age	classification
Permoponopteryx	P. lodevensis	F34, Les Vignasses, F23, Les Canals	Artinskian & Kungurian	Unknown affinities

== See also ==
- List of fossiliferous stratigraphic units in France
- Salagou
