= Bryophaenocladius =

Scientific classification
- Kingdom: Animalia
- Phylum: Arthropoda
- Clade: Pancrustacea
- Class: Insecta
- Order: Diptera
- Family: Chironomidae
- Subfamily: Orthocladiinae
- Genus: Bryophaenocladius; Thienemann, 1934

Genus of flies

Bryophaenocladius is a genus of non-biting midges in the subfamily Orthocladiinae of the bloodworm family (Chironomidae).

== Species ==
- Bryophaenocladius chrissichuckorum J.H Epler, 2012
- Bryophaenocladius humerosus Wang et al., 1934
- Bryophaenocladius kolkataensis Som et al., 2023
- Bryophaenocladius mucronatus Lin et al., 2012
- Bryophaenocladius paricterius Lin et al., 2012
- Bryophaenocladius pollexus Som et al., 2023
- Bryophaenocladius pichinensis Wang et al., 1934
- Bryophaenocladius simplex Wang et al., 1934
