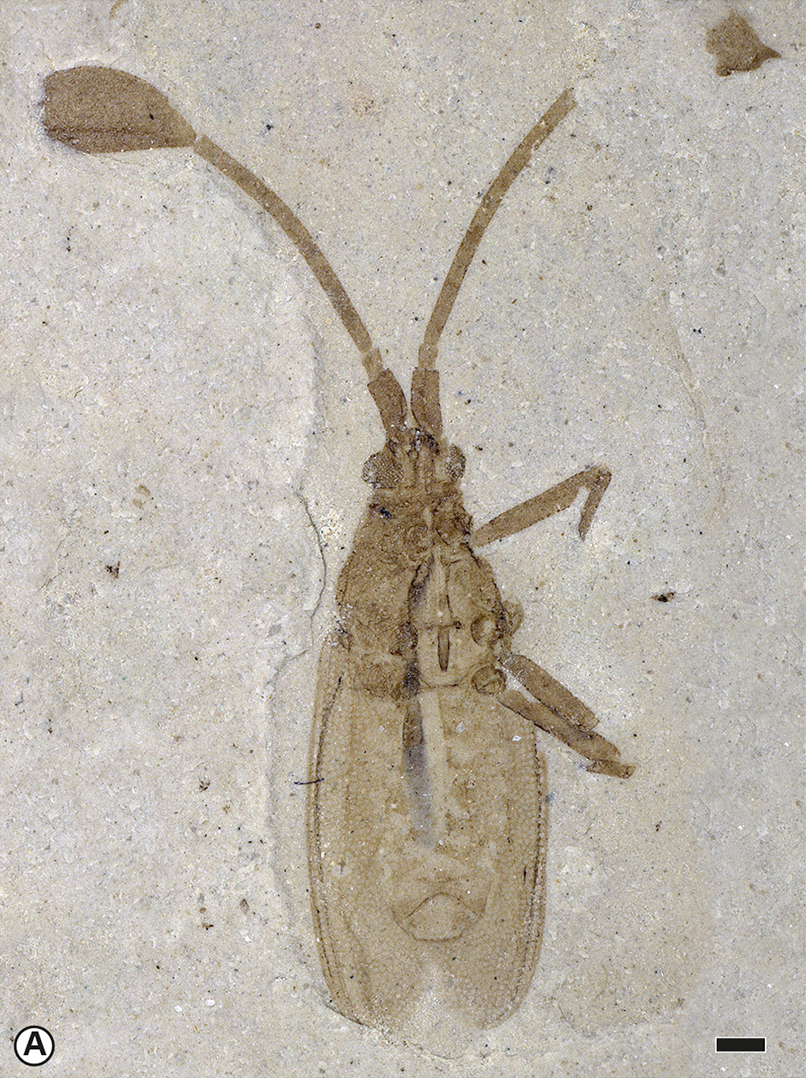
- G. kohlsi holotype

Scientific classification
- Kingdom: Animalia
- Phylum: Arthropoda
- Clade: Pancrustacea
- Class: Insecta
- Order: Hemiptera
- Suborder: Heteroptera
- Family: Tingidae
- Genus: †Gyaclavator
- Species: †G. kohlsi

Binomial name
- †Gyaclavator kohlsi Wappler, Guilbert, Wedmann, & Labandeira, 2015

= Gyaclavator =

Gyaclavator Temporal range: Latest Ypresian

Extinct genus of true bugs

Gyaclavator is an extinct genus of lace bug in the family Tingidae known from a fossil found in North America. The genus contains a single species, Gyaclavator kohlsi.

== History and classification ==
G. kohlsi was described from a group of fossils, which are compression-impression fossil pairs preserved in layers of soft sedimentary rock. Along with other well preserved insect fossils, the G. kohlsi specimens were collected from layers of the Late Early Eocene Parachute Creek Member of the Green River Formation. The formation is a group of Late Paleocene to Late Eocene depositional basins in Wyoming and Utah. The Parachute Creek Member is a composed of oil shales from the shallow mountain lake, Lake Uinta, that existed for around 20 million years. Study of the paleoflora preserved in the shales indicates the lake was around 1,500–2,900 metres (4,900–9,500 ft) in elevation surrounded by a tropical to subtropical environment that had a distinct dry season.

At the time of study, the holotype and paratype counterpart and parts were part of the paleoentomology collections housed by the National Museum of Natural History in Washington, D.C. They were first studied by an international team of researchers headed by Torsten Wappler of the Naturmuseum Senckenberg, Messel pit research station, Germany. The team's 2014 type description of the genus and species was published in the natural sciences journal PLOS ONE. The generic name is a combination of "Gyas", a Greek giant, and the Latin "clavator" meaning club. The name is a reference to the unique enlarged structuring of the antennae. The specific epithet kohlsi is a patronym coined in honor of David Kohls, for the support he has provided paleontology along with finding and donating the holotype fossil.

At the time of description, the total number of Tingidae species described from fossils in the United States was six, with Dictyla veterna, Eotingis antennata and Tingis florissantensis from the late Eocene Florissant Formation. Vianagramma goldmani and Vianathauna pericarti are both from the Turonian New Jersey amber. Of the four species described from Colorado as of 2015, G. kohlsi was the first described from the Green River Formation.

The structuring of the wings is very similar to extant species in the subfamily Cantacaderinae. However phylogenetic analysis gave results suggesting G. kohlsi is a possible sister taxon to the subfamily. If placed in the subfamily, the species would be the only record of the subfamily from the Nearctic region, though the subfamily is known from the Neotropic region, with a fossil species described from Dominican amber.

== Description ==
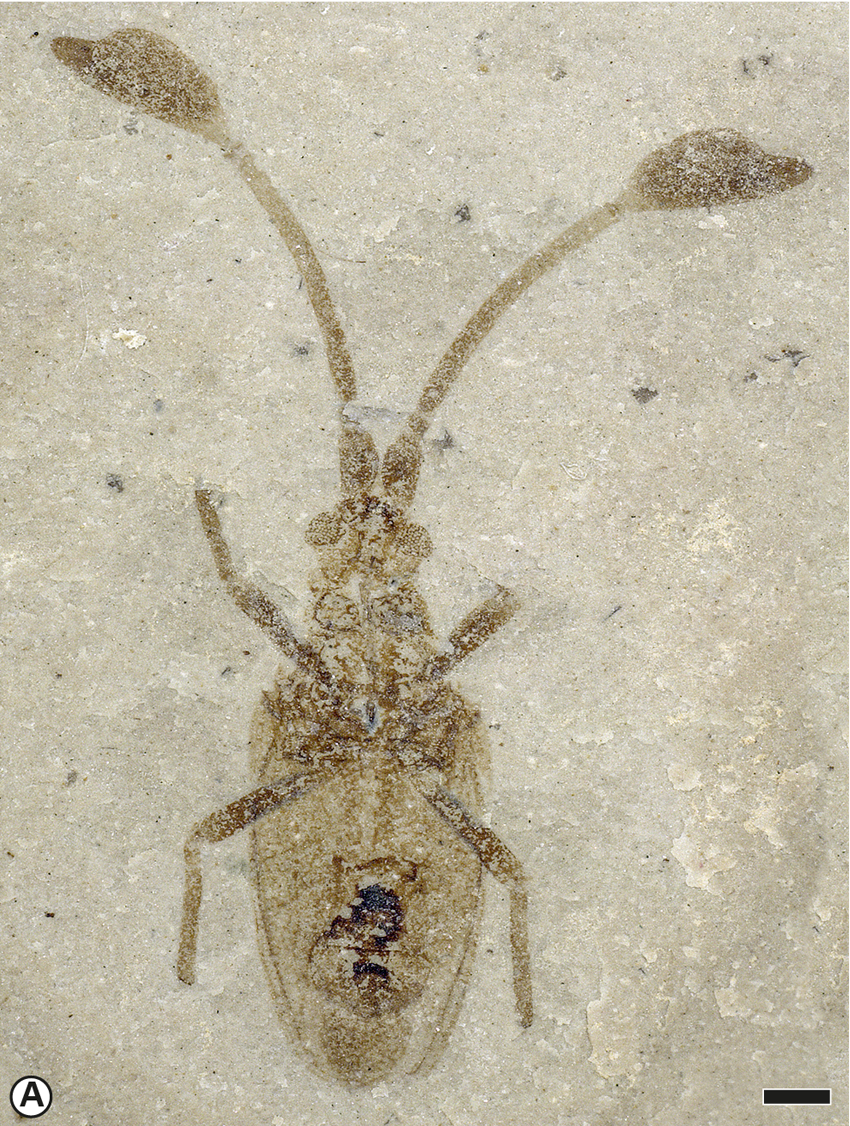
G. kohlsi paratype

The known G. kohlsi fossils are all males, preserved with whole bodies but missing portions of the legs or antennae. The holotype and two of the paratypes are preserved in ventral view while the fourth paratype is in dorsal preservation and missing the forward area and antennae. The holotype is 5.5 mm (0.22 in) from the ends of the hemelytra to the tip of the head. The three paratypes are 5.0 mm (0.20 in), 5.4 mm (0.21 in), and 5.0 mm (0.20 in) long respectively. In all the specimens the well developed hemelytra project past the tip of the abdomen and the bodies have an overall ovoid shape. The heads have a long rostrum, laying along the head and ending almost at the abdomen. The eyes are round and project from out from the sides of the head. There are three raised carinae which run along the pronotum. The antennae, which are as long as the head to the abdomen, are made up of four segments. Antennomere three is the longest and antennomere two is shortest. The final segment is flared into a petal form, with a ridge separating them into a wider side and a longer side.

Given the unique flaring of the distiflagellomere (the last segment of the antennae), it is possible the antennae were used in male to male competition displays, or in female courtship, though they may have only been used for sensory input. The species is the first known example of distinct visual display structuring in Tingidae antennae. Similar modification of antennae segments is seen in the leaf footed bug genera Chariesterus and Chondrocera who use them in aerial displays competing with nearby males to attract females.
