= Lebanoculicoides bloudani =

Lebanoculicoides bloudani Temporal range: Lower Cretaceous

Scientific classification
- Kingdom: Animalia
- Phylum: Arthropoda
- Clade: Pancrustacea
- Class: Insecta
- Order: Diptera
- Family: Ceratopogonidae
- Genus: †Lebanoculicoides
- Species: †L. bloudani

Binomial name
- †Lebanoculicoides bloudani Choufani et al., 2015

Extinct species of biting midge

Lebanoculicoides bloudani is an extinct species of biting midge found in Syria.

== Etymology ==
The specific epithet "bloudani" is derived from the type locality, Bloudan.
