= Zygadenia =

Zygadenia Temporal range: Sinemurian–Albian

Scientific classification
- Kingdom: Animalia
- Phylum: Arthropoda
- Clade: Pancrustacea
- Class: Insecta
- Order: Coleoptera
- Suborder: Archostemata
- Family: incertae sedis
- Genus: †Zygadenia; Handlirsch, 1906

Synonyms
- Kakoselia Handlirsch, 1906

Extinct genus of beetles

Zygadenia is an extinct genus of archostematan beetles from the Early Jurassic to Early Cretaceous. It is considered to be a senior synonym of Notocupes by Kirejtshuk (2020), but other researchers suggest to reserve the genus Zygadenia as a form taxon for isolated elytra that probably belong to the genus Notocupes, while retaining Notocupes as a valid genus for complete body fossils.

Eleven species are included in the genus, after Strelnikova and Yan (2021, 2023). Kirejtshuk (2020) notes that the two Lower Jurassic Australian species Z. westraliensis and Z. martinae possibly merit placement in their own separate genus.

== Jurassic species ==
=== Hettangian-Sinemurian (201.4 Ma to 192.9 Ma) ===
Xiaomeigou Formation, China (Note: These are body fossils treated as Zygadenia sensu lato following Kirejtshuk (2020), with Notocupes treated as a synonym.)

- Z. dachaidanensis Song et al., 2024
- Z. haixiensis Song et al., 2024

=== Sinemurian-Toarcian (199.5 Ma to 174.1 Ma) ===
Cattamarra Coal Measures, Australia

- Z. martinae Jarzembowski et al., 2015
- Z. westraliensis Riek, 1968

=== Tithonian (152.1 Ma to 145.0 Ma) ===
Shar Teeg, Mongolia

- Z. giebeli Ponomarenko, 2014
- Z. handlirschi Ponomarenko, 2014

== Cretaceous species ==
=== Berriasian (145.0 Ma to 139.8 Ma) ===
Lulworth Formation, United Kingdom

- Z. angliae (Giebel, 1856)
- Z. tuberculata (Giebel, 1856)

=== Hauterivian (132.9 Ma to 129.4 Ma) ===
Weald Clay, United Kingdom

- Z. angliae (Giebel 1856)
- Z. floodpagei Jarzembowski et al., 2015
- Z. simpsoni Jarzembowski et al., 2015

=== Barremian (129.4 Ma to 125.0 Ma) ===
Sinuiju Formation, North Korea

- Z. liui Jarzembowski et al., 2015

Weald Clay, United Kingdom

- Z. angliae (Giebel, 1856)
- Z. floodpagei Jarzembowski et al., 2015
- Z. tuberculata (Giebel, 1856)
- Z. simpsoni Jarzembowski et al., 2015

=== Aptian (125.0 to ~113.0 Ma) ===
Argun Formation, Russia

- Z. sinitzae Ponomarenko, 2000

Sinuiju Formation, North Korea

- Z. liui Jarzembowski et al., 2015

Yixian Formation, China

- Z. liui Jarzembowski et al., 2015

Zaza Formation, Buryatia, Russia

- Z. alexrasnitsyni Strelnikova & Yan, 2021

=== Albian (113.0 Ma to 100.5 Ma) ===
Jinju Formation, South Korea

- Z. cornigera Lee et al., 2023
