= Ichneutinae =

Scientific classification
- Domain: Eukaryota
- Kingdom: Animalia
- Phylum: Arthropoda
- Class: Insecta
- Order: Hymenoptera
- Family: Braconidae
- Subfamily: Ichneutinae; Foerster, 1863

Tribes
- Ichneutini; Muesebeckiini; Proteropini

Subfamily of wasps

The Ichneutinae are a subfamily of braconid parasitoid wasps.

== Description and distribution ==
Ichneutines are small to medium-sized, non-cyclostome braconids. They lack an occipital carina (ridge on the back of the head).

They have a cosmopolitan distribution.

== Biology ==
Ichneutines are all solitary, koinobionont parasitoids which oviposit into host eggs, but complete development once the host has become a larva. Members of the tribes Ichneutini and Proteropini attack sawfly larvae, especially in the families Argidae and Tenthredinidae. Members of Muesebeckiini target Lepidopteran leaf-miners.
