= Oviparosiphidae =

Scientific classification
- Kingdom: Animalia
- Phylum: Arthropoda
- Clade: Pancrustacea
- Class: Insecta
- Order: Hemiptera
- Suborder: Sternorrhyncha
- Superfamily: Aphidoidea
- Family: †Oviparosiphidae; Shaposhnikov, 1979

Extinct family of true bugs

Oviparosiphidae is an extinct insect family in the aphid superfamily (Aphidoidea), of the order Hemiptera.
