= Agastomyrma =

Agastomyrma Temporal range: Priabonian

Scientific classification
- Domain: Eukaryota
- Kingdom: Animalia
- Phylum: Arthropoda
- Class: Insecta
- Order: Hymenoptera
- Family: Formicidae
- Subfamily: Myrmicinae
- Tribe: incertae sedis
- Genus: †Agastomyrma; Dlussky, Rasnitsyn & Perfilieva, 2015
- Species: †A. laticeps

Binomial name
- †Agastomyrma laticeps Dlussky, Rasnitsyn & Perfilieva, 2015

Genus of ants

Agastomyrma is an extinct genus of formicid in the ant subfamily Myrmicinae known from the fossil species Agastomyrma laticeps found in eastern Asia.

== History and classification ==
A. laticeps is known from a single queen ant found in Russia. The specimen was described from a compression fossil preserved in diatomite deposits of the Bol’shaya Svetlovodnaya site. The site is exposed on the bank of Barachek Creek 3 km (1.9 mi) upstream from the creeks confluence with the Bol’shaya Svetlovodnaya River in the Pozharsky District, on the Pacific Coast of Russia. The fossil-bearing rocks preserve possibly Priabonian plants and animals which lived in and around a small lake near a volcano. The site has been attributed to either the Maksimovka or Salibez Formations and compared to the Bembridge Marls and Florissant Formation, both of which are Priabonian in age.

At the time of description, the part and counterpart holotype queen specimen, numbers PIN 3429/1178 and PIN 3429/1173, was preserved in the A. A. Borissiak Paleontological Institute collections, part of the Russian Academy of Sciences. The fossil was first described by the trio of paleomyrmecologists Gennady Dlussky, Alexandr Rasnitsyn and Ksenia Perfilieva. In the type description, Dlussky, Rasnitsyn and Perfilieva coined the genus name Agastomyrma from a combination of the Latin agastus which means "pleasing" and Greek Myrmica meaning "ant". The specific epithet is derived the Latin laticeps that translates to "with a wide head".

Agastomyrma is one of two extinct ant genera described by Dlussky et al from Bol’shaya Svetlovodnaya fossils in the 2015 paper. The other genus Biamomyrma is also a myrmicine, and differs from Agastomyrma in the structuring of the petiole and in the relative sizing of the queens head.

== Description ==
The A. laticeps queen is preserved as a dorsal compression showing the upper surface of the head, thorax and abdomen, without fore-wings or antennae. The body length as preserved is estimated at 4 mm (0.16 in), though portions of the head and the gaster are missing. A. laticeps is distinguished by the large size of the head relative to the body, the head being 0.9 mm (0.035 in) long while the mesosoma is 1.3 mm (0.051 in). The head has rounded back corners and a straight back edge.
