= Bajsaphididae =

Bajsaphididae Temporal range: 125.45–112.6 Ma

Scientific classification
- Kingdom: Animalia
- Phylum: Arthropoda
- Clade: Pancrustacea
- Class: Insecta
- Order: Hemiptera
- Suborder: Sternorrhyncha
- Superfamily: Aphidoidea
- Family: †Bajsaphididae; Homan, Zyla & Wegierek, 2015

Extinct family of true bugs

Bajsaphididae is an extinct insect family in the aphid superfamily (Aphidoidea), of the order Hemiptera.
