= Koshelevka =

Koshelevka Кошелевка
- Selo
- Location within Astrakhan Oblast Location within Russia
- Coordinates: 46°31′N 48°43′E
- Country: Russia
- Region: Astrakhan Oblast
- District: Krasnoyarsky District
- Time zone: UTC+4:00

Koshelevka (Russian: Кошелевка) is a rural locality (a selo) in Vatazhensky Selsoviet, Krasnoyarsky District, Astrakhan Oblast, Russia. The population was 118 as of 2010. There are 2 streets.

== Geography ==
Koshelevka is located 33 km east of Krasny Yar (the district's administrative centre) by road. Kotyayevka is the nearest rural locality.
