= Lebanoculicoides =

Lebanoculicoides Temporal range: Lower Cretaceous

Scientific classification
- Kingdom: Animalia
- Phylum: Arthropoda
- Clade: Pancrustacea
- Class: Insecta
- Order: Diptera
- Family: Ceratopogonidae
- Subfamily: †Lebanoculicoidinae; Borkent, 2000
- Genus: †Lebanoculicoides; Szadziewski, 1996

Type species
- †Lebanoculicoides mesozoicus Szadziewski, 1996

Genus of insects

Lebanoculicoides is an extinct genus of biting midges found in Lebanon, Spain and Syria. It is the only genus in the subfamily Lebanoculicoidinae. It is thought to be the most basal member of the family.

== Species ==
The following four species are included as of 2020

- Lebanoculicoides bloudani Choufani et al., 2015
- Lebanoculicoides daheri Choufani, Azar & Nel, 2015
- Lebanoculicoides excantabris Pérez-de la Fuente et al., 2011
- Lebanoculicoides mesozoicus Szadziewski, 1996
