= Olisthaerinae =

Scientific classification
- Kingdom: Animalia
- Phylum: Arthropoda
- Clade: Pancrustacea
- Class: Insecta
- Order: Coleoptera
- Suborder: Polyphaga
- Infraorder: Staphyliniformia
- Family: Staphylinidae
- Subfamily: Olisthaerinae; Thomson, 1858

Type genus
- Olisthaerus Dejan, 1833

Subfamily of beetles

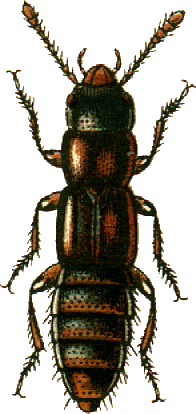
Olisthaerus megacephalus

The Olisthaerinae are a subfamily of the Staphylinidae. They are similar to the Phloeocharinae. Their habitat is under the bark of dead conifers. Their biology is poorly known. The tarsal formula is 5–5–5. In North America, two species, Olisthaerus megacephalus (Zetterstedt) and O. substriatus (Gyllenhal) are known, from Alaska across Canada to New York.
