= Yixianteres =

Yixianteres Temporal range: Early Cretaceous

Scientific classification
- Kingdom: Animalia
- Phylum: Arthropoda
- Clade: Pancrustacea
- Class: Insecta
- Order: Coleoptera
- Suborder: Polyphaga
- Infraorder: Cucujiformia
- Family: Trogossitidae
- Genus: †Yixianteres; Yu et al., 2015
- Species: †Y. beipiaoensis

Binomial name
- †Yixianteres beipiaoensis Yu et al., 2015

Extinct genus of beetle

Yixianteres is an extinct genus of lophocaterine beetle found in China during the Early Cretaceous epoch. It is a monotypic genus known from the species Y. beipiaoensis.
