= Paridris =

Scientific classification
- Kingdom: Animalia
- Phylum: Arthropoda
- Clade: Pancrustacea
- Class: Insecta
- Order: Hymenoptera
- Family: Platygastridae
- Genus: Paridris; Kieffer, 1908

Genus of wasps

Paridris is a genus of wasps belonging to the family Platygastridae.

The species of this genus are found in America, Africa, and Southeastern Asia.

== Species ==
Species:

- Paridris aeneus (Ashmead, 1894)
- Paridris anikulapo Talamas, 2013
- Paridris armatus Talamas, 2012
- Paridrus bispinosa (Masner, 1958)
- Paridris bunun Talamas, 2011
