= Lomovatka =

Lomovatka Ломоватка
- Settlement
- Location within Vologda Oblast Location within Russia
- Coordinates: 61°07′N 45°31′E
- Country: Russia
- Region: Vologda Oblast
- District: Velikoustyugsky District
- Time zone: UTC+3:00

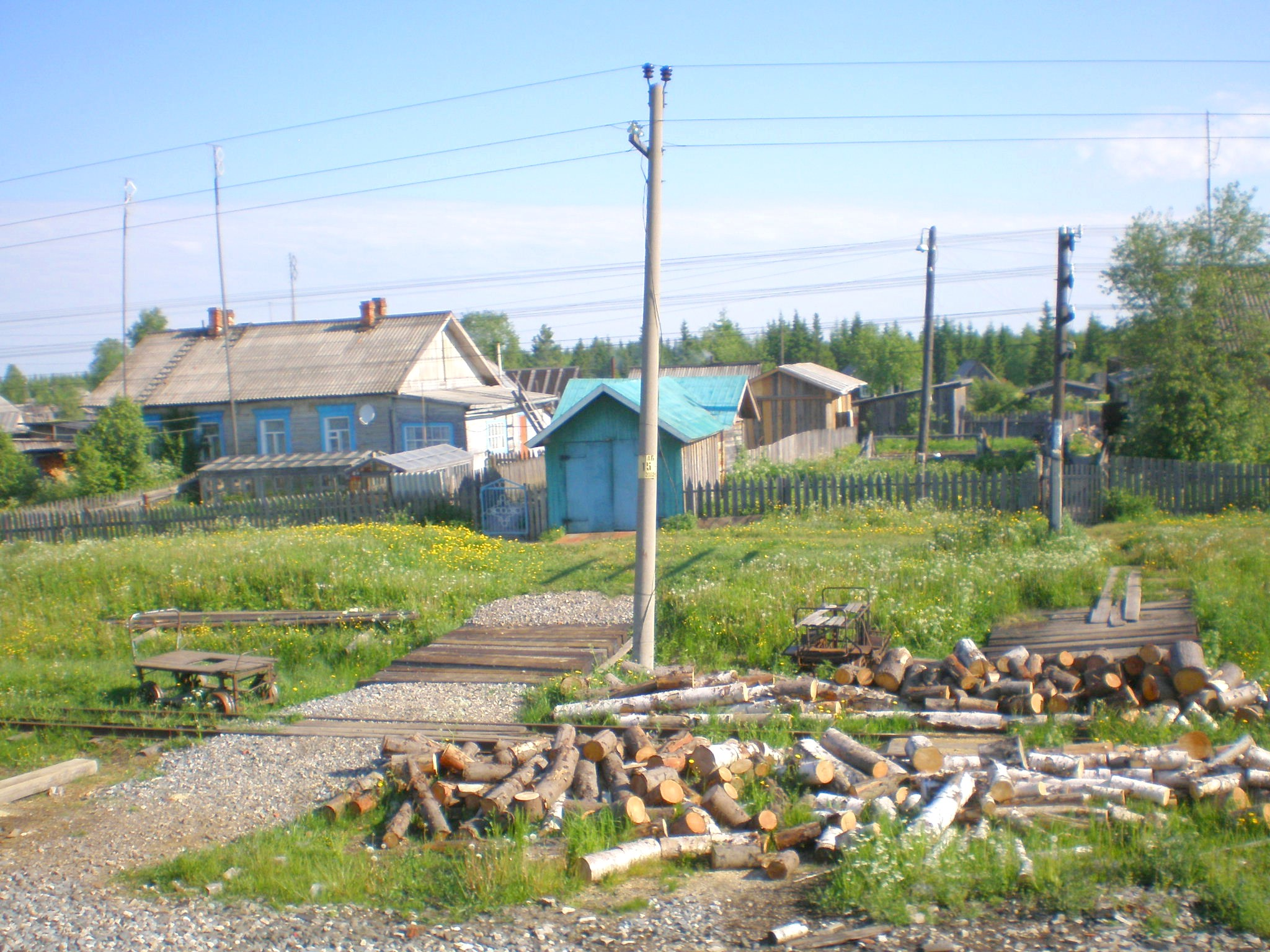
Lomovatka in 2008

Lomovatka (Russian: Ломоватка) is a rural locality (a settlement) in and the administrative center of Lomatovskoye Rural Settlement, Velikoustyugsky District, Vologda Oblast, Russia. The population was 1,513 as of 2002. There are 18 streets.

== Geography ==
Lomovatka is located 107 km northwest of Veliky Ustyug (the district's administrative centre) by road. Pikhtovo is the nearest rural locality.
