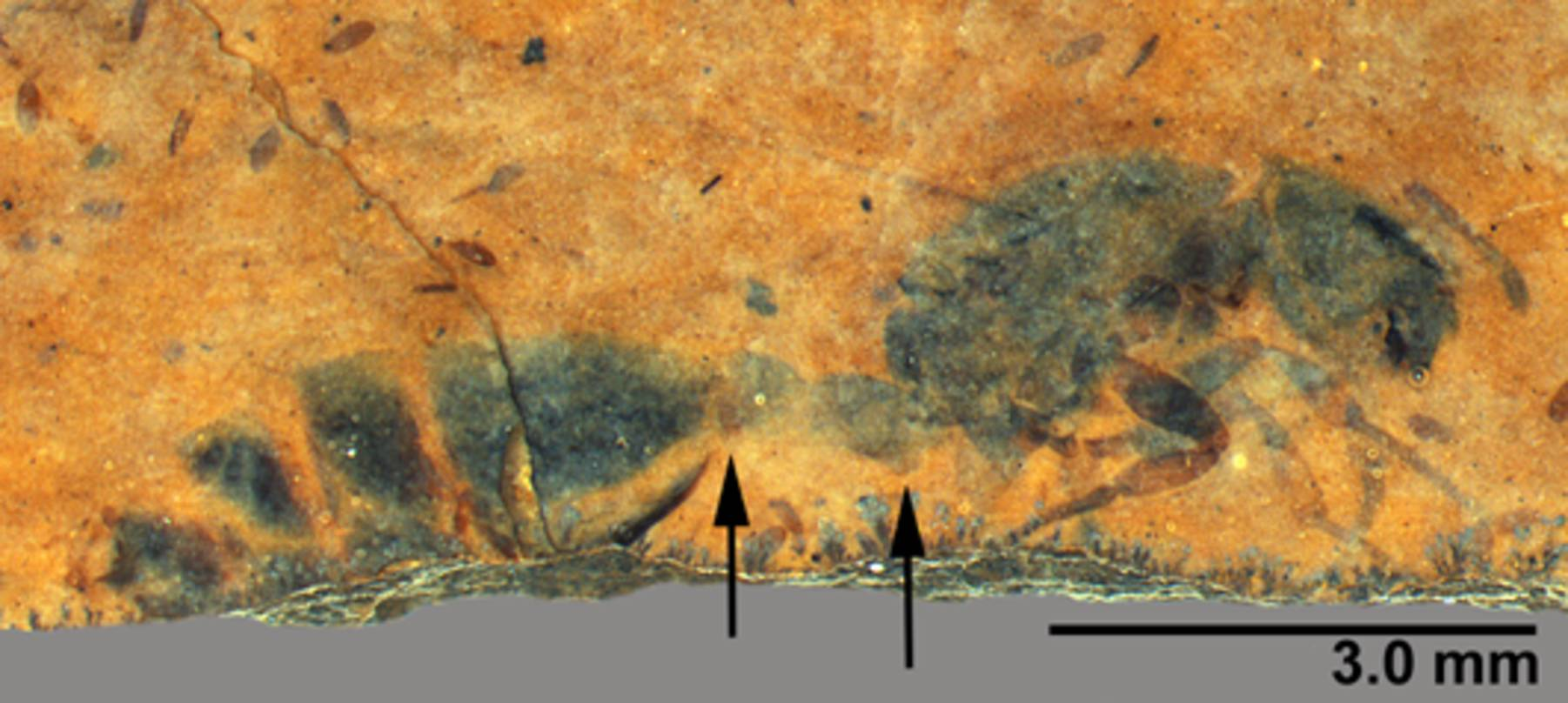
- The Crematogaster aurora queen ant

Scientific classification
- Kingdom: Animalia
- Phylum: Arthropoda
- Clade: Pancrustacea
- Class: Insecta
- Order: Hymenoptera
- Family: Formicidae
- Subfamily: Myrmicinae
- Genus: Crematogaster
- Species: †C. aurora

Binomial name
- †Crematogaster aurora LaPolla & Greenwalt, 2015

= Crematogaster aurora =

Extinct species of ant

Crematogaster aurora is a valid species of myrmicine ant that lived in Baltic Europe about 46 million to 43 million years ago during the Cenozoic era Eocene epoch. C. aurora has a similar look to the ant genus Acanthomyrmex and shares some similarities with the ant genus Pristomyrmex. The fossil found of C. aurora is of a queen ant that is brown in coloration. It probably died by drowning in a lake approximately 46 million years ago.
