= Ellinaphididae =

Scientific classification
- Domain: Eukaryota
- Kingdom: Animalia
- Phylum: Arthropoda
- Class: Insecta
- Order: Hemiptera
- Suborder: Sternorrhyncha
- Infraorder: Aphidomorpha
- Superfamily: †Palaeoaphidoidea
- Family: †Ellinaphididae; Kania & Wegierek, 2008

Extinct family of true bugs

Ellinaphididae is an extinct family of aphids in the order Hemiptera. There are about 13 genera and more than 40 described species in Ellinaphididae.

Palaeoaphididae is sometimes considered a subfamily (Palaeoaphidinae) of Palaeoaphididae.

== Genera ==
These 13 genera belong to the family Ellinaphididae:

- † Annulaphis Shaposhnikov, 1979
- † Bugyrorinaphis Kania & Wegierek, 2008
- † Buriataphis Kania & Wegierek, 2008
- † Caudaphis Zhang, Zhang, Hou & Ma, 1989
- † Ellinaphis Shaposhnikov, 1979
- † Mongoaphis Kania & Wegierek, 2013
- † Rallotopaphis Kania & Wegierek, 2008
- † Rinorectuaphis Kania & Wegierek, 2008
- † Secusellinaphis Zyla & Wegierek, 2015
- † Transbaikalis Kania & Wegierek, 2008
- † Tsagaanaphis Kania & Wegierek, 2013
- † Unioaphis Kania & Wegierek, 2008
- † Vetellinaphis Zyla & Wegierek, 2015
