= 2023 in paleoentomology =

This list of 2023 in paleoentomology records new fossil insect taxa that were described during the year, as well as documents significant paleoentomology discoveries and events which occurred during that year.

== Clade Amphiesmenoptera ==
=== Lepidopterans ===
==== New lepidopteran taxa ====
Name	Novelty	Status	Authors	Age	Type locality	Location	Notes	Images
Neptis kabutoiwaensis	Sp. nov	In press	Aiba, Takahashi & Sakamaki	Pliocene	Motojuku Group	Japan	A species of Neptis.	
Penestola wichardi	Sp. nov	Valid	Solis, Léger & Neumann	Miocene	Dominican amber	Dominican Republic	A species of Penestola.	

==== Lepidopteran research ====
- Heikkilä et al. (2023) revise purported bombycoid fossil record, reporting that the earliest fossil material that can be assigned to the superfamily with certainty dates to the middle Miocene, while the majority of purported fossil bombycoids lack definitive bombycoid characters.

=== Trichopterans ===
==== New trichopteran taxa ====
Name	Novelty	Status	Authors	Age	Type locality	Location	Notes	Images
Archiphilopotamus expectatus	Sp. nov	Valid	Sukatsheva & Sinitshenkova	Late Jurassic	Karabastau Formation	Kazakhstan	A member of the family Philopotamidae.	
Burmapsyche wolframmeyi	Sp. nov	Valid	Wichard & Kuranishi	Late Cretaceous (Cenomanian)	Burmese amber	Myanmar	A member of Sericostomatoidea belonging to the family Burmapsychidae.	
Cladochorista curta	Sp. nov	Valid	Sukatsheva & Sinitshenkova	Middle–Late Triassic	Madygen Formation	Kyrgyzstan	A member of the family Cladochoristidae.	
Cladochorista sola	Sp. nov	Valid	Sukatsheva & Sinitshenkova	Middle–Late Triassic	Madygen Formation	Kyrgyzstan	A member of the family Cladochoristidae.	
Juraphilopotamus inopinatus	Sp. nov	Valid	Sukatsheva & Sinitshenkova	Late Jurassic	Karabastau Formation	Kazakhstan	A member of the family Philopotamidae.	
Juraphilopotamus similis	Sp. nov	Valid	Sukatsheva & Sinitshenkova	Middle Jurassic	Itat Formation	Russia (Krasnoyarsk Krai)	A member of the family Philopotamidae.	
Paduniella cretacea	Sp. nov	Valid	Wichard	Late Cretaceous (Cenomanian)	Burmese amber	Myanmar	A member of the family Psychomyiidae.	
Palerasnitsynus vilarinoi	Sp. nov	Valid	Wichard	Late Cretaceous (Cenomanian)	Burmese amber	Myanmar	A member of the family Xiphocentronidae.	
Palleptocerus kuranishii	Sp. nov	Valid	Wichard	Late Cretaceous (Cenomanian)	Burmese amber	Myanmar	A member of Leptoceroidea belonging to the family Palleptoceridae.	
Plectrocnemia aristovi	Sp. nov	Valid	Melnitsky & Ivanov	Eocene	Rovno amber	Ukraine	A species of Plectrocnemia.	
Plectrocnemia zolotuhini	Sp. nov	Valid	Melnitsky & Ivanov	Eocene	Rovno amber	Ukraine	A species of Plectrocnemia.	
Prorhyacophila batkenica	Sp. nov	Valid	Sukatsheva & Sinitshenkova	Middle–Late Triassic	Madygen Formation	Kyrgyzstan	A member of the family Prorhyacophilidae.	
Prorhyacophila rara	Sp. nov	Valid	Sukatsheva & Sinitshenkova	Middle–Late Triassic	Madygen Formation	Kyrgyzstan	A member of the family Prorhyacophilidae.	
Sukatshevabaga	Nom. nov	Valid	Tian & Zhang	Jurassic		Mongolia	A member of the family Philopotamidae; a replacement name for Baga Sukatsheva (1992).	

==== Trichopteran research ====
- Baranov et al. (2023) describe leptocerid and lepidostomatid larvae from the Eocene Baltic amber, two of which still bear their cases, and interpret this finding as indicating that at least some aquatic larvae from Baltic amber were trapped in resin flows within the water bodies.

=== Other amphiesmenopterans ===
Name	Novelty	Status	Authors	Age	Type locality	Location	Notes	Images
Kamopanorpa aristovi	Sp. nov	Valid	Sukatsheva & Sinitshenkova	Permian		Russia (Udmurtia)	A member of the (stem-trichopteran or stem-amphiesmenopteran) family Microptysmatidae.	
Karataulius martae	Sp. nov	Valid	Sukatsheva & Sinitshenkova	Late Jurassic	Karabastau Formation	Kazakhstan	A member of the (trichopteran or basal amphiesmenopteran) family Necrotauliidae.	
Kinitocelis patrickmuelleri	Sp. nov	Valid	Mey & Wichard	Late Cretaceous (Cenomanian)	Burmese amber	Myanmar	A tarachopteran.	
Necrotaulius communis	Sp. nov	Valid	Sukatsheva & Sinitshenkova	Middle Jurassic	Itat Formation	Russia (Krasnoyarsk Krai)	A member of the family Necrotauliidae.	
Tarachocelis emmarossae	Sp. nov	Valid	Mey & Wichard	Late Cretaceous (Cenomanian)	Burmese amber	Myanmar	A tarachopteran.	

== Clade Antliophora ==
=== Dipterans ===
==== Brachycerans ====
Name	Novelty	Status	Authors	Age	Type locality	Location	Notes	Images
Christelenka	Fam. et gen. et sp. nov	Valid	Roháček in Roháček, Hammel & Baranov	Eocene	Baltic amber	Russia (Kaliningrad Oblast)	A member of Acalyptratae, Type genus of the family Christelenkidae. The type species is C. multiplex.	
Cyphomyia mexicana	Sp. nov	Valid	Poinar & Fachin	Miocene	Mexican amber	Mexico	A species of Cyphomyia.	
Electrochoreutes	Gen. et 7 sp. nov	Valid	Badano et al.	Late Cretaceous (Cenomanian)	Burmese amber	Myanmar	A stem group long-legged fly. The type species is E. trisetigerus; genus also includes E. electroechinus, E. falculigerus, E. furcillatus, E. hamatus, E. pankowskii and E. planitibia .	
Eornithoica	Gen. et sp. nov	Valid	Nel, Garrouste & Engel	Eocene (Ypresian)	Green River Formation	United States (Colorado)	A member of Hippoboscidae. The type species is E. grimaldii.	Eornithoica grimaldii
Grimaldipeza	Gen. et sp. nov	Valid	Solórzano-Kraemer et al.	Cretaceous (Albian)	El Soplao amber	Spain	A Hybotid dance fly. The type species is G. coelica.	
Hemilauxania parvula	Sp. nov	Valid	Roháček & Hoffeins	Eocene (Ypresian)	Oise amber	France	A lauxaniid fly.	
Medeterites atterraneus	Comb. nov		(Nazarov)	Eocene	Baltic amber	Europe (Baltic Sea region)	A species of Medeterites. Moved from Anepsiomyia atterraneus Nazarov (1994).	
Medeterites gestuosus	Comb. nov		(Meunier)	Eocene	Baltic amber	Europe (Baltic Sea region)	A species of Medeterites. Moved from Thrypticus gestuosus Meunier (1907).	
Medeterites gulosus	Comb. nov		(Meunier)	Eocene	Baltic amber	Europe (Baltic Sea region)	A species of Medeterites. Moved from Thrypticus gulosus Meunier (1907).	
Medeterites latipennis	Comb. nov		(Meunier)	Eocene	Baltic amber	Europe (Baltic Sea region)	A species of Medeterites. Moved from Achalcus latipennis Meunier (1907).	
Palaeoargyra planipedia	Comb. nov		(Meunier)	Eocene	Baltic amber	Europe (Baltic Sea region)	A species of Palaeoargyra. Moved from Anepsius planipedius Meunier (1907).	
Palaeomedeterus concinnus	Comb. nov		(Meunier)	Eocene	Baltic amber	Europe (Baltic Sea region)	A species of Palaeomedeterus. Moved from Chrysotus concinnus Meunier (1907).	
Palaeomedeterus praeconcinnus	Comb. nov		(Evenhuis)	Eocene	Baltic amber	Europe (Baltic Sea region)	A species of Palaeomedeterus. Moved from Chrysotus praeconcinnus Evenhuis (1994).	
Palaeomedeterus tertiarius	Comb. nov		(Meunier)	Eocene	Baltic amber	Europe (Baltic Sea region)	A species of Palaeomedeterus. Moved from Diaphorus tertiarius Meunier (1907).	
Plesiomedetera	Gen. et comb. nov		Grichanov	Eocene	Baltic amber	Europe (Baltic Sea region)	A long-legged fly. Genus includes P. flammea, P. decora, P. elegantula, P. lasciva, P. lepida, P. mustela, & P. vana (all 1907). Published online in 2024, but the issue date is listed as December 2023.	
Prohercostomus ciliatus	Comb. nov		(Meunier)	Eocene	Baltic amber	Europe (Baltic Sea region)	A species of Prohercostomus. Moved from Systenus ciliatus Meunier (1907).	
Prohercostomus devinctus	Comb. nov		(Meunier)	Eocene	Baltic amber	Europe (Baltic Sea region)	A species of Prohercostomus. Moved from Gymnopternus devinctus Meunier (1907).	
Prohercostomus gracilis	Comb. nov		(Meunier)	Eocene	Baltic amber	Europe (Baltic Sea region)	A species of Prohercostomus. Moved from Campsicnemus gracilis Meunier (1907).	
Prohercostomus inumbratus	Comb. nov		(Meunier)	Eocene	Baltic amber	Europe (Baltic Sea region)	A species of Prohercostomus. Moved from Gymnopternus inumbratus Meunier (1907).	
Prohercostomus minutus	Comb. nov		(Meunier)	Eocene	Baltic amber	Europe (Baltic Sea region)	A species of Prohercostomus. Moved from Hygroceleuthus minutus Meunier (1907).	
Prohercostomus morbosus	Comb. nov		(Meunier)	Eocene	Baltic amber	Europe (Baltic Sea region)	A species of Prohercostomus. Moved from Dolichopus morbosus Meunier (1907).	
Symphoromyia odileae	Sp. nov	Valid	Peyrot, Ngô-Muller & Nel	Eocene	Baltic amber	Europe (Baltic Sea region)	A species of Symphoromyia.	

==== Nematocerans ====
Name	Novelty	Status	Authors	Age	Type locality	Location	Notes	Images
Baskintoconops	Gen. et sp. nov	Valid	Pielowska-Ceranowska in Pielowska-Ceranowska, Azar & Szwedo	Early Cretaceous (Barremian)	Lebanese amber	Lebanon	A member of the family Ceratopogonidae belonging to the subfamily Leptoconopinae. The type species is B. maaloufi.	
Cretobibio burmiticus	Sp. nov	Valid	Skartveit	Cretaceous	Burmese amber	Myanmar	A member of the family Bibionidae belonging to the subfamily Cretobibioninae.	
Eomicromimus	Gen. et 2 sp. nov	Valid	Giłka, Zakrzewska & Andersen	Eocene	Baltic amber	Poland	A member of the family Chironomidae belonging to the subfamily Chironominae and the tribe Pseudochironomini. The type species is E. polliciformis; genus also includes E. serpens.	
Eoriethia	Gen. et sp. nov	Valid	Giłka, Zakrzewska & Andersen	Eocene	Baltic amber	Poland	A member of the family Chironomidae belonging to the subfamily Chironominae and the tribe Pseudochironomini. The type species is E. ursipes.	
Leptotarsus reyi	Sp. nov	Valid	Azar & Nel	Early Cretaceous (Barremian)		Lebanon	A species of Leptotarsus.	
Libanoculex	Gen. et sp. nov	Valid	Azar et al.	Early Cretaceous (Barremian)	Lebanese amber	Lebanon	Originally described as a mosquito; argued to be a member of the family Chaoboridae by Harbach (2024). The type species is L. intermedius.	
Palaeoglaesum angustum	Sp. nov	Valid	Skibińska & Santos	Late Cretaceous (Cenomanian)	Burmese amber	Myanmar	A member of the family Psychodidae belonging to the subfamily Bruchomyiinae.	
Palaeoglaesum cracoviae	Sp. nov	Valid	Skibińska & Santos	Late Cretaceous (Cenomanian)	Burmese amber	Myanmar	A member of the family Psychodidae belonging to the subfamily Bruchomyiinae.	
Palaeoglaesum gregi	Sp. nov		Skibińska & Krzemiński in Skibińska et al.	Cretaceous	Burmese amber	Myanmar	A member of the family Psychodidae belonging to the subfamily Bruchomyiinae.	
Palaeoglaesum jakubi	Sp. nov		Skibińska et al.	Cretaceous	Burmese amber	Myanmar	A member of the family Psychodidae belonging to the subfamily Bruchomyiinae.	
Palaeoglaesum myanmari	Sp. nov		Skibińska et al.	Cretaceous	Burmese amber	Myanmar	A member of the family Psychodidae belonging to the subfamily Bruchomyiinae.	
Protodilophus	Gen. et sp. nov	Valid	Skartveit	Cretaceous	Burmese amber	Myanmar	A member of the family Bibionidae belonging to the subfamily Bibioninae. The type species is P. semispinosus.	
Rhabdomastix hoffeinsi	Sp. nov	Valid	Jordan-Stasiło et al.	Eocene	Baltic amber	Europe (Baltic Sea region)	A species of Rhabdomastix.	
Tipunia completa	Sp. nov		Kopeć et al.	Late Jurassic		Kazakhstan	A member of the family Tipulidae.	
Tipunia kania	Sp. nov		Kopeć et al.	Early Cretaceous		United Kingdom	A member of the family Tipulidae.	
Trichomyia vetusta	Sp. nov		Araújo & Gomes	Miocene	Mexican amber	Mexico	A species of Trichomyia.	
Trichoneura burmitensis	Sp. nov	Valid	Kopeć et al.	Late Cretaceous (Cenomanian)	Burmese amber	Myanmar	A species of Trichoneura.	
Trichoneura chungkuni	Sp. nov	Valid	Kopeć et al.	Late Cretaceous (Cenomanian)	Burmese amber	Myanmar	A species of Trichoneura.	
Trichoneura sevciki	Sp. nov	Valid	Kopeć et al.	Late Cretaceous (Cenomanian)	Burmese amber	Myanmar	A species of Trichoneura.	
Trichoneura wangi	Sp. nov	Valid	Kopeć et al.	Late Cretaceous (Cenomanian)	Burmese amber	Myanmar	A species of Trichoneura.	
Vogerhyphus	Gen. et comb. et sp. nov	Valid	Lukashevich & Mostovski	Middle Triassic (Anisian)	Grès à Voltzia	France	A member of Bibionomorpha belonging to the family Protorhyphidae. The type species is "Vymrhyphus" blagoderovi Krzemiński & Krzemińska (2003); genus also includes new species V. krzeminskorum.	

==== Dipteran research ====
- New fossil material of stratiomyomorphan larvae from the Cretaceous Myanmar amber is reported by Amaral et al. (2023), who interpret the studied fossils as indicating that members of Stratiomyomorpha were not rare, but in fact were common in the Myanmar amber.
- Fossil material of a member of the genus Bibio, representing the oldest record of the genus reported to date, is described from the Paleocene Menat Basin (France) by Nel & Kundura (2023).

=== Mecopterans ===
Name	Novelty	Status	Authors	Age	Type locality	Location	Notes	Images
Antiquanabittacus dispar	Sp. nov		Bashkuev	Early Cretaceous		Russia (Buryatia)	A hangingfly.	
Antiquanabittacus robustus	Sp. nov		Bashkuev	Early Cretaceous		Russia (Buryatia)	A hangingfly.	
Antiquanabittacus saltator	Sp. nov		Bashkuev	Early Cretaceous		Russia (Buryatia)	A hangingfly.	
Bittacus? paskapooensis	Sp. nov	Valid	Jouault et al.	Paleocene	Paskapoo Formation	Canada (Alberta)	A hangingfly.	
Jurathauma xinjiangensis	Sp. nov		Wang et al.	Early Jurassic	Badaowan Formation	China	A member of the family Eomeropidae.	
Paekthobittacus	Gen. et sp. nov		Ri et al.	Early Cretaceous (Barremian–Aptian)	Sinuiju Formation	North Korea	A hangingfly. The type species is P. sinuijuensis.	
Permoagetopanorpa	Gen. et 2 sp. nov	Valid	Lian, Cai & Huang	Permian (Capitanian)	Yinping Formation	China	A sinoagetopanorpid mecopteran. The type species is P. yinpingensis; genus also includes P. incompleta.	
Raragetopanorpa	Gen. et sp. nov	Valid	Lian, Cai & Huang	Permian (Capitanian)	Yinping Formation	China	A sinoagetopanorpid mecopteran. The type species is R. zhangi.	
Sinoagetopanorpa elegans	Sp. nov	Valid	Lian, Cai & Huang	Permian (Capitanian)	Yinping Formation	China	A sinoagetopanorpid mecopteran.	
Sinoagetopanorpa grimaldii	Sp. nov	Valid	Lian, Cai & Huang	Permian (Capitanian)	Yinping Formation	China	A sinoagetopanorpid mecopteran.	
Sinoagetopanorpa lini	Sp. nov	Valid	Lian, Cai & Huang	Permian (Capitanian)	Yinping Formation	China	A sinoagetopanorpid mecopteran.	
Sinoagetopanorpa magna	Sp. nov	Valid	Lian, Cai & Huang	Permian (Capitanian)	Yinping Formation	China	A sinoagetopanorpid mecopteran.	
Sinoagetopanorpa minuta	Sp. nov	Valid	Lian, Cai & Huang	Permian (Capitanian)	Yinping Formation	China	A sinoagetopanorpid mecopteran.	
Sinoagetopanorpa nigra	Sp. nov	Valid	Lian, Cai & Huang	Permian (Capitanian)	Yinping Formation	China	A sinoagetopanorpid mecopteran.	
Sinoagetopanorpa rotunda	Sp. nov	Valid	Lian, Cai & Huang	Permian (Capitanian)	Yinping Formation	China	A sinoagetopanorpid mecopteran.	
Sinoparachorista	Gen. et sp. nov		Lian, Cai & Huang	Middle Triassic		China	A parachoristid mecopteran. The type species is S. rara.	
Thaumatomerope sinensis	Sp. nov	Valid	Lian & Huang in Lian et al.	Middle Triassic (Ladinian)	Yanchang Formation	China	A member of the family Thaumatomeropidae.	
?Typhothauma agari	Sp. nov	Valid	Bashkuev & Jarzembowski	Early Cretaceous (Barremian)	Weald Clay Formation	United Kingdom	An eomeropid mecopteran.	
Virgulaparachorista	Gen. et 2 sp. nov		Lian, Cai & Huang	Middle Triassic		China	A parachoristid mecopteran. The genus includes V. tongchuanensis and V. elegans.	

== Clade Archaeorthoptera ==
=== Orthopterans ===
==== New orthopteran taxa ====
Name	Novelty	Status	Authors	Age	Type locality	Country	Notes	Images
Archaicaripipteryx burmensis	Sp. nov	Valid	Zhu et al.	Cretaceous	Burmese amber	Myanmar	A member of the family Ripipterygidae.	
Arethaea solterae	Sp. nov	Valid	Heads, Thomas & Hedlund in Heads et al.	Eocene	Green River Formation	United States (Colorado)	A species of Arethaea.	
Burmadactylus tenuicerci	Sp. nov	Valid	Fan, Gu & Cao	Late Cretaceous (Cenomanian)	Burmese amber	Myanmar	A member of the family Tridactylidae belonging to the subfamily Dentridactylinae.	
Burmecaelinus	Fam. et gen. et sp. nov	Valid	Uchida, Husemann & Kotthoff	Late Cretaceous (Cenomanian)	Burmese amber	Myanmar	A member of Caelifera, the type genus of the new family Burmecaelidae. The type species is B. armis.	
Chunxiania fascia	Sp. nov	Disputed	Gu et al.	Cretaceous	Burmese amber	Myanmar	Considered to be a junior synonym of Chunxiania fania by Cadena-Castañeda et al. (2024).	
Crassicorpus	Gen. et sp. nov		Zheng et al.	Cretaceous	Burmese amber	Myanmar	A tree cricket. The type species is C. maculatus.	
Daniilacheta	Gen. et sp. nov	Valid	Gorochov & Coram	Late Triassic-Early Jurassic		United Kingdom	A member of the family Protogryllidae. The type species is D. aristovi.	
Latedactylus	Gen. et sp. nov	Valid	Zheng, Cao & Gu	Cretaceous	Burmese amber	Myanmar	A member of the family Tridactylidae belonging to the subfamily Tridactylinae. The type species is L. longapedi.	
Letoelcana	Gen. et sp. nov		Schall, Kotthoff & Husemann	Cretaceous	Burmese amber	Myanmar	A member of the family Elcanidae. The type species is L. artemisapollonque.	
Ordicalcaratus	Gen. et sp. nov		Zheng et al.	Cretaceous	Burmese amber	Myanmar	A tree cricket. The type species is O. inconditus.	
Palaeonemobius	Gen. et sp. nov	Valid	Laurent & Desutter-Grandcolas in Desutter-Grandcolas et al.	Late Cretaceous (Cenomanian)		France	A member of the family Trigonidiidae belonging to the subfamily Nemobiinae. The type species is P. occidentalis.	
Parahagla cheni	Sp. nov	In press	Xu et al.	Early Jurassic	Badaowan Formation	China	A member of the family Prophalangopsidae belonging to the subfamily Chifengiinae.	
Paraxelcana	Gen. et sp. nov		Schall, Kotthoff & Husemann	Cretaceous	Burmese amber	Myanmar	A member of the family Elcanidae. The type species is P. coronakanthodis.	
Petilus	Gen. et sp. nov	Disputed	Gu et al.	Cretaceous	Burmese amber	Myanmar	The type species is P. zhengi Originally described as a member of Pseudogryllotalpidae subsequently assigned to the family Gryllidae by Cadena-Castañeda et al. (2024), who considered P. zhengi to be a junior synonym of Pherodactylus micromorphus.	
Pherodactylus rectanguli	Comb. nov	Valid	(Xu, Fang & Wang)	Cretaceous	Burmese amber	Myanmar	Moved from Tresdigitus rectanguli Xu, Fang & Wang (2020). Originally described as a mole cricket, but Cadena-Castañeda et al. (2023) considered it to be a member of the family Gryllidae.	
Picogryllus	Gen. et sp. nov	Valid	Josse & Desutter-Grandcolas in Desutter-Grandcolas et al.	Cretaceous (Albian or Cenomanian)		France	A cricket belonging to the subfamily Podoscirtinae. The type species is P. carentonensis.	
Plesioschwinzia sharovi	Sp. nov	Valid	Gorochov & Coram	Late Triassic-Early Jurassic		United Kingdom	A member of the family Locustopsidae.	
Probaisselcana oculata	Sp. nov		Hu & He	Cretaceous	Burmese amber	Myanmar	A member of the family Elcanidae. Subsequently transferred to the genus Pseudoprobaisselcana by Willmott et al. (2025).	
Pseudogryllotalpa	Fam. et gen. et sp. nov	Disputed	Gu et al.	Cretaceous	Burmese amber	Myanmar	The type species is P. scalprata. Originally described as a member of Ensifera and the type genus of the new family Pseudogryllotalpidae; subsequently assigned to the family Gryllidae by Cadena-Castañeda et al. (2024), who considered P. scalprata to be a junior synonym of Pherodactylus micromorphus.	
Qiongqi	Gen. et sp. nov	Valid	Yuan, Ma & Gu	Cretaceous	Burmese amber	Myanmar	A member of the family Trigonidiidae. The type species is Q. crinalis.	
Trigonelca	Gen. et sp. nov		Schall, Kotthoff & Husemann	Cretaceous	Burmese amber	Myanmar	A member of the family Elcanidae. The type species is T. jennywinterae.	
Unidigitus	Gen. et sp. nov	Disputed	Gu et al.	Cretaceous	Burmese amber	Myanmar	The type species is U. longialatus. Originally described as a member of Ensifera belonging to the family Pseudogryllotalpidae; subsequently assigned to the family Gryllidae by Cadena-Castañeda et al. (2024), who considered U. longialatus to be a junior synonym of Pherodactylus micromorphus.	

==== Orthopteran research ====
- Woodrow, Celiker & Montealegre-Z (2023) study the anatomy of ears and forewings of a specimen of Eomortoniellus handlirschi from the Eocene Baltic amber, estimate the calling song frequency in E. handlirschi, interpret its ear as tuned to the male song frequency but also capable of hearing higher-frequency sounds, and consider this to be possible adaptation to eavesdropping on bat echolocating calls.

=== Other panorthopterans ===
Name	Novelty	Status	Authors	Age	Type locality	Location	Notes	Images
Hispanopteron	Gen. et sp. nov	Valid	Santos et al.	Late Carboniferous		Spain	Genus includes new species H. romerali. Announced in 2022; the final article version was published in 2023.	
Lodevogramma	Fam., gen. et sp. nov	Valid	Nel et al.	Permian	Salagou Formation	France	A Caloneurodean; The type genus of Lodevogrammatidae. The type species is L. pumilia.	
Moscovacrida	Gen. et sp. nov	Valid	Peng et al.	Carboniferous		France	The type species is M. minuscula.	
Saarelcana	Gen. et sp. nov	Valid	Poschmann, Nel & Raisch	Permian (Asselian or early Sakmarian)	Meisenheim Formation	Germany	A member of Elcanoidea. The type species is S. stapsi.	

=== Phasmatodeans ===
Name	Novelty	Status	Authors	Age	Type locality	Location	Notes	Images
Breviala	Gen. et sp. nov	Valid	Yang, Engel, Shih & Gao in Yang et al.	Late Cretaceous (Cenomanian)	Burmese amber	Myanmar	A member of the family Timematidae. The type species is B. cretacea.	
Electroclavella	Gen. et sp. nov	Valid	Yang, Engel, Shih & Gao in Yang et al.	Late Cretaceous (Cenomanian)	Burmese amber	Myanmar	A member of the family Timematidae. The type species is E. genuina.	

== Clade Coleopterida ==
=== Coleopterans ===
==== Adephaga ====
Name	Novelty	Status	Authors	Age	Type locality	Country	Notes	Images
Cretoloricera	Gen. et sp. nov		Liu et al.	Cretaceous	Burmese amber	Myanmar	A ground beetle belonging to the subfamily Loricerinae. The type species is C. electra.	
Cretomophron	Gen. et sp. nov	Valid	Rosova, Prokop & Beutel in Rosová et al.	Cretaceous (Albian–Cenomanian)	Burmese amber	Myanmar	A ground beetle belonging to the subfamily Omophroninae. The type species is C. mutilus.	
Unda popovi	Sp. nov	Valid	Ponomarenko	Early Cretaceous		Russia (Buryatia)	A member of the family Trachypachidae.	

==== Archostemata ====
Name	Novelty	Status	Authors	Age	Type locality	Country	Notes	Images
Asiania	Gen. et sp. nov	Valid	Lee et al.	Early Cretaceous	Jinju Formation	South Korea	A member of the family Ommatidae. The type species is A. pax.	
Brachilatus	Gen. et comb. nov	Valid	Strelnikova & Yan	Jurassic and Cretaceous	Karabastau Formation	Kazakhstan	The type species is "Notocupes" nigrimonticola Ponomarenko (1968); genus also includes B. caducus (Ponomarenko, 1969), B. dundulaensis (Ponomarenko, 1994), B. foerstery (Ponomarenko, 1968), B. longicoxa (Soriano & Martinez-Delclòs, 2006), B. oculatus (Soriano & Martinez-Delclòs, 2006), B. premeris (Lee et al., 2022), B. spinosus (Li & Cai, 2023) and B. viridis (Soriano & Martinez-Delclòs, 2006).	
Brochocoleus sacheonensis	Sp. nov	Valid	Lee et al.	Early Cretaceous	Jinfu Formation	South Korea		
Circularva	Gen. et sp. nov	Valid	Shcherbakov & Ponomarenko	Permian (Wordian)	Bolshaya Kinel Formation	Russia (Orenburg Oblast)	Originally described as a beetle larva, possibly a member of the family Phoroschizidae/Schizophoridae; argued to be a member of Eumalacostraca of uncertain affinities by Makarov (2024). The type species is C. reichardti.	
Mallecupes cheni	Sp. nov		Wang et al.	Cretaceous	Burmese amber	Myanmar	A member of the family Cupedidae.	
Notocupes daohugouensis	Sp. nov	Valid	Li & Cai in Li et al.	Middle Jurassic	Haifanggou Formation	China		
Notocupes robustus	Sp. nov	Valid	Li & Cai in Li et al.	Middle Jurassic	Haifanggou Formation	China		
Notocupes spinosus	Sp. nov	Valid	Li & Cai in Li et al.	Middle Jurassic	Haifanggou Formation	China	Originally described as a species of Notocupes; Strelnikova & Yan (2023) transferred it to the genus Brachilatus.	
Zygadenia cornigera	Sp. nov	Valid	Lee et al.	Early Cretaceous	Jinfu Formation	South Korea		

==== Myxophaga ====
Name	Novelty	Status	Authors	Age	Type locality	Country	Notes	Images
Crowsonaerius	Gen. et sp. nov	Valid	Li & Cai in Li et al.	Cretaceous (Albian to Cenomanian)	Burmese amber	Myanmar	A member of the family Sphaeriusidae. The type species is C. minutus.	
Sphaerius martini	Sp. nov	Valid	Li & Cai in Li et al.	Cretaceous (Albian to Cenomanian)	Burmese amber	Myanmar	A species of Sphaerius.	

==== Polyphaga ====
===== Bostrichiformia =====
Name	Novelty	Status	Authors	Age	Type locality	Country	Notes	Images
Attagenus coziki	Sp. nov		Háva	Late Cretaceous (Cenomanian)	Burmese amber	Myanmar	A species of Attagenus.	
Eocenobius	Gen. et sp. nov	Valid	Alekseev et al.	Eocene	Baltic amber	Russia (Kaliningrad Oblast)	A member of the family Ptinidae belonging to the subfamily Ernobiinae and the tribe Ernobiini. The type species is E. praestigitator.	
Globicornis (Globicornis) samlandensis	Sp. nov	Valid	Bukejs et al.	Eocene	Baltic amber	Russia (Kaliningrad Oblast)	A species of Globicornis.	
Granulobium	Gen. et sp. nov	Valid	Li, Philips & Cai in Li et al.	Cretaceous (Albian to Cenomanian)	Burmese amber	Myanmar	A member of the family Ptinidae belonging to the subfamily Eucradinae and the tribe Hedobiini. The type species is G. whitei.	
Hyperisus carstengroehni	Sp. nov		Alekseev & Bukejs	Eocene	Baltic amber	Europe (Baltic Sea region)	A member of the family Ptinidae belonging to the subfamily Ernobiinae and the tribe Xestobiini.	
Nicobium cretaceum	Sp. nov		Háva & Zahradník	Late Cretaceous (Cenomanian)	Burmese amber	Myanmar	A species of Nicobium.	
Poinarinius coziki	Sp. nov	Valid	Háva & Legalov	Late Cretaceous (Cenomanian)	Burmese amber	Myanmar	A member of the family Bostrichidae belonging to the subfamily Alitrepaninae.	
Poinarinius decimus	Sp. nov		Háva & Legalov	Late Cretaceous (Cenomanian)	Burmese amber	Myanmar	A member of the family Bostrichidae belonging to the subfamily Alitrepaninae.	
Ranolus hrdlickai	Sp. nov		Háva	Eocene	Baltic amber	Russia (Kaliningrad Oblast)	A species of Ranolus.	

===== Cucujiformia =====
Name	Novelty	Status	Authors	Age	Type locality	Country	Notes	Images
Acicnemis sumatranus	Sp. nov	Valid	Legalov	Miocene	Sumatran amber	Indonesia	A member of the family Curculionidae belonging to the tribe Acicnemidini.	
Anoplodera volyniensis	Sp. nov	Valid	Vitali	Eocene	Rovno amber	Ukraine	A species of Anoplodera.	
Antirhelus	Gen. et comb. nov		Kirejtshuk in Kirejtshuk, Jenkins Shaw & Smirnov	Eocene	Rovno amber	Ukraine	A member of the family Kateretidae. The type species is "Heterhelus" buzina Kupryjanowicz, Lyubarsky & Perkovsky (2021).	
Archaeoluprops	Gen. et sp. nov	Valid	Nabozhenko, Perkovsky & Nazarenko	Eocene	Baltic amber	Russia (Kaliningrad Oblast)	A darkling beetle belonging to the subfamily Lagriinae. The type species is A. groehni.	
Arostropsis kirejtshuki	Sp. nov	Valid	Legalov	Eocene	Baltic amber	Europe (Baltic Sea region)	A weevil.	
Atomaria (Anchicera) propinqua	Sp. nov	Valid	Lyubarsky, Alekseev & Bukejs	Eocene	Baltic amber	Russia (Kaliningrad Oblast)	A species of Atomaria.	
Atomaria (Anchicera) telnovi	Sp. nov		Lyubarsky, Perkovsky & Vasilenko	Eocene	Rovno amber	Ukraine	A species of Atomaria.	
Baltamauroania	Gen. et et sp. nov	Valid	Tshernyshev et al.	Eocene	Baltic amber	Russia (Kaliningrad Oblast)	A member of Dasytidae. The type species is B. mirabilicornis.	
Baltanchonidium	Gen. et sp. nov	Valid	Legalov	Eocene	Baltic amber	Europe (Baltic Sea region)	A weevil belonging to the tribe Plinthini and the subtribe Typoderina. The type species is B. eocenicum.	
Baltimorda		Valid	Batelka, Rosová & Prokop	Eocene	Baltic amber	Europe (Baltic Sea region)	A collective group name for species belonging to the family Mordellidae and the tribe Mordellini described from the Baltic amber. Includes "Mordella" scheelei Ermisch (1941), "Mordellaria" friedrichi Perkovsky & Odnosum (2013) and "Tomoxia" succinea Bao et al. (2018).	
Baltistena		Valid	Batelka, Rosová & Prokop	Eocene	Baltic amber	Europe (Baltic Sea region)	A collective group name for species belonging to the family Mordellidae and the tribe Mordellistenini described from the Baltic amber. Includes "Mordellistena" amplicollis Ermisch (1941), "Mordellistena" antiqua Ermisch (1941), "Mordellistena" goeckei Ermisch (1941), "Mordellistena" korschefskyi Ermisch (1941), "Mordellistena" soror Ermisch (1941) and "Glipostena" sergeli Ermisch (1943), as well as new species B. ultima, B. aurata, B. longistrigata, B. hoffeinsorum, B. concava, B. brevispina and B. atronigra.	
Biphyllus lar	Sp. nov		Alekseev, Bukejs & Vitali	Eocene	Baltic amber	Europe (Baltic Sea region)	A species of Biphyllus.	
Bojebenzonia	Gen. et sp. nov		Legalov, Vasilenko & Perkovsky	Eocene	Baltic amber	Europe (Baltic Sea region)	A member of the family Belidae belonging to the subfamily Oxycoryninae and the tribe Oxycraspedini. The type species is B. karinae.	
Burmalachius	Gen. et sp. nov	Valid	Tshernyshev & Legalov	Cretaceous (Albian to Cenomanian)	Burmese amber	Myanmar	A member of the subfamily Malachiinae and the tribe Malachiini. The type species is B. acroantennatus.	
Burmalestes jingruoyaae	Sp. nov	Valid	Li & Caiin Li, Huang & Cai	Cretaceous (Albian to Cenomanian)	Burmese amber	Myanmar	A member of the family Endomychidae.	
Cartorhynchites (Hyperinvolvulus) groehni	Sp. nov	Valid	Legalov, Bukejs & Alekseev in Legalov et al.	Eocene	Baltic amber	Russia (Kaliningrad Oblast)	A member of the family Rhynchitidae.	
Cenocephalus josephi	Sp. nov	Valid	Legalov & Pankowski	Miocene	Ethiopian amber	Ethiopia	An ambrosia beetle belonging to the tribe Tesserocerini.	
Chaetastus samsockorum	Sp. nov	Valid	Legalov & Pankowski	Miocene	Ethiopian amber	Ethiopia	An ambrosia beetle belonging to the tribe Tesserocerini.	
Clypastraea groehni	Sp. nov		Szawaryn, Alekseev & Bukejs	Eocene	Baltic amber	Russia (Kaliningrad Oblast)	A species of Clypastraea.	
Clypastraea venedorum	Sp. nov		Szawaryn, Alekseev & Bukejs	Eocene	Baltic amber	Russia (Kaliningrad Oblast)	A species of Clypastraea.	
Coelodiplus	Gen. et sp. nov		Alekseev, Bukejs & Vitali	Eocene	Baltic amber	Europe (Baltic Sea region)	A member of the family Biphyllidae. The type species is C. uuu-impressa.	
Cretaparamecus angustus	Sp. nov		Arriaga-Varela et al.	Late Cretaceous	Burmese amber	Myanmar	A member of the family Endomychidae belonging to the subfamily Merophysiinae.	
Cretaparamecus crassipes	Sp. nov		Arriaga-Varela et al.	Late Cretaceous	Burmese amber	Myanmar	A member of the family Endomychidae belonging to the subfamily Merophysiinae.	
Cretaparamecus uncinus	Sp. nov		Arriaga-Varela et al.	Late Cretaceous	Burmese amber	Myanmar	A member of the family Endomychidae belonging to the subfamily Merophysiinae.	
Cretorhadalus	Gen. et sp. nov	Valid	Kolibáč & Prokop in Kolibáč et al.	Late Cretaceous (Cenomanian)	Burmese amber	Myanmar	A member of Cleroidea, possibly belonging to the family Rhadalidae. The type species is C. constantini.	
Diagrypnodes villumi	Sp. nov	Valid	Jenkins Shaw et al.	Eocene	Rovno amber	Ukraine	A member of the family Salpingidae belonging to the subfamily Inopeplinae.	
Donacia bienkowskii	Sp. nov	Valid	Bukejs & Alekseev in Bukejs, Alekseev & McKellar	Eocene	Baltic amber	Russia (Kaliningrad Oblast)	A species of Donacia	
Electrocoryssopus	Gen. et sp. nov	Valid	Legalov	Eocene	Baltic amber	Russia (Kaliningrad Oblast)	A weevil belonging to the family Curculionidae and the subfamily Conoderinae. Genus includes new species E. andrushchenkoi.	
Electrorhinus vlaskini	Sp. nov	Valid	Legalov, Vasilenko & Perkovsky	Eocene	Rovno amber	Ukraine	A member of the family Curculionidae belonging to the subfamily Molytinae and the tribe Aedemonini.	
Eodrias	Gen. et sp. nov	Valid	Batelka & Prokop	Cretaceous	Burmese amber	Myanmar	A member of the family Ripiphoridae belonging to the subfamily Ripidiinae and the tribe Eorhipidiini. The type species is E. mandibularis.	
Europs groehni	Sp. nov		Bukejs & Alekseev	Eocene	Baltic amber	Russia (Kaliningrad Oblast)	A species of Europs.	
Habropezus	Gen. et sp. nov	Valid	Poinar, Brown & Legalov in Legalov	Cretaceous	Burmese amber	Myanmar	A member of Mesophyletinae. The type species is H. plaisiommus. Announced in 2016; Legalov (2023) subsequently republished the description, stating that the journal where the original article was published does not have a printed version, and that the original article lacked information on registration in the ZooBank.	Habropezus plaisiommus
Henoticus groehni	Sp. nov	Valid	Bukejs, Lyubarsky & Alekseev	Eocene	Baltic amber	Russia (Kaliningrad Oblast)	A species of Henoticus.	
Juramordella	Gen. et sp. nov	In press	Sun et al.	Middle Jurassic	Daohugou Beds	China	A member of Tenebrionoidea belonging to the group Praemordellinae. The type species is J. asperula.	
Lagria koshimizui	Sp. nov		Nabozhenko & Tanaka	Pliocene (Piacenzian)	Motojuku Formation	Japan	A species of Lagria.	
Leiosoma (Palaeoleiosoma) michalski	Sp. nov	Valid	Legalov	Eocene	Baltic amber	Europe (Baltic Sea region)	A species of Leiosoma.	
Leiosoma (Palaeoleiosoma) shevnini	Sp. nov	Valid	Legalov	Eocene	Baltic amber	Europe (Baltic Sea region)	A species of Leiosoma.	
Lobatihelota	Gen. et 2 sp. nov	Valid	Li, Liu & Cai in Li et al.	Cretaceous	Burmese amber	Myanmar	A member of the family Helotidae. Genus includes L. lescheni and L. iridescens.	
Mekorhamphus	Gen. et sp. nov	Valid	Poinar, Brown & Legalov in Legalov	Cretaceous	Burmese amber	Myanmar	A member of Mesophyletinae. The type species is M. gyralommus. Announced in 2016; Legalov (2023) subsequently republished the description, stating that the journal where the original article was published does not have a printed version, and that the original article lacked information on registration in the ZooBank.	
Melipriopsis baltica	Sp. nov	Valid	Kirejtshuk & Bukejs	Eocene	Baltic amber	Russia (Kaliningrad Oblast)	A sap beetle.	
Mesosmicrips sunae	Sp. nov	Valid	Lyubarsky & Perkovsky in Lyubarsky et al.	Late Cretaceous (Cenomanian)	Burmese amber	Myanmar	A member of the family Smicripidae.	
Mychocerus gedanensis	Sp. nov	Valid	McHugh & Ślipiński in McHugh et al.	Eocene	Baltic amber	Russia (Kaliningrad Oblast)	A species of Mychocerus.	
Nausibius radchenkoi	Sp. nov	Valid	Alekseev, Pankowski & Bukejs	Eocene	Rovno amber	Ukraine	A species of Nausibius.	
Oracula campbelli	Sp. nov	Valid	Nabozhenko & Perkovsky	Eocene	Rovno amber	Ukraine	A darkling beetle belonging to the subfamily Alleculinae. Originally described as a species of Oracula, but subsequently transferred to the genus Glabracula.	
Oxycraspedus argetus	Sp. nov		Legalov & Poinar	Eocene	Baltic amber	Europe (Baltic Sea region)	A member of the family Belidae belonging to the subfamily Oxycoryninae.	
Palaeorhamphus (Falsorhamphus) alekseevi	Sp. nov	Valid	Legalov	Eocene	Baltic amber	Europe (Baltic Sea region)	A weevil belonging to the subtribe Palaeorhamphina.	
Parvacalles	Gen. et sp. nov	Valid	Legalov	Eocene	Baltic amber	Europe (Baltic Sea region)	A weevil belonging to the tribe Cryptorhynchini and the subtribe Tylodina. The type species is P. kotthoffi.	
Pastillus aethiopicus	Sp. nov		Smith & Szawaryn	Miocene	Ethiopian amber	Ethiopia	A species of Pastillus.	
Pedostrangalia ostensackeni	Sp. nov	Valid	Vitali	Eocene	Baltic amber	Europe (Baltic Sea region)	A species of Pedostrangalia.	
Pedostrangalia rovnensis	Sp. nov	Valid	Vitali	Eocene	Rovno amber	Ukraine	A species of Pedostrangalia.	
Petrimordella		Valid	Batelka, Rosová & Prokop	Eocene and Oligocene		France; Germany; United States (Colorado)	A collective group name for members of the family Mordellidae preserved as compression fossils in Eocene and Oligocene matrices. Includes "Mordella" lapidicola Wickham (1909), "Mordellistena" florissantensis Wickham (1912), "Mordellistena" smithiana Wickham (1913), "Mordellistena" nearctica Wickham (1914), "Mordellistena" protogaea Wickham (1914), "Mordellistena" scudderiana Wickham (1914), "Tomoxia" inundata Wickham (1914), "Mordella" stygia Wickham (1914), "Mordella" priscula Cockerell (1924), "Mordella" indata Statz (1952), "Mordella" nigrapilosa Statz (1952), "Stenalia" oligocenica Nel (1985) and "Isotrilophus" rasnitsyni Odnosum & Perkovsky (2016).	
Phenolia (Palaeoronia) haoranae	Sp. nov	Valid	Kirejtshuk & Jenkins Shaw in Kirejtshuk, Jenkins Shaw & Smirnov	Cretaceous	Burmese amber	Myanmar	A species of Phenolia.	
Pleuroceratos tertius	Sp. nov	Valid	Háva	Late Cretaceous (Cenomanian)	Burmese amber	Myanmar	A member of the family Phloeostichidae.	
Pogonocherus scutellatus	Nom. nov	Valid	Vitali	Eocene	Baltic amber	Europe (Baltic Sea region)	A longhorn beetle, a species of Pogonocherus; a replacement name for Pogonocherus scutellaris Vitali (2022).	
Polydrusus (Palaeodrosus) andrushchenkoi	Sp. nov	Valid	Legalov	Eocene	Baltic amber	Europe (Baltic Sea region)	A species of Polydrusus.	
Protokateretes	Gen. et sp. et comb. nov		Zhao, Huang & Cai	Cretaceous	Burmese amber	Myanmar	Originally described as a member of the family Kateretidae; subsequently argued to be a sap beetle belonging to the subfamily Apophisandrinae or a member of the separate family Apophisandridae. Genus includes new species P. megacephalus, as well as "Eoceniretes" antiquus Peris & Jelínek.	
Protoliota paleus	Sp. nov	Valid	Poinar, Vega & Legalov	Cretaceous	Burmese amber	Myanmar	A member of the family Silvanidae belonging to the subfamily Brontinae and the tribe Brontini.	
Prototrichalus jingpo	Sp. nov		Telnov & Kundrata in Telnov et al.	Late Cretaceous (Cenomanian)	Burmese amber	Myanmar	A member of the family Ischaliidae.	
Rovnostena		Valid	Batelka, Rosová & Prokop	Eocene	Rovno amber	Ukraine	A collective group name for species belonging to the family Mordellidae and the tribe Mordellistenini described from the Rovno amber. Includes "Glipostena" ponomarenkoi Odnosum & Perkovsky (2009).	
Succinacalles silvestris	Sp. nov	Valid	Legalov	Eocene	Baltic amber	Europe (Baltic Sea region)	A weevil belonging to the tribe Cryptorhynchini and the subtribe Cryptorhynchina.	
Succinometrioxena andrushchenkoi	Sp. nov	Valid	Legalov	Eocene	Baltic amber	Europe (Baltic Sea region)	A member of the family Belidae belonging to the subfamily Oxycoryninae and the tribe Metrioxenini.	
Succinostyphlus katarzynae	Sp. nov	Valid	Legalov	Eocene	Baltic amber	Europe (Baltic Sea region)	A weevil belonging to the tribe Ellescini and the subtribe Styphlina.	
Succinostyphlus squamosus	Sp. nov	Valid	Legalov	Eocene	Baltic amber	Europe (Baltic Sea region)	A weevil belonging to the tribe Ellescini and the subtribe Styphlina.	
Xenophagus simutniki	Sp. nov	Valid	Lyubarsky, Perkovsky & Vasilenko	Eocene (Priabonian)	Rovno amber	Ukraine	A member of the family Erotylidae belonging to the subfamily Xenoscelinae.	
Zopheromimus	Gen. et sp. nov	Valid	Alekseev & Nabozhenko	Eocene	Baltic amber	Russia (Kaliningrad Oblast)	A member of the family Zopheridae. The type species is Z. auriborussiensis.	

===== Elateriformia =====
Name	Novelty	Status	Authors	Age	Type locality	Country	Notes	Images
Balistica serrulata	Sp. nov	Valid	Otto	Miocene	Dominican amber	Dominican Republic	A member of the family Eucnemidae belonging to the subfamily Melasinae and the tribe Dirhagini.	
Burmophysorhinus	Gen. et sp. nov		Kundrata, Triskova & Prosvirov	Cretaceous	Burmese amber	Myanmar	A click beetle belonging to the subfamily Elaterinae, possibly a member of the tribe Physorhinini. The type species is B. dusaneki.	
Cacomorphocerus incurvus	Sp. nov	Valid	Fanti & Vitali	Eocene	Baltic amber	Russia (Kaliningrad Oblast)	A soldier beetle belonging to the subfamily Cantharinae and the tribe Cacomorphocerini.	
Cantharis michaeli	Sp. nov	Valid	Fanti & Pankowski	Eocene (Priabonian)	Rovno amber	Ukraine	A species of Cantharis.	
Cantharis samsocki	Sp. nov	Valid	Pankowski	Eocene	Baltic amber	Russia (Kaliningrad Oblast)	A species of Cantharis.	
Clavelater ryonsangiensis	Sp. nov		So et al.	Early Cretaceous (Barremian-Aptian)	Sinuiju Formation	North Korea	A click beetle belonging to the subfamily Protagrypninae and the tribe Protagrypnini.	
Cretocardiophorus	Gen. et sp. nov		Qiu & Ruan	Cretaceous	Burmese amber	Myanmar	A click beetle with similarities to members of the subfamily Cardiophorinae. The type species is C. laminatus.	
Cretoctesis	Gen. et sp. nov		Molino-Olmedo	Late Cretaceous (Cenomanian)	Burmese amber	Myanmar	A member of the family Buprestidae. The type species is C. conchimillanae. Published online in 2024, but the issue date is listed as December 2023.	
Cretocydistus	Gen. et sp. nov	Valid	Roza et al.	Cretaceous	Burmese amber	Myanmar	A member of the family Phengodidae. The type species is C. wittmeri.	
Curtelater ryonsangiensis	Sp. nov		So et al.	Early Cretaceous (Barremian-Aptian)	Sinuiju Formation	North Korea	A click beetle.	
Dictyorachys	Gen. et sp. nov	Valid	Li, Volkovitsh & Cai in Li et al.	Cretaceous (Albian to Cenomanian)	Burmese amber	Myanmar	A member of the family Buprestidae. The type species is D. callidictyus.	
Dromaeolus argenteus	Sp. nov	Valid	Otto	Miocene	Dominican amber	Dominican Republic	A member of the family Eucnemidae belonging to the subfamily Macraulacinae and the tribe Macraulacini.	
Dyscharachthis dominicana	Sp. nov	Valid	Otto	Miocene	Dominican amber	Dominican Republic	A member of the family Eucnemidae belonging to the subfamily Eucneminae and the tribe Dyscharachthini.	
Euryptychus antilliensis	Sp. nov	Valid	Otto	Miocene	Dominican amber	Dominican Republic	A member of the family Eucnemidae belonging to the subfamily Macraulacinae and the tribe Euryptychini.	
Euryptychus hispaniolus	Sp. nov	Valid	Otto	Miocene	Dominican amber	Dominican Republic	A member of the family Eucnemidae belonging to the subfamily Macraulacinae and the tribe Euryptychini.	
Fornax dominicensis	Sp. nov	Valid	Otto	Miocene	Dominican amber	Dominican Republic	A member of the family Eucnemidae belonging to the subfamily Macraulacinae and the tribe Macraulacini.	
Fornax serropalpoides	Sp. nov	Valid	Otto	Miocene	Dominican amber	Dominican Republic	A member of the family Eucnemidae belonging to the subfamily Macraulacinae and the tribe Macraulacini.	
Hiekeolycus winkleri	Sp. nov	Valid	Kazantsev & Yamamoto in Motyka et al.	Eocene (Priabonian)	Baltic amber	Russia (Kaliningrad Oblast)	A member of the family Lycidae belonging to the subfamily Erotinae and the tribe Dictyopterini. Published online in 2023, validated in 2025.	
Idiotarsus poinari	Sp. nov	Valid	Otto	Miocene	Dominican amber	Dominican Republic	A member of the family Eucnemidae belonging to the subfamily Eucneminae and the tribe Eucnemini.	
Maigus	Gen. et sp. nov	Valid	Fanti, Vitali & Pankowski	Eocene	Baltic amber	Russia (Kaliningrad Oblast)	A member of the family Berendtimiridae. The type species is M. sontagae.	
Malthinus (Malthinus) amicitiae	Sp. nov	Valid	Fanti & Vitali	Eocene	Baltic amber	Russia (Kaliningrad Oblast)	A species of Malthinus.	
Malthinus (Malthinus) karenpankowskiae	Sp. nov	Valid	Pankowski & Fanti	Eocene	Baltic amber	Russia (Kaliningrad Oblast)	A species of Malthinus.	
Malthinus (Malthinus) pauljohnsoni	Sp. nov	Valid	Pankowski & Fanti	Eocene	Baltic amber	Russia (Kaliningrad Oblast)	A species of Malthinus.	
Malthodes (Libertimalthodes) betseyae	Sp. nov	Valid	Pankowski & Fanti	Eocene	Baltic amber	Russia (Kaliningrad Oblast)	A species of Malthodes.	
Malthodes (Malthodes) greenwalti	Sp. nov	Valid	Pankowski & Fanti	Eocene	Baltic amber	Russia (Kaliningrad Oblast)	A species of Malthodes.	
Mioxylobius	Gen. et sp. nov	Valid	Otto	Miocene	Dominican amber	Dominican Republic	A member of the family Eucnemidae belonging to the subfamily Melasinae and the tribe Xylobiini. The type species is M. bicolor.	
Nematodes miocenensis	Sp. nov	Valid	Otto	Miocene	Dominican amber	Dominican Republic	A member of the family Eucnemidae belonging to the subfamily Macraulacinae and the tribe Nematodini.	
Nematodes thoracicus	Sp. nov	Valid	Otto	Miocene	Dominican amber	Dominican Republic	A member of the family Eucnemidae belonging to the subfamily Macraulacinae and the tribe Nematodini.	
Paleoquirsfeldia	Gen. et sp. nov	Valid	Otto	Miocene	Dominican amber	Dominican Republic	A member of the family Eucnemidae belonging to the subfamily Melasinae and the tribe Dirhagini. The type species is P. epicrana.	
Plesiofornax caribica	Sp. nov	Valid	Otto	Miocene	Dominican amber	Dominican Republic	A member of the family Eucnemidae belonging to the subfamily Macraulacinae and the tribe Macraulacini.	
Podistra madelineae	Sp. nov	Valid	Pankowski & Fanti	Eocene	Baltic amber	Russia (Kaliningrad Oblast)	A species of Podistra.	
Podosilis groehni	Sp. nov	Valid	Bukejs & Fanti	Eocene	Baltic amber	Russia (Kaliningrad Oblast)	A soldier beetle belonging to the subfamily Silinae.	
Silis (Silis) carsteni	Sp. nov	Valid	Bukejs & Fanti	Eocene	Baltic amber	Russia (Kaliningrad Oblast)	A species of Silis.	
Sucinorhagonycha carsteni	Sp. nov	Valid	Fanti	Eocene	Baltic amber	Russia (Kaliningrad Oblast)	A soldier beetle belonging to the subfamily Cantharinae and the tribe Cacomorphocerini.	
Sucinorhagonycha fabrizioi	Sp. nov	Valid	Pankowski	Eocene	Baltic amber	Russia (Kaliningrad Oblast)	A soldier beetle belonging to the subfamily Cantharinae and the tribe Cacomorphocerini.	
Sucinorhagonycha maryae	Sp. nov	Valid	Pankowski & Fanti	Eocene	Baltic amber	Russia (Kaliningrad Oblast)	A soldier beetle belonging to the subfamily Cantharinae and the tribe Cacomorphocerini.	
Trapezioceps	Gen. et sp. nov	Disputed	Qu, Jarzembowski & Luo in Qu et al.	Cretaceous	Burmese amber	Myanmar	Originally described as a soldier beetle belonging to the subfamily Cantharinae and the tribe Cantharini. The type species is T. longelytrum. Kundrata et al. (2023) considered Trapezioceps to be a junior synonym of the mysteriomorphid elateroid genus Mysteriomorphus, though the authors maintained T. longelytrum as a distinct species within the latter genus.	
Valdopogon	Gen. et sp. nov	Valid	Tihelka et al.	Early Cretaceous (Barremian)	Wealden amber	United Kingdom	A member of the family Artematopodidae. The type species is V. simpsoni.	

===== Scarabaeiformia =====
Name	Novelty	Status	Authors	Age	Type locality	Country	Notes	Images
Antiqusolidus	Gen. et sp. nov	Valid	Lu, Ahrens, Bai, Shih & Ren in Lu et al.	Early Cretaceous	Yixian Formation	China	A member of the family Scarabaeidae. The type species is A. maculatus.	
Ceratophyus yatagaii	Sp. nov		Aiba & Král	Pleistocene (Chibanian)	Shiobara Group	Japan	A species of Ceratophyus.	
Cretognathus	Gen. et sp. nov	Valid	Yamamoto	Cretaceous (Albian to Cenomanian)	Burmese amber	Myanmar	A stag beetle belonging to the subfamily Aesalinae and the tribe Ceratognathini. The type species is C. minutissimus.	
Mahengea	Gen. et sp. nov		Strümpher, Scholtz & Schlüter	Eocene		Tanzania	A member of Scarabaeoidea of uncertain affinities. The type species is M. mckayi.	
Oncelytris	Gen. et sp. nov	Valid	Li & Cai in Li, Huang & Cai	Cretaceous (Albian to Cenomanian)	Burmese amber	Myanmar	A stag beetle belonging to the tribe Ceratognathini. The type species is O. esquamatus.	
Protonicagus mandibularis	Sp. nov	Valid	Yamamoto	Cretaceous (Albian to Cenomanian)	Burmese amber	Myanmar	A stag beetle belonging to the subfamily Aesalinae and the tribe Nicagini.	
Scybalophagus brellenthinae	Sp. nov		Tello et al.	Late Pleistocene		Chile	A dung beetle.	
Valgus cantalensis	Sp. nov		Nel	Miocene		France	A species of Valgus.	

===== Staphyliniformia =====
Name	Novelty	Status	Authors	Age	Type locality	Country	Notes	Images
Acrulia danica	Sp. nov	Valid	Shavrin in Shavrin et al.	Eocene		Denmark	A species of Acrulia.	
Carinumerus intricatus	Sp. nov	Valid	Caterino & Yamamoto	Cretaceous	Burmese amber	Myanmar	A member of the family Histeridae belonging to the subfamily Onthophilinae.	
Cretanapleus	Gen. et sp. nov	Valid	Simon Pražák & Lackner in Simon Pražák et al.	Late Cretaceous (Cenomanian)	Burmese amber	Myanmar	A member of the family Histeridae belonging to the subfamily Dendrophilinae and the tribe Anapleini. The type species is C. seideli.	
Cymbiodyta samueli	Sp. nov	Valid	Fikáček et al.	Eocene	Baltic amber	Lithuania	A species of Cymbiodyta.	
Eleusis sulcata	Sp. nov	In press	Yamamoto	Cretaceous	Burmese amber	Myanmar	A species of Eleusis.	
Eocenostenus vanja	Sp. nov	Valid	Jenkins Shaw, Nel & Jouault	Paleocene (Selandian)	Menat Formation	France	A rove beetle belonging to the subfamily Steninae.	
Eulomalus balticus	Sp. nov	Valid	Simon-Pražák & Lackner in Simon-Pražák, Prokop & Lackner	Eocene (Priabonian)	Baltic amber	Russia (Kaliningrad Oblast)	A member of the family Histeridae belonging to the subfamily Dendrophilinae and the tribe Paromalini.	
Festenus annodutt	Sp. nov	Valid	Mainda	Early Cretaceous (Albian)	Hkamti amber	Myanmar	A rove beetle belonging to the subfamily Steninae.	
Kekveus brevisulcatus	Sp. nov	Valid	Li et al.	Cretaceous (Albian to Cenomanian)	Burmese amber	Myanmar	A member of the family Ptiliidae belonging to the subfamily Ptiliinae and the tribe Discheramocephalini.	
Kupakara	Gen. et 2 sp. nov		Chen et al.	Cretaceous	Burmese amber	Myanmar	A rove beetle belonging to the subfamily Oxytelinae, possibly a member of the tribe Blediini. Genus includes new species K. makranczyi and K. luminosus.	
Midinudon	Gen. et sp. nov	Valid	Tokareva & Żyła in Tokareva et al.	Cretaceous (Albian–Cenomanian)	Burmese amber	Myanmar	A rove beetle belonging to the subfamily Paederinae and the tribe Lathrobiini. The type species is M. juvenis.	
Olexum	Gen. et sp. nov	Valid	Simon Pražák & Lackner in Simon Pražák et al.	Late Cretaceous (Cenomanian)	Burmese amber	Myanmar	A member of the family Histeridae belonging to the subfamily Dendrophilinae. The type species is O. complanatum.	
Parabolitobius antiquus	Sp. nov		Yamamoto	Cretaceous (Albian–Cenomanian)	Burmese amber	Myanmar	A rove beetle belonging to the subfamily Mycetoporinae.	
Paraphloeostiba dominicana	Sp. nov		Shavrin & Jenkins Shaw in Jenkins Shaw et al.	Miocene	Dominican amber	Dominican Republic	A rove beetle belonging to the subfamily Omaliinae and the tribe Omaliini.	
Phasmister hkamticus	Sp. nov	Valid	Caterino & Yamamoto	Early Cretaceous	Hkamti amber	Myanmar	A member of the family Histeridae belonging to the subfamily Onthophilinae.	
Phasmister parallelus	Sp. nov	Valid	Caterino & Yamamoto	Cretaceous	Burmese amber	Myanmar	A member of the family Histeridae belonging to the subfamily Onthophilinae.	
Phloeocharis burmana	Sp. nov	In press	Yamamoto & Newton	Cretaceous (Albian–Cenomanian)	Burmese amber	Myanmar	A species of Phloeocharis.	
Platycretus	Gen. et sp. nov	Valid	Simon Pražák & Lackner in Simon Pražák et al.	Late Cretaceous (Cenomanian)	Burmese amber	Myanmar	A member of the family Histeridae belonging to the subfamily Histerinae. The type species is P. muscularis.	
Prosolierius thayerae	Sp. nov	Valid	Yamamoto	Cretaceous	Burmese amber	Myanmar	A rove beetle belonging to the subfamily Solieriinae.	
Vidya	Gen. et sp. nov		Chen et al.	Cretaceous	Burmese amber	Myanmar	A rove beetle belonging to the subfamily Oxytelinae and the tribe Syntomiini. The type species is V. scabra.	
Yethiha pubescens	Sp. nov	Valid	Simon Pražák & Lackner in Simon Pražák et al.	Late Cretaceous (Cenomanian)	Burmese amber	Myanmar	A member of the family Histeridae belonging to the subfamily Dendrophilinae.	

==== Coleopteran research ====
- Evidence from feathers and larval molts preserved in the Albian amber from the San Just, El Soplao and Peñacerrada I outcrops (Spain), indicating that Cretaceous beetle larvae fed on feathers of avian or nonavian theropods, is presented by Peñalver et al. (2023).
- Li et al. (2023) interpret Notocupes as a close relative of the family Cupedidae rather than an ommatid.
- Alleged specimen of the extant species Tetracha carolina reported from the Eocene Baltic amber (Kaliningrad Oblast, Russia) by Horn (1906) is reinterpreted as a specimen of Palaeoiresina cassolai by Schmidt et al. (2023).
- The first known close relative of the Neotropical genus Eohomopterus from the Old World is reported from the Eocene Rovno amber (Ukraine) by Kirichenko-Babko & Perkovsky (2023).
- Possible haliplid larvae are described from the Cretaceous amber from Myanmar by Linhart et al. (2023).
- Jenkins Shaw, Solodovnikov & Perkovsky (2023) report the discovery of a member of the genus Trichophya (related to the extant species Trichophya antennalis and distinct from Trichophya minor from the amber from Myanmar) from the Upper Cretaceous Taimyr amber from Yantardakh (Russia), documenting the existence of two morphologically different species groups of Trichophya in the Cretaceous.
- The first fossil of a member of the genus Proteinus reported to date is described from the Eocene Baltic amber from Denmark by Jenkins Shaw, Bai & Solodovnikov (2023).
- Cifuentes-Ruiz et al. (2023) describe an indeterminate ptinid specimen representing the first biological inclusion the Cenomanian amber from the Dexter Member of the Woodbine Group (Texas, United States) reported to date.
- Zippel et al. (2023) describe cucujiform (possibly endomychid) larvae from the Cretaceous Burmese amber and Miocene Mexican amber, interpreted as possible fungus-eaters on rotting wood.

== Clade Dictyoptera ==
Name	Novelty	Status	Authors	Age	Type locality	Country	Notes	Images
Archaeospinapteryx	Gen. et sp. nov	Valid	Sendi & Cumming in Sendi et al.	Late Cretaceous (Cenomanian)	Burmese amber	Myanmar	A member of the family Umenocoleidae. The type species is A. tartarensis.	
Caloblattina hrachova	Sp. nov	Valid	Majtaník in Majtaník & Kotulová	Probably Early Cretaceous		Kazakhstan	A cockroach.	
Cariblatta amfivola	Sp. nov		Estrada-Álvarez, Sormani & Núñez-Bazán in Estrada-Álvarez et al.	Miocene	Mexican amber	Mexico	A species of Cariblatta.	
Cariblatta simojovelensis	Sp. nov		Estrada-Álvarez, Sormani & Núñez-Bazán in Estrada-Álvarez et al.	Miocene	Mexican amber	Mexico	A species of Cariblatta.	
Cariblatta uchbena	Sp. nov		Estrada-Álvarez, Sormani & Núñez-Bazán in Estrada-Álvarez et al.	Miocene	Mexican amber	Mexico	A species of Cariblatta.	
Cratovitisma spinosa	Sp. nov	Valid	Sendi, Vršanský & Azar	Early Cretaceous (Barremian)	Lebanese amber	Lebanon		
Elisama globosa	Sp. nov	Valid	Vršanský, Sendi & Azar in Sendi, Vršanský & Azar	Early Cretaceous (Barremian)	Lebanese amber	Lebanon		
Elisamoides cudak	Sp. nov	Valid	Kováčová, Majtaník & Quicke	Jurassic, possibly Oxfordian	Phra Wihan Formation	Thailand	A cockroach.	
Falcatusiblatta kohringi	Sp. nov	Valid	Kováčová, Majtaník & Quicke	Jurassic, possibly Oxfordian	Phra Wihan Formation	Thailand	A cockroach.	
Gutierrezina	Gen. et sp. et comb. nov		Estrada-Álvarez, Sormani & Núñez-Bazán in Estrada-Álvarez et al.	Miocene	Mexican amber	Mexico	A member of Pseudophyllodromiidae. The type species is G. vrsanskyi; genus also includes "Supella" miocenica Vršanský et al. (2011).	
Huablattula vrsanskyi	Sp. nov	Valid	Zhang, Li & Luo	Cretaceous	Burmese amber	Myanmar	A cockroach belonging to the family Blattulidae.	
Neoblattella nechapetomu	Sp. nov	Valid	Vršanský, Sendi & Azar in Sendi, Vršanský & Azar	Early Cretaceous (Barremian)	Lebanese amber	Lebanon	A species of Neoblattella.	
Nigropterix	Gen. et sp. nov	Valid	Sendi in Sendi et al.	Late Cretaceous (Turonian)		Kazakhstan	A member of the family Umenocoleidae. The type species is N. angustata.	
Palaeosymploce	Gen. et sp. nov	Valid	Anisyutkin & Perkovsky	Eocene	Rovno amber	Ukraine	A cockroach belonging to the family Ectobiidae. Genus includes new species P. aristovi.	
Periplaneta? smithiae	Sp. nov	Valid	Barna, Zelagin & Šmídová	Eocene	Green River Formation	United States (Colorado)	Possibly a species of Periplaneta.	
Poikiloprosopon	Gen. et sp. nov	Valid	Sendi & Cumming in Sendi et al.	Late Cretaceous (Cenomanian)	Burmese amber	Myanmar	A member of the family Umenocoleidae. The type species is P. celiae.	
Praeblattella krzeminskii	Sp. nov	Valid	Kováčová, Majtaník & Quicke	Jurassic, possibly Oxfordian	Phra Wihan Formation	Thailand	A cockroach.	
Praeblattella solus	Sp. nov	Valid	Majtaník in Majtaník & Kotulová	Probably Early Cretaceous		Kazakhstan	A cockroach.	
Pravdupovediac	Gen. et 2 sp. nov	Valid	Sendi, Vršanský & Azar	Early Cretaceous (Barremian)	Lebanese amber	Lebanon	A member of the family Blattulidae. The type species is P. neklam; genus also includes P. maaloufi.	
Pseudomantina baijuyii	Sp. nov	Valid	Liang et al.	Middle Jurassic	Jiulongshan Formation	China	A cockroach belonging to the family Blattulidae.	
Raphidiomima predlzena	Sp. nov	Valid	Kováčová, Majtaník & Quicke	Jurassic, possibly Oxfordian	Phra Wihan Formation	Thailand	A cockroach.	
Sinuijublatta	Gen. et sp. nov	Valid	So & Won	Early Cretaceous	Sinuiju Formation	North Korea	A cockroach belonging to the family Caloblattinidae. The type species is S. sinuijuensa.	
Sivis tykadlo	Sp. nov	Valid	Kováčová	Cretaceous	Burmese amber	Myanmar	A cockroach belonging to the family Mesoblattinidae.	
Spinaeblattina tuanwangensis	Sp. nov		Zhang, Chen & Luo in Zhang et al.	Early Cretaceous	Laiyang Formation	China	A cockroach belonging to the family Mesoblattinidae.	
Supella eocenica	Sp. nov	Valid	Anisyutkin & Perkovsky	Eocene	Rovno amber	Ukraine	A cockroach, a species of Supella.	
Trapezionotum	Gen. et sp. nov	Valid	Sendi et al.	Late Cretaceous (Cenomanian)	Burmese amber	Myanmar	A member of the family Umenocoleidae. The type species is T. vrsanskyi.	
Umenotypus	Gen. et sp. nov	Valid	Sendi in Sendi et al.	Late Cretaceous (Turonian)		Kazakhstan	A member of the family Umenocoleidae. The type species is U. maculatus.	
Vrsanskysajda	Nom. nov	Valid	Jiang, Xing & Li	Cretaceous (Hauterivian?)		Algeria	A member of Holocompsinae; a replacement name for Sajda Vršanský.	
Vzrkadlenie karneri	Sp. nov	Valid	Sendi & Cumming in Sendi et al.	Late Cretaceous (Cenomanian)	Burmese amber	Myanmar	A member of the family Umenocoleidae.	
Vzrkadlenie saintgermaini	Sp. nov	Valid	Sendi & Cumming in Sendi et al.	Late Cretaceous (Cenomanian)	Burmese amber	Myanmar	A member of the family Umenocoleidae.	

== Hymenopterans ==
=== "Symphyta" ===
Name	Novelty	Status	Authors	Age	Type locality	Country	Notes	Images
Allenbycimbex	Gen. et sp. nov	Valid	Archibald & Rasnitsyn	Eocene; Ypresian	Allenby Formation	Canada; British Columbia	A Cimbicid sawfly. The type species is A. morrisae.	
Electrotoma kopylovi	Sp. nov	Valid	Rasnitsyn & Manukyan	Eocene	Baltic amber	Europe (Baltic Sea region)	A member of Tenthredinoidea belonging to the family Electrotomidae.	
Floricimbex	Gen. et comb. nov	Valid	Archibald & Rasnitsyn	Eocene; Priabonian	Florissant Formation	United States; Colorado	A Cimbicid sawfly The type species is Cimbex vetusculus Cockerell (1922).	Floricimbex vetusculus
Hanguksyntexis	Gen. et sp. nov	Valid	Rosse-Guillevic et al.	Early Cretaceous (Albian)	Jinju Formation	South Korea	A member of the family Anaxyelidae. The type species is H. haeretica.	
Leptostigma	Gen. et 7 sp. nov	Valid	Archibald & Rasnitsyn	Eocene (Ypresian)	Tranquille Formation	Canada; British Columbia	A Cimbicid sawfly The type species is L. brevilatum; genus also includes L. alaemacula, L. fasciatum, L. longiclava, L. longipallidum, L. longitenebricum and L. proxivena.	
Microxyela	Gen. et sp. nov		Denisova, Kopylov & Rasnitsyn	Triassic	Madygen Formation	Kyrgyzstan	A member of the family Xyelidae belonging to the subfamily Archexyelinae. The type species is M. minuta.	
Novoxyela	Gen. et sp. nov	Valid	Zheng, Zhang & Rasnitsyn	Middle Jurassic	Daohugou Beds	China	A member of the family Xyelidae. Genus includes new species N. bella.	
Oligomonoctenus	Gen. et sp. nov	Valid	Nel et al.	Oligocene		France	A member of the family Diprionidae. The type species is O. neytiriae.	
Platyxyela elegans	Sp. nov	Valid	Zheng, Zhang & Rasnitsyn	Middle Jurassic	Daohugou Beds	China	A member of the family Xyelidae.	
Prosyntexis antennata	Sp. nov	Valid	Li et al.	Cretaceous	Burmese amber	Myanmar	A member of the family Sepulcidae.	
Prosyntexis aristovi	Sp. nov	Valid	Li et al.	Cretaceous	Burmese amber	Myanmar	A member of the family Sepulcidae.	
Prosyntexis lata	Sp. nov	Valid	Li et al.	Cretaceous	Burmese amber	Myanmar	A member of the family Sepulcidae.	
Triassoxyela sharovi	Sp. nov		Denisova, Kopylov & Rasnitsyn	Triassic	Madygen Formation	Kyrgyzstan	A member of the family Xyelidae belonging to the subfamily Archexyelinae.	
Xyelinus scherbachov	Sp. nov		Denisova, Kopylov & Rasnitsyn	Triassic	Madygen Formation	Kyrgyzstan	A member of the family Xyelidae belonging to the subfamily Archexyelinae.	

=== Apocrita ===
==== Apoidea ====
===== New apoidean taxa =====
Name	Novelty	Status	Authors	Age	Type locality	Country	Notes	Images
Adactylurina	Gen. et comb. nov	Valid	Engel in Engel et al.	Miocene	Ethiopian amber	Ethiopia	A stingless bee. The type species is "Dactylurina" aethiopica Lepeco & Melo (2022).	
Angarosphex alethes	Sp. nov	Valid	Rosa & Melo	Cretaceous	Burmese amber	Myanmar	A member of the family Angarosphecidae.	
Burmasphex mirabilis	Sp. nov	Valid	Rosa & Melo	Cretaceous	Burmese amber	Myanmar	A member of the family Burmasphecidae.	
Callisphex	Gen. et sp. nov	Valid	Rosa & Melo	Cretaceous	Burmese amber	Myanmar	A member of the family Burmasphecidae. The type species is C. robustus.	
Simplisphex	Gen. et 2 sp. nov	Valid	Rosa & Melo	Cretaceous	Burmese amber	Myanmar	A member of the family Burmasphecidae. Genus includes S. scutellatus and S. burmensis.	

===== Apoid research =====
- A study on the evolutionary history of bees, inferred from the fossil record and genomic data, is published by Almeida et al. (2023).

==== Chalcidoidea ====
Name	Novelty	Status	Authors	Age	Type locality	Country	Notes	Images
Cretaxenomerus brevis	Sp. nov	Valid	Ulmer & Krogmann in Ulmer et al.	Early Cretaceous (Barremian)	Lebanese amber	Lebanon	A member of the family Protoitidae.	
Cretaxenomerus curvus	Sp. nov	Valid	Ulmer & Krogmann in Ulmer et al.	Early Cretaceous (Barremian)	Lebanese amber	Lebanon	A member of the family Protoitidae.	
Cretaxenomerus deangelis	Sp. nov	Valid	Ulmer & Krogmann in Ulmer et al.	Early Cretaceous (Barremian)	Lebanese amber	Lebanon	A member of the family Protoitidae.	
Cretaxenomerus mirari	Sp. nov	Valid	Ulmer & Krogmann in Ulmer et al.	Early Cretaceous (Barremian)	Lebanese amber	Lebanon	A member of the family Protoitidae.	
Cretaxenomerus tenuipenna	Sp. nov	Valid	Ulmer & Krogmann in Ulmer et al.	Early Cretaceous (Barremian)	Lebanese amber	Lebanon	A member of the family Protoitidae.	
Cretaxenomerus vitreus	Sp. nov	Valid	Ulmer & Krogmann in Ulmer et al.	Early Cretaceous (Barremian)	Lebanese amber	Lebanon	A member of the family Protoitidae.	
Electroanellus	Gen. et sp. nov	Valid	Simutnik in Simutnik & Perkovsky	Eocene		Denmark	A member of the family Encyrtidae belonging to the subfamily Tetracneminae. The type species is E. belokobylskiji.	
Electrocerus	Gen. et sp. nov	Valid	Simutnik in Simutnik, Pankowski & Perkovsky	Eocene	Baltic amber	Russia (Kaliningrad Oblast)	A member of the family Encyrtidae. The type species is E. brevifuniculatus.	
Eotriadomeroides	Gen. et sp. nov	Valid	Huber in Huber & Greenwalt	Eocene	Kishenehn Formation	United States (Montana)	A fairyfly. The type species is E. abjunctus Huber.	
Neanaperiallus defunctus	Sp. nov	Valid	Fusu in Gibson & Fusu	Eocene	Baltic amber	Poland	A member of the family Leptoomidae.	
Protoita	Fam. et gen. et 4 sp. nov		Ulmer & Krogmann in Ulmer et al.	Early Cretaceous (Barremian)	Lebanese amber	Lebanon	The type genus of the new family Protoitidae. Genus includes new species P. noyesi, P. bidentata, P. istvani and P. petersi.	

==== Chrysidoidea ====
Name	Novelty	Status	Authors	Age	Type locality	Country	Notes	Images
Azepyris	Gen. et sp. nov	Valid	Brazidec, Legendre & Perrichot	Early Cretaceous (Albian)	Hkamti amber	Myanmar	A member of the family Bethylidae belonging to the subfamily Lancepyrinae. The type species is A. delamarrei.	
Burmapyris ohmkuhnlei	Sp. nov	Valid	Brazidec, Legendre & Perrichot	Cretaceous (Albian-Cenomanian)	Burmese amber	Myanmar	A member of the family Bethylidae belonging to the subfamily Lancepyrinae.	
Chrysopsenella	Fam. et gen. et sp. nov	Valid	Lepeco & Melo	Cretaceous	Burmese amber	Myanmar	The type genus of the new family Chrysopsenellidae (closely related to Scolebythidae). The type species is C. euryphaessa.	
Crassibethylus	Gen. et sp. nov	Valid	Barbosa & Melo	Miocene	Dominican amber	Dominican Republic	A member of the family Bethylidae belonging to the subfamily Bethylinae. The type species is C. dominicanus.	
Gwesped	Gen. et sp. nov	Valid	Brazidec, Legendre & Perrichot	Cretaceous (Albian-Cenomanian)	Burmese amber	Myanmar	A member of the family Bethylidae belonging to the subfamily Lancepyrinae. The type species is G. groehni.	
Paralanceis	Gen. et sp. nov	Valid	Brazidec, Legendre & Perrichot	Early Cretaceous (Albian)	Hkamti amber	Myanmar	A member of the family Bethylidae belonging to the subfamily Lancepyrinae. The type species is P. chotardi.	
Thagyaminobythus	Gen. et sp. nov	Valid	Rosse-Guillevic, Jouault & Brazidec	Cretaceous	Burmese amber	Myanmar	A member of Chrysidoidea of uncertain affinities. The type species is T. martini.	
Thaumatodryinus cotyi	Sp. nov		Brazidec & Perrichot	Miocene	Mexican amber	Mexico	A member of the family Dryinidae.	
Yunbayin	Gen. et sp. nov	Valid	Brazidec, Legendre & Perrichot	Cretaceous (Albian-Cenomanian)	Hkamti amber	Myanmar	A member of the family Bethylidae belonging to the subfamily Lancepyrinae. The type species is Y. rossei.	

==== Diaprioidea ====
Name	Novelty	Status	Authors	Age	Type locality	Country	Notes	Images
Argemiones	Gen. et sp. nov	Valid	Brazidec	Late Cretaceous (Cenomanian)	Burmese amber	Myanmar	A member of the family Spathiopterygidae. The type species is A. stupeflip.	

==== Evanioidea ====
Name	Novelty	Status	Authors	Age	Type locality	Country	Notes	Images
Archeogastrinus	Gen. et sp. nov		Jouault & Rosse-Guillevic	Cretaceous	Burmese amber	Myanmar	A member of the family Praeaulacidae. The type species is A. kachinensis.	
Cretevania kachinensis	Sp. nov	Valid	Rosse-Guillevic & Jouault	Cretaceous	Burmese amber	Myanmar	A member of the family Evaniidae.	
Hadraulacus	Gen. et sp. nov		Li, Shih & Ren in Li et al.	Cretaceous	Burmese amber	Myanmar	A member of the family Praeaulacidae. The type species is H. perrarus.	
Iberoevania nova	Sp. nov		Li, Shih & Ren in Li et al.	Late Cretaceous (Cenomanian)	Burmese amber	Myanmar	A member of the family Evaniidae.	
Sorellevania guillami	Sp. nov	Valid	Jouault	Cretaceous	Burmese amber	Myanmar	A member of the family Evaniidae.	
Sorellevania rara	Sp. nov		Li, Shih & Ren in Li et al.	Late Cretaceous (Cenomanian)	Burmese amber	Myanmar	A member of the family Evaniidae.	

==== Formicoidea ====
===== New formicoidean taxa =====
Name	Novelty	Status	Authors	Age	Type locality	Country	Notes	Images
Damzenomyrmex	Gen. et sp. nov	Valid	Radchenko	Eocene	Rovno amber	Ukraine	A dolichoderine ant. The type species is D. ribbeckei.	
Dlusskyus	Gen. et sp. nov	Valid	Radchenko	Eocene; Priabonian	Baltic amber	Poland	A dolichoderine ant. The type species is D. groehni.	
Forelius chenpauch	Sp. nov	Valid	Varela-Hernández, Riquelme & Guerrero	Miocene	Mexican amber	Mexico	A species of Forelius.	
Gesomyrmex gallicus	Sp. nov	valid	Aria et al.	Eocene; Ypresian	Oise amber	France	An ant, a species of Gesomyrmex.	
Liometopum greenwalti	Sp. nov	Valid	Lapolla	Oligocene		United States (Montana)	A species of Liometopum.	
Manica iviei	Sp. nov	Valid	Lapolla	Oligocene		United States (Montana)	A species of Manica.	
Myrmica damzeni	Sp. nov	Valid	Radchenko	Eocene			A species of Myrmica.	
Myrmica dictyosa	Sp. nov	Valid	Radchenko	Eocene			A species of Myrmica.	
Myrmica electrina	Sp. nov	Valid	Radchenko	Eocene			A species of Myrmica.	
Myrmica saxonica	Sp. nov	Valid	Radchenko	Eocene		Germany	A species of Myrmica.	
Neoponera vejestoria	Sp. nov	Valid	Fiorentino et al.	Miocene; Burdigalian	Dominican amber	Dominican Republic	An ant, a species of Neoponera.	
Zigrasimecia boudinoti	Sp. nov	Valid	Chaul	Cretaceous; Cenomanian	Burmese amber	Myanmar	An iron maiden ant	
Zigrasimecia caohuijiae	Sp. nov	Valid	Chaul	Cretaceous; Cenomanian	Burmese amber	Myanmar	An iron maiden ant	
Zigrasimecia chuyangsui	Sp. nov	Valid	Chaul	Cretaceous; Cenomanian	Burmese amber	Myanmar	An iron maiden ant	
Zigrasimecia perrichoti	Sp. nov	Valid	Chaul	Cretaceous; Cenomanian	Burmese amber	Myanmar	An iron maiden ant	
Zigrasimecia thate	Sp. nov	Valid	Chaul	Cretaceous; Cenomanian	Burmese amber	Myanmar	An iron maiden ant	
Zigrasimecia zui	Sp. nov		Zhuang et al.	Cretaceous	Burmese amber	Myanmar	An iron maiden ant	

===== Formicoidea research =====
- A study on the ecology of haidomyrmecine ants is published by Sosiak et al. (2023), who interpret the studied ants as primarily leaf litter or ground-nesting and foraging predators, find support for specialized predation in several haidomyrmecine genera, and argue that the extinction of haidomyrmecines may have resulted in a vacant ecospace that was subsequently filled by members of modern ant lineages with trap-jaw like morphology and behavior.
- Archibald, Mathewes, & Aase (2023) document two additional fossils of Titanomyrma species ant queens from the Green River Formation and a single queen from the Eocene Okanagan Highlands Allenby Formation. They discuss the implications of the range extension for Formiciinae into the Ypresian temperate uplands, previously considered a thermophilic ant group, and the complication arising from preservational distortion during diagenesis.
- Zharkov & Dubovikoff (2023) report the first discovery of proventriculus in the fossil ants Oecophylla brischkei and Oecophylla crassinoda from the Eocene Baltic amber.

==== Ichneumonoidea ====
Name	Novelty	Status	Authors	Age	Type locality	Country	Notes	Images
Amberpoemenia	Gen. et sp. nov	Valid	Manukyan	Eocene	Baltic amber	Europe (Baltic Sea region)	A member of the family Ichneumonidae belonging to the subfamily Poemeniinae. The type species is A. kirejtshuki.	
Crusopimpla klopfsteinae	Sp. nov	Valid	Manukyan	Eocene	Baltic amber	Europe (Baltic Sea region)	A member of the family Ichneumonidae belonging to the subfamily Pimplinae.	
Electroncophanes	Gen. et sp. nov	Valid	Belokobylskij & Zaldívar-Riverón in Belokobylskij, Manukyan & Zaldívar-Riverón	Eocene	Baltic amber	Europe (Baltic Sea region)	A member of the family Braconidae belonging to the subfamily Rhyssalinae. The type species is E. laticauda.	
Eocenhecabolus	Gen. et sp. nov	Valid	Belokobylskij in Belokobylskij et al.	Eocene	Rovno amber	Ukraine	A member of the family Braconidae belonging to the subfamily Doryctinae. The type species is E. kotenkoi.	
Ephedrus carsteni	Sp. nov	Valid	Davidian in Davidian, Manukyan & Belokobylskij	Eocene	Baltic amber	Russia (Kaliningrad Oblast)	A member of the family Braconidae belonging to the subfamily Aphidiinae.	
Ephedrus zaikai	Sp. nov	Valid	Davidian in Davidian, Manukyan & Belokobylskij	Eocene	Prussian Formation (Baltic amber)	Russia (Kaliningrad Oblast)	A member of the family Braconidae belonging to the subfamily Aphidiinae.	
Firkantus	Gen. et sp. nov	Valid	Viertler, Klopfstein & Spasojevic in Viertler et al.	Eocene	Baltic amber	Denmark	A member of the family Ichneumonidae belonging to the subfamily Pimplinae. The type species is F. freddykruegeri.	
Magnocula	Gen. et sp. nov	Valid	Viertler, Klopfstein & Spasojevic in Viertler et al.	Eocene	Baltic amber	Denmark	A member of the family Ichneumonidae, possibly belonging to the subfamily Phygadeuontinae. The type species is M. sarcophaga.	
Palaeorhoptrocentrus	Gen. et sp. et comb. nov	Valid	Belokobylskij in Belokobylskij & Manukyan	Eocene	Baltic amber	Russia (Kaliningrad Oblast)	A member of the family Braconidae belonging to the subfamily Doryctinae. The type species is P. kanti; genus also includes "Doryctomorpha" tertiaria Brues (1933).	
Rhyssa gulliveri	Sp. nov	Valid	Viertler, Klopfstein & Spasojevic in Viertler et al.	Eocene	Baltic amber	Russia (Kaliningrad Oblast)	A species of Rhyssa.	
Theronia qaidamensis	Sp. nov		Dai et al.	Oligocene	Shangganchaigou Formation	China	A species of Theronia.	
Tibialobracon laevis	Sp. nov		Li et al.	Cretaceous (Albian-Cenomanian)	Burmese amber	Myanmar	A member of the family Braconidae belonging to the subfamily Protobraconinae.	
Triclistus levii	Sp. nov	Valid	Viertler, Klopfstein & Spasojevic in Viertler et al.	Miocene	Dominican amber	Dominican Republic	A species of Triclistus.	
Vertibracon	Gen. et sp. nov		Van Achterberg & Chen in Li et al.	Cretaceous (Albian-Cenomanian)	Burmese amber	Myanmar	A member of the family Braconidae of uncertain affinities. The type species is V. brevistigma Chen & van Achterberg in Li et al..	

==== Platygastroidea ====
Name	Novelty	Status	Authors	Age	Type locality	Country	Notes	Images
Caradiophyodus	Fam. et gen. et sp. nov	Valid	Poinar & Vega	Cretaceous	Burmese amber	Myanmar	The type genus of the new family Caradiophyodidae. The type species is C. saradae.	

==== Pompiloidea ====
Name	Novelty	Status	Authors	Age	Type locality	Country	Notes	Images
Burmusculus flexus	Sp. nov		Li et al.	Late Cretaceous (Cenomanian)	Burmese amber	Myanmar	A member of the family Burmusculidae.	
Burmusculus mutatus	Sp. nov		Li et al.	Late Cretaceous (Cenomanian)	Burmese amber	Myanmar	A member of the family Burmusculidae.	
Paleogenia indomini	Sp. nov	Valid	Colombo & Waichert in Colombo, Rodriguez & Waichert	Eocene	Baltic amber	Russia (Kaliningrad Oblast)	A pepsine spider wasp.	
Paleogenia waichertae	Sp. nov	Valid	Loktionov, Lelej & Perkovsky in Loktionov et al.	Eocene	Rovno amber	Ukraine	A pepsine spider wasp.	

==== Proctotrupoidea ====
Name	Novelty	Status	Authors	Age	Type locality	Country	Notes	Images
Abropelecinus rasnitsyni	Sp. nov		Wang et al.	Cretaceous	Burmese amber	Myanmar	A member of the family Pelecinidae.	
Abropelecinus rectus	Sp. nov		Wang et al.	Cretaceous	Burmese amber	Myanmar	A member of the family Pelecinidae.	
Allopelecinus ruoyae	Sp. nov		Wang et al.	Cretaceous	Burmese amber	Myanmar	A member of the family Pelecinidae.	
Ampluspelecinus	Gen. et sp. nov	Valid	Uchida	Late Cretaceous (Cenomanian)	Burmese amber	Myanmar	A member of the family Pelecinidae. The type species is A. robustus.	
Eopelecinus diminutivum	Sp. nov	Valid	Uchida	Early Cretaceous (Albian)	Hkamti amber	Myanmar	A member of the family Pelecinidae.	
Eopelecinus strangulatus	Sp. nov		Wang et al.	Cretaceous	Burmese amber	Myanmar	A member of the family Pelecinidae.	
Korehelorus	Gen. et sp. nov		Rosse-Guillevic et al.	Early Cretaceous (Albian)	Jinju Formation	South Korea	A member of the family Heloridae. The type species is K. jinjuensis.	
Stelepelecinus minutus	Sp. nov		Wang et al.	Cretaceous	Burmese amber	Myanmar	A member of the family Pelecinidae. Chemyreva & Kolyada (2026) assigned this species to the genus Eopelecinus, and coined a replacement name Eopelecinus wangae.	

==== Stephanoidea ====
Name	Novelty	Status	Authors	Age	Type locality	Country	Notes	Images
Aphanostephanus	Gen. et comb. nov	Valid	Ge & Tan in Ge et al.	Eocene	Baltic amber	Europe (Baltic Sea region)	A member of the family Stephanidae. The type species is "Electrostephanus" janzeni Engel (2005).	
Denaeostephanus chaofeng	Sp. nov	Valid	Ge & Tan in Ge et al.	Eocene	Baltic amber	Europe (Baltic Sea region)	A member of the family Stephanidae.	
Leptephialtites zhangi	Sp. nov	Valid	Ding & Zhang	Jurassic (Callovian to Oxfordian)	Daohugou Beds	China	A member of the family Ephialtitidae.	
Neurastephanus	Gen. et comb. nov	Valid	Ge & Tan in Ge et al.	Eocene	Baltic amber	Europe (Baltic Sea region)	A member of the family Stephanidae. The type species is "Electrostephanus" neovenatus Aguiar & Janzen (1999).	
Tumidistephanus	Gen. et sp. nov	Valid	Ge & Tan in Ge et al.	Cretaceous	Burmese amber	Myanmar	A member of the family Stephanidae. The type species is T. prometheus.	

==== Vespoidea ====
Name	Novelty	Status	Authors	Age	Type locality	Country	Notes	Images
Vespatula	Gen. et sp. nov	Valid	Jouault	Cretaceous	Burmese amber	Myanmar	A member of the family Vespidae. The type species is V. condaminei.	

== Clade Neuropterida ==
=== Megalopterans ===
Name	Novelty	Status	Authors	Age	Type locality	Country	Notes	Images
Izyumochauliodes	Gen. et sp. nov	Valid	Prokin & Bashkuev	Late Triassic	Protopivka Formation	Ukraine	A member of the family Corydalidae belonging to the family Chauliodinae. The type species is I. aristovi.	

=== Neuropterans ===
==== New neuropteran taxa ====
Name	Novelty	Status	Authors	Age	Type locality	Country	Notes	Images
Ankyloleon caroluspetrus	Sp. nov	Valid	Haug & Haug	Late Cretaceous (Cenomanian)	Burmese amber	Myanmar	A member of Myrmeleontiformia.	
Archibaldia	Gen., comb. et sp. nov	Valid	Makarkin	Eocene; Ypresian	Eocene Okanagan Highlands; Klondike Mountain Formation	United States (Washington)	A Hemerobiid brown lacewing. The type species is Cretomerobius wehri (2003); Genus also includes new species A. aristovi.	
Burmopsychops isodiametrus	Sp. nov		Peng et al.	Late Cretaceous (Cenomanian)	Burmese amber	Myanmar	A member of the family Kalligrammatidae belonging to the subfamily Cretanallachiinae.	
Burmopsychops shihi	Sp. nov		Peng et al.	Late Cretaceous (Cenomanian)	Burmese amber	Myanmar	A member of the family Kalligrammatidae belonging to the subfamily Cretanallachiinae.	
Chrysopa? extensa	Sp. nov	Valid	Chen et al.	Eocene	Baltic amber	Europe (Baltic Sea region)	Possibly a species of Chrysopa.	
Chrysopa? prominenta	Sp. nov	Valid	Chen et al.	Miocene	Mexican amber	Mexico	Possibly a species of Chrysopa.	
Cretapsychops epunctatus	Sp. nov	Valid	Liu et al.	Middle Jurassic	Jiulongshan Formation	China	A member of the family Psychopsidae.	
Cretapsychops stigmosus	Sp. nov	Valid	Liu et al.	Middle Jurassic	Jiulongshan Formation	China	A member of the family Psychopsidae.	
Dicranoberotha	Gen. et 2 sp. nov	Valid	Zhuo, Li & Liu in Li et al.	Cretaceous	Burmese amber	Myanmar	A member of the family Rhachiberothidae. Genus includes D. zhangzhiqiae and D. liumohanae.	
Enigmadipteromantispa dilatata	Sp. nov	Valid	Li, Nakamine, Yamamoto & Liu in Li et al.	Cretaceous	Burmese amber	Myanmar	A member of the family Dipteromantispidae.	
Ferganoberotha	Gen. et sp. nov	Valid	Khramov	Triassic	Madygen Formation	Kyrgyzstan	A member of the family Berothidae. The type species is F. minutissima.	
Gigantoconis	Gen. et sp. nov		Xiao, Ren & Wang in Xiao et al.	Late Cretaceous (Cenomanian)	Burmese amber	Myanmar	A member of the family Coniopterygidae belonging to the subfamily Aleuropteryginae. The type species is G. septemimacula.	
Girafficervix	Gen. et sp. nov		Du, Niu & Bao	Middle Jurassic	Jiulongshan Formation	China	A Nevrorthid lacewing. The type species is G. baii.	
Haplacantha	Gen. et 2 sp. nov	Valid	Li et al.	Cretaceous	Burmese amber	Myanmar	A member of the family Mantispidae. Genus includes H. robusta and H. tenuis.	
Kurtodipteromantispa relicta	Sp. nov	Valid	Li, Nakamine, Yamamoto & Liu in Li et al.	Cretaceous	Burmese amber	Myanmar	A member of the family Dipteromantispidae.	
Kurtodipteromantispa univenula	Sp. nov	Valid	Li et al.	Cretaceous	Burmese amber	Myanmar	A member of the family Dipteromantispidae.	
Longantenna	Gen. et sp. nov	Valid	Li et al.	Cretaceous	Burmese amber	Myanmar	A brown lacewing. The type species is L. hei.	
Madygoneura	Gen. et sp. nov		Khramov	Triassic	Madygen Formation	Kyrgyzstan	A member of the family Archeosmylidae. The type species is M. elongata.	
Mesomantispoides	Gen. et sp. nov	Valid	Li et al.	Cretaceous	Burmese amber	Myanmar	A member of the family Mantispidae. The type species is M. felixoporcus.	
Mesypochrysa nielseni	Sp. nov	Valid	Makarkin & Perkovsky	Eocene	Fur Formation	Denmark	A member of the family Chrysopidae belonging to the subfamily Limaiinae.	
Minimochrysa	Gen. et sp. nov	Valid	Jepson & Makarkin	Eocene	Kishenehn Formation	United States (Montana)	A green lacewing. The type species is M. latialata.	
Minipsychops	Gen. et 4 sp. nov	Valid	Liu et al.	Middle Jurassic (Callovian)	Jiulongshan Formation	China	An osmylopsychopid psychopsoid. The type species is M. sparsulus; genus also includes M. polychotomus, M. densus and M. unicus.	
Momonokus	Gen. et sp. nov	Valid	Khramov et al.	Late Triassic	Momonoki Formation	Japan	A member of Osmyloidea of uncertain affinities. The type species is M. obscurus.	
Nipponopsychops	Gen. et sp. nov	Valid	Khramov et al.	Late Triassic	Momonoki Formation	Japan	A member of the family Osmylopsychopidae. The type species is N. fusilis.	
Nullipsychops	Gen. et sp. nov	Valid	Liu et al.	Middle Jurassic	Jiulongshan Formation	China	A member of the family Psychopsidae. The type species is N. longialatus.	
Ominopsis	Gen. et sp. nov	Valid	Khramov et al.	Late Triassic	Momonoki Formation	Japan	A member of Ithonoidea of uncertain affinities. The type species is O. enigmaticus.	
Osmyloberotha chenzuyini	Sp. nov	Valid	Zhuo, Li & Liu in Li et al.	Cretaceous	Burmese amber	Myanmar	A member of the family Berothidae.	
Osmyloberotha dispersa	Sp. nov	Valid	Li et al.	Cretaceous	Burmese amber	Myanmar	A member of the family Berothidae.	
Osmyloberotha magnimaculata	Sp. nov	Valid	Li et al.	Cretaceous	Burmese amber	Myanmar	A member of the family Berothidae.	
Osmylotriasia	Gen. et sp. nov		Khramov	Triassic	Madygen Formation	Kyrgyzstan	A member of the family Archeosmylidae. The type species is O. superba.	
Palaeochrysa greenwalti	Sp. nov	Valid	Jepson & Makarkin	Eocene	Kishenehn Formation	United States (Montana)	A green lacewing.	
Palaeochrysa minor	Sp. nov	Valid	Jepson & Makarkin	Eocene	Kishenehn Formation	United States (Montana)	A green lacewing.	
Paraberothoides	Gen. et sp. nov	Valid	Li, Zhang & Liu in Li et al.	Cretaceous	Burmese amber	Myanmar	A member of the family Rhachiberothidae belonging to the subfamily Paraberothinae. The type species is P. longispina.	
Paracratochrysa	Gen. et 2 sp. nov		Chen, Xu & Liu	Late Cretaceous (Cenomanian)	Burmese amber	Myanmar	A corydasialid lacewing. Genus includes P. ternaria and P. bifurcata.	
Parvosymphrasites	Gen. et sp. nov	Valid	Li, Lin, Liu & Wang in Li et al.	Cretaceous	Burmese amber	Myanmar	A member of the family Mantispidae belonging to the subfamily Symphrasinae. The type species is P. aploneura.	
Planiconis	Gen. et sp. nov		Xiao et al.	Late Cretaceous (Cenomanian)	Burmese amber	Myanmar	A member of the family Coniopterygidae belonging to the subfamily Aleuropteryginae. The type species is P. bimaculata.	
Praealeurolobus	Gen. et sp. nov	Valid	Drohojowska et al.	Pliocene	Rajdanda Formation	India	A whitefly belonging to the subfamily Aleyrodinae and the tribe Aleurolobini. The type species is P. indicus.	
Principiala sinuijuensis	Sp. nov		Won et al.	Early Cretaceous	Sinuiju Formation	North Korea	A member of the family Ithonidae.	
Proplega	Gen. et sp. nov	Valid	Zhuo, Li & Liu in Li et al.	Cretaceous	Burmese amber	Myanmar	A member of the family Mantispidae belonging to the subfamily Symphrasinae. The type species is P. evelynae.	
Pseudoameropterus	Gen. et sp. nov	Valid	Jepson & Makarkin	Eocene	Kishenehn Formation	United States (Montana)	An owlfly. The type species is P. ambiguus.	
Pycnopolystoechotes	Gen. et sp. nov	Valid	Gao, Xu & Wang in Gao et al.	Middle Jurassic	Jiulongshan Formation	China	A member of the family Ithonidae. The type species is P. striatus.	
Relictovia	Gen. et sp. nov		Khramov	Triassic	Madygen Formation	Kyrgyzstan	A member of the family Permithonidae. The type species is R. pristina.	
Simplicorydasialis	Gen. et 2 sp. nov		Chen, Xu & Liu	Late Cretaceous (Cenomanian)	Burmese amber	Myanmar	A corydasialid lacewing. Genus includes S. fangyuani and S. simplicivenia.	
Sisyroneurorthus	Gen. et sp. nov	Valid	Nakamine et al.	Cretaceous (Albian to Cenomanian)	Burmese amber	Myanmar	A member of the family Nevrorthidae. The type species is S. aspoeckorum.	
Stictopolystoechotes	Gen. et sp. nov	Valid	Gao, Xu & Wang in Gao et al.	Middle Jurassic	Jiulongshan Formation	China	A member of the family Ithonidae. The type species is S. sparsulus.	
Toarciconiopteryx	Gen. et sp. nov	In press	Makarkin & Ansorge	Early Jurassic (Toarcian)	Grimmen Formation	Germany	A dustywing. The type species is T. dipterosimilis.	
Triasella	Gen. et sp. nov		Khramov	Triassic	Madygen Formation	Kyrgyzstan	A member of the family Archeosmylidae. The type species is T. ovata.	
Triassoberotha	Gen. et sp. nov	Valid	Khramov et al.	Late Triassic	Momonoki Formation	Japan	A member of the family Berothidae. The type species is T. japonica.	
Yamaguchius	Gen. et sp. nov	Valid	Khramov et al.	Late Triassic	Momonoki Formation	Japan	A member of Ithonoidea of uncertain affinities. The type species is Y. splendidus.	

==== Neuropteran research ====
- The oldest dustywing-type larva reported to date is described from the Cretaceous amber from Myanmar by Haug & Haug (2023).
- Mengel et al. (2023) describe new nevrorthid larvae from the Cretaceous amber from Myanmar and from the Eocene Baltic amber, and study on the morphological diversity of nevrorthid larvae, reporting the existence of fossil larvae with morphologies that are now extinct.
- New fossil material of long-nosed antlion larvae, mostly from the Cretaceous Myanmar amber (and two specimens from the Eocene Baltic amber), is described by Hassenbach et al. (2023), who interpret the studied fossils as confirming that the morphological diversity of Cretaceous silky lacewings was much higher than the diversity of their extant relatives.
- A study on the diversity of lacewing larvae with tooth-bearing mouthparts, based on data from new specimens from the Cretaceous Myanmar amber, is published by Braig et al. (2023), who interpret their findings as indicative of greater morphological diversity of the Cretaceous larvae than extant larvae, as well as indicative of convergent evolution resulting in partial reappearance of morphologies that went extinct after the Cretaceous.

=== Raphidiopterans ===
Name	Novelty	Status	Authors	Age	Type locality	Country	Notes	Images
Dolichoraphidia groehni	Sp. nov		Makarkin	Cretaceous	Burmese amber	Myanmar	A member of the family Mesoraphidiidae.	
Macrostigmoraphia	Gen. et sp. nov	Valid	Jepson & Makarkin	Eocene	Kishenehn Formation	United States (Montana)	A member of the family Raphidiidae. The type species is M. diluta.	

== Clade †Palaeodictyopteroidea ==
=== †Megasecoptera ===
Name	Novelty	Status	Authors	Age	Type locality	Location	Notes	Images
Corydaloides leonensis	Sp. nov	Valid	Santos et al.	Late Carboniferous		Spain	A member of the family Corydaloididae. Announced in 2022; the final article version was published in 2023.	
Mischoptera bergidensis	Sp. nov	Valid	Santos et al.	Late Carboniferous		Spain	A member of the family Mischopteridae. Announced in 2022; the final article version was published in 2023.	

=== †Palaeodictyoptera ===
Name	Novelty	Status	Authors	Age	Type locality	Location	Notes	Images
Heolus martinclosasi	Sp. nov	Valid	Delclòs, Peñalver & Nel	Carboniferous (Pennsylvanian)	Castellar de N'Hug-Camprodon Basin	Spain	A member of the family Heolidae.	
Katosaxoniapteron	Gen. et sp. nov		Prokop et al.	Carboniferous (Moscovian - Westphalian D)	Osnabrück Formation	Germany	A member of Eugereonoidea of uncertain affinities. The type species is K. brauneri.	

== Clade Palaeoptera ==
=== Ephemeropterans ===
==== New ephemeropteran taxa ====
Name	Novelty	Status	Authors	Age	Type locality	Country	Notes	Images
Astraeoptera oligovenata	Sp. nov	Valid	Storari, Staniczek & Godunko	Early Cretaceous (Aptian)	Crato Formation	Brazil	A mayfly belonging to the superfamily Siphlonuroidea and the family Astraeopteridae.	
Astraeoptera vitrea	Sp. nov	Valid	Storari, Staniczek & Godunko	Early Cretaceous (Aptian)	Crato Formation	Brazil	A mayfly belonging to the superfamily Siphlonuroidea and the family Astraeopteridae.	
Burmaheptagenia	Gen. et sp. nov	Disputed	Chen & Zheng	Cretaceous	Burmese amber	Myanmar	A mayfly belonging to the family Heptageniidae or Vietnamellidae. Genus includes new species B. zhouchangfai. Godunko et al. (2025) considered Burmaheptagenia to be a junior synonym of the genus Burmella, though the authors maintained B. zhouchangfai as a distinct species within the latter genus.	
Crepotamanthus	Gen. et sp. nov		Zheng & Chen	Cretaceous	Burmese amber	Myanmar	A mayfly belonging to the family Australiphemeridae. Genus includes new species C. spinitarsus.	
Eosophobia	Gen. et sp. nov	Valid	Storari, Staniczek & Godunko	Early Cretaceous (Aptian)	Crato Formation	Brazil	A mayfly belonging to the superfamily Siphlonuroidea and the family Astraeopteridae. The type species is E. acuta.	
Longiheptagenia	Gen. et 2 sp. nov		Yang et al.	Cretaceous	Burmese amber	Myanmar	A mayfly belonging to the family Heptageniidae. Genus includes new species L. elegantula and L. bipartita.	
Oculephemera	Fam. et gen. et sp. nov	Valid	Zheng & Chen	Cretaceous	Burmese amber	Myanmar	A mayfly belonging to the new family Oculephemeridae. Genus includes new species O. mazhenxingi.	
Siphlonephemerella	Fam. et gen. et sp. nov		Chen & Zheng	Cretaceous	Burmese amber	Myanmar	A mayfly, the type genus of the new family Siphlonephemerellidae within the superfamily Siphlonuroidea. Genus includes new species S. mupengxui.	

==== Ephemeropteran research ====
- A study on the diversity of mayflies throughout their evolutionary history is published by Sroka, Godunko & Prokop (2023), who interpret their findings as indicative of a major extinction of mayflies in the mid-Cretaceous which was likely connected to the rise of the flowering plants.

=== Odonatopterans ===
==== New odonatopteran taxa ====
Name	Novelty	Status	Authors	Age	Type locality	Country	Notes	Images
Albertalestes	Gen. et sp. nov	Valid	Jouault et al.	Paleocene	Paskapoo Formation	Canada (Alberta)	A member of the family Synlestidae. The type species is A. paskapooensis.	
Bilebullephlebia	Gen. et sp. nov	Valid	Jouault & Nel	Cretaceous	Burmese amber	Myanmar	A damsel-dragonfly belonging to the family Burmaphlebiidae. The type species is B. legendrei.	
Brasiliupanshania	Gen. et sp. nov		Ribeiro & Nel	Early Cretaceous (Aptian)	Crato Formation	Brazil	A dragonfly belonging to the family Liupanshaniidae. Genus includes new species B. cretacica.	
Cordulibellula	Fam. et gen. et sp. nov	Valid	Sroka, Howells & Nel	Eocene	Green River Formation	United States (Utah)	A dragonfly belonging to the group Cavilabiata, the type genus of the new family Cordulibellulidae. The type species is C. inopinata.	
Cymatophlebia daohugouensis	Sp. nov		Fan et al.	Middle Jurassic (Callovian)	Haifanggou Formation	China	A dragonfly belonging to the family Cymatophlebiidae.	
Furagrion ansorgei	Comb. & syn nov	Valid	(Zessin)	Eocene (Ypresian)	Fur Formation	Denmark	A zygopteran damselfly of uncertain family affinities. Species from Morsagrion ansorgei (2011). Morsagrion deemed a jr genus synonym of Furagrion	
Haidilaozhen	Fam. et gen. et sp. nov		Yang, Ren & Béthoux	Carboniferous (Moscovian)	Yanghugou Formation	China	The type genus of the new family Haidilaozhenidae. The type species is H. cuiae.	
Issadoneura	Gen. et sp. nov	Valid	Felker	Permian		Russia	A protozygopteran belonging to the family Progoneuridae. The type species is I. marilevorum. Published online in 2024, but the issue date is listed as December 2023.	
Kennedya sylvensis	Sp. nov	Valid	Felker	Permian		Russia	A protozygopteran belonging to the family Kennedyidae. Published online in 2024, but the issue date is listed as December 2023.	
Kennedya volatica	Sp. nov	Valid	Felker	Permian		Russia	A protozygopteran belonging to the family Kennedyidae. Published online in 2024, but the issue date is listed as December 2023.	
Lebanoaktassia	Gen. et sp. nov		Azar & Nel	Late Cretaceous (Cenomanian)		Lebanon	A dragonfly belonging to the superfamily Petaluroidea and the family Aktassiidae. The type species is L. curiosa.	
Libanogomphus	Fam. et gen. et sp. nov		Azar & Nel	Late Cretaceous (Cenomanian)		Lebanon	A dragonfly, the type genus of the new gomphid family Libanogomphidae. Genus includes new species L. lionelcavini.	
Nelala chacay	Sp. nov	Valid	Petrulevičius	Eoocene		Argentina	A member of Odonata belonging to the family Frenguelliidae.	
Nototriadophlebia	Gen. et sp. nov	Valid	Béthoux & Anderson	Late Triassic (Carnian)	Molteno Formation	South Africa	A member of Triadophlebiomorpha. The type species is N. pritykinae.	
Oxfordgomphus	Gen. et sp. nov	Valid	Huang & Nel in Huang et al.	Late Jurassic (Oxfordian)	Yangshuzhuang Formation	China	A dragonfly belonging to epiproctophoran stem group of Anisoptera, possibly a member of the family Juragomphidae. The type species is O. trescellulae.	
Palaeophylolestes	Gen. et sp. nov	Valid	Doriath-Döhler, Hervet & Béthoux	Paleocene	Menat Basin	France	A damselfly belonging to the family Synlestidae. The type species is P. distinctus.	
Parasinitsia	Gen. et sp. nov	Valid	Tian et al.	Middle Jurassic (Aalenian)	Yanan Formation	China	A member of Odonata belonging to the superfamily Isophlebioidea and the family Campterophlebiidae. The type species is P. qingyunensis.	
Permagrion sharovi	Sp. nov	Valid	Felker	Permian		Russia	A protozygopteran belonging to the family Permagrionidae. Published online in 2024, but the issue date is listed as December 2023.	
Permolestes obscurus	Sp. nov	Valid	Felker	Permian		Russia	A protozygopteran belonging to the family Permagrionidae. Published online in 2024, but the issue date is listed as December 2023.	
Permolestes vjatkensis	Sp. nov	Valid	Felker	Permian		Russia	A protozygopteran belonging to the family Permagrionidae. Published online in 2024, but the issue date is listed as December 2023.	
Permosticta	Gen. et 2 sp. nov	Valid	Felker	Permian		Russia	A protozygopteran belonging to the family Voltzialestidae. Genus includes new species P. elegans and P. parva. Published online in 2024, but the issue date is listed as December 2023.	
Prototerskeja	Gen. et sp. nov	Valid	Felker	Permian		Russia	A protozygopteran belonging to the family Voltzialestidae. The type species is P. dubia. Published online in 2024, but the issue date is listed as December 2023.	
Pseudocymatophlebia bisecta	Sp. nov		Yang, Ren & Shi	Early Cretaceous	Yixian Formation	China	An Aktassiid Petalurida dragonfly.	
Pseudopalaeodysagrion	Gen. et comb. nov	Valid	Bechly & Velten	Cretaceous	Burmese amber	Myanmar	A damselfly; a new genus for "Palaeodysagrion" youlini Zheng, Chang & Chang (2017).	
Salagoulestes martynovi	Sp. nov	Valid	Felker	Permian		Russia	A protozygopteran belonging to the family Permagrionidae. Published online in 2024, but the issue date is listed as December 2023.	
Solikamptilon aequus	Sp. nov	Valid	Felker	Permian		Russia	A protozygopteran belonging to the family Permagrionidae. Published online in 2024, but the issue date is listed as December 2023.	
Sushkinia angulata	Sp. nov	Valid	Felker	Permian		Russia	A protozygopteran belonging to the family Permagrionidae. Published online in 2024, but the issue date is listed as December 2023.	
Tenebragrion tynskyi	Sp. nov	Valid	Nel, Palazzo & Aase	Eocene	Green River Formation	United States (Wyoming)	A damselfly belonging to the family Dysagrionidae.	
Triadolestes	Gen. et 2 sp. nov	Valid	Felker	Permian		Russia	A protozygopteran belonging to the family Permagrionidae. Genus includes new species T. sakmarensis and T. mutovkensis. Published online in 2024, but the issue date is listed as December 2023.	
Turanopteron sinensis	Sp. nov	Valid	Huang & Nel in Huang et al.	Late Jurassic (Oxfordian)	Yangshuzhuang Formation	China	A dragonfly belonging to epiproctophoran stem group of Anisoptera.	

==== Odonatopteran research ====
- A study on trends in morphological diversity of Permian to Jurassic members of Odonata is published by Deregnaucourt et al. (2023), who report evidence of decreasing morphological diversity through time in spite of increasing species richness, as well evidence of significant changes in morphological diversity at the Permian-Triassic and Triassic-Jurassic transitions.
- Qi et al. (2023) describe new fossil material of Sinomesuropetala daohugensis from the Haifanggou Formation (China), providing new information on the forewing characters of this species and confirming its close relationship with Mesuropetala.

=== Other palaeopterans ===
Name	Novelty	Status	Authors	Age	Type locality	Country	Notes	Images
Microhymen	Gen. et sp. nov		Yang, Ren & Béthoux	Carboniferous (Pennsylvanian)		China	A member of Megasecopteromorpha belonging to the family Bardohymenidae. The type species is M. inconspicuus.	

== Clade †Paoliidea ==
=== †Paoliida ===
Name	Novelty	Status	Authors	Age	Type locality	Location	Notes	Images
Carbonidelia	Gen. et sp. nov	Valid	Nel, Garrouste & Jouault	Carboniferous (Gzhelian)		France	The type species is C. gallica.	
Simplexpaolia	Gen. et sp. nov	Valid	Santos et al.	Late Carboniferous		Spain	A member of the family Paoliidae. Genus includes new species S. prokopi. Announced in 2022; the final article version was published in 2023.	

== Clade Paraneoptera ==
=== Hemipterans ===
==== Auchenorrhyncha ====
Name	Novelty	Status	Authors	Age	Type locality	Location	Notes	Images
Afropereboria	Gen. et sp. nov	Valid	Nel et al.	Permian (Wordian)	Abrahamskraal Formation	South Africa	A cicada-like hemipteran belonging to the group Prosbolopsemorpha and the family Pereboriidae. The type species is A. magnifica.	
Amphignokachinia	Gen. et sp. nov	Valid	Brysz & Szwedo in Brysz, Müller & Szwedo	Late Cretaceous (Cenomanian)	Burmese amber	Myanmar	A planthopper belonging to the family Achilidae. The type species is A. subversa.	
Araeoanasillus	Gen. et sp. nov	Disputed	Poinar & Brown	Cretaceous	Burmese amber	Myanmar	A froghopper, possibly a member of the family Sinoalidae. The type species is A. leptosomus. Chen et al. (2024) considered Araeoanasillus to be a junior synonym of the sinoalid genus Cretadorus, though the authors maintained A. leptosomus as a distinct species within the latter genus.	
Archerythrogonia	Gen. et sp. nov	Valid	Dietrich & Perkovsky	Eocene (Ypresian)	Fur Formation	Denmark	A leafhopper belonging to the subfamily Cicadellinae. The type species is A. furensis.	
Cheiloceps arachnophila	Sp. nov	Valid	Dietrich, Williams & Heads	Miocene	Dominican amber	Dominican Republic	A species of Cheiloceps.	
Cheiloceps magnifrons	Sp. nov	Valid	Gnezdilov, Sun & Perkovsky	Miocene	Dominican amber	Dominican Republic	A species of Cheiloceps.	
Cicada tithonus	Sp. nov	Valid	Moulds, Kaulfuss & Gehler	Pliocene (Piacenzian)		Germany	A species of Cicada.	
Dumpyawnus	Gen. et sp. nov		Zhang, Luo & Szwedo in Zhang et al.	Cretaceous	Burmese amber	Myanmar	A planthopper belonging to the family Katlasidae. The type species is D. hpungwanus.	
Duraznoscytinum	Gen. et sp. nov	Valid	Lara, Cariglino & Zavattieri	Late Triassic	Potrerillos Formation	Argentina	A member of Cicadomorpha belonging to the family Scytinopteridae. The type species is D. aristovi.	
Dysmorphoptila gobiensis	Sp. nov	In press	Zhang et al.	Early Jurassic	Badaowan Formation	China	A member of the family Dysmorphoptilidae.	
Eodikraneura	Gen. et sp. nov	Valid	Dietrich, Simutnik & Perkovsky	Eocene	Rovno amber	Ukraine	A leafhopper belonging to the subfamily Typhlocybinae and the tribe Dikraneurini. The type species is E. obscura.	
Guchinus	Gen. et sp. nov	In press	Zhang et al.	Early Jurassic	Badaowan Formation	China	A member of the family Dysmorphoptilidae. Genus includes new species G. xinjiangensis.	
Jantarineura	Gen. et sp. nov	Valid	Gębicki, Walczak & Świerczewski in Gębicki et al.	Eocene	Baltic amber	Europe (Baltic Sea region)	A leafhopper belonging to the subfamily Typhlocybinae and the tribe Protodikraneurini. The type species is J. serafini.	
Karamayojassus	Gen. et sp. nov		Chen et al.	Early Jurassic	Badaowan Formation	China	A leafhopper belonging to the family Archijassidae. The type species is K. xinjiangensis.	
Karooprosbole	Gen. et sp. nov	Valid	Nel & Prevec	Permian (Wordian)	Abrahamskraal Formation	South Africa	A member of Cicadomorpha, probably belonging to the family Prosbolidae. The type species is K. magnifica.	
Magnicercopis	Gen. et sp. nov	Valid	Zhang, Chen & Zhang in Zhang et al.	Early Jurassic	Sangonghe Formation	China	A member of the family Procercopidae. The type species is M. pingi. Published online in 2024, but the issue date is listed as December 2023.	
Nolectra	Gen. et sp. nov		Luo et al.	Cretaceous	Burmese amber	Myanmar	A planthopper belonging to the family Nogodinidae. The type species is N. bourgoini.	
Protoparallaxis	Gen. et sp. nov	Valid	Dietrich, Simutnik & Perkovsky	Eocene	Rovno amber	Ukraine	A leafhopper belonging to the subfamily Typhlocybinae and the tribe Protodikraneurini. The type species is P. clavata.	
Pseudostenovicia	Gen. et sp. nov		Tang et al.	Permian		Australia	A member of Scytinopteroidea belonging to the family Stenoviciidae. The type species is P. evansi.	
Retrorsotettix	Gen. et sp. nov	Valid	Dietrich, Simutnik & Perkovsky	Eocene	Rovno amber	Ukraine	A leafhopper belonging to the subfamily Typhlocybinae and the tribe Protodikraneurini. The type species is R. vlaskini.	
Rovnodikra	Gen. et sp. nov	Valid	Dietrich, Simutnik & Perkovsky	Eocene	Rovno amber	Ukraine	A leafhopper belonging to the subfamily Typhlocybinae and the tribe Dikraneurini. The type species is R. longipes.	
Sinosurijikocixius	Gen. et sp. nov		Zhang et al.	Middle Triassic	Tongchuan Formation	China	A planthopper belonging to the family Surijokocixiidae. The type species is S. tongchuanensis.	
Tibicina boulardi	Sp. nov	Valid	Moulds, Kaulfuss & Gehler	Pliocene (Piacenzian)		Germany	A species of Tibicina.	
Tibicina lata	Sp. nov	Valid	Moulds, Kaulfuss & Gehler	Pliocene (Piacenzian)		Germany	A species of Tibicina.	
Vetusala	Gen. et sp. nov	Valid	Fu & Huang	Middle Triassic	Yanchang Formation	China	A member of Cicadomorpha belonging to the family Hylicellidae. The type species is V. maculata.	
Worako	Gen. et sp. nov	Valid	Stroiński, Ross & Szwedo	Eocene	Bembridge Marls	United Kingdom	A planthopper belonging to the family Ricaniidae. The type species is W. yulei.	

==== Coleorrhyncha ====
Name	Novelty	Status	Authors	Age	Type locality	Location	Notes	Images
Cicadocoris henanensis	Sp. nov	Valid	Xu & Huang	Middle Jurassic (Callovian)	Yangshuzhuang Formation	China	A member of the family Progonocimicidae.	

==== Heteroptera ====
Name	Novelty	Status	Authors	Age	Type locality	Location	Notes	Images
Archemezira	Gen. et 2 sp. nov	Valid	Heiss & Chen	Cretaceous	Burmese amber	Myanmar	A member of the family Aradidae. The type species is A. nuoxichenae; genus also includes A. nuoyichenae Heiss & Chen.	
Balticranocapsus	Gen. et sp. nov	Valid	Kim, Taszakowski & Jung	Eocene	Baltic amber	Europe (Baltic Sea region, Poland or Russia)	A member of the family Miridae belonging to the subfamily Deraeocorinae. The type species is B. aleksanderi.	
Birmaniaespina	Gen. et sp. nov		Yu, Chen & An	Cretaceous	Burmese amber	Myanmar	A member of the family Yuripopovinidae. The type species is B. robustispina.	
Brevipronotum	Gen. et sp. nov		Azar & Huang	Cretaceous	Burmese amber	Myanmar	A member of the family Cydnidae belonging to the subfamily Amnestinae. The type species is B. neli.	
Buryatocera	Gen. et sp. nov		Ryzhkova, Yao & Kopylov	Early Cretaceous		Russia (Buryatia)	A member of Pentatomomorpha belonging to the family Kobdocoridae. Genus includes new species B. beta.	
Calisiomorpha herczeki	Sp. nov	Valid	Heiss	Cretaceous	Burmese amber	Myanmar	A member of the family Aradidae.	
Cretanabis	Gen. et sp. nov	Valid	Kim et al.	Cretaceous	Burmese amber	Myanmar	A member of the family Nabidae. The type species is C. kerzhneri.	
Cretozemira	Gen. et sp. nov	Valid	Heiss	Cretaceous	Burmese amber	Myanmar	A member of the family Aradidae, possibly belonging to the subfamily Archearadinae. The type species is C. elongata.	
Deraeocoris gorczycai	Sp. nov	Valid	Kim, Taszakowski & Jung	Eocene	Baltic amber	Europe (Baltic Sea region, Poland or Russia)	A species of Deraeocoris.	
Ecpaglocoris	Gen. et sp. nov	Valid	Yamada & Yamamoto in Yamada, Yamamoto & Takahashi	Cretaceous (Cenomanian)	Burmese amber	Myanmar	A vetanthocorid cimicoid. The type species is E. ditomeus.	
Electroderaeous	Gen. et sp. nov	Valid	Taszakowski & Kim in Taszakowski et al.	Miocene	Dominican amber	Dominican Republic	A member of the family Miridae belonging to the subfamily Deraeocorinae. The type species is E. crassicornis.	
Eocenogeocoris	Gen. et comb. nov	Valid	Kóbor in Kóbor, Faúndez & Roca-Cusachs	Eocene (Priabonian)	Florissant Formation	United States; Colorado	A big eyed bug. The type species is "Geocoris" infernorum Scudder (1890).	Eocenogeocoris infernorum
Extralapis	Gen. et 2 sp. nov		Ryzhkova, Yao & Kopylov	Early Cretaceous		Russia (Buryatia)	A member of Pentatomomorpha belonging to the family Kobdocoridae. Genus includes new species E. carens and E. breviscutum.	
Feroculipodus	Gen. et sp. nov		Ma, Ren & Yao in Ma et al.	Cretaceous	Burmese amber	Myanmar	A member of the family Nabidae belonging to the subfamily Prostemmatinae. The type species is F. obtusidentatus.	
Ilyocoris andancensis	Sp. nov	Valid	Jattiot et al.	Miocene		France	A species of Ilyocoris.	
Khasoris	Gen. et sp. nov		Ryzhkova, Yao & Kopylov	Early Cretaceous		Russia (Buryatia)	A member of Pentatomomorpha belonging to the family Kobdocoridae. Genus includes new species K. yuripopovi.	
Longivelia	Gen. et sp. nov		Zhang et al.	Cretaceous	Burmese amber	Myanmar	A member of the family Veliidae belonging to the subfamily Ocelloveliinae. Genus includes new species L. circuliplsus.	
Macrolepta	Gen. et sp. nov		Yu, Zhuo & Chen in Yu et al.	Late Cretaceous (Cenomanian)	Burmese amber	Myanmar	A member of the family Leptopodidae belonging to the subfamily Leptosaldinae. The type species is M. chenchenae.	
Metoisops michalskii	Sp. nov	Valid	Kim, Taszakowski & Herczek in Kim et al.	Eocene	Baltic amber	Poland	A member of the family Miridae belonging to the subfamily Isometopinae and the tribe Gigantometopini.	
Metoisops popovi	Sp. nov	Valid	Kim, Taszakowski & Jung in Kim et al.	Eocene	Baltic amber	Europe (Baltic sea region, Poland or Russia)	A member of the family Miridae belonging to the subfamily Isometopinae and the tribe Gigantometopini.	
Myanmarvelia	Gen. et sp. nov	Valid	Boderau et al.	Cretaceous	Burmese amber	Myanmar	A member of the family Mesoveliidae. The type species is M. pankowskiorum.	
Oligoptilomera	Gen. et sp. nov	Valid	Nel et al.	Oligocene (Rupelian)		France	A Ptilomerinae water strider. The type species is O. luberonensis.	Oligoptilomera luberonensis
Parvilepta	Gen. et 2 sp. nov		Yu, Zhuo & Chen in Yu et al.	Late Cretaceous (Cenomanian)	Burmese amber	Myanmar	A member of the family Leptopodidae belonging to the subfamily Leptosaldinae. Genus includes P. jinghuiae and P. jingyuanae.	
Protogeocoris	Gen. et sp. nov	Valid	Kóbor, Faúndez & Roca-Cusachs	Cretaceous (Cenomanian)	Burmese amber	Myanmar	A big eyed bug. The type species is P. arcanus.	
Tetrapentatoma	Gen. et sp. nov		Aiba, Souma & Takahashi	Pliocene	Motojuku Group	Japan	A member of the family Pentatomidae. The type species is T. nishizawai.	

==== Sternorrhyncha ====
Name	Novelty	Status	Authors	Age	Type locality	Location	Notes	Images
Adocimycolus	Fam. et gen. et sp. nov	Valid	Poinar & Vega	Cretaceous (Albian to Cenomanian)	Burmese amber	Myanmar	A member of Coccoidea; the type genus of the new family Adocimycolidae. The type species is A. aarondavisii.	
Paraprotopsyllidium shouchangense	Sp. nov		Hakim & Huang in Hakim et al.	Early Cretaceous (Barremian)	Shouchang Formation	China	A member of Protopsyllidioidea belonging to the family Paraprotopsyllidiidae.	
Poljanka curticapillata	Sp. nov	Valid	Lü, Luo & Yao in Lü et al.	Middle Jurassic	Jiulongshan Formation	China	A member of the family Protopsyllidiidae.	
Sinopsocus yananensis	Sp. nov	Valid	Xu, Hakim & Huang	Middle Jurassic	Yanan Formation	China	A protopsyllidiid.	
Snotra herczeki	Sp. nov	Valid	Drohojowska & Szwedo in Drohojowska et al.	Eocene	Baltic amber	Europe (Gdańsk Bay region)	A whitefly.	
Subaphidulum sinica	Sp. nov	Valid	Xu, Hakim & Huang	Middle Jurassic	Yanan Formation	China	A protopsyllidiid.	

==== Hemipteran research ====
- Fossil material of a member of the genus Aphelocheirus, representing the oldest record of the family Aphelocheiridae reported to date, is described from the Lower Eocene Palana Formation (Rajasthan, India) by Patel et al. (2023).
- New fossil material of the archijassid species Kisa fasciata is described from the Jurassic Yangshuzhuang and Yan'an formations (China) by Fu et al. (2023), expanding known distribution of Archijassidae in Eurasia and providing evidence of a considerable intraspecific variation of K. fasciata.

=== Psocodea ===
Name	Novelty	Status	Authors	Age	Type locality	Location	Notes	Images
Azarpsocus anjana	Sp. nov		Álvarez-Parra & Nel in Álvarez-Parra et al.	Early Cretaceous (Albian)		Spain	A member of the family Manicapsocidae.	
Burmacompsocus ojancano	Sp. nov		Álvarez-Parra & Nel in Álvarez-Parra et al.	Early Cretaceous (Albian)		Spain	A member of the family Compsocidae.	
Paralellopsocus	Gen. et sp. nov		Hakim, Huang & Azar	Cretaceous	Burmese amber	Myanmar	A member of the family Empheriidae. The type species is P. elongatus.	
Paramanicapsocus xingyuei	Sp. nov	Valid	Liang in Chen, Wang & Liang	Late Cretaceous (Cenomanian)	Burmese amber	Myanmar	A member of the family Manicapsocidae.	

=== Thysanoptera ===
Name	Novelty	Status	Authors	Age	Type locality	Location	Notes	Images
Pseudoundacypha	Gen. et sp. nov	Valid	Huang	Middle Jurassic	Yanan Formation	China	A thrips belonging to the group Lophioneurida. The type species is P. yananensis.	

== Clade Perlidea ==
=== Dermapterans ===
==== New dermapteran taxa ====
Name	Novelty	Status	Authors	Age	Type locality	Location	Notes	Images
Applanatiforceps	Gen. et sp. nov	Valid	Yin et al.	Middle Jurassic	Jiulongshan Formation	China	A member of the family Protodiplatyidae. The type species is A. angustus.	
Ekpagloderma	Gen. et sp. nov	Valid	Yin et al.	Middle Jurassic	Jiulongshan Formation	China	A member of the family Semenoviolidae. The type species is E. gracilentum.	
Ikelus	Gen. et sp. nov		Estrada-Álvarez & Núñez-Bazán in Estrada-Álvarez et al.	Miocene	Mexican amber	Mexico	A spongiphorid earwig. The type species is I. nuxibus.	
Marava antiqua	Sp. nov		Estrada-Álvarez & Núñez-Bazán in Estrada-Álvarez et al.	Miocene	Mexican amber	Mexico	A species of Marava.	
Marava brevicauda	Sp. nov		Estrada-Álvarez & Núñez-Bazán in Estrada-Álvarez et al.	Miocene	Mexican amber	Mexico	A species of Marava.	
Vostox engeli	Sp. nov		Estrada-Álvarez & Núñez-Bazán in Estrada-Álvarez et al.	Miocene	Mexican amber	Mexico	A species of Vostox.	

==== Dermapteran research ====
- Evidence from new immature earwig specimens from the Cretaceous amber from Myanmar, interpreted as indicative of reduction of morphological diversity of grasping apparatuses of earwigs over the past 100 million years, is presented by Haug et al. (2023).

=== Embiopterans ===
Name	Novelty	Status	Authors	Age	Type locality	Location	Notes	Images
Perissoclothoda	Gen. et sp. nov	Valid	Chen & Zhang	Late Cretaceous (Cenomanian)	Burmese amber	Myanmar	A member of the family Clothodidae. The type species is P. myrrhokaris.	

=== Plecopterans ===
Name	Novelty	Status	Authors	Age	Type locality	Location	Notes	Images
Cavoperla	Fam. et gen. et sp. nov		Chen	Cretaceous	Burmese amber	Myanmar	A member of Arctoperlaria belonging to the superfamily Pteronarcyoidea and to the new family Cavoperlidae. Genus includes new species C. excavata.	
Dewaltoperla	Gen. et sp. nov		Chen	Cretaceous	Burmese amber	Myanmar	A member of Arctoperlaria belonging to the family Peltoperlidae and the subfamily Borisoperlinae. Genus includes new species D. edwardi.	
Talbragaria	Gen. et sp. nov	Valid	Sroka & Prokop	Late Jurassic	Talbragar fossil site	Australia	A member of the family Notonemouridae. The type species is T. australis.	
Triassonemoura	Gen. et sp. nov	Valid	Sinitshenkova	Triassic	Madygen Formation	Kyrgyzstan	A member of the family Perlariopseidae. The type species is T. ficteramosa.	

== Other insects ==
Name	Novelty	Status	Authors	Age	Type locality	Location	Notes	Images
Aristovia	Fam. et gen. et sp. nov	Valid	Storozhenko & Gröhn	Late Cretaceous (Cenomanian)	Burmese amber	Myanmar	A member of Polyneoptera belonging to the group Grylloblattida; the type genus of the new family Aristoviidae. The type species is A. daniili.	
Aristoviblattogryllus	Gen. et comb. nov	Valid	Cui et al.	Jurassic	Daohugou Beds	China	A member of Polyneoptera belonging to the group Blattogryllopterida; a new genus for "Plesioblattogryllus" minor Ren & Aristov (2011).	
Artinska glanensis	Sp. nov		Poschmann, Nel & Raisch	Permian	Meisenheim Formation	Germany	A grylloblattidan.	
Ensiferoblatta	Fam. et gen. et sp. nov	Valid	Li & Huang	Cretaceous	Burmese amber	Myanmar	A member of "Eoblattodea" (paraphyletic grouping of cockroach-like insects related to dictyopterans), the type genus of the new family Ensiferoblattidae. The type species is E. oecanthoides.	
Ideliopsina aristovi	Sp. nov	Valid	Oyama et al.	Late Triassic	Momonoki Formation	Japan	A member of Polyneoptera belonging to the group Grylloblattida and the family Ideliidae.	
Mesoidelia rasnitsyni	Sp. nov	Valid	Aristov	Middle–Late Triassic	Madygen Formation	Kyrgyzstan	A member of Polyneoptera belonging to the group Eoblattida and the family Mesorthopteridae.	
Oborella moschelensis	Sp. nov		Poschmann, Nel & Raisch	Permian	Meisenheim Formation	Germany	A grylloblattidan.	
Permosialis martynovae	Sp. nov	Valid	Aristov & Rasnitsyn	Permian		Russia (Arkhangelsk Oblast)	A member of Palaeomanteida (Miomoptera) belonging to the family Permosialidae.	
Permosialis postuma	Sp. nov	Valid	Aristov & Rasnitsyn	Permian		Mongolia	A member of Palaeomanteida (Miomoptera) belonging to the family Permosialidae.	
Permosialis virgata	Sp. nov	Valid	Aristov & Rasnitsyn	Permian		Mongolia	A member of Palaeomanteida (Miomoptera) belonging to the family Permosialidae.	
Permosialis vizzya	Sp. nov	Valid	Aristov & Rasnitsyn	Permian		Russia	A member of Palaeomanteida (Miomoptera) belonging to the family Permosialidae.	
Plesioblattogryllus aristovi	Sp. nov	Valid	Huang & Nel	Jurassic	Daohugou Beds	China	A member of Polyneoptera belonging to the family Plesioblattogryllidae (reestablished as distinct from the family Blattogryllidae).	
Proceroblatta	Gen. et sp. nov	Valid	Li & Huang	Cretaceous	Burmese amber	Myanmar	A member of "Eoblattodea" of uncertain affinities. The type species is P. colossea.	
Progonoblattina clarkii	Comb. nov	Valid	(Scudder)	Carboniferous (Moscovian)		United States (Rhode Island)	A stem-dictyopteran belonging to the family Gyroblattidae. Moved from Etoblattina clarkii Scudder (1893).	

- Khramov, Foraponova & Węgierek (2023) describe specimens of Tillyardembia from the Permian locality Chekarda (Perm Krai, Russia) preserved with pollen on their heads, thoraces, legs and abdomens, representing the oldest record of pollen-bearing insects reported to date.
- Haug et al. (2023) describe a holometabolan larva (probably a new specimen of ?Partisaniferus edjarzembowskii) from the Cretaceous Burmese amber, preserved with the mouthparts forming a beak and with a large and inflated trunk, and interpret the studied larva as physogastric and possibly living in confined spaces inside wood.

== General research ==
- A study on the taxonomic diversity of insects throughout the Permian and Triassic, providing evidence of more than one extinction events accompanied by significant diversity drop and faunal turnovers, is published by Gui, Liu & Tian (2023).
- Solórzano‑Kraemer et al. (2023) report the preservation of phorid flies (but not fly larvae) associated with the holotype of Oculudentavis naga from the Cretaceous Myanmar amber, and interpret this finding as preserving early stage of scavenging by flies; the authors also note that there is not evidence of scavenging by ants from the Myanmar amber, and interpret it as suggesting that the Cretaceous ants did not yet have a foraging strategy to search for vertebrate corpses and to eat carrion.
- Review of anti-predator strategies of holometabolan larvae from the Cretaceous ambert from Myanmar is published by Haug et al. (2023), who find evidence of repeated independent evolution of strategies employed by extant insects, and report the discovery of a new leaf-mining hymenopteran caterpillar and a hangingfly caterpillar with extensive spines.
- An assemblage of chironomid (referrable to extant subfamilies), mayfly and lepidopteran fossils, closer in composition to Cenozoic insect assemblages than to Mesozoic ones, is described from the Upper Cretaceous (Maastrichtian) Chorrillo Formation (Argentina) by Vera et al. (2023).
- A diverse insect assemblage, including representatives of the orders Coleoptera, Diptera, Hymenoptera, Orthoptera and Hemiptera, is described from the Miocene shales from Wang Kaew in the Mae Sot basin (Thailand) by Warapeang et al. (2023).
- Evidence from thermal maturation experiments on extant beetles, interpreted as indicating that colour patterns preserved in fossil insect specimens can be plausibly explained as biological in origin and represent melanin-based color patterns, is presented by Wang et al. (2023).
