= Proneuronema =

Proneuronema Temporal range: lutetian

Scientific classification
- Kingdom: Animalia
- Phylum: Arthropoda
- Class: Insecta
- Order: Neuroptera
- Family: Hemerobiidae
- Subfamily: Drepanepteryginae
- Genus: †Proneuronema; Makarkin et al, 2016

Species
- P. gradatum; P. minor; P. sidorchukae

Extinct genus of lacewings

Proneuronema is an extinct genus of lacewings in the neuropteran family Hemerobiidae known from fossils found in amber. The genus currently contains three species, P. gradatum and P. minor from Baltic amber and P. sidorchukae from Rovno amber. A Ypresian fossil from Washington state was initially also placed within the genus, having been moved from its original placement as Cretomerobius wehri, but was subsequently moved to the separate genus Archibaldia by Vladimir Makarkin (2023).

A 2024 study identified a new species, P. damzeni, from Rovno amber, and reassigned P. gradatum to Archibaldia densistriata.
