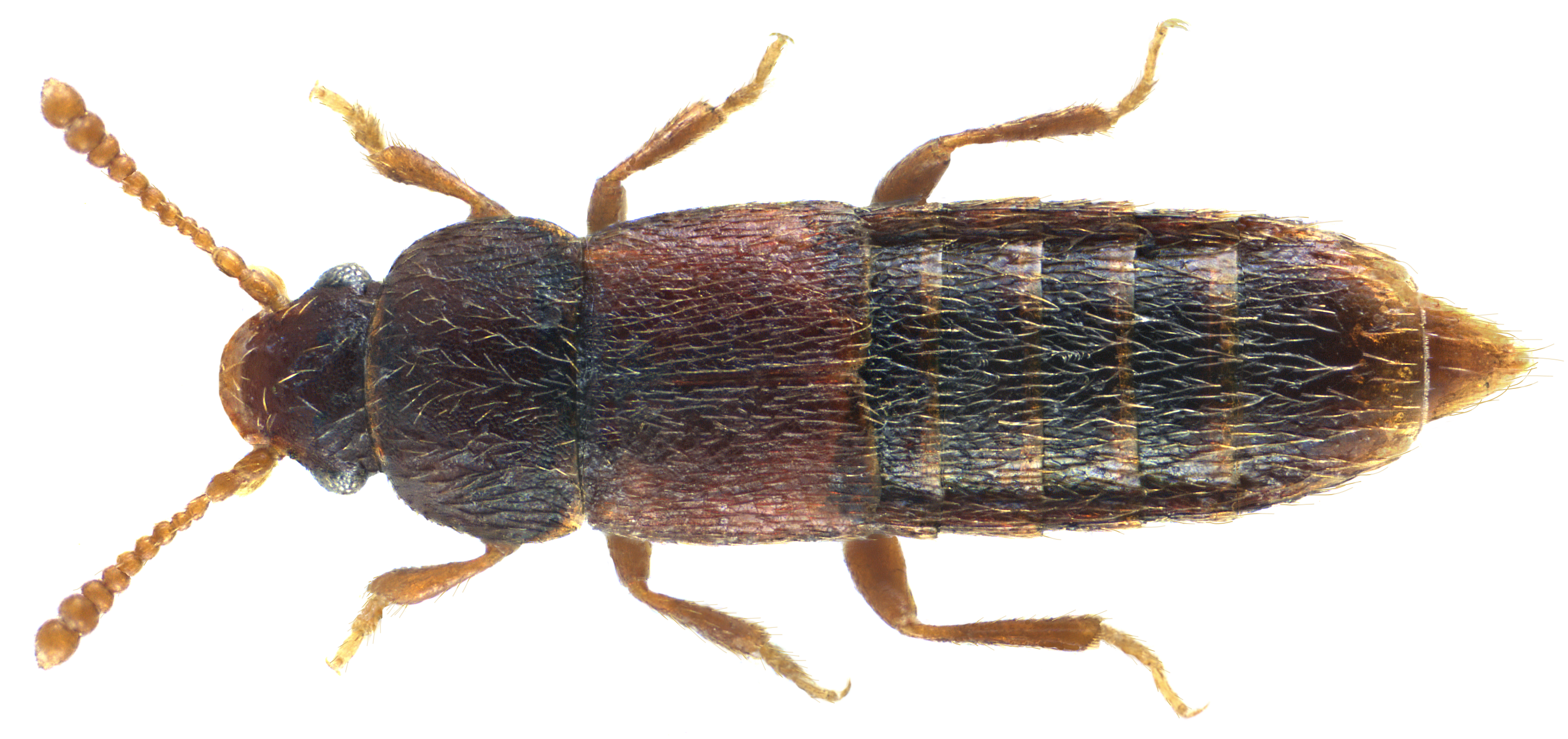
- Phloeocharis

Scientific classification
- Domain: Eukaryota
- Kingdom: Animalia
- Phylum: Arthropoda
- Class: Insecta
- Order: Coleoptera
- Suborder: Polyphaga
- Infraorder: Staphyliniformia
- Family: Staphylinidae
- Genus: Phloeocharis; Mannerheim, 1830

= Phloeocharis =

Genus of beetles

Phloeocharis is a genus of beetles belonging to the family Staphylinidae.

The species of this genus are found in Europe and Northern America.

Species:

- Phloeocharis acutangula Fauvel, 1898
- Phloeocharis agerata Chatzimanolis, Newton & Engel, 2013
