= Pastillus =

Scientific classification
- Kingdom: Animalia
- Phylum: Arthropoda
- Class: Insecta
- Order: Coleoptera
- Suborder: Polyphaga
- Infraorder: Cucujiformia
- Family: Nitidulidae
- Genus: Pastillus; Endrödy-Younga, 1962

Genus of beetles

Pastillus is a genus of Sap beetle.

== Species ==
- Pastillus eminentithorax Hisamatsu, 2013
