= Palaeomedeterus =

Palaeomedeterus Temporal range: Eocene, 37.2–33.9 Ma

Scientific classification
- Kingdom: Animalia
- Phylum: Arthropoda
- Class: Insecta
- Order: Diptera
- Family: Dolichopodidae
- Subfamily: Peloropeodinae
- Genus: †Palaeomedeterus; Meunier, 1895

Type species
- Tipula culiciforme Meunier, 1899

Synonyms
- Palaeochrysotus Meunier, 1907; Gheynia Meunier, 1899; Gheynius Meunier, 1907 (unjustified emendation)

Extinct genus of flies

Palaeomedeterus is an extinct genus of flies in the family Dolichopodidae, known from Baltic amber and Cambay amber from the Eocene. The genus was first proposed by Fernand Meunier in 1895 with no included species or description, though illustrations were provided for six different unnamed species (making the name Palaeomedeterus available according to the ICZN).

== Species ==
The genus includes the following species:

- †Palaeomedeterus bifurcatus (Meunier, 1907) (replacement name for Gheynia bifurcata) − Baltic amber, Russia, Eocene
- †Palaeomedeterus cambayensis Bickel in Bickel et al., 2022 − Cambay amber, India, Eocene
- †Palaeomedeterus concinnus (Meunier_{,} 1907) (replacement name for Chrysotus concinnus) - Baltic amber, Europe, Eocene
- †Palaeomedeterus fessus (Meunier, 1907) − Baltic amber, Russia, Eocene
- †Palaeomedeterus hirsutus (Meunier, 1907) − Baltic amber, Russia, Eocene
- †Palaeomedeterus horridus (Meunier, 1907) − Baltic amber, Russia, Eocene
- †Palaeomedeterus ignavus (Meunier, 1907) − Baltic amber, Russia, Eocene
- †Palaeomedeterus languidus (Meunier, 1907) − Baltic amber, Russia, Eocene
- †Palaeomedeterus lassatus (Meunier, 1907) − Baltic amber, Russia, Eocene
- †Palaeomedeterus lentus (Meunier, 1907) − Baltic amber, Russia, Eocene
- †Palaeomedeterus meunieri Meuffels & Grootaert, 1999 (replacement name for Tipula culiciformis Meunier, 1899 nec Linnaeus, 1758) − Baltic amber, Eocene
- †Palaeomedeterus praeconcinnus (Evenhuis, 1994) − Baltic amber, Russia, Eocene
- †Palaeomedeterus tertiarius (Meunier, 1907) − Baltic amber, Russia, Eocene
