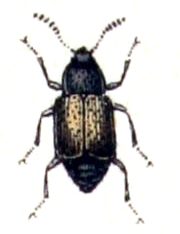
- Proteinus brachypterus

Scientific classification
- Kingdom: Animalia
- Phylum: Arthropoda
- Class: Insecta
- Order: Coleoptera
- Suborder: Polyphaga
- Infraorder: Staphyliniformia
- Family: Staphylinidae
- Genus: Proteinus; Latreille, 1796

= Proteinus =

Genus of beetles

Proteinus is a genus of beetles belonging to the family Staphylinidae.

The species of this genus are found in Europe, Japan and America.

Species:

- Proteinus abditus Assing, 2007
- Proteinus acadiensis Klimaszewski, 2005
