= Cretoloricera =

Cretoloricera Temporal range: Early/Lower Cenomanian

Scientific classification
- Kingdom: Animalia
- Phylum: Arthropoda
- Class: Insecta
- Order: Coleoptera
- Suborder: Adephaga
- Family: Carabidae
- Genus: Cretoloricera; H. Liu, K. V. Makarov, and C. H. Luo, 2023
- Species: C. electra

Binomial name
- Cretoloricera electra H. Liu, K. V. Makarov, and C. H. Luo, 2023

Fossil genus of beetles in the family Carabidae

Cretoloricera is a genus of ground beetles (Carabidae) that lived during the Middle Cretaceous period. The genus currently only has one known species which is Cretoloricera electra, found in Kachin amber, dated to the mid-Cretaceous. The genus morphology has a strong and robust maxilla and a highly modified galea. It had a nasal with prominent teeth and lack lacinia.
