= Cretevania =

Cretevania Temporal range: Cretaceous

Scientific classification
- Kingdom: Animalia
- Phylum: Arthropoda
- Class: Insecta
- Order: Hymenoptera
- Family: Evaniidae
- Genus: †Cretevania; Rasnitsyn, 1975

Species
- see text

Synonyms
- Genus-level: Eovernevania Deans, 2004; Procretevania Zhang & Zhang, 2000; Species-level: Eovernevania cyrtocerca Deans, 2004; Procretevania pristina Zhang & Zhang, 2000; Procretevania vesca Zhang, Rasnitsyn, Wang & Zhang, 2007; Procretevania exquisita Zhang, Rasnitsyn, Wang & Zhang, 2007

Extinct genus of wasps

Cretevania is an extinct genus of Evaniidae, which lived in what is now China, Burma, England, Lebanon, Mongolia, Russia and Spain during the Cretaceous period. the genus was described by Rasnitsyn in 1975, and the type species is Cretevania minor.

== Species ==
- Cretevania alcalai Peñalver et al., 2010
- Cretevania orgonomecorum
- Cretevania alonsoi Peñalver et al., 2010
- Cretevania bechlyi Jennings, Krogmann & Mew, 2013
- Cretevania concordia Rasnitsyn, Jarzembowski & Ross, 1998
- Cretevania cyrtocerca (Deans, 2004) Peñalver et al., 2010
- Cretevania exquisita (Zhang, Rasnitsyn, Wang & Zhang, 2007) Peñalver et al., 2010
- Cretevania major Rasnitsyn, 1975
- Cretevania meridionalis Rasnitsyn, 1991
- Cretevania minor Rasnitsyn, 1975 (type)
- Cretevania minuta Rasnitsyn, 1975
- Cretevania montoyai Peñalver et al., 2010
- Cretevania pristina (Zhang & Zhang, 2000) Peñalver et al., 2010
- Cretevania rubusensis Peñalver et al., 2010
- Cretevania tenuis Li et al., 2018
- Cretevania venae Li et al., 2018
- Cretevania vesca (Zhang et al., 2007) Peñalver et al., 2010

== Phylogeny ==
Cladogram after Peñalver et al. (2010).

- Evanioidea
  - Praeaulacinae
  - - Evaniops
    - Evanigaster
  - Cretocleistogastrinae
  - Andrenelia
  - Sorellevania
  - - Baissinae
    - - Aulacinae
      - - Kotujellitinae
        - Gesteruptiinae
  - - Lebanevania
    - Mesevania
  - - Protoparevania
    - - Grimaldivania
      - - Iberoevania
        - - Newjersevania
          - - Eoevania
            - Vernevania
            - Acanthinevania
            - Trissevania
            - Cretevania
              - Eovernevania (syn., Lebanon specimens)
              - - Procretevania (syn., Chinese specimens)
                - Cretevania
