= Pachycondyla aberrans =

Pachycondyla aberrans Temporal range: Priabonian

Scientific classification
- Domain: Eukaryota
- Kingdom: Animalia
- Phylum: Arthropoda
- Class: Insecta
- Order: Hymenoptera
- Family: Formicidae
- Genus: Pachycondyla
- Species: †P. aberrans

Binomial name
- †Pachycondyla aberrans Dlussky, Rasnitsyn & Perfilieva, 2015

Extinct species of ant

Pachycondyla aberrans is an extinct species of formicid in the ant subfamily Ponerinae known from a single fossil found in Russia.

== History and classification ==
P. aberrans is known from a single ant found in Russia. The specimen was described from a compression fossil preserved in diatomite deposits of the Bol’shaya Svetlovodnaya site. The site is exposed on the bank of Barachek Creek 3 km (1.9 mi) upstream from the creek's confluence with the Bol’shaya Svetlovodnaya River in the Pozharsky District, on the Pacific Coast of Russia. The fossil-bearing rocks preserve possibly Priabonian plants and animals which lived in and around a small lake near a volcano. The site has been attributed to either the Maksimovka or Salibez Formations and compared to the Bembridge Marls and Florissant Formation, both of which are Priabonian in age.

At the time of description, the holotype adult specimen, number PIN 3429/104 was preserved in the A. A. Borissiak Paleontological Institute collections, part of the Russian Academy of Sciences. The fossil was first described by the trio of paleomyrmecologists Gennady Dlussky, Alexandr Rasnitsyn and Ksenia Perfilieva. In the type description, Dlussky, Rasnitsyn and Perfilieva named the species P. aberrans, with the specific epithet derived the Latin aberrans meaning "aberrant" or "to deviate".

P. aberrans is one of two Pachycondyla species that were described by Dlussky, Rasnitsyn and Perfilieva from Bol’shaya Svetlovodnaya, the other species P. oligocenica being described from a male.

== Description ==
The incomplete adult of P. aberrans is missing its head and a portion of the gaster, making determination of its sex impossible, with male or a queen as possibilities. The preserved portions of the ant indicate a body length of 6–7 mm (0.24–0.28 in), with a tall petiole node between the thorax and the gaster. The forewing is also incomplete, with an estimated length of approximately 5.7 mm (0.22 in). The venation in the wings is reduced in development, with the rs-m cross vein not fully developed and enclosing the rm cell. The cell is present in forewing of P. oligocenica, distinguishing the two species.
