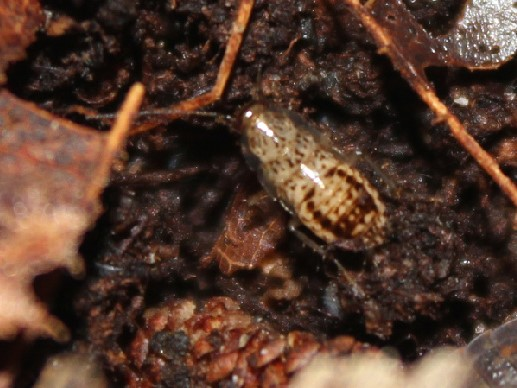
- Nymph

Scientific classification
- Kingdom: Animalia
- Phylum: Arthropoda
- Clade: Pancrustacea
- Class: Insecta
- Order: Blattodea
- Family: Ectobiidae
- Genus: Cariblatta
- Species: C. lutea

Binomial name
- Cariblatta lutea (Saussure & Zehntner, 1893)

Subspecies
- See Text

Synonyms
- Ceratinoptera lutea (Saussure & Zehntner, 1893)

= Cariblatta lutea =

Species of cockroach

Cariblatta lutea is a small species of cockroach native to the United States and other countries, measuring usually around 7 millimeters long as an adult and under 2 millimeters from head tip to abdomen tip at the 1st instar or hatchling. It consists of two subspecies, the small yellow cockroach (Cariblatta lutea lutea), and the least yellow cockroach (Cariblatta lutea minima).

The ootheca, or egg case, of C. lutea has been suggested as a possible host of an ensign wasp, Hyptia floridana.

== Subspecies ==
There are two identified subspecies of Cariblatta lutea: Cariblatta lutea lutea (Saussure & Zehntner 1893) and Cariblatta lutea minima Hebard 1916. Habitat differences and the broad overlap in distribution of the two subspecies in peninsular Florida have prompted the suggestion that they may warrant recognition as distinct species.

== Description ==
Cariblatta lutea lutea is a pale brownish-yellow, with a pale brown head, a band between the eyes, and usually some dark brown spots on the face. The disc of the pronotum (head shield) is usually marked with several small brownish spots, and its sides are transparent. The tegmina (leathery forewings) typically don't quite reach the apex of the abdomen. The tegmina of males are stinctly shorter than those of females, and the tips of the tegmina are rounded on females. The subgenital plate of the between the styles of the male is three times as long as it is broad. In females, the subgenital plate is large and boat-shaped with a rounded apex. Females of the subspecies tend to be larger than the males, with much shorter wings. Female body length ranges from 7.0–9.5 mm (0.28–0.37 in) compared to male body length from 5.8–8.1 mm (0.23–0.32 in). Female pronotum length ranges from 2.2–2.6 mm (0.087–0.10 in) compared to male pronotum length from 1.8–2.1 mm (0.071–0.083 in).

Cariblatta lutea minima is on average smaller and has shorter tegmina than Cariblatta lutea lutea. Males of the C. l. minima subspecies also have shorter inner rudimentary wings, and a much narrower subgenital plate, than C. l. lutea. Males of C. l. minima are slightly smaller than females; the length of the body of males ranges from 5.4–7.7 mm (0.21–0.30 in), and the length of the pronotum of males ranges from 1.8–2.1 mm (0.071–0.083 in), while the body of females ranges from 5.8–8.0 mm (0.23–0.31 in), and the pronotum of females ranges from 2.0–2.3 mm (0.079–0.091 in).

== Etymology ==
The genus Cariblatta was named after the Carib people of the Caribbean. Blatta means “an insect who shuns light” in Latin, referring to cockroaches as well as moths and other insects. Lutea means yellow, saffron, if mud or clay, good for nothing in Latin.

== Distribution ==
Cariblatta lutea lutea is found in the coastal plains of the southeastern USA including Alabama, Florida, Georgia, Louisiana, Mississippi, North Carolina, South Carolina, Texas, and Virginia, as well as the island nation of Cuba.

Cariblatta lutea minima is documented only in Cuba and several counties of the state of Florida.

== Habitat ==
Cariblatta lutea lutea is found in leaf, grass, and pine needle litter in forests in the southeastern US. In Florida it is commonly found in a variety of plant communities in Florida, and has also been found in gopher burrows, disturbed areas, and near houses.

Cariblatta lutea minima is found in hardwood hammocks in southern peninsular Florida and in the Keys, in open pinelands in Dade County, and in a variety of scrub, flatwoods, and hammock plant communities in northeastern Florida. It has also been collected in Spartina marshes, and sawgrass marshes, and in grasses behind beaches.

== Additional images ==
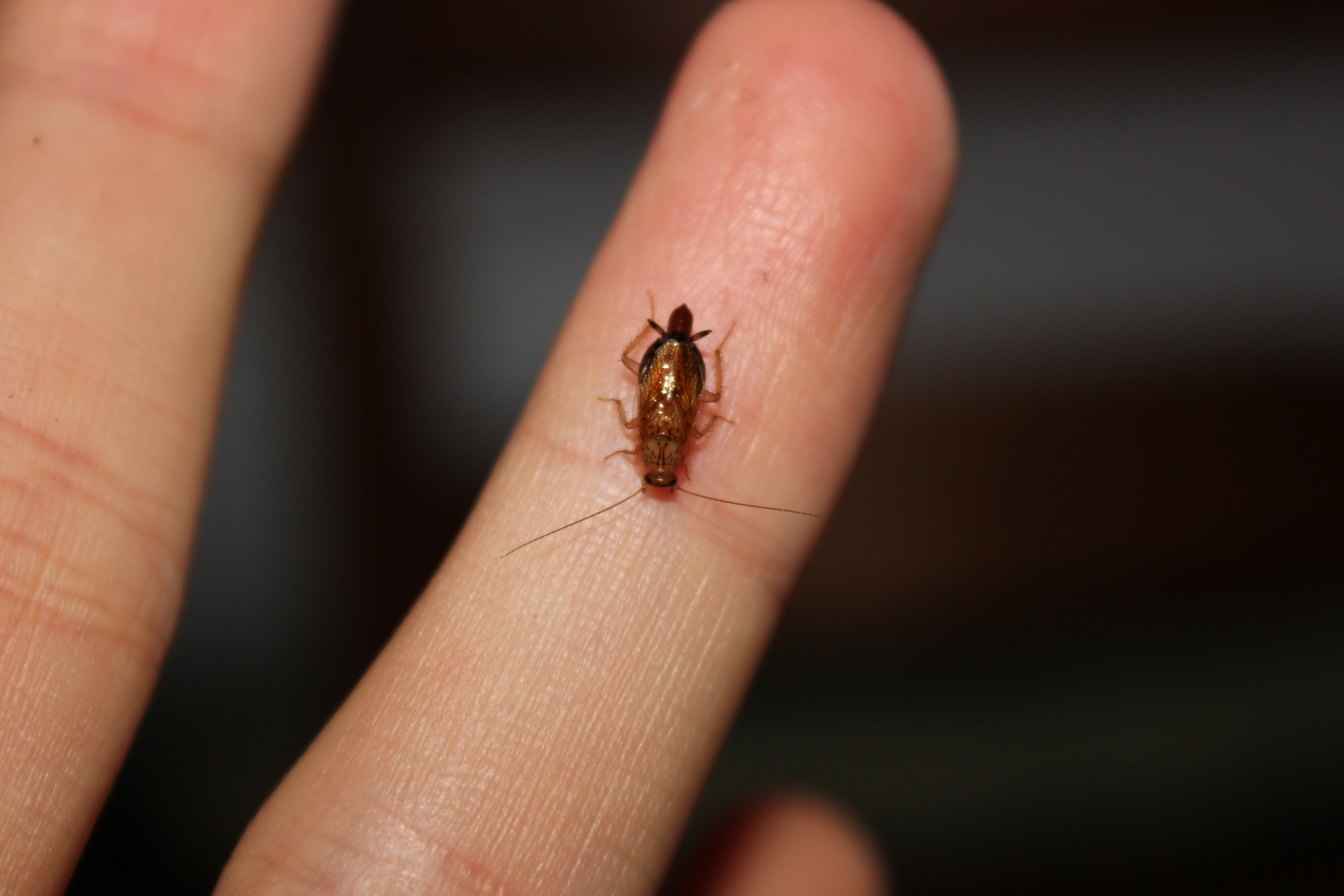
Adult female laying ootheca. Parents of this captive bred individual are from North Carolina

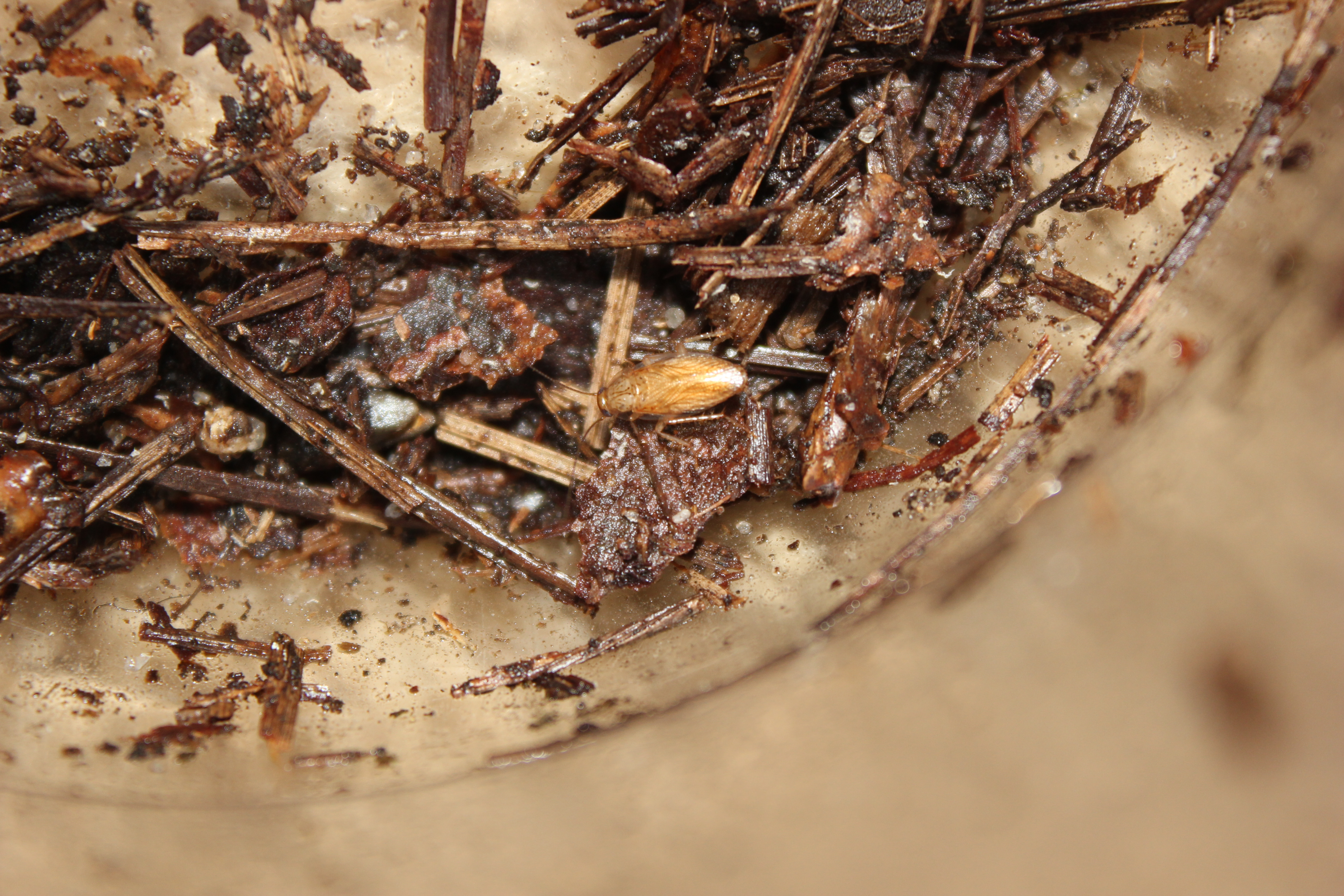
Adult male Cariblatta lutea. This individual was caught as a nymph from Southampton County, Virginia in pine needles.

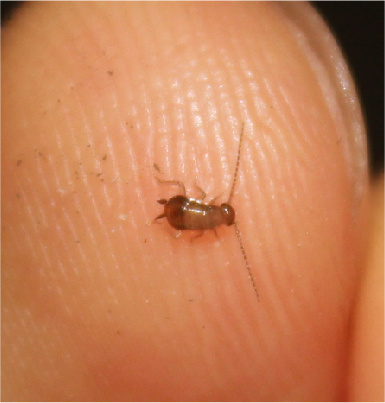
1st instar of Cariblatta lutea. Originally parents collected from Wake County or Granville County North Carolina.

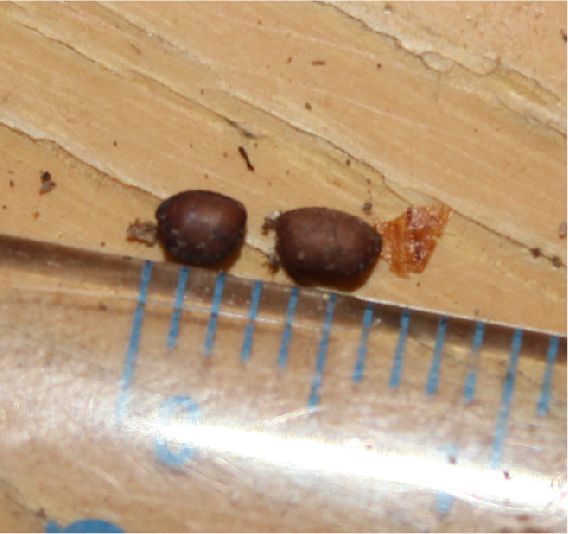
Oothecae of Cariblatta lutea from Durham, NC. The ruler is centimeters and millimeters.
