= Formica biamoensis =

Formica biamoensis Temporal range: Priabonian

Scientific classification
- Domain: Eukaryota
- Kingdom: Animalia
- Phylum: Arthropoda
- Class: Insecta
- Order: Hymenoptera
- Family: Formicidae
- Subfamily: Formicinae
- Genus: Formica
- Species: F. biamoensis

Binomial name
- Formica biamoensis Dlussky, Rasnitsyn & Perfilieva, 2015

Extinct species of ant

Formica biamoensis is an extinct species of formicid in the ant subfamily Formicinae known from fossils found in eastern Asia.

== History and classification ==
Formica biamoensis is known from a single ant found in Russia. The specimen was described from a compression fossil preserved in diatomite deposits of the Bol’shaya Svetlovodnaya site. Located in the Pozharsky District, on the Pacific Coast of Russia, the fossil-bearing rocks preserve possibly Priabonian plants and animals which lived in a small lake near a volcano. The site has been attributed to either the Maksimovka or Salibez Formations and compared to the Bembridge Marls and Florissant Formation, both of which are Priabonian in age.

At the time of description, the holotype specimen, number PIN 3429/1141 was preserved in the A. A. Borissiak Paleontological Institute collections, part of the Russian Academy of Sciences. The fossil was first described by the trio of paleomyrmecologists Gennady Dlussky, Alexandr Rasnitsyn and Ksenia Perfilieva. In the type description, Dlussky, Rasnitsyn and Perfilieva named the species F. biamoensis, with the specific epithet derived from "Biamo", the older name for the type locality.

F. biamoensis is similar in overall appearance to the Baltic amber species Formica flori and Formica gustawi, but differs in the eyes and petiole size. Comparison to other species is complicated however, by the other fossil workers being described from amber specimens and not compression fossils like F. biamoensis. At the time of description the authors noted that it was not possible to tell if the F. biamoensis workers and the Formica paleosibirica males described in the same paper were separate species.

== Description ==
The holotype worker is approximately 7.5 mm (0.30 in) with a slender mesosoma, weakly rounded pronotum and a thick petiole node. The side of the node facing the gaster is bowed outwards forming a curved profile and the top of the node is rounded. The head has oval compound eyes that are placed towards the back end and are small compared to other Formica species. While the chewing edges of the mandibles are not preserved enough to determine the presence of teeth, the ends of the chewing margins each have an acute tooth. The preserved antennae segments are all longer than they are wide.
