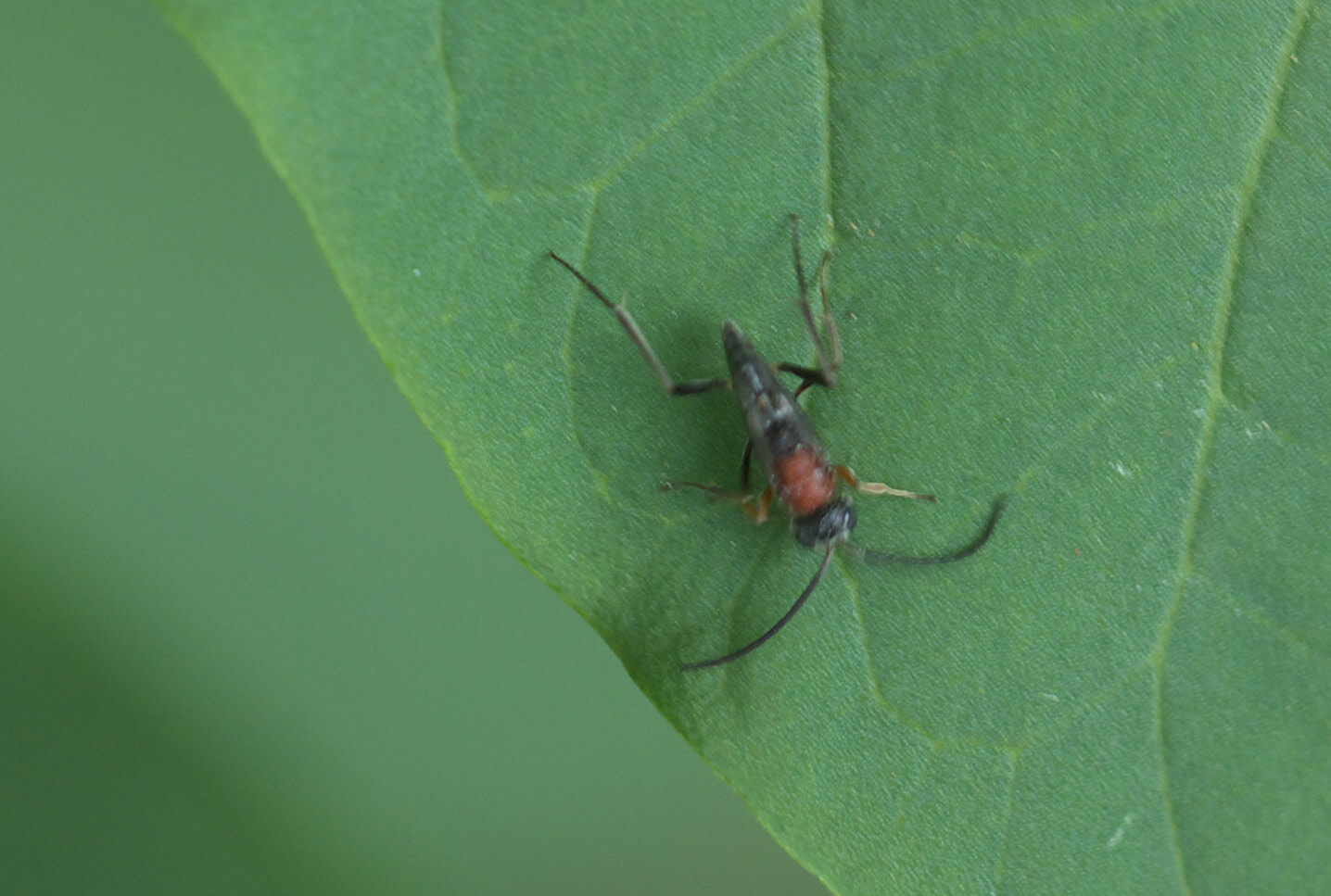

Scientific classification
- Kingdom: Animalia
- Phylum: Arthropoda
- Class: Insecta
- Order: Hymenoptera
- Family: Evaniidae
- Genus: Evaniella
- Species: E. semaeoda

Binomial name
- Evaniella semaeoda (Bradley, 1908)

= Evaniella semaeoda =

Species of wasp

Evaniella semaeoda is a species of ensign wasp in the family Evaniidae. It is found in the Caribbean Sea and North America.
