= Brachygaster gussakovskiji =

Scientific classification
- Kingdom: Animalia
- Phylum: Arthropoda
- Clade: Pancrustacea
- Class: Insecta
- Order: Hymenoptera
- Family: Evaniidae
- Genus: Brachygaster
- Species: B. gussakovskiji

Binomial name
- Brachygaster gussakovskiji Belokobylskij, 2019

Species of wasp

Brachygaster gussakovskiji is a species of parasitoid wasp belonging to the family Evaniidae.
