= Pachycondyla oligocenica =

Pachycondyla oligocenica Temporal range: Priabonian

Scientific classification
- Domain: Eukaryota
- Kingdom: Animalia
- Phylum: Arthropoda
- Class: Insecta
- Order: Hymenoptera
- Family: Formicidae
- Genus: Pachycondyla
- Species: †P. oligocenica

Binomial name
- †Pachycondyla oligocenica Dlussky, Rasnitsyn & Perfilieva, 2015

Extinct species of ant

Pachycondyla oligocenica is an extinct species of formicid in the ant subfamily Ponerinae known from a fossil found in eastern Asia.

== History and classification ==
P. oligocenica is known from a single ant found in Russia. The specimen was described from a compression fossil preserved in diatomite deposits of the Bol’shaya Svetlovodnaya site. The site is exposed on the bank of Barachek Creek 3 km (3,000 m) upstream from the creeks confluence with the Bol’shaya Svetlovodnaya River in the Pozharsky District, on the Pacific Coast of Russia. The fossil-bearing rocks preserve possibly Priabonian plants and animals which lived in and around a small lake near a volcano. The site has been attributed to either the Maksimovka or Salibez Formations and compared to the Bembridge Marls and Florissant Formation, both of which are Priabonian in age.

At the time of description, the holotype male specimen, number PIN 3429/1112 was preserved in the A. A. Borissiak Paleontological Institute collections, part of the Russian Academy of Sciences. The fossil was first described by the trio of paleomyrmecologists Gennady Dlussky, Alexandr Rasnitsyn and Ksenia Perfilieva. In the type description, Dlussky, Rasnitsyn and Perfilieva named the species P. oligocenica, with the specific epithet derived "Oligocene" the possible age of the site.

At the time of description, only two other Pachycondyla species males had been described from fossils; the males of both P. baltica and P. succinea are known from fossils entombed in Eocene age Baltic amber. P. oligocenica is distinguished from both baltic amber species in that the holotype male is larger than the other males, males of those species with bodies ranging between 3.5–4.5 mm (0.14–0.18 in) long. P. oligocenica is one of two Pachycondyla species that were described by Dlussky, Rasnitsyn and Perfilieva from Bol’shaya Svetlovodnaya, the other species P. aberrans being described from a partial queen or male.

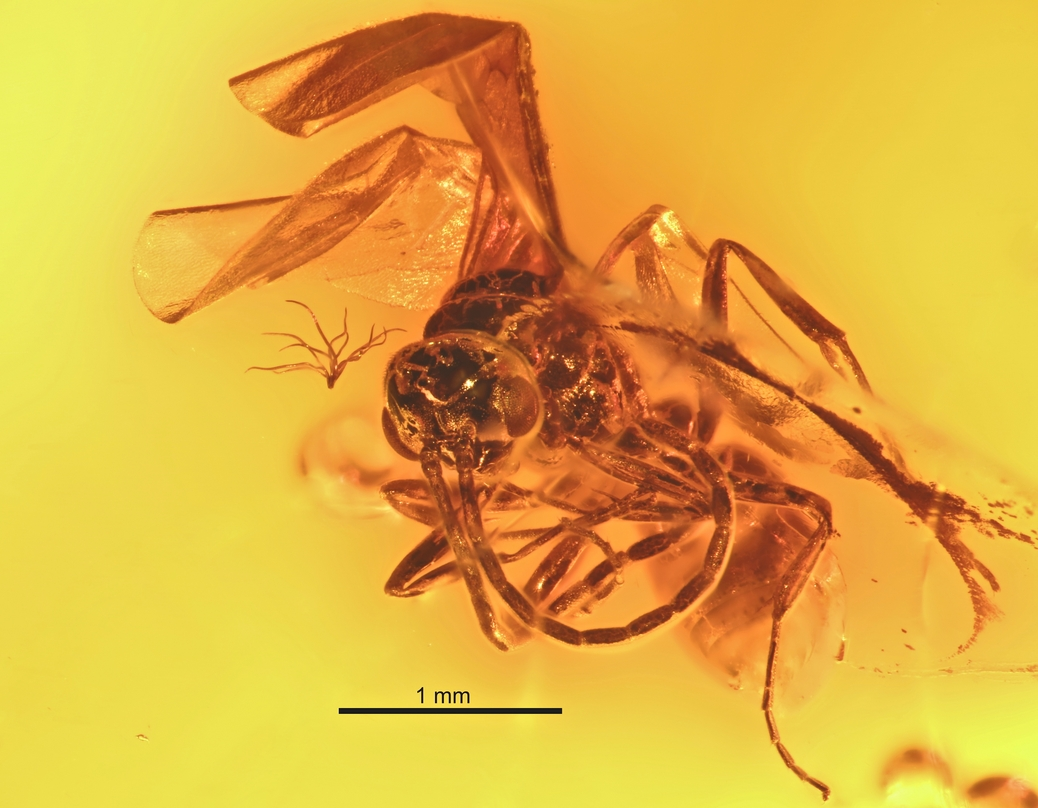
P. succinea male

== Description ==
Though incomplete, the P. oligocenica male has an estimated body length of 7 mm (0.28 in), while the alitrunk is 2.3 mm (0.091 in). The head has an almost square outline, being slightly shorter than it is wide, and the rear edge is rounded. The large oval shaped eyes convex in shape, protruding slightly from the head capsule. Neither of the mandibles have any teeth along the edges, and they are placed far apart on the head, preventing touching when they close. The antennae are not preserved from the holotype, so the structure and length was unknown at the time of description. The forewing has a length of 4.1 mm (0.16 in) with the veins fully enclosing and forming the cells 1+2r, 3r, mcu, and rm. The rm cell is not present in the forewing of P. aberrans, distinguishing the two species.
