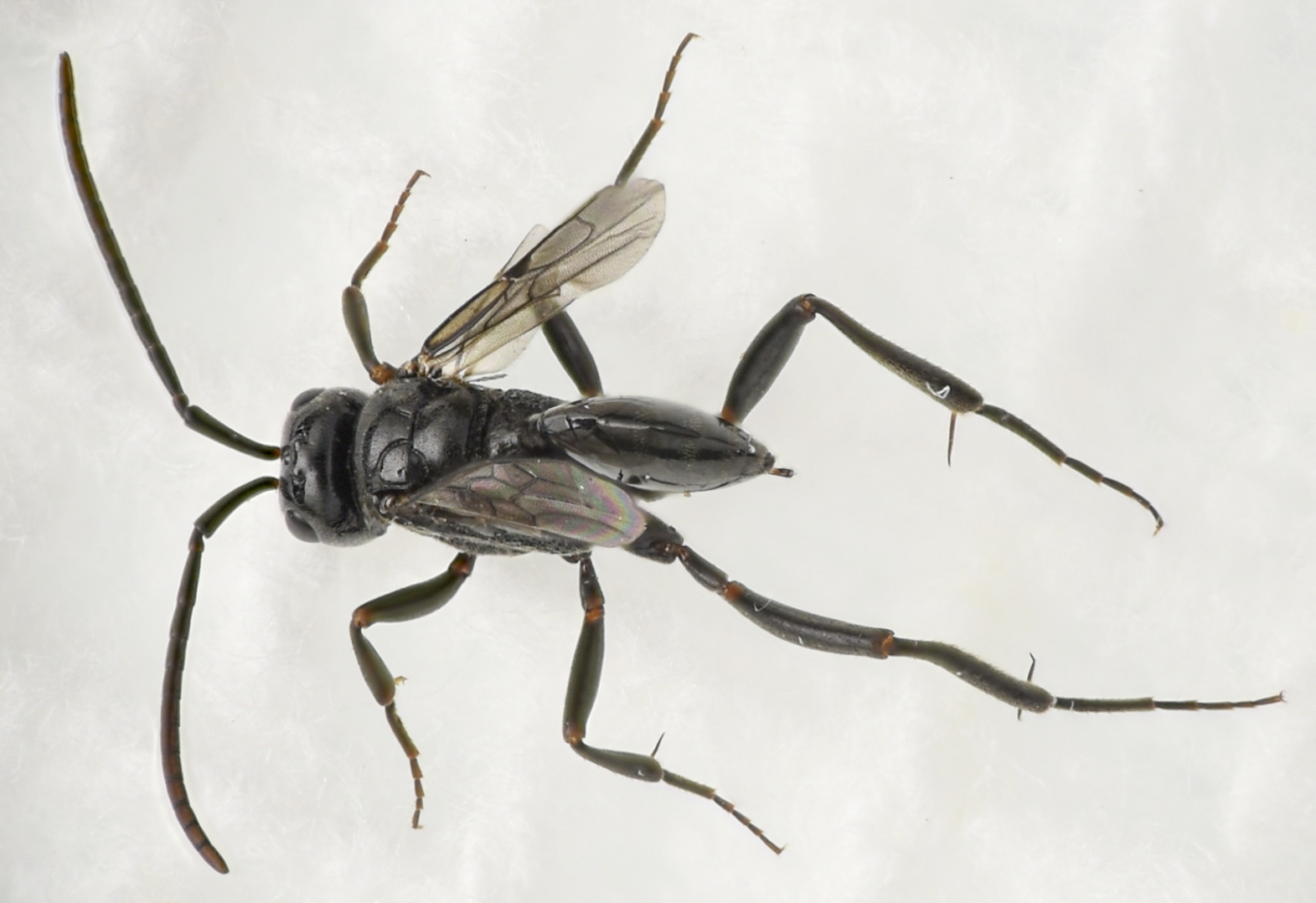

Scientific classification
- Kingdom: Animalia
- Phylum: Arthropoda
- Clade: Pancrustacea
- Class: Insecta
- Order: Hymenoptera
- Family: Evaniidae
- Genus: Evaniella
- Species: E. californica

Binomial name
- Evaniella californica (Ashmead, 1901)

= Evaniella californica =

Species of wasp

Evaniella californica is a species of ensign wasp in the family Evaniidae. It is found in North America.
