= Formica paleosibirica =

Formica paleosibirica Temporal range: Priabonian

Scientific classification
- Kingdom: Animalia
- Phylum: Arthropoda
- Class: Insecta
- Order: Hymenoptera
- Family: Formicidae
- Subfamily: Formicinae
- Genus: Formica
- Species: F. paleosibirica

Binomial name
- Formica paleosibirica Dlussky, Rasnitsyn & Perfilieva, 2015

Extinct species of ant

Formica paleosibirica is an extinct species of formicid in the ant subfamily Formicinae known from fossils found in eastern Asia.

== History and classification ==
F. paleosibirica is known from a group of ants found in Russia. The specimens were described from compression fossils preserved in diatomite deposits of the Bol’shaya Svetlovodnaya site. Located in the Pozharsky District, on the Pacific Coast of Russia, the fossil-bearing rocks preserve possibly Priabonian plants and animals which lived in a small lake near a volcano. The site has been attributed to either the Maksimovka or Salibez Formations and compared to the Bembridge Marls and Florissant Formation, both of which are Priabonian in age.

At the time of description, the holotype and paratype specimens were preserved in the A. A. Borissiak Paleontological Institute collections, part of the Russian Academy of Sciences. The fossils examined consisted of three partial males and two isolated fore-wings only. The fossils were first described by the trio of paleomyrmecologists Gennady Dlussky, Alexandr Rasnitsyn and Ksenia Perfilieva. In the type description, Dlussky, Rasnitsyn and Perfilieva named the species F. paleosibirica, with the specific epithet derived from the Greek palaios, meaning "ancient" plus "Siberia" referring to the origin of the fossils.

F. paleosibirica is similar in overall appearance to the Baltic amber species F. flori and F. gustawi, but differs in the shape of the genitalia, and to F. ungeri of Radoboj in Croatia, but differs in the contour of the propodeum. At the time of description the authors noted that it was not possible to tell if the F. paleosibirica males and the Formica biamoensis workers described in the same paper were separate species.

== Description ==
Males range in length between 10–13 mm (0.39–0.51 in) with fore-wings that are between 6.1–6.7 mm (0.24–0.26 in) long. The heads are generally trapezoid in outline with rounded back margins and large oval eyes. On the antennae, the scape is longer than the head length, and protrudes past the back margin of the head capsule. The propodeum has a smoothly low rounded upper profile that differs from the propodeum of F. ungeri, which forms an obtuse angle. The petiole has a triangular outline and is of similar length as it is high. The stipes on the genitalia are rounded at the tips and triangular in shape. They differ from those of F. flori and F. gustawi which have stipes that are less rounded.
