= Evaniella =

Scientific classification
- Kingdom: Animalia
- Phylum: Arthropoda
- Class: Insecta
- Order: Hymenoptera
- Family: Evaniidae
- Genus: Evaniella; Bradley, 1905

Genus of wasps

Evaniella is a genus of ensign wasps in the family Evaniidae. There are more than 70 described species in Evaniella.

== Species ==
These 76 species belong to the genus Evaniella:

- Evaniella albispina (Cameron, 1887)
- Evaniella alticola (Kieffer, 1910)
- Evaniella areolata (Schletterer, 1889)
- Evaniella bakeriana (Kieffer, 1910)
- Evaniella barbata (Frison, 1922)
- Evaniella bella (Frison, 1922)
- Evaniella bifurcata (Kieffer, 1910)
- Evaniella boliviana (Strand, 1912)
- Evaniella brachystylus (Schletterer, 1889)
- Evaniella brevidens (Kieffer, 1910)
- Evaniella brevigena (Kieffer, 1904)
- Evaniella calcarata (Schletterer, 1889)
- Evaniella californica (Ashmead, 1901)
- Evaniella cameroni Bradley, 1908
- Evaniella carinulata (Schletterer, 1889)
- Evaniella cerviculata (Frison, 1922)
- Evaniella clara (Frison, 1922)
- Evaniella compressa (Fabricius, 1804)
- Evaniella concolor (Taschenberg, 1891)
- Evaniella crassicornis (Kieffer, 1911)
- Evaniella curvipes (Taschenberg, 1891)
- Evaniella delicata (Frison, 1922)
- Evaniella dichela (Kieffer, 1910)
- Evaniella dichronyx (Kieffer, 1910)
- Evaniella dispersa (Schletterer, 1889)
- Evaniella ditoma (Kieffer, 1911)
- Evaniella eocenica Sawoniewicz & Kupryjanowicz, 2003
- Evaniella erythraspis (Cameron, 1911)
- Evaniella ferruginea (Kieffer, 1904)
- Evaniella ferruginescens (Schletterer, 1889)
- Evaniella flagellata (Schletterer, 1889)
- Evaniella gemina (Schletterer, 1889)
- Evaniella haarupi (Cameron, 1909)
- Evaniella haenschi (Enderlein, 1901)
- Evaniella hoffmannsi (Enderlein, 1909)
- Evaniella huebneri (Roman, 1917)
- Evaniella isomera (Kieffer, 1910)
- Evaniella latidens (Kieffer, 1910)
- Evaniella levigena (Kieffer, 1904)
- Evaniella luculenta (Frison, 1922)
- Evaniella macrochela (Kieffer, 1910)
- Evaniella maximiliani (Schletterer, 1886)
- Evaniella mendozaensis (Cameron, 1909)
- Evaniella microthorax (Kieffer, 1910)
- Evaniella miniacea (Enderlein, 1905)
- Evaniella minor (Schletterer, 1886)
- Evaniella montivaga (Kieffer, 1910)
- Evaniella mystica (Frison, 1922)
- Evaniella nana (Schletterer, 1889)
- Evaniella neomexicana (Ashmead, 1901)
- Evaniella nigricornis (Fabricius, 1804)
- Evaniella nobilis (Westwood, 1851)
- Evaniella oreas (Kieffer, 1911)
- Evaniella ornaticornis (Cameron, 1887)
- Evaniella parvidens (Kieffer, 1910)
- Evaniella planiceps (Kieffer, 1910)
- Evaniella polita (Schletterer, 1889)
- Evaniella psilopsis (Kieffer, 1911)
- Evaniella pulcherrima (Szépligeti, 1903)
- Evaniella rhopalocera (Kieffer, 1910)
- Evaniella robusta (Schletterer, 1889)
- Evaniella rufa (Taschenberg, 1891)
- Evaniella ruficaput (Dewitz, 1881)
- Evaniella ruficornis (Fabricius, 1804)
- Evaniella rufidorsum (Szépligeti, 1903)
- Evaniella rufonotata (Kieffer, 1904)
- Evaniella rufosparsa (Kieffer, 1911)
- Evaniella rugifrons (Cameron, 1887)
- Evaniella semaeoda (Bradley, 1908)
- Evaniella semirubra (Cresson, 1865)
- Evaniella signata (Schletterer, 1889)
- Evaniella tarsalis (Schletterer, 1889)
- Evaniella tomentella (Kieffer, 1904)
- Evaniella tractigena (Kieffer, 1910)
- Evaniella trochanterata (Cameron, 1887)
- Evaniella varicornis (Cameron, 1887)
