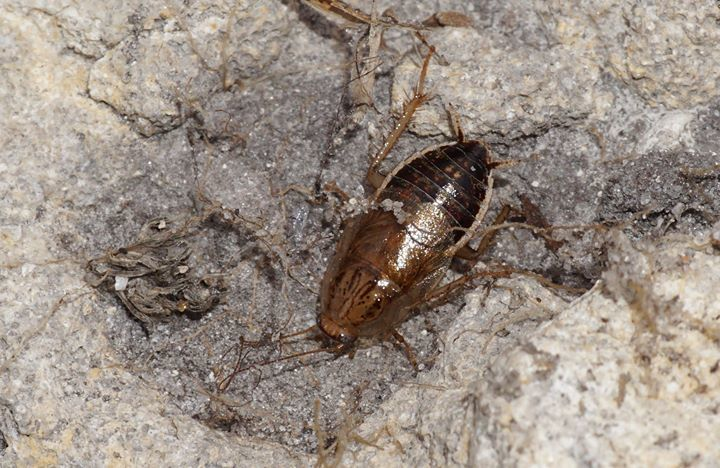

Scientific classification
- Kingdom: Animalia
- Phylum: Arthropoda
- Clade: Pancrustacea
- Class: Insecta
- Order: Blattodea
- Family: Ectobiidae
- Genus: Cariblatta
- Species: C. minima

Binomial name
- Cariblatta minima Hebard, 1916

= Cariblatta minima =

Species of cockroach

Cariblatta minima, the least yellow cockroach, is a species of cockroach in the family Ectobiidae. It is found in North America and the Caribbean.
