= Iberoevania =

Iberoevania Temporal range: Early Cretaceous

Scientific classification
- Kingdom: Animalia
- Phylum: Arthropoda
- Class: Insecta
- Order: Hymenoptera
- Superfamily: Evanioidea
- Family: Evaniidae
- Genus: †Iberoevania; Peñalver et al., 2010
- Species: †I. roblesi

Binomial name
- †Iberoevania roblesi Peñalver et al., 2010

Extinct genus of wasps

Iberoevania is an extinct genus of evaniid which existed in what is now Spain during the early Cretaceous period. It was named by Enrique Peñalver, Jaime Ortega-Blanco, André Nel and Xavier Delclòs in 2010, and the only species is Iberoevania roblesi.
