= Alexandr Rasnitsyn =

Russian entomologist (born 1936)

Alexandr Pavlovich (Alex) Rasnitsyn
- Александр Павлович Расницын
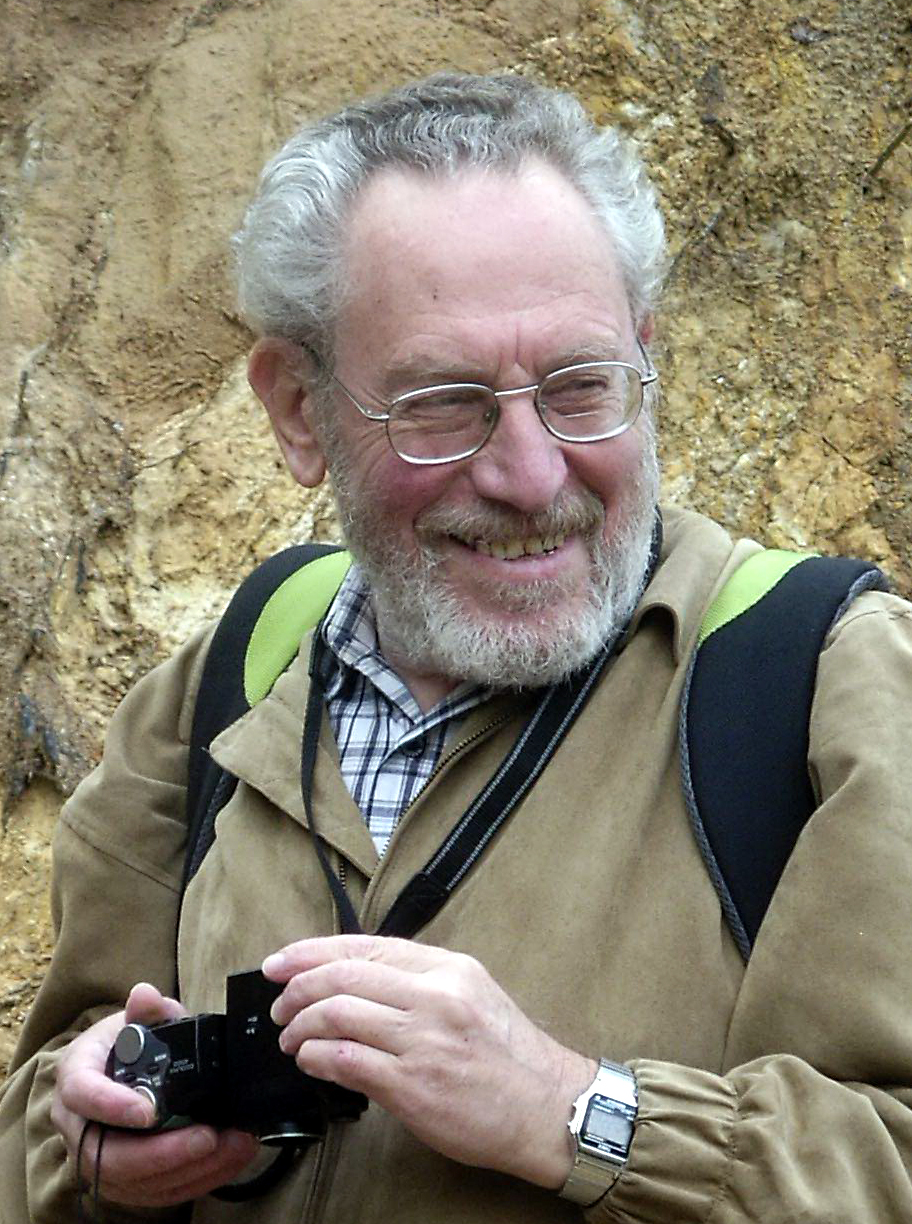
- Rasnitsyn at an amber locality in Alava, Spain
- Born: September 24, 1936 (age 89); Moscow, USSR
- Education: Moscow State University
- Awards: Honored Scientist of Russian Federation, 2001
- Scientific career
- Fields: Entomology, Paleontology
- Workplaces: Paleontological Institute, RAS

Alexandr Pavlovich Rasnitsyn (Russian: Александр Павлович Расницын) is a Russian entomologist, expert in palaeoentomology, and Honored Scientist of the Russian Federation (2001). His scientific interests are centered on the palaeontology, phylogeny, and taxonomy of hymenopteran insects and insects in general. He has also studied broader biological problems such as evolutionary theory, the principles of phylogenetics, taxonomy, nomenclature, and palaeoecology. He has published over 300 articles and books in several languages. In August 2008 he was awarded the Distinguished Research Medal of the International Society of Hymenopterists.

== Biography ==
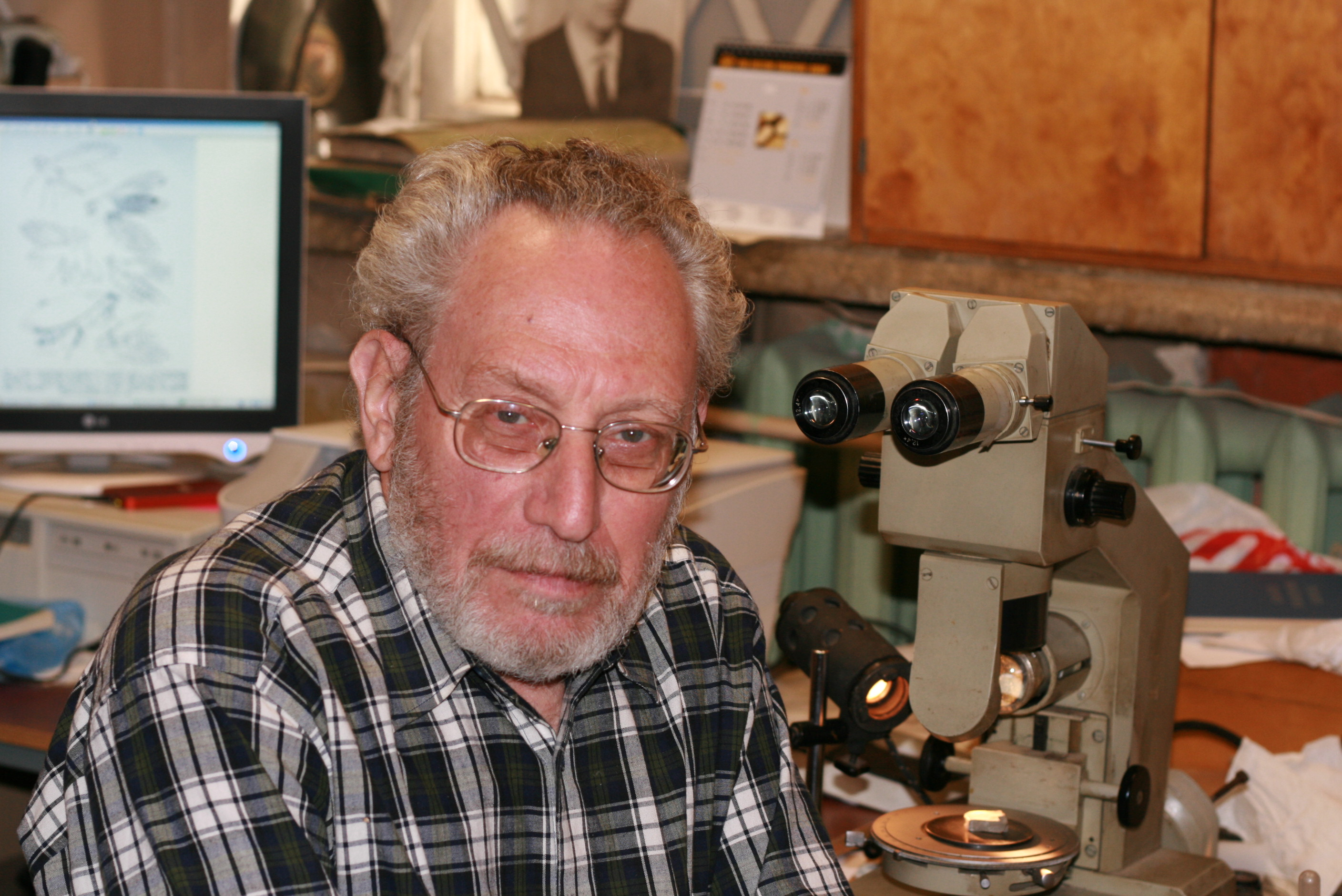
A.P. Rasnitsyn in his laboratory

Alexandr Rasnitsyn was born on 24 September 1936 in Moscow. As a schoolboy Alex was active in the Society of Young Biologists at the Moscow Zoo. In 1955 he became a student at the Biological Faculty of the Moscow State University and in 1960 he graduated with honors from the Department of Entomology. His Master thesis was "Hibernation in the ichneumon-fly subfamily Ichneumoninae". The same year Rasnitsyn joined the Laboratory of Arthropods at the Paleontological institute, Academy of Sciences of USSR. In 1967 he received his Ph.D. in biology from the Paleontological Institute with the thesis "The Mesozoic Hymenoptera Symphyta and the early evolution of Xyelidae". After defending in 1978 his Dr. hab. (doktor nauk) thesis "The origin and evolution of Hymenoptera" Rasnitsyn became Head of the Laboratory of Arthropods. In 1991 he received the title of a Biology Professor. In 1996 he resigned from heading the Laboratory and continued there as a principal research worker, but after the new leader, Vladimir Zherikhin, died in 2001 Rasnitsyn again became the acting Head of the Laboratory (2002—present).

Between 2001 and 2005 Rasnitsyn served as President of the International Palaeoentomological Society. Since 2007 he is serving on the Council of the Russian Entomological Society.

During more than 20 field seasons between 1956 and 2009 Rasnitsyn conducted field work in various regions of Russia and the former USSR, including Fergana Valley, Issyk Kul, Central Asia, Transbaikalia, Taimyr, Okhotsk, Sikhote-Alin, and other parts of Siberia, Far East, and Mongolia.

== Family ==
Rasnitsyn has one son, Dmitri, who is from a previous marriage. Dmitri married a Masha Kreinin and Rasnitsyn now has three grandchildren; Alexandra, Shelly, and Jonathan Rasnitsyn, who all live in the US.

== Research ==
One of the world's leading paleoentomologists, Rasnitsyn has described ca. 250 new genera and over 800 new species of fossil insects from various orders.

He is one of the foremost authorities on the paleontology and systematics of Hymenoptera whose ideas have formed the foundation of the modern classification of that insect order. Instead of the traditional division into Symphyta and Apocrita, he divided the order into “sawflies” (Siricina) and “stinging and parasitic wasps’’ (Vespina), the latter suborder including the parasitic Orussoidea, traditionally placed in the Symphyta.

Rasnitsyn suggested his own hypothesis on the origin of insect flight. According to him, the wings first evolved, as a means to control gliding, in relatively large insects that had turned to feeding on generative organs of arboreal plants.

Rasnitsyn is one of the most consistent opponents of cladism. He develops an alternative approach to biological systematics, called “phyletics”, which differs from phenetics in taking into account genealogy in addition to similarities and hiatuses.

He also contributed significantly to the epigenetic theory of evolution and, in particular, has put forward the concept of “adaptive compromise” and the notion of macroevolution being irreducible to microevolutionary processes alone.

Rasnitsyn has also made a significant contribution to paleoecology and in collaboration with Vladimir Zherikhin developed the theory of ecological crises.

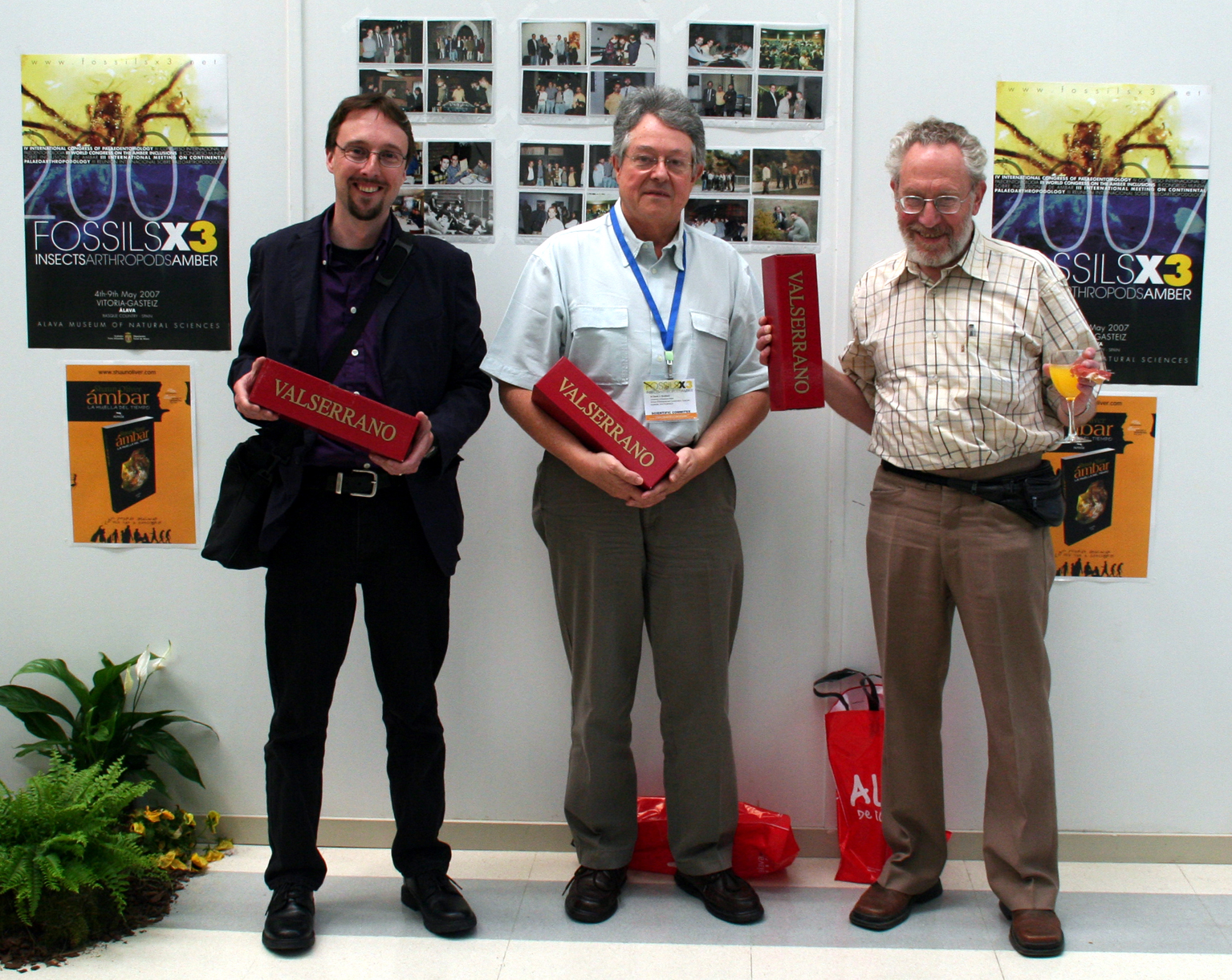
Three presidents of the International Palaeoentomological Society at the FossilsX3, Vitoria-Gasteiz, 2007: Andrew Ross, Denis Brothers, and Alexandr Rasnitsyn

== New taxa described by Alexandr Rasnitsyn ==
- Suborder †Eolepidopterigina Rasnitsyn, 1983 – a suborder of Lepidoptera with the family Eolepidopterigidae Rasnitsyn, 1983
- Suborder †Aneuretopsychina Rasnitsyn et Kozlov, 1990 – a suborder of Mecoptera with the family Aneuretopsychidae Rasnitsyn et Kozlov, 1990
- Superfamily †Karatavitoidea Rasnitsyn, 1963 – a Mesozoic superfamily of the infraorder Orussomorpha Newman, 1834 with the family Karatavitidae Rasnitsyn, 1963
- Superfamily †Bethylonymoidea Rasnitsyn, 1975 – a Mesozoic superfamily of Hymenoptera Apocrita with the family Bethylonymidae Rasnitsyn, 1975. The ancestor group of Aculeata.
- Family †Parapamphiliidae Rasnitsyn, 1968 – later was included into Sepulcidae Rasnitsyn, 1968 as the subfamily Parapamphiliinae Rasnitsyn, 1968
- Family †Xyelydidae Rasnitsyn, 1968 – a Mesozoic family of Hymenoptera Symphyta from the superfamily Pamphilioidea
- Family †Gigasiricidae Rasnitsyn, 1968 – a Jurassic family of Hymenoptera Symphyta from the superfamily Siricoidea
- Family †Xyelotomidae Rasnitsyn, 1968 – a Mesozoic family of Hymenoptera Symphyta from the superfamily Tenthredinoidea
- Family †Pararchexyelydae Rasnitsyn, 1968 – a Mesozoic family of Hymenoptera Symphyta
- Family †Praeaulacidae Rasnitsyn, 1972 – a Mesozoic family of Hymenoptera Apocrita from the superfamily Evanioidea
- Family †Maimetshidae Rasnitsyn, 1975 – a Cretaceous family of Hymenoptera Apocrita from the superfamily Ceraphronoidea
- Family †Cretevaniidae Rasnitsyn, 1975 – a Mesozoic family of Hymenoptera Apocrita from the superfamily Evanioidea
- Family †Kotujellidae Rasnitsyn, 1975 – a Mesozoic family of Hymenoptera Apocrita from the superfamily Evanioidea (later included into Gasteruptiidae Ashmead, 1900)
- Family †Anomopterellidae Rasnitsyn, 1975 – a Mesozoic family of Hymenoptera Apocrita from the superfamily Evanioidea
- Family †Baissidae Rasnitsyn, 1975 – a Mesozoic family of Hymenoptera Apocrita from the superfamily Evanioidea (later was included into Aulacidae Schuckard, 1841)
- Family †Ichneumonomimidae Rasnitsyn, 1975 – a Mesozoic family of Hymenoptera Apocrita. Systematic position uncertain, probably a relative of Ichneumonoidea
- Family †Angarosphecidae Rasnitsyn, 1975 – a Mesozoic family of Hymenoptera Apocrita from the superfamily Scolioidea
- Family †Falsiformicidae Rasnitsyn, 1975 – a Cretaceous family of Hymenoptera Apocrita from the superfamily Scolioidea
- Family †Baissodidae Rasnitsyn, 1975 – a Mesozoic family of Hymenoptera Apocrita
- Family †Evenkiidae Rasnitsyn, 1977 – a Carboniferous family of the order Protortoptera
- Family †Permonkidae Rasnitsyn, 1977 – a family of Miomoptera
- Family †Palaeomantiscidae Rasnitsyn, 1977 – a family of Miomoptera
- Family †Karataidae Rasnitsyn, 1977 – a Mesozoic family of Hymenoptera Apocrita
- Family †Electrotomidae Rasnitsyn, 1977 – a family of Tenthredinoidea from Baltic amber
- Family †Praeichneumonidae Rasnitsyn, 1983 – a Lower Cretaceous family of the superfamily Ichneumonoidea
- Family †Strashilidae Rasnitsyn, 1992 – a family of Mecopteroidea. Hypothetical ancestors of Anoplura
- Family †Saurodectidae Rasnitsyn et Zherikhin, 2000 – a Mesozoic family of Mallophaga
- Family †Andreneliidae Rasnitsyn et Martinez-Delclos, 2000 – a family of Hymenoptera Apocrita of the superfamily Evanioidea
- Family †Tshekarcephalidae Novokshonov et Rasnitsyn, 2000 – a Paleozoic family of uncertain systematic position
- Family †Daohugoidae Rasnitsyn et Zhang, 2004 – a family of Hymenoptera Symphyta of the superfamily Siricoidea
- Family †Khutelchalcididae Rasnitsyn, Basibuyuk et Quicke, 2004 – a family of Chalcidoidea
- Family †Radiophronidae Ortega-Blanco, Rasnitsyn et Delclos, 2010 – a Mesozoic family of Ceraphronoidea
- Subfamily †Archexyelinae Rsan., 1964 – a subfamily of Xyelidae Newman, 1834
- Subfamily †Dolichostigmatinae Rasnitsyn, 1968 – a subfamily of Anaxyelidae Martynov., 1925
- Subfamily †Karatavitinae Rasnitsyn, 1968 –a subfamily of Karatavitidae Rasnitsyn, 1963
- Subfamily †Sepulcinae Rasnitsyn, 1968 – was described as a subfamily of Karatavitidae Rasnitsyn, 1963, later was raised to the family rank, Sepulcidae Rasnitsyn, 1968
- Subfamily †Auliscinae Rasnitsyn, 1968 – a subfamily of Karatavitidae Rasnitsyn, 1963
- Subfamily †Praesiricinae Rasnitsyn, 1968 – was described as a subfamily of Karatavitidae Rasnitsyn, 1963, later was raised to the family rank, Praesiricidae Rasnitsyn, 1968
- Subfamily †Madygellinae Rasnitsyn, 1969 – a subfamily of Xyelidae Newman, 1834
- Subfamily †Cleistogastrinae Rasnitsyn, 1975 – a subfamily of Megalyridae Schletterer, 1889
- Subfamily Proscoliinae Rasnitsyn, 1977 – a recent subfamily of Scoliidae
- Subfamily †Juralydinae Rasnitsyn, 1977 – a subfamily of Pamphiliidae Cameron, 1890
- Subfamily †Mesorussinae Rasnitsyn, 1977 – a subfamily of Orussidae Mewman, 1834
- Subfamily †Cretogonalinae Rasnitsyn, 1977 – a subfamily of Trigonalidae Cresson, 1867
- Subfamily †Manlayinae Rasnitsyn, 1986 – a subfamily of Aulacidae Schuckard, 1841
- Subfamily †Ghilarellinae Rasnitsyn, 1986 – a subfamily of Sepulcidae Rasnitsyn, 1968
- Subfamily †Trematothoracinae Rasnitsyn, 1986 – a subfamily of Sepulcidae Rasnitsyn, 1968
- Subfamily †Priorvespinae Carpenter et Rasnitsyn, 1990 – a subfamily of Vespidae Latrielle, 1802
- Subfamily †Archaeoscoliinae Rasnitsyn, 1993 – a subfamily of Scoliidae
- Subfamily †Karataoserphinae Rasnitsyn, 1994 – a subfamily of Mesoserphidae Kozlov, 1970
- Subfamily †Iscopininae Rasnitsyn, 1980 – a subfamily of Pelecinidae Haliday, 1840.
- Tribe †Angaridyelini Rasnitsyn, 1966 – a tribe of the subfamily Macroxyelinae Ashmead, 1898 of the family Xyelidae
- Tribe †Cretodinapsini Rasnitsyn, 1977 – a tribe of the subfamily Megalyrinae of the family Megalyridae
- Tribe †Gigantoxyelini Rasnitsyn, 1969 – a tribe of the subfamily Macroxyelinae Ashmead, 1898 of the family Xyelidae Newmann, 1834

A.P. Rasnitsyn has also described ca. 250 new genera and over 800 new species of arthropods, mainly fossil.

== Animal names in honor of Alexandr Rasnitsyn ==
Over 50 species of animals have been named in honor of Rasnitsyn, as well as some taxa of higher rank:

- Rasnicynipidae Kovalev, 1996 (a replacement name for Rasnitsyniidae Kovalev, 1994)— a fossil family of Cynipoidea with the genus Rasnicynips Kovalev, 1996 (a replacement name for Rasnitsynia Kovalev 1994)
- Alexarasniidae Gorochov, 2011 — a fossil family of Polyneoptera with the genus Alexarasnia Gorochov, 2011
- Alexrasnitsyniidae Prokop & Nel, 2011 — a family of the Paleozoic order Diaphanopterodea with the genus Alexrasnitsynia Prokop & Nel, 2011
- Plumalexiidae Brothers, 2011 — a fossil family of Hymenoptera with the species Plumalexius rasnitsyni Brothers, 2011
- Rasnitsynaphididae Homan & Wegierek, 2011 — a fossil family of Aphidoidea with the species Rasnitsynaphis Homan & Wegierek, 2011
- Rasnitsynitini Kasparyan, 1994 — a tribe of the fossil subfamily Townesitinae of the family Ichneumonidae with the genus Rasnitsynites Kasparyan, 1994
- Rasnitsynella Krivolutzkii, 1976 — a fossil genus of Acarina
- Rasnitsynia Pagliano et Scaramozzino 1989 (a replacement name for Oligoneuroides Zhang 1985) — a fossil genus of Braconidae
- Rasnitsynitilla Lelej, 2006 — a genus of Mutillidae
- Alicodoxa rasnitsyni Emeljanov et Shcherbakov, 2011 — fossil genus and species of Fulgoroidea of the family Dictyopharidae
- Palerasnitsynus Wichard, Ross et Ross, 2011 — a fossil genus of Trichoptera of the family Psychomyiidae
- Rasnitsynala Zessin, Brauckmann et Groening, 2011 — a genus of Odonata from the family Erasipteridae

== Publications ==
A.P. Rasnitsyn is an author of more than 300 books and articles, including 17 monographs.

=== Major works ===
- Rasnitsyn AP (1969) Origin and evolution of lower Hymenoptera. Trudy Paleontologicheskogo Instituta Akademii Nauk SSSR 123: 1–196 [In Russian, with English translation by Amerind Co., New Delhi, 1979].
- Rasnitsyn AP (1975) Hymenoptera Apocrita of the Mesozoic. Trudy Paleontologicheskogo Instituta Akademii Nauk SSSR 147: 1–134 [In Russian].
- Rasnitsyn AP (1980) Origin and evolution of Hymenoptera. Trudy Paleontologicheskogo Instituta Akademii Nauk SSSR 174: 1–192 [In Russian].
- Rohdendorf BB, Rasnitsyn AP, editors (1980) Historical development of the class Insecta. Trudy Paleontologicheskogo Instituta Akademii Nauk SSSR 175: 1–269, +8 pls. [In Russian].
- Rasnitsyn AP, Quicke DLJ, editors (2002) History of Insects. Kluwer Academic Publishers, Dordrecht, xii+517 pp. ISBN 1-4020-0026-X.
- Rasnitsyn AP (2005) Selected Works on Evolutionary Biology. KMK Scientific Press, Moscow, Russia, iv+347 pp [In Russian] [Collection of earlier papers, except for: “Dynamics of taxonomic diversity: An afterword of 2004”, pp. 247–248]. ISBN 978-5-87317-454-6
- Zherikhin VV, Ponomarenko AG, Rasnitsyn AP (2008) Introduction to Palaeoentomology. KMK Scientific Press, Moscow, 371 pp. [In Russian].
