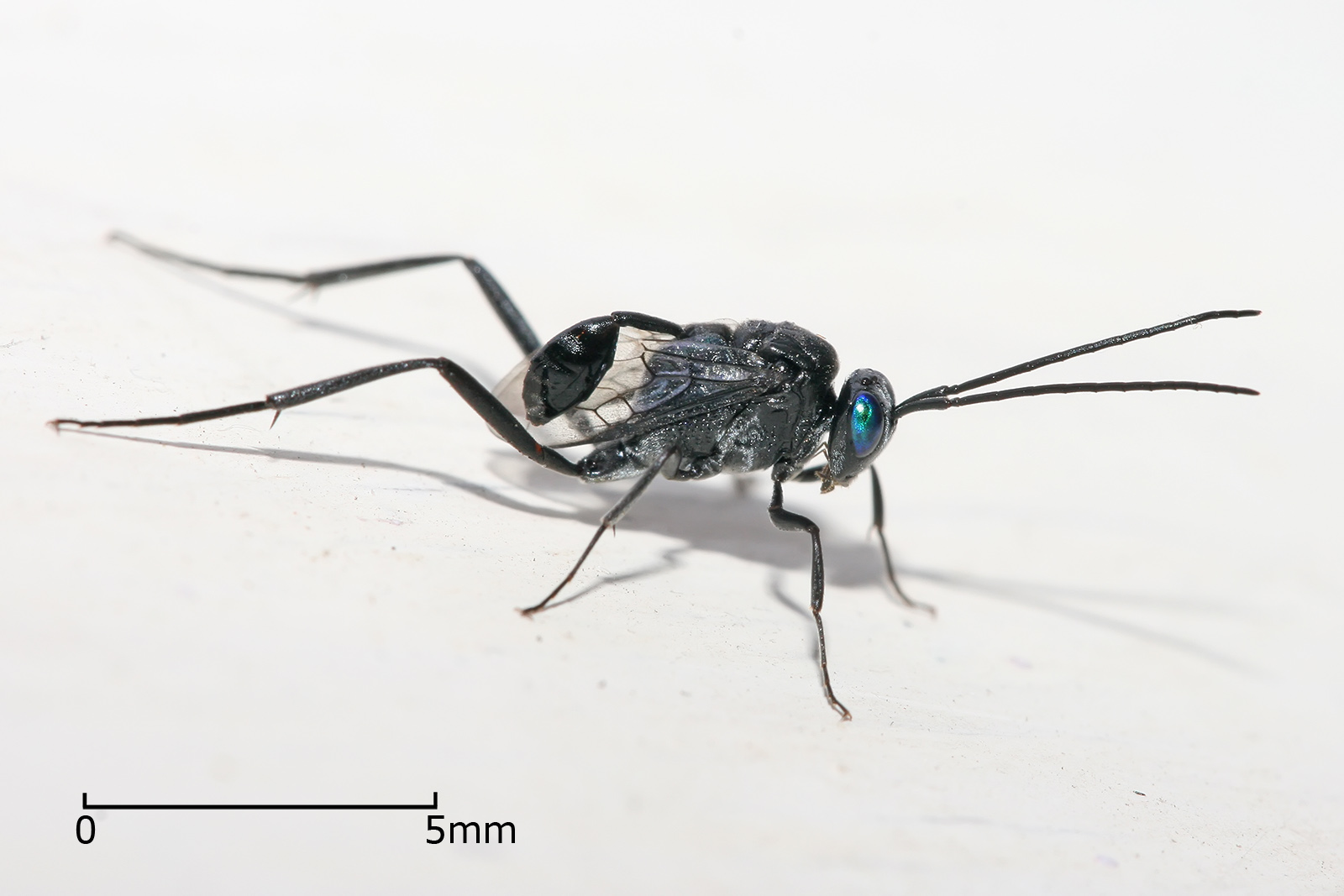
- Evania appendigaster

Scientific classification
- Kingdom: Animalia
- Phylum: Arthropoda
- Clade: Pancrustacea
- Class: Insecta
- Order: Hymenoptera
- Family: Evaniidae
- Genus: Evania; Fabricius, 1775

= Evania =

Genus of wasps

Evania is a genus of ensign wasps in the family Evaniidae. Like all members of the family, they are cockroach egg parasitoids. There are more than 60 described species in Evania. Evania appendigaster, the blue-eyed ensign wasp, is a common wasp found through most of the world.

== Species ==
These 66 species belong to the genus Evania:

- Evania abrahami Joseph, 1952
- Evania agraensis Joseph, 1952
- Evania albofacialis Cameron, 1887
- Evania angolensis Benoit, 1950
- Evania animensis Spinola, 1840
- Evania appendigaster (Linnaeus, 1758)
- Evania argenteocaudata Enderlein, 1901
- Evania bicarinata Kieffer, 1905
- Evania bonariensis Brèthes, 1913
- Evania borneana Cameron, 1902
- Evania brevipes Kieffer, 1924
- Evania canaliculata Kieffer, 1905
- Evania carinigera Kieffer, 1905
- Evania caspia Eichwald, 1830
- Evania cellularis Kieffer, 1911
- Evania chilensis Spinola, 1842
- Evania chinensis Szépligeti, 1903
- Evania congica De Saeger, 1943
- Evania cribrata Semenow, 1892
- Evania curtigena Kieffer, 1911
- Evania curvinervis Cameron, 1886
- Evania demeijerei Cameron, 1906
- Evania dubia Szépligeti, 1908
- Evania eos Ceballos, 1950
- Evania erythrocneme Enderlein, 1913
- Evania erythrothorax Szépligeti, 1908
- Evania excavata Szépligeti, 1908
- Evania fascialis Spinola, 1842
- Evania friburgensis Brèthes, 1913
- Evania fulvospina Cameron, 1906
- Evania fumipennis Enderlein, 1901
- Evania giganteipes Kieffer, 1911
- Evania hewitti Cameron, 1908
- Evania hirtipes Kieffer, 1907
- Evania hunteri Mani, 1943
- Evania johni Joseph, 1952
- Evania kuchingensis Cameron, 1908
- Evania mackenziei Muzaffer, 1943
- Evania magrettii Schletterer, 1889
- Evania muelleri Schletterer, 1889
- Evania mukerjii Mani, 1943
- Evania nurseana Cameron, 1906
- Evania oblonga Enderlein, 1909
- Evania oculatula Strand, 1912
- Evania opaca Kieffer, 1916
- Evania paraensis Spinola, 1851
- Evania parvula Kieffer, 1904
- Evania platensis Brèthes, 1913
- Evania platycephala De Saeger, 1943
- Evania porteri Brèthes, 1927
- Evania postfurcalis Strand, 1912
- Evania rodwayi Cameron, 1911
- Evania rubrofasciata Brues, 1916
- Evania rufescens Brèthes, 1913
- Evania ruficollis Fabricius, 1798
- Evania sanctipauli Kieffer, 1907
- Evania satanas Enderlein, 1906
- Evania sessilis Fabricius, 1793
- Evania simlaensis Cameron, 1909
- Evania sinicola Kieffer, 1924
- Evania stenochela Kieffer, 1911
- Evania subspinosa Kieffer, 1911
- Evania szepligetii Bradley, 1908
- Evania tinctipennis Cameron, 1887
- Evania trivandrensis Joseph, 1952
- Evania unipunctata Joseph, 1952
