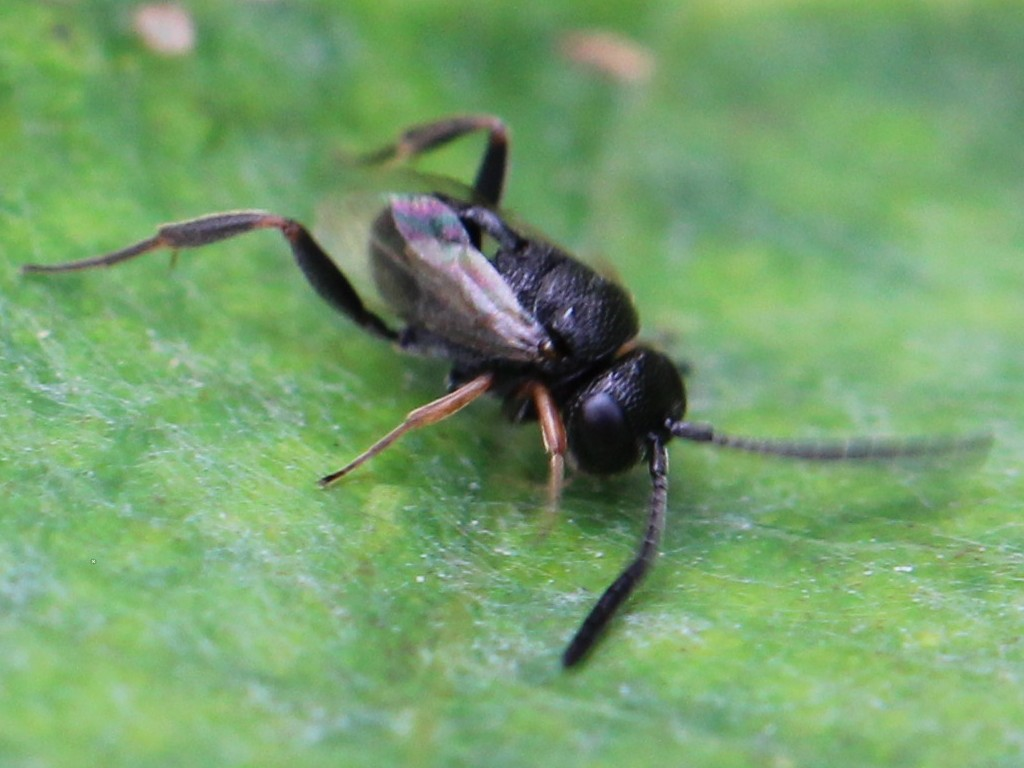
- Brachygaster minutus

Scientific classification
- Kingdom: Animalia
- Phylum: Arthropoda
- Clade: Pancrustacea
- Class: Insecta
- Order: Hymenoptera
- Family: Evaniidae
- Genus: Brachygaster; Leach, 1815

Synonyms
- Semaedogaster Bradley, 1905

= Brachygaster =

Genus of wasps

Brachygaster is a genus of insects belonging to the family Evaniidae. It was first described by William Elford Leach in 1815.

The genus has almost cosmopolitan distribution.

== Species ==
Species include the following:

- Brachygaster aethiopicus Magretti, 1908 - Ethiopia
- Brachygaster bidentata Kieffer, 1911 - Afrotropical
- Brachygaster bleusei Pic, 1923
- Brachygaster conjugens Enderlein, 1909
- Brachygaster globiceps Benoit, 1953 - Democratic Republic of the Congo
- Brachygaster gussakovskiji Belokobylskij, 2019
- Brachygaster minutus (Olivier, 1792) - Western Palearctic
- Brachygaster murrayorum Elliott, 2005
- Brachygaster notauliferus Benoit, 1953 - Democratic Republic of the Congo
- Brachygaster tschekylli Madl, 1989
