= Instar =

Inter-moult developmental stage of ecdysozoans

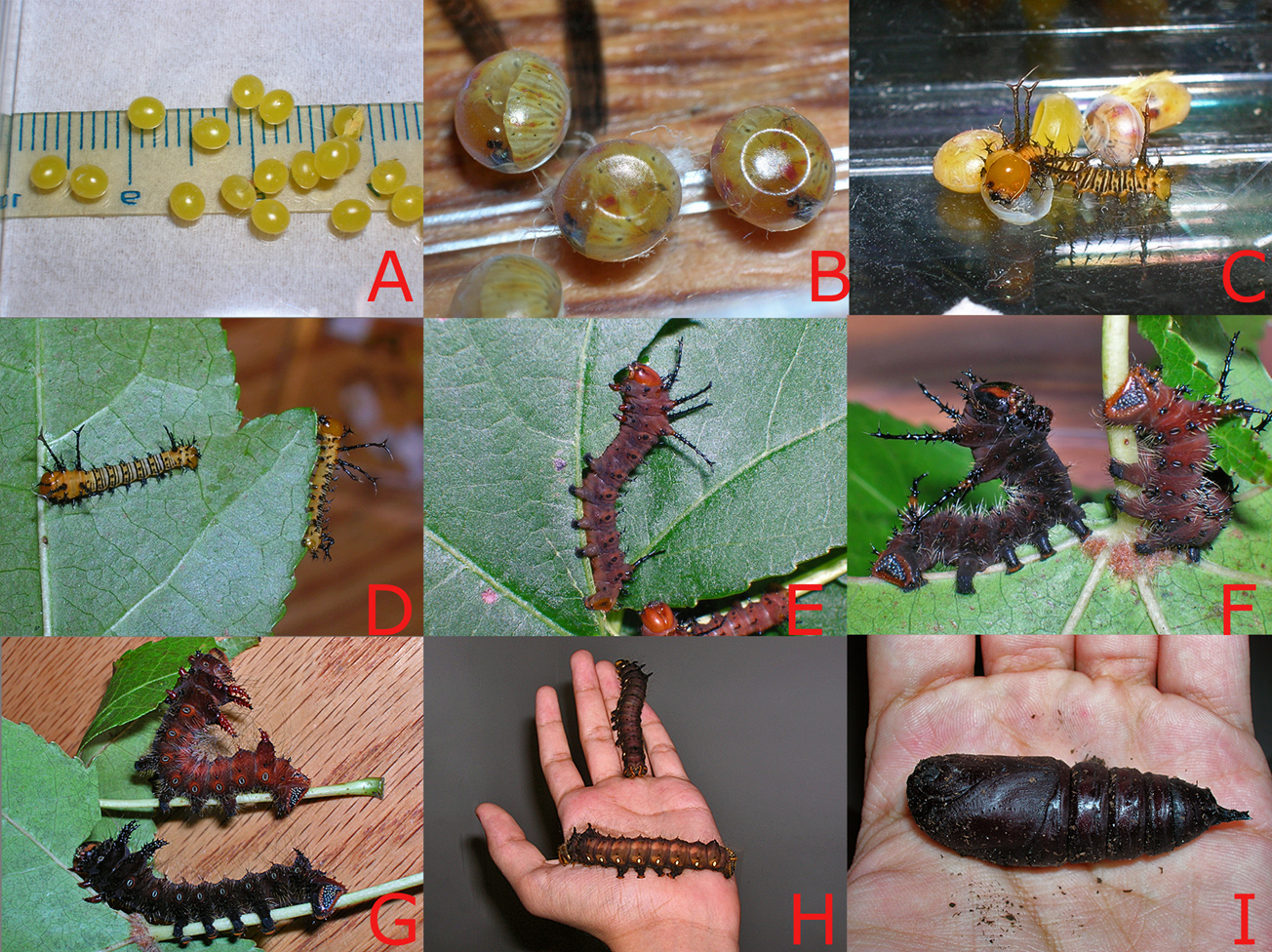
Imperial moth (Eacles imperialis) development from egg to pupa, showing all the different instars

An instar (/ˈɪnstɑːr/; from Latin īnstar 'form, likeness') is a developmental stage of ecdysozoans, such as arthropods, which occurs between each moult (ecdysis) until sexual maturity is reached. Arthropods must shed the exoskeleton in order to grow or assume a new form. Differences between instars can often be seen in altered body proportions, colors, patterns, changes in the number of body segments or head width.

After shedding their exoskeleton (moulting), the juvenile arthropods continue in their life cycle until they either pupate or moult again. The instar period of growth is fixed; however, in some insects, like the salvinia stem-borer moth, the number of instars depends on early larval nutrition. Some arthropods can continue to moult after sexual maturity, but the stages between these subsequent moults are generally not called instars.

For insects, "instar" refers to each developmental stage of larvae of holometabolous insects or nymphs of hemimetabolous insects, but an instar can be any developmental stage including pupa or imago.

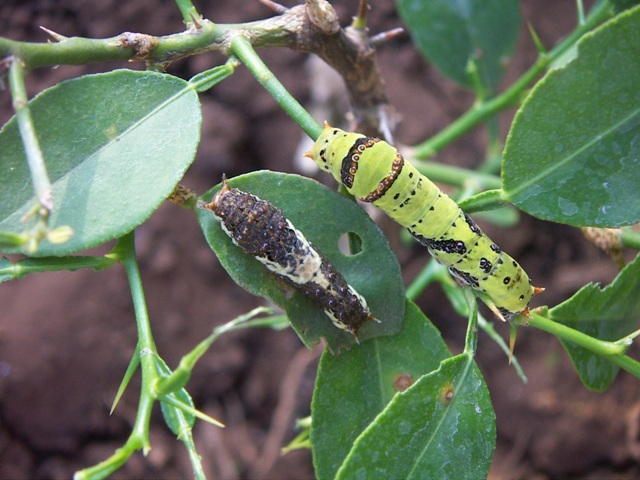
Two instars of a caterpillar of Papilio polytes

The number of instars an insect undergoes often depends on the species and the environmental conditions, as described for a number of species of Lepidoptera. However, it is believed that the number of instars can be physiologically constant per species in some insect orders, as for example Diptera and Hymenoptera. The number of larval instars is not directly related to the speed of development. For instance, environmental conditions may dramatically affect the developmental rates of species and still have no impact on the number of larval instars. As examples, lower temperatures and lower humidity often slow the rate of development and that may have an effect on how many molts an insect will undergo – an example of this is seen in the lepidopteran tobacco budworm.

On the other hand, temperature affects the development rates of a number of hymenopterans without affecting numbers of instars or larval morphology, as observed in the ensign wasp and in the red imported fire ant. The number of larval instars in ants has been the subject of a number of recent investigations, and no instance of temperature-related variation in numbers of instars has yet been recorded.
