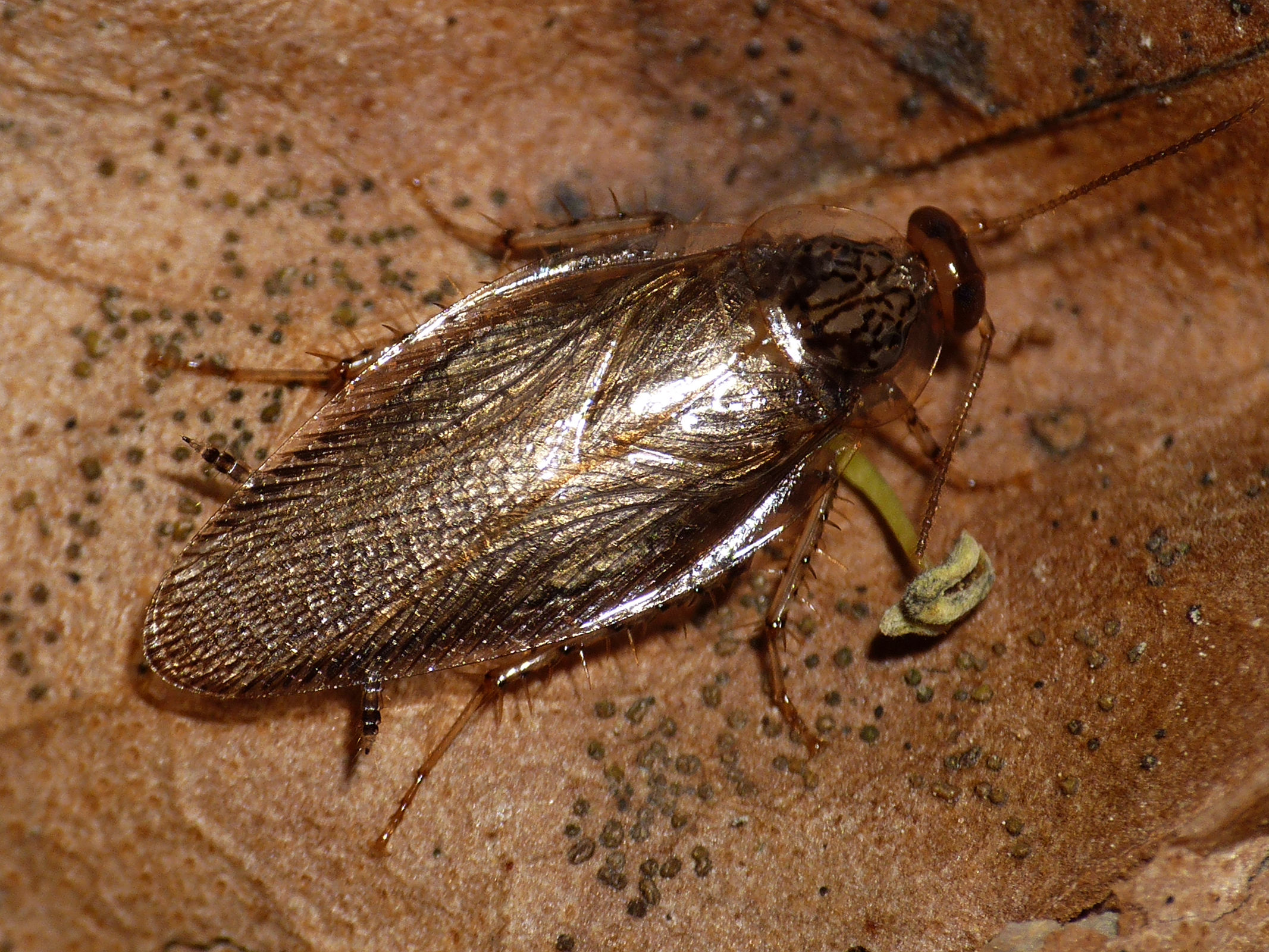
- Cariblatta sp. imago
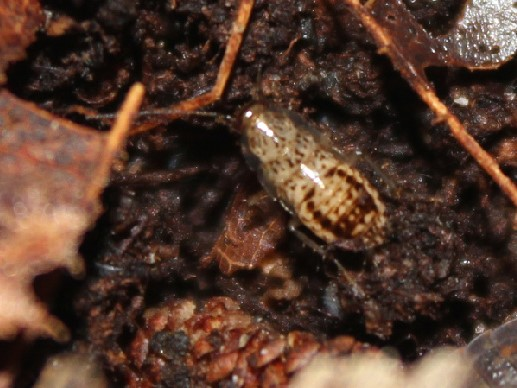
- Cariblatta lutea nymph wild-caught NC, USA

Scientific classification
- Kingdom: Animalia
- Phylum: Arthropoda
- Clade: Pancrustacea
- Class: Insecta
- Order: Blattodea
- Family: Ectobiidae
- Subfamily: Pseudophyllodromiinae
- Genus: Cariblatta; Hebard, 1916

= Cariblatta =

Genus of cockroaches

Cariblatta is a genus of cockroaches in the family Ectobiidae. There are more than 70 described of species in Cariblatta.

== Species ==
These 77 species belong to the genus Cariblatta:

- Cariblatta acreana Lopes & Oliveira, 2004
- Cariblatta advena Rehn, 1932
- Cariblatta aediculata Hebard, 1916
- Cariblatta alvarengai Lopes & Garcia, 2009
- Cariblatta antiguensis (Saussure & Zehntner, 1893)
- Cariblatta baiana Rocha e Silva, 1973
- Cariblatta binodosa Rocha e Silva, 1973
- Cariblatta bistylata Rocha e Silva & Lopes, 1975
- Cariblatta bodoqueniana Lopes & Garcia, 2009
- Cariblatta cacauensis Rocha e Silva & Lopes, 1975
- Cariblatta carioca Rocha e Silva & Lopes, 1975
- Cariblatta craticula Hebard, 1916
- Cariblatta cruenta Rocha e Silva & Lopes, 1977
- Cariblatta cryptobia Rehn & Hebard, 1927
- Cariblatta cuprea Hebard, 1916
- Cariblatta delicatula (Guérin-Méneville, 1857)
- Cariblatta duckeniana Lopes, Oliveira & Tarli, 2014
- Cariblatta elongata Rocha e Silva & Lopes, 1976
- Cariblatta exquisita Rocha e Silva & Lopes, 1975
- Cariblatta faticana Rehn, 1930
- Cariblatta fossicauda Hebard, 1916
- Cariblatta glochis Rehn & Hebard, 1927
- Cariblatta guadeloupensis Bonfils, 1969
- Cariblatta hebardi Rehn, 1945
- Cariblatta hylaea Rehn, 1945
- Cariblatta icarus Rehn, 1945
- Cariblatta igarapensis Rehn, 1918
- Cariblatta imitans Hebard, 1916
- Cariblatta imitatrix Rocha e Silva & Lopes, 1975
- Cariblatta inexpectata Rocha e Silva, 1973
- Cariblatta insignis Rocha e Silva, 1974
- Cariblatta insularis (Walker, 1868)
- Cariblatta invaginata Lopes & Garcia, 2009
- Cariblatta islacolonis Rehn & Hebard, 1927
- Cariblatta itapetinguensis Rocha e Silva, 1973
- Cariblatta jamaicensis Rehn & Hebard, 1927
- Cariblatta landalei Rehn & Hebard, 1927
- Cariblatta leucops Rehn & Hebard, 1927
- Cariblatta lutea (Saussure & Zehntner, 1893) (small yellow cockroach)
- Cariblatta magnifica Lopes & Oliveira, 2002
- Cariblatta manauensis Lopes, Oliveira & Tarli, 2014
- Cariblatta matogrossensis Rocha e Silva & Lopes, 1975
- Cariblatta mesembrina Hebard, 1921
- Cariblatta mineira (Rocha e Silva, 1955)
- Cariblatta minima Hebard, 1916 (least yellow cockroach)
- Cariblatta minustylata Lopes & Garcia, 2009
- Cariblatta mosela Rocha e Silva & Vasconcellos, 1987
- Cariblatta nebulicola Rehn & Hebard, 1927
- Cariblatta neocacauensis Rocha e Silva & Lopes, 1975
- Cariblatta neopunctipennis Rocha e Silva & Lopes, 1975
- Cariblatta nigra Rocha e Silva & Lopes, 1975
- Cariblatta orestera Rehn & Hebard, 1927
- Cariblatta pernambucana Rocha e Silva, 1974
- Cariblatta personata Rehn, 1916
- Cariblatta picturata Rehn & Hebard, 1927
- Cariblatta plagia Rehn & Hebard, 1927
- Cariblatta prima Rocha e Silva & Lopes, 1975
- Cariblatta punctipennis Hebard, 1916
- Cariblatta reticulosa (Walker, 1868)
- Cariblatta rustica Rocha e Silva, 1973
- Cariblatta seabrai Rocha e Silva & Lopes, 1975
- Cariblatta silvicola Rocha e Silva & Lopes, 1977
- Cariblatta sooretamensis (Rocha e Silva, 1963)
- Cariblatta spinicauda Hebard, 1929
- Cariblatta spinifera Lopes & Garcia, 2009
- Cariblatta spinostylata Lopes & Oliveira, 2002
- Cariblatta stenophrys Rehn & Hebard, 1927
- Cariblatta tetrastylata Lopes & Garcia, 2009
- Cariblatta tobagensis Hebard, 1929
- Cariblatta unguiculata Rehn & Hebard, 1927
- Cariblatta ungulata Rocha e Silva & Lopes, 1975
- Cariblatta unica Rocha e Silva & Lopes, 1975
- Cariblatta unystilata Lopes & Oliveira, 2004
- Cariblatta varia Rocha e Silva & Lopes, 1975
- Cariblatta venezuelana Princis, 1951
- Cariblatta vera Rocha e Silva & Lopes, 1975
- Cariblatta virgulina Rocha e Silva & Lopes, 1975
