= Praeaulacidae =

Praeaulacidae Temporal range: Callovian–Cenomanian

Scientific classification
- Kingdom: Animalia
- Phylum: Arthropoda
- Clade: Pancrustacea
- Class: Insecta
- Order: Hymenoptera
- Suborder: Apocrita
- Superfamily: Evanioidea
- Family: †Praeaulacidae; Rasnitsyn 1972

Subfamilies and genera
- See text

Extinct family of wasps

Praeaulacidae is an extinct family of Mesozoic parasitic wasps in the suborder Evanioidea. It among the earliest known families of the group and is characterised by more complete wing venation in comparison to other members of the suborder. It has been found that Othniodellithidae is nested within Praeaulacidae via cladistic analysis.

== Genera ==
Taxonomy according to Jouault et al, 2020

- †Albiogonalys Nel et al. 2003 Charentese amber, France, Late Cretaceous (Cenomanian)
- †subfamily Cretocleistogastrinae Rasnitsyn 1990
  - †Cretocleistogaster Rasnitsyn 1975 Zaza Formation, Turga Formation, Russia, Early Cretaceous (Aptian)
  - †Miniwestratia Rasnitsyn 1990 Dzun-Bain Formation, Mongolia, Aptian
  - †Nanowestratia Rasnitsyn 1990, Zaza Formation, Russia, Aptian
  - †Sinowestratia Zhang and Zheng 2000 Yixian Formation, China, Aptian
  - †Westratia Jell and Duncan 1986 Tsagaantsav Formation, Mongolia, Early Cretaceous (Hauterivian/Barremian) Koonwarra Fossil Bed, Australia, Aptian Dzun-Bain Formation, Mongolia, Aptian Zaza Formation, Gidarinskaya Formation, Russia, Aptian
- †subfamily Nevaniinae Zhang and Rasnitsyn 2007
  - †Eonevania Rasnitsyn and Zhang 2010 Daohugou, China, Middle Jurassic (Callovian)
  - †Nevania Zhang and Rasnitsyn 2007 Daohugou, China, Callovian, Karabastau Formation, Kazakhstan, Late Jurassic
  - †Rasnitsevania Jouault et al. 2020 Burmese amber, Myanmar, Cenomanian
- †subfamily Praeaulacinae Rasnitsyn 1972
  - †Archaulacus Li et al. 2014 Daohugou, China, Callovian
  - †Aulacogastrinus Rasnitsyn 1983 Daohugou, China, Callovian, Karabastau Formation, Kazakhstan, Callovian/Oxfordian
  - †Eosaulacus Zhang and Rasnitsyn 2008 Daohugou, China, Callovian
  - †Evanigaster Rasnitsyn 1972 Karabastau Formation, Kazakhstan, Callovian/Oxfordian
  - †Evaniops Rasnitsyn 1972 Karabastau Formation, Kazakhstan, Callovian/Oxfordian
  - †Gulgonga Oberprieler et al. 2012 Talbragar Fossil Bed, Australia, Late Jurassic (Tithonian)
  - †Habraulacus Li et al. 2015 Burmese amber, Myanmar, Cenomanian
  - †Praeaulacinus Rasnitsyn 1972 Karabastau Formation, Kazakhstan, Callovian/Oxfordian
  - †Praeaulacites Rasnitsyn 1972 Karabastau Formation, Kazakhstan, Callovian/Oxfordian
  - †Praeaulacon Rasnitsyn 1972 Daohugou, China, Callovian, Karabastau Formation, Kazakhstan, Callovian/Oxfordian
  - †Praeaulacops Rasnitsyn 1972 Karabastau Formation, Kazakhstan, Callovian/Oxfordian
  - †Praeaulacus Rasnitsyn 1972 Daohugou, China, Callovian, Karabastau Formation, Kazakhstan, Callovian/Oxfordian, Shar Teg, Mongolia, Tithonian
  - ?†Sinaulacogastrinus Zhang and Rasnitsyn 2008 Daohugou, China, Callovian
  - ?†Sinevania Rasnitsyn and Zhang 2010 Daohugou, China, Callovian
  - †Archeogastrinus kachinensis Jouault & Rosse-Guillevic, 2023
- †Family Othniodellithidae Engel and Huang, 2016 (found to be nested within Praeaulacidae by cladistic analysis)
  - †Keradellitha Jouault, Maréchal, Wang & Perrichot, 2021 Burmese amber, Myanmar, Cenomanian
  - †Othniodellitha Engel and Huang, 2016 Burmese amber, Myanmar, Cenomanian
  - †Xenodellitha Engel, 2017, Burmese amber, Myanmar, Cenomanian
