= Karatavitidae =

Karatavitidae Temporal range: Pliensbachian–Oxfordian

Scientific classification
- Domain: Eukaryota
- Kingdom: Animalia
- Phylum: Arthropoda
- Class: Insecta
- Order: Hymenoptera
- Suborder: Symphyta
- Superfamily: †Karatavitoidea
- Family: †Karatavitidae; Rasnitsyn, 1963

Family of insects

Karatavitidae is an extinct family of sawflies, known from the Jurassic period, they are the only members of the superfamily Karatavitoidea. While once proposed to be grouped with the Orussoidea in the infraorder Orussomorpha, they are now considered to be the closest relatives of clade containing Orussoidea and Apocrita. There are about 7 genera in Karatavitidae.

== Genera ==
These seven genera belong to the family Karatavitidae:

- † Grimmaratavites Rasnitsyn, Ansorge & Zhang, 2006 Green Series, Germany, Early Jurassic (Toarcian)
- † Karatavites Rasnitsyn, 1963 Karabastau Formation Kazakhstan, Middle-Late Jurassic (Callovian/Oxfordian), Daohugou, China, Callovian
- † Postxiphydria Rasnitsyn & Zhang, 2010 Karabastau Formation Kazakhstan, Middle-Late Jurassic (Callovian/Oxfordian)
- † Postxiphydroides Rasnitsyn & Zhang, 2010 Daohugou, China, Callovian
- † Praeparyssites Rasnitsyn, Ansorge & Zhang, 2006 Daohugou, China, Callovian
- † Praeratavites Rasnitsyn, Ansorge & Zhang, 2006 Daohugou, China, Callovian
- † Praeratavitoides Rasnitsyn & Zhang, 2010 Daohugou, China, Callovian
