= Protoparevania =

Protoparevania Temporal range: Cretaceous

Scientific classification
- Kingdom: Animalia
- Phylum: Arthropoda
- Class: Insecta
- Order: Hymenoptera
- Family: Evaniidae
- Genus: †Protoparevania; Deans in Deans, Basibuyuk, Azar & Nel, 2004

Extinct genus of insects

Protoparevania is an extinct genus of Evaniidae from the Cretaceous, containing a single species, Protoparevania lourothi.
