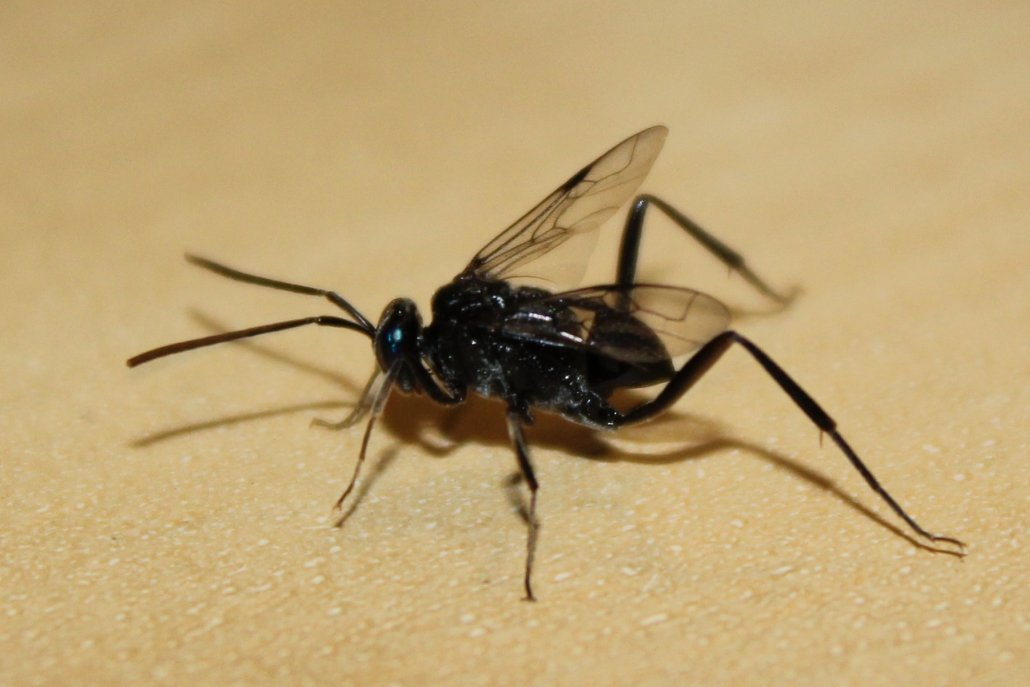

Scientific classification
- Kingdom: Animalia
- Phylum: Arthropoda
- Clade: Pancrustacea
- Class: Insecta
- Order: Hymenoptera
- Family: Evaniidae
- Genus: Evania
- Species: E. appendigaster

Binomial name
- Evania appendigaster (Linnaeus, 1758)

Synonyms
- Evania affinis Evania cubae Evania desjardinsi Evania laevigata Evania peringueyi Evania unicolor

= Evania appendigaster =

Species of wasp

Evania appendigaster, also known as the blue-eyed ensign wasp, is a species of wasp in the family Evaniidae. Its native range is not known, but it likely originated in Asia. Today it occurs throughout the tropics and subtropics and in many temperate regions. As with the rest of its family, the blue-eyed ensign wasp is a parasitoid known for specializing on cockroach eggs.

== Description ==
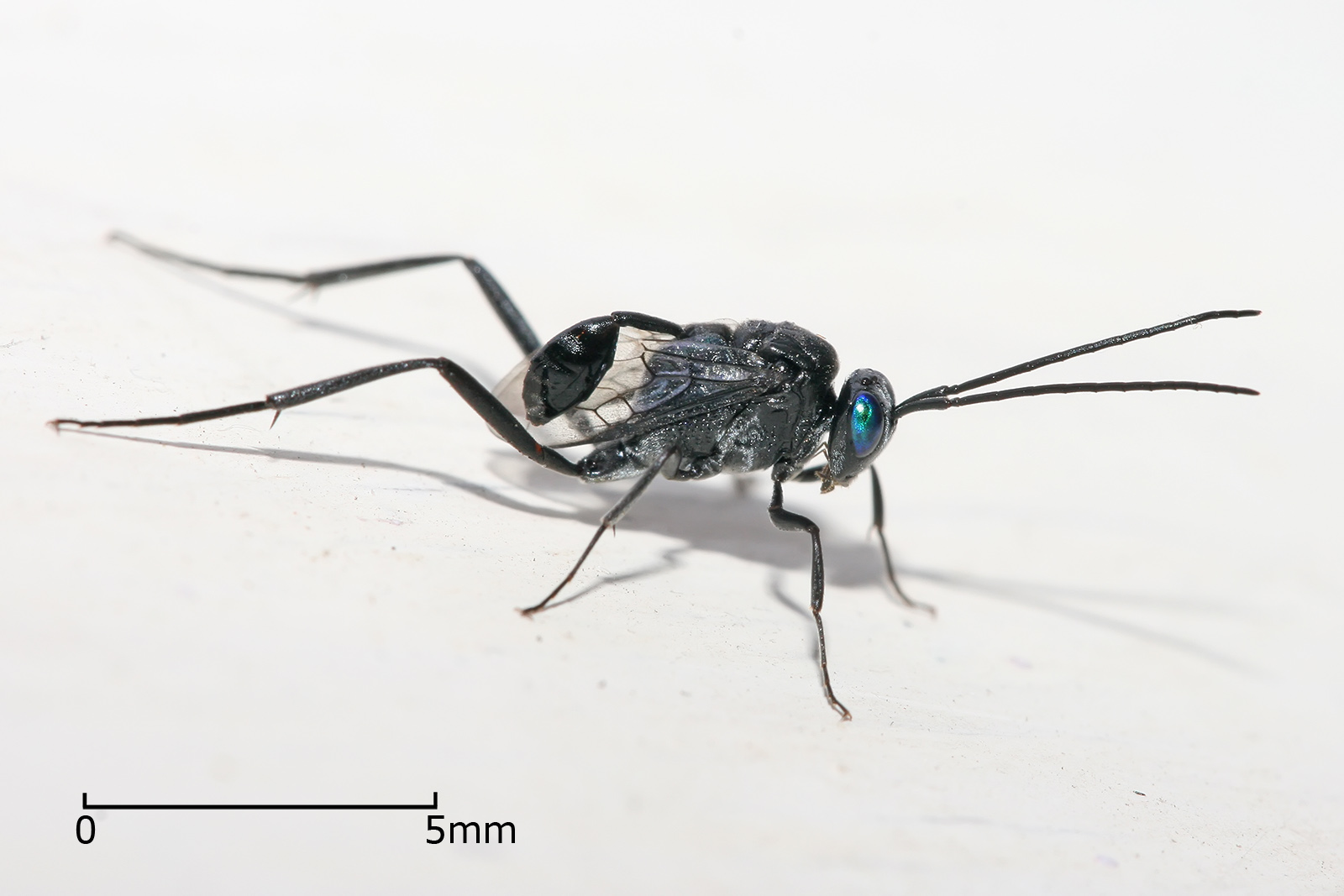
E. appendigaster, with the flaglike gaster clearly visible

This is one of the larger ensign wasps, with forewings up to about 7 millimeters long. It is distinguished from other species by the wide separation of the first and second sections of the coxa, the segment of the leg that attaches to the body. Its body is black in color with contrasting blue eyes. The abdominal petiole, the constricted stalk that holds the posterior section of the abdomen, or gaster, is attached high on the body. The gaster is laterally compressed and oval to nearly triangular in shape, held in a flaglike fashion and resembling an ensign, a characteristic of the family that inspired the common name ensign wasp.

== Biology ==
This wasp reproduces by laying eggs into egg cases, or oothecae, of cockroaches. The wasp larvae use the cockroach eggs as a food source. Host cockroaches include the American cockroach (Periplaneta americana), Australian cockroach (P. australasiae), brown cockroach (P. brunnea), Oriental cockroach (Blatta orientalis), whitemargined cockroach (Melanozosteria soror), and harlequin cockroach (Neostylopyga rhombifolia). The complete life cycle of the species is summarized on a video available online.

Detailed descriptions of the oviposition process in this species have been published. As one 1920 account describes it, "the Evaniid left the inside wall of the confining tumbler, ran over the Blattid ootheca, crawled over the surface momentarily as she actively vibrated her antenna and finally settled upon it with the long axis of her body parallel with the long axis of the egg mass as it lay upon its right side. Having satisfactorily settled herself, lying upon her right side she extended her ovipositor and crawling slightly forward she punctured the ootheca in the fifth egg cell of the left side, remaining in position for about fifteen minutes. She then left the egg mass and resting upon the inside wall of the tumbler actively cleaned the ovipositor, wings and antennae."

As a 1957 account describes the "peculiar" egg-laying behavior, "the female lies on her side and, with legs braced against the oötheca, penetrates the tough integument of the egg-capsule after about half-an-hour's hard labour." The process apparently requires "a good deal of hard work and much wriggling of the abdomen."

Other authors describe it as a seven-step process. The wasp lands on the ootheca and drums on it with her antennae. During step two, she extends her ovipositor and taps on the ootheca in several places for up to ten minutes, apparently searching for an appropriate site. After a rest period she begins "drilling", repeatedly inserting her ovipositor. Step five is the actual oviposition stage, in which wasps "just sit on ootheca and lay eggs". Steps six and seven are the withdrawal of the ovipositor and departure, respectively.

One egg is deposited in each cockroach egg capsule, and the wasp larva consumes all the eggs within it. The larva proceeds through five instars during development, stages which are distinguished by the changes in the unique mandibles. The first instar has mandibles with small, sharp teeth which it must use to open the tough cockroach eggs. During the next two instars, the larva has longer mandibles which are "shaped like a gauntlet glove" with three teeth. The final two instars have thicker mandibles with a long, blunt upper tooth and a narrow, curving lower tooth.

When the larva reaches about 8 millimeters in length it pupates. Upon maturity it cuts a hole in the egg capsule and exits. The adult wasp lives for two or three weeks. It may spend some time on plants such as parsley and fennel.

Competitors include Aprostocetus hagenowii, another parasitoid wasp that attacks cockroach oothecae.

== Research ==
The larvae of the species have been described in minute details. The complete mitochondrial genome of this species has been sequenced.

The wasp may be a candidate for use as an agent of biological pest control of cockroaches. Control might be even better if the wasp were released along with A. hagenowii, which tends to have a higher rate of parasitism. The wasp can be bred in laboratory conditions for later release. The parasitizing capacity depends on the density of host oothecae. The development and parasitisation rates are temperature-dependent.
