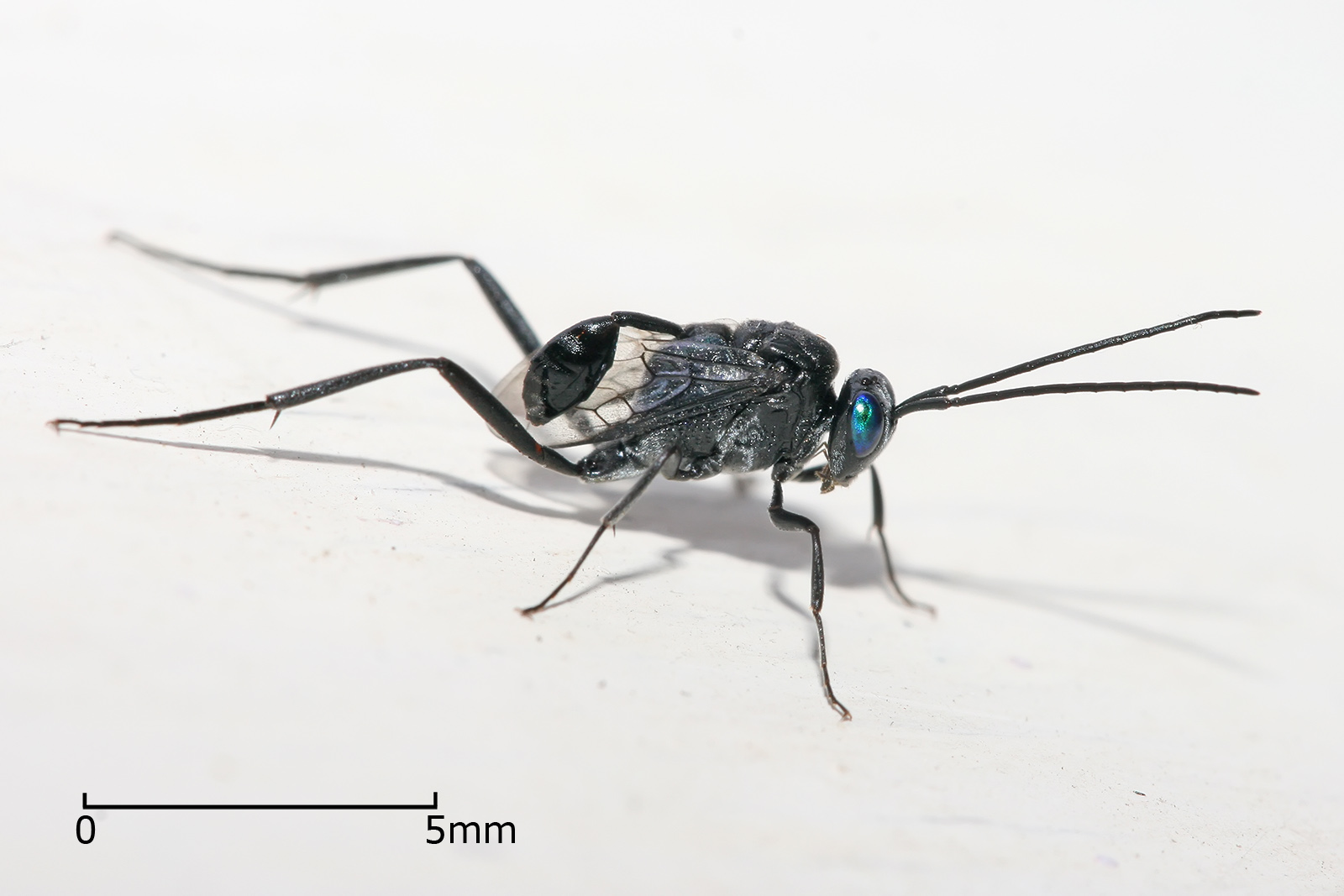
- Evania appendigaster (Evaniidae)
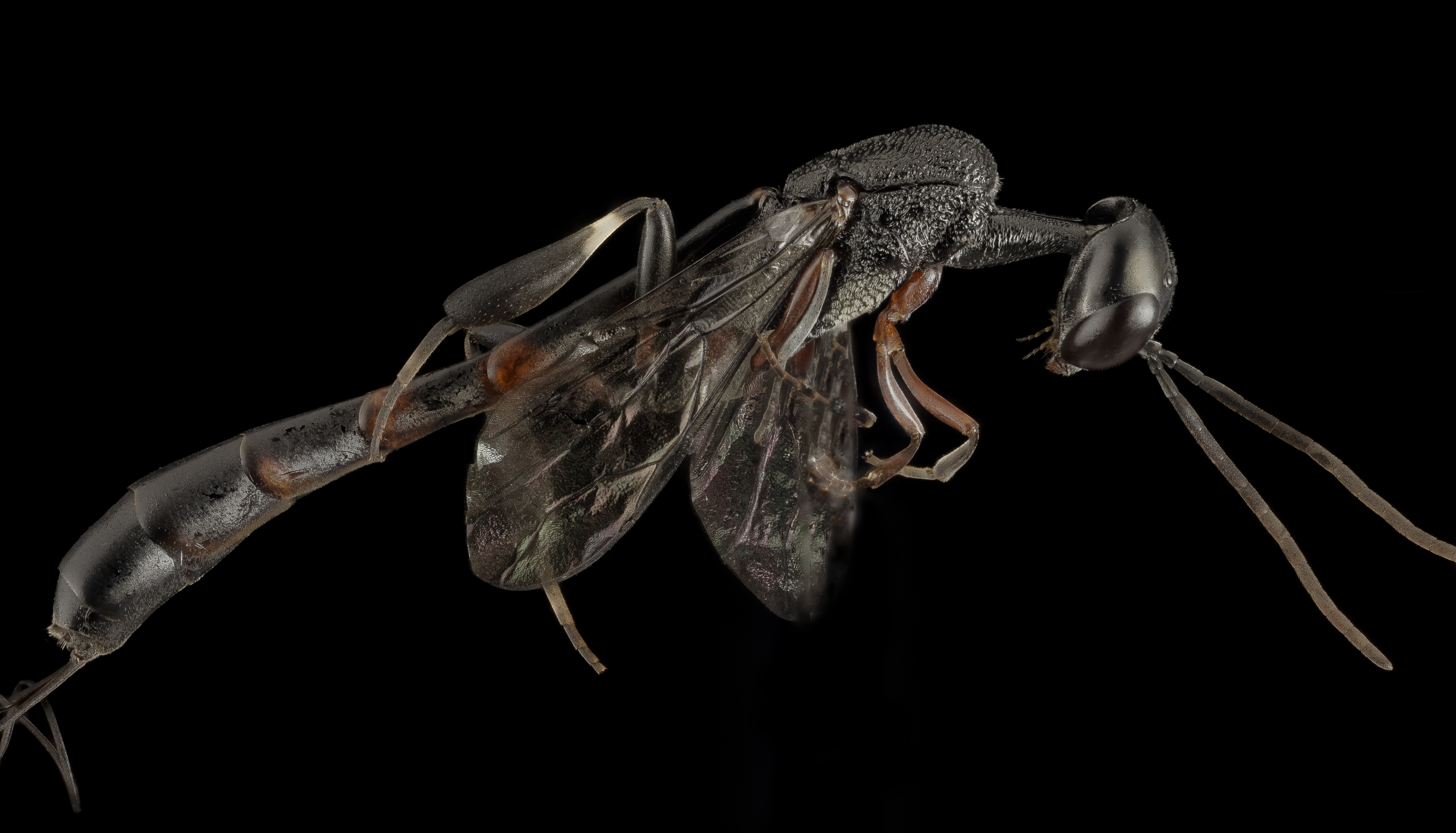
- Gasteruption (Gasteruptiidae)

Scientific classification
- Kingdom: Animalia
- Phylum: Arthropoda
- Clade: Pancrustacea
- Class: Insecta
- Order: Hymenoptera
- Suborder: Apocrita
- Superfamily: Evanioidea; Latreille, 1802

Families
- Aulacidae-Gasteruptiidae Clade; Aulacidae; Gasteruptiidae; Evaniidae †Anomopterellidae †Andreneliidae †Baissidae †Othniodellithidae †Praeaulacidae

= Evanioidea =

Evanioidea Temporal range: Middle Jurassic–Recent

Superfamily of wasps

The Evanioidea are a small hymenopteran superfamily that includes three extant families, two of which (Aulacidae and Gasteruptiidae) are much more closely related to one another than they are to the remaining family, Evaniidae. The rich fossil record, however, helps fill in the gaps between these lineages. They all share the trait of having the metasoma attached very high above the hind coxae on the propodeum.

It is a poorly known group as a whole, with some 1100 known species in total, and a great many species are still undescribed. While each of the three families differs in biology, within each family, they are remarkably uniform in appearance and habits.

The oldest records of the group date to the Middle Jurassic, and were diverse from the Middle Jurassic to mid Cretaceous, however, during the mid-Cretaceous they were overtaken in diversity by the Ichneumonoidea, and since the end of the Cretaceous have a relatively scant fossil record.

== Classification ==
Early-diverging families

Family †Praeaulacidae Rasnitsyn, 1975
Family †Nevaniidae Zhang & Rasnitsyn, 2007
Family †Othniodellithidae Engel & Huang, 2016

Neoevaniodes Engel, 2006

Family †Anomopterellidae Rasnitsyn, 1975

Aulaciformes Grimaldi & Engel, 2005

Family †Baissidae Rasnitsyn, 1975

Euaulacides Engel, 2006

Family Gasteruptiidae Ashmead, 1900

Subfamily †Hypselogastriinae Engel, 2016
Subfamily †Kotujellitinae Rasnitsyn, 1991
Subfamily Hyptiogastrinae Crosskey, 1953
Subfamily Gasteruptiinae Ashmead, 1900

Family Aulacidae Shuckard, 1841

Subfamily †Hyptiogastritinae Engel, 2006

Tribe †Archeofoenini Engel, 2017
Tribe †Hyptiogastritini Engel, 2006

Subfamily Aulacinae Shuckard, 1841

Tribe †Electrofoenini Cockerell, 1917
Tribe Aulacini Shuckard, 1841

Evaniiformes Grimaldi & Engel, 2005

Family Evaniidae Latreille, 1802
