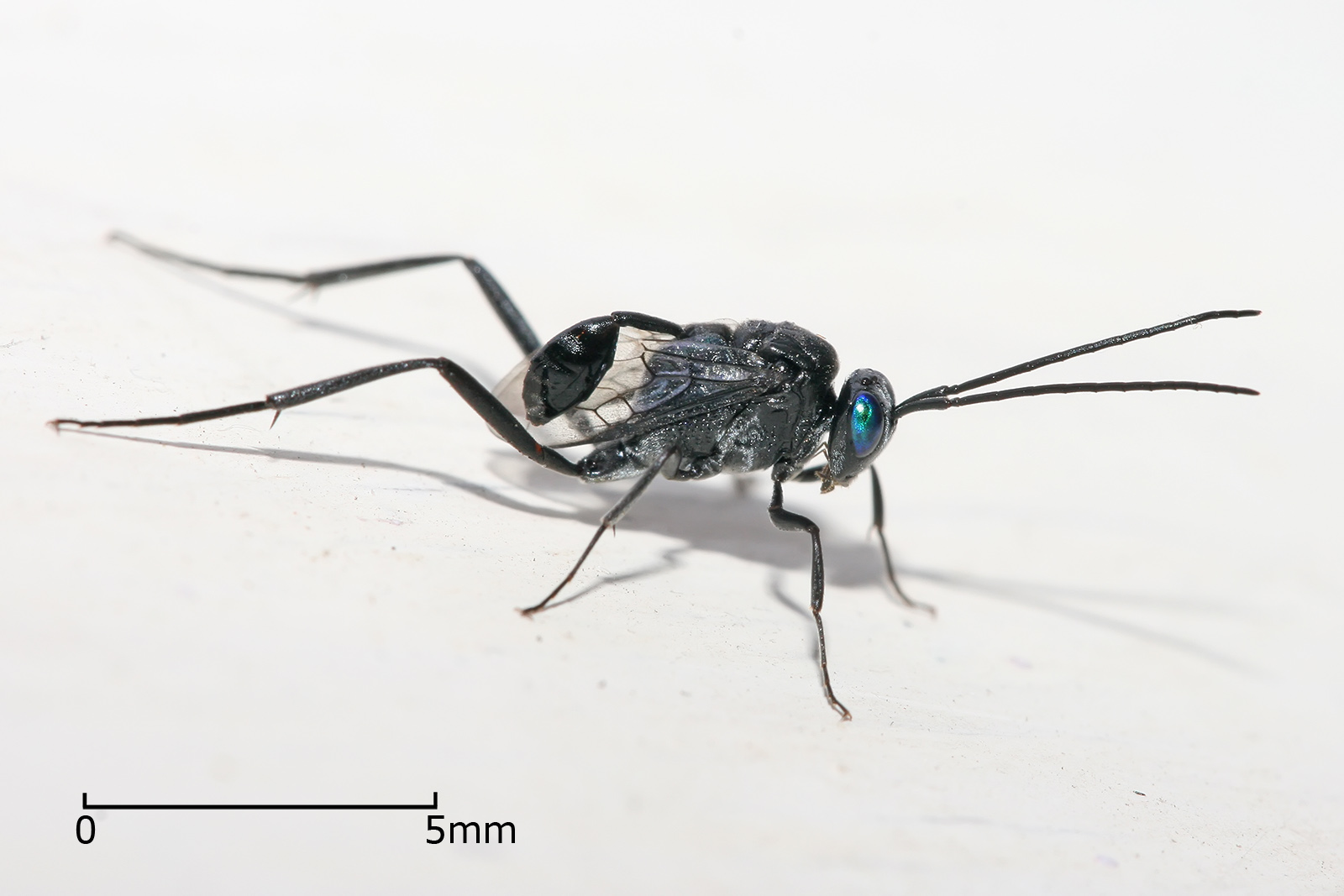
- Evania appendigaster (Evania)

Scientific classification
- Kingdom: Animalia
- Phylum: Arthropoda
- Clade: Pancrustacea
- Class: Insecta
- Order: Hymenoptera
- Superfamily: Evanioidea
- Family: Evaniidae; Latreille, 1802

Diversity
- Around 20 living genera

Synonyms
- Andreneliidae (but see text); Cretevaniidae

= Evaniidae =

Evaniidae Temporal range: Barremian–Present

Family of wasps

Evaniidae is a family of parasitoid wasps also known as ensign wasps, nightshade wasps, or hatchet wasps. They have a short abdomen and the gaster is often moved up and down as they walk giving rise to the common names. There are around 20 extant genera with over 400 described species, and are found all over the world except in the polar regions. The larvae of these solitary wasps are considered as egg predators develop inside the egg-cases, or oothecae, of their cockroach hosts.

== Description ==
Evaniidae have the metasoma attached very high above the hind coxae on the propodeum, and the metasoma itself is quite small, with a long, one-segmented, tube-like petiole, and compressed laterally over most of its length (segments 2–8). The ovipositor is short and thin. When active, these wasps jerk the metasoma up and down constantly, as referenced in their common names. The mesosoma is high, short, and heavily sclerotized, with a ridged and pitted surface. The head is largely immovable and attaches to the mesosoma on a short neck; with usually 13-segmented antennae that do not differ between males and females.

Apomorphies of ensign wasp wings and their venation are:

- deeply separated jugal lobes in fore- and hindwings
- loss of cross-veins on the distal forewing (though this is hard to determine in some)
- hindwings retain only medial, cubital, and part of the costal vein; all others have been lost

== Ecology ==
As far as is known, ensign wasp larvae are parasitoids on the eggs of cockroaches. However, good host data are only known for a fraction of this family, about 4% as of 2008, thus more unusual life history strategies likely exist. Host specificity and coevolution with roach lineages seem to have played a significant role in the evolution of some ensign wasp lineages. Others are less discriminating in their host choice, and will attack almost any ootheca (egg case) of a particular size.

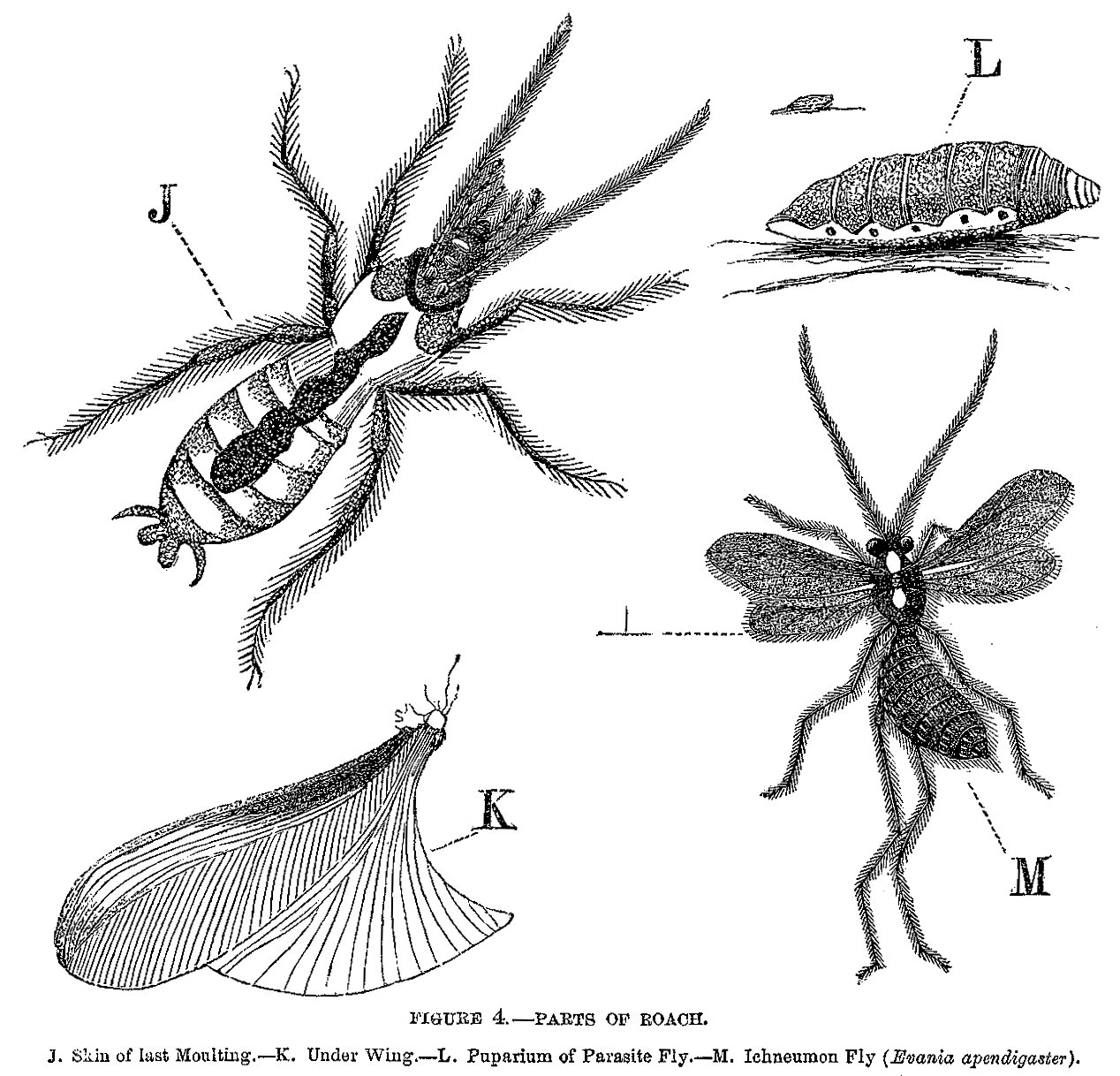
Illustration of Evania appendigaster (lower right) and its pupa (upper right) as parasitoids of the American cockroach (Periplaneta americana)

The female wasp lays an egg inside the roach ootheca, and the wasp larva hatches quickly and consumes the roach eggs. A single egg is laid per ootheca, into a host egg in some Evaniidae, and between the eggs in others. Some are able to oviposit even when the female cockroach still carries the fresh ootheca around, while other ensign wasps will only attack oothecae that are completed and have been dropped by the mother roach. The wasps seem to be able to determine if an ootheca is already used to host a larva, and refrain from depositing eggs in such cases; alternatively, the larvae might be cannibalistic, with the first to hatch in an ootheca eating any wasp eggs subsequently deposited.

Two Evaniidae species, Evania appendigaster and Prosevania fuscipes, have achieved an essentially worldwide distribution nowadays, having been introduced along with various Blattidae species of genera Blatta and Periplaneta. While they do feed on insects that are considered pests, they rarely attain population sizes sufficient to act as effective biocontrol agents. As cockroaches are typically more abundant in and around human settlements, Evaniidae are a regular sight in such habitat where many other wasps are absent, and are frequently encountered in buildings looking for prey. The adults drink nectar from flowers and neither they nor the larvae are dangerous or harmful to humans.

== Systematics and taxonomy ==
Before 1939, the Evaniidae were a "wastebin taxon" for any parasitoid wasp with unusual morphology. Among these were the more apomorphic and less diverse (but about equally speciose) taxa now placed in the Aulacidae and Gasteruptiidae, which together with ensign wasps make up the superfamily Evanioidea. These were formerly a part of the paraphyletic "Parasitica", ranked as an infraorder. But the parasitoid wasp lineages are not more closely related among themselves than they are related to non-parasitoid wasps, thus the "Parasitica" are an obsolete group.

Rather, the Evanioidea seem to be close relatives of the Megalyroidea, Trigonaloidea, and particularly the Ceraphronoidea. These four superfamilies seem to make up a clade, which could be considered one of several infraorders to replace the superseded "Parasitica".

=== Living genera ===
The living ensign wasp genera can be divided into one larger and four smaller groups, which might be considered subfamilies. Some genera are hard to place in these, though; they probably represent minor lineages of a more basal position. The groups, with genera sorted according to the presumed relationship, are:

Basal genera

- Afrevania Benoit, 1953
- Brachevania Turner, 1927
- Vernevania

Thaumatevania group

- Thaumatevania Ceballos, 1935
- Micrevania Benoit, 1952

Zeuxevania group

- Papatuka Deans, 2002
- Parevania Kieffer, 1907 (might belong in Zeuxevania)
- Zeuxevania Kieffer, 1902

Evania group

- Evania Fabricius, 1775
- Prosevania Kieffer, 1911
- Trissevania Kieffer, 1913

Evaniella group

- Acanthinevania Bradley, 1908 (might belong in Evaniella)
- Evaniella Bradley, 1905 (Note: "1908" is lapsus in Deans (2008))
- Szepligetella Bradley, 1908 (might belong in Evaniella)
- Alobevania Kawada & Deans, 2008

Hyptia group

- Brachygaster Leach, 1815
- Semaeomyia Bradley, 1908
- Decevania Huben, 2003
- Evaniscus Szépligeti, 1903
- Hyptia Illiger, 1807
- Rothevania Philippi, 1871

=== Fossil record ===
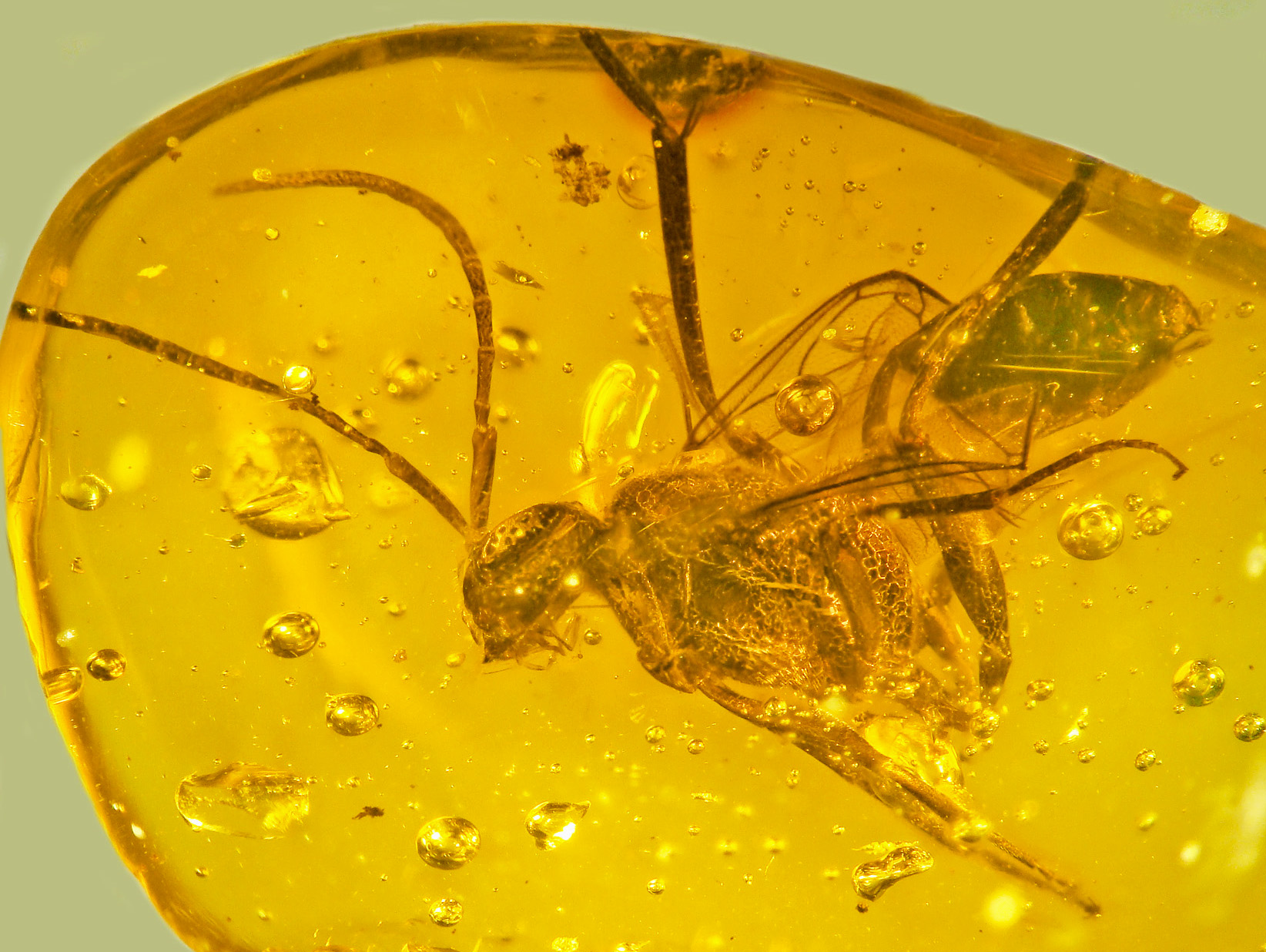
Ensign wasp in amber

Ensign wasps likely originated over 150 million years ago. Overall, they are successful organisms, existing since the time dinosaurs roamed the Earth with little change in morphology and, presumably, ecology. The fossil record, in particular from fossil amber, is quite comprehensive, with about 10 genera and twice as many species known from the Late Jurassic up to a few million years ago. The primitive Mesozoic genera Andrenelia, Botsvania, and Praevania are only tentatively identified as Evaniidae at present; the first was once separated as family Andreneliidae.

Evaniidae seem to have undergone significant evolutionary radiation in the Cretaceous; these taxa were separated as Cretevaniidae, but seem to be a subfamily if anything. The main lineages of extant ensign wasps probably were well separated by the mid-Paleogene. Few Evaniidae have been found in deposits dating from the Paleogene, however, and the ancestry of the living genera consequently remains not well documented. Eoevania and Protoparevania seem to be closer to the living lineages than earlier fossils.

Ensign wasp genera known only from fossils are:

- Andrenelia Rasnitsyn & Martinez-Delclos, 2000 La Pedrera de Rúbies Formation, Spain, Barremian
- Botsvania Rasnitsyn & Brothers, 2007 Orapa, Botswana, Turonian
- Burmaevania Shih et al 2020 Burmese amber, Cenomanian
- Cretevania Rasnitsyn, 1975 (incl. Eovernevania & Procretevania) Weald Clay, United Kingdom, Barremian Yixian Formation, China Dzun-Bain Formation, Mongolia, Aptian, Spanish amber, Escucha Formation, Albian, Burmese amber, Cenomanian, Taimyr Amber, Santonian
- Curtevania Li & Rasnitsyn & Ren, 2018 Burmese amber, Cenomanian
- Dominicana Poinar 2020 Dominican amber, Miocene
- Eoevania Nel, Waller, Hodebert & De Ploeg, 2002 Oise amber, France, Eocene
- Hispaniola Poinar 2020 Dominican amber, Miocene
- Grimaldivania Basibuyuk, Fitton & Rasnitsyn in Basibuyuk, Rasnitsyn, Fitton & Quicke, 2000 New Jersey amber, Turonian
- Iberoevania Peñalver et al., 2010 Spanish amber, Escucha Formation, Spain, Albian
- Lebanevania Basibuyuk & Rasnitsyn in Basibuyuk, Rasnitsyn, Fitton & Quicke, 2002 Lebanese amber, Barremian (considered questionable by Shih et al 2019)
- Mexicana Poinar 2020 Mexican amber, Miocene
- Mesevania Basibuyuk & Rasnytsin in Basibuyuk, Rasnitsyn, Fitton & Quicke, 2000 Burmese amber, Cenomanian (considered questionable by Shih et al 2019)
- Newjersevania Basibuyuk, Quicke & Rasnitsyn in Basibuyuk, Rasnitsyn, Fitton & Quicke, 2000 Burmese amber, Cenomanian New Jersey amber, Turonian
- Praevania Rasnitsyn 1991 Dzun-Bain Formation, Mongolia, Aptian
- Protoparevania Deans in Deans, Basibuyuk, Azar & Nel, 2004 Lebanese amber, Barremian
- Setifera Poinar 2020 Dominican amber, Miocene
- Sorellevania Engel, 2006 Burmese amber, Cenomanian
- Sinuevania Li & Rasnitsyn & Ren, 2018 Burmese amber, Cenomanian
