= A. feai =

A. feai may refer to:

- Abacetus feai, a ground beetle
- Aderus feai, an ant-like leaf beetle found in Cape Verde
- Anisocerus feai, a longhorn beetle
- Augyles feai, a variegated mud-loving beetle found in Asia
