= Augyles ivojenisi =

Scientific classification
- Kingdom: Animalia
- Phylum: Arthropoda
- Class: Insecta
- Order: Coleoptera
- Suborder: Polyphaga
- Infraorder: Elateriformia
- Family: Heteroceridae
- Genus: Augyles
- Species: A. ivojenisi

Binomial name
- Augyles ivojenisi (Mascagni, 1995)

Synonyms
- Littorimus ivojenisi Mascagni, 1995

Species of beetle

Augyles ivojenisi, is a species of variegated mud-loving beetle found in India, Nepal, Myanmar and Sri Lanka.
