= Elonus nebulosus =

Scientific classification
- Kingdom: Animalia
- Phylum: Arthropoda
- Class: Insecta
- Order: Coleoptera
- Suborder: Polyphaga
- Infraorder: Cucujiformia
- Family: Aderidae
- Genus: Elonus
- Species: E. nebulosus

Binomial name
- Elonus nebulosus (LeConte, 1875)

Synonyms
- Xylophilus nebulosus LeConte, 1875

Species of beetle

Elonus nebulosus is a species of ant-like leaf beetle in the family Aderidae. It is found in North America.
