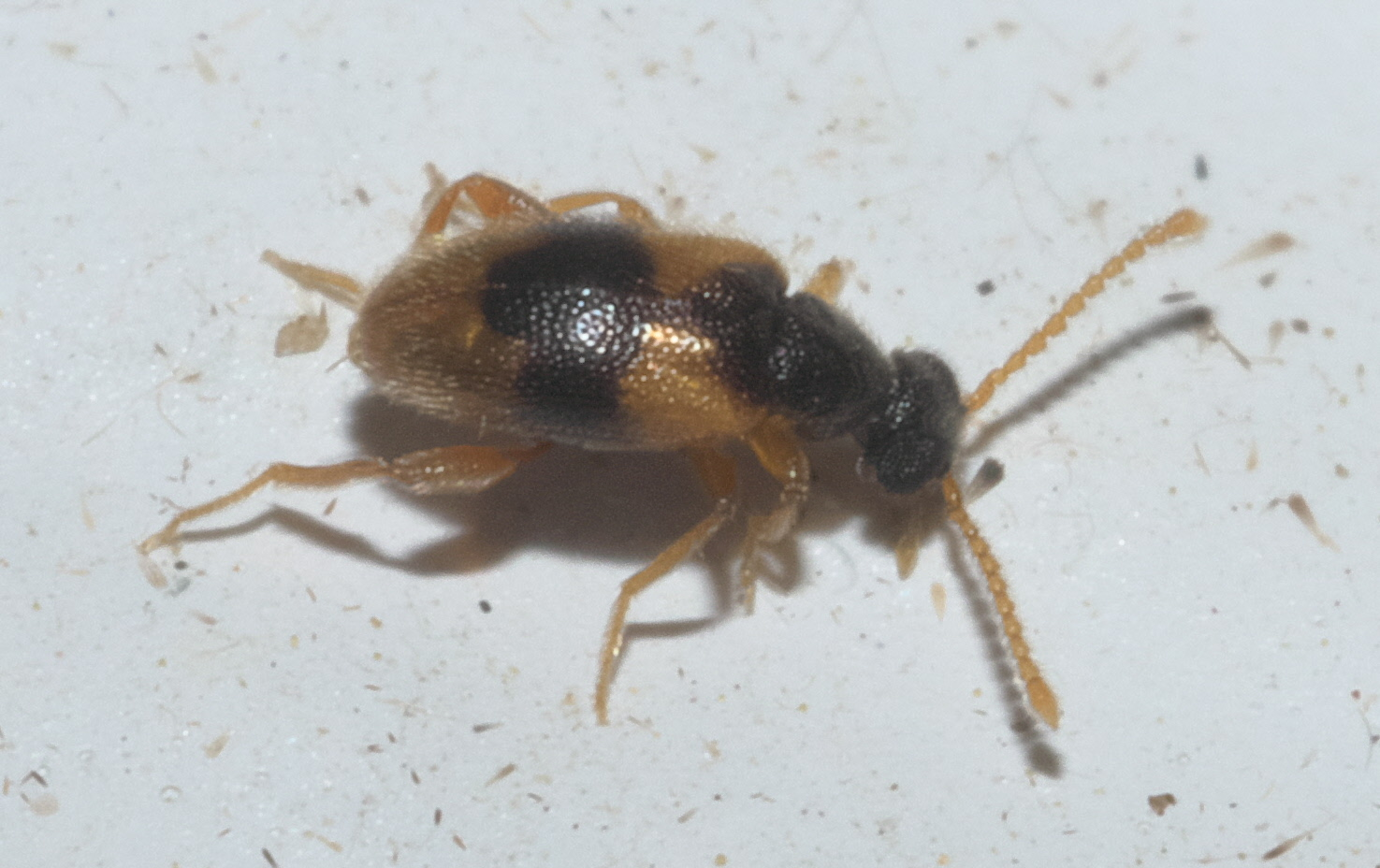

Scientific classification
- Domain: Eukaryota
- Kingdom: Animalia
- Phylum: Arthropoda
- Class: Insecta
- Order: Coleoptera
- Suborder: Polyphaga
- Infraorder: Cucujiformia
- Family: Aderidae
- Tribe: Euglenesini
- Genus: Syzeton; Blackburn, 1891

Type species
- Syzeton laetus Blackburn, 1891

Synonyms
- Hylophilus; Zonantes Casey, 1895

= Syzeton =

Genus of beetles

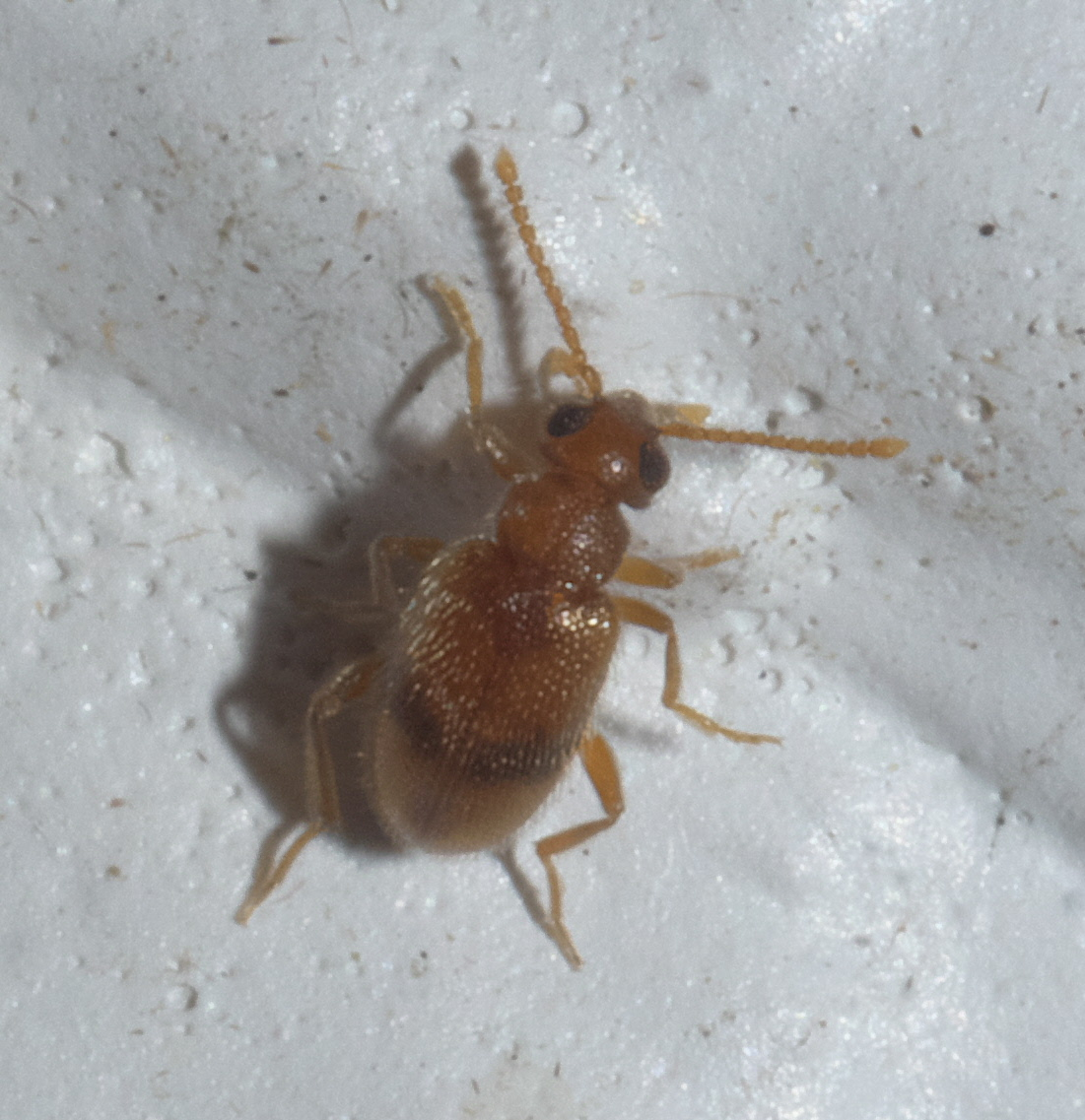

Syzeton is a genus of ant-like leaf beetles in the family Aderidae. There are more than 10 described species in Syzeton.

The species of Syzeton were formerly members of the genus Zonantes. In 2022, research was published moving the species to the genus Syzeton.

== Species ==
These 12 species belong to the genus Zonantes:

- Syzeton arizonae Gompel, 2022
- Syzeton ater (LeConte, 1875)
- Syzeton belovi Gompel, 2022
- Syzeton fasciatus (Melsheimer, 1846)
- Syzeton floridanus (Werner, 1990)
- Syzeton gruberi Gompel, 2022
- Syzeton hubbardi (Casey, 1895)
- Syzeton nubifer (LeConte, 1878)
- Syzeton ouachitanus (Werner, 1990)
- Syzeton pallidus (Werner, 1990)
- Syzeton signatus (Haldeman, 1848)
- Syzeton subfasciatus (LeConte, 1875)
