= Ganascus ventricosus =

Scientific classification
- Kingdom: Animalia
- Phylum: Arthropoda
- Class: Insecta
- Order: Coleoptera
- Suborder: Polyphaga
- Infraorder: Cucujiformia
- Family: Aderidae
- Genus: Ganascus
- Species: G. ventricosus

Binomial name
- Ganascus ventricosus (LeConte, 1875)

Synonyms
- Ganascus opimus Casey, 1895; Ganascus palliatus Casey, 1895; Xylophilus ventricosus LeConte, 1875

Species of beetle

Ganascus ventricosus is a species of ant-like leaf beetle in the family Aderidae. It is found in North America.
