= Aderus tantillus =

Scientific classification
- Domain: Eukaryota
- Kingdom: Animalia
- Phylum: Arthropoda
- Class: Insecta
- Order: Coleoptera
- Suborder: Polyphaga
- Infraorder: Cucujiformia
- Family: Aderidae
- Genus: Aderus
- Species: A. tantillus

Binomial name
- Aderus tantillus (Champion, 1890)

Species of beetle

Aderus tantillus is a species of ant-like leaf beetle in the family Aderidae. It is found in Central America and North America.
