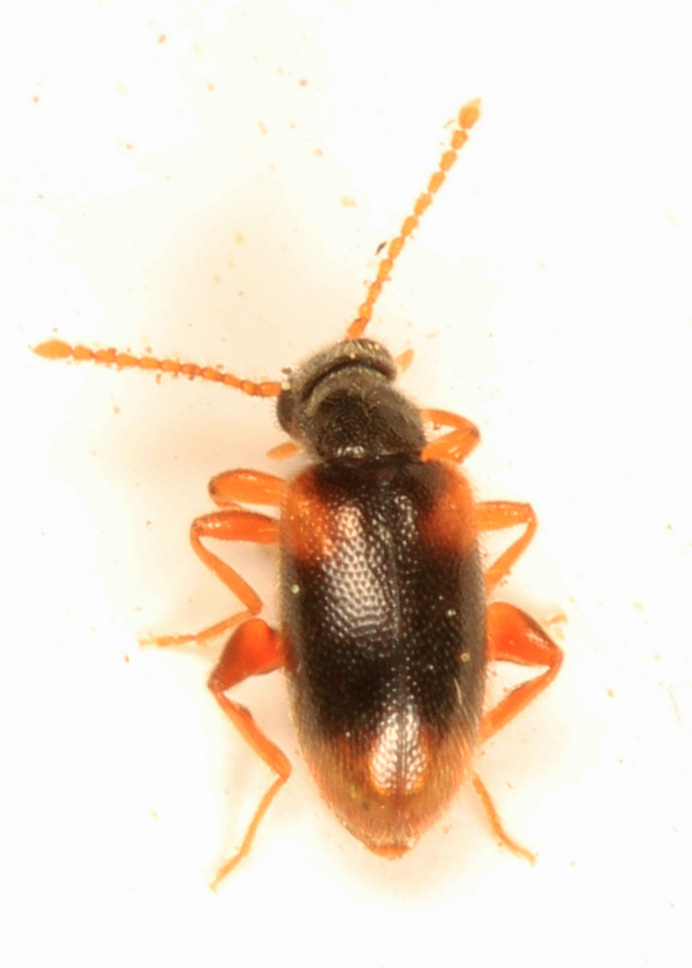

Scientific classification
- Domain: Eukaryota
- Kingdom: Animalia
- Phylum: Arthropoda
- Class: Insecta
- Order: Coleoptera
- Suborder: Polyphaga
- Infraorder: Cucujiformia
- Family: Aderidae
- Genus: Syzeton
- Species: S. fasciatus

Binomial name
- Syzeton fasciatus (Melsheimer, 1846)

Synonyms
- Zonantes fasciatus (Melsheimer, 1846); Xylophilus fasciatus Melsheimer, 1846; Zonantes tricuspis Casey, 1895

= Syzeton fasciatus =

Species of beetle

Syzeton fasciatus is a species of ant-like leaf beetle in the family Aderidae. It is found in North America.

This species was formerly a member of the genus Zonantes. The species of that genus were transferred to the genus Syzeton as a result of research published in 2022.
