= Augyles letovi =

Scientific classification
- Kingdom: Animalia
- Phylum: Arthropoda
- Class: Insecta
- Order: Coleoptera
- Suborder: Polyphaga
- Infraorder: Elateriformia
- Family: Heteroceridae
- Genus: Augyles
- Species: A. letovi

Binomial name
- Augyles letovi Sazhnev, 2018

Species of beetle

Augyles letovi is a species of beetle in the family Heteroceridae. The insect is named after Russian singer-songwriter Yegor Letov, the leader of the rock band Grazhdanskaya Oborona.

The beetle was discovered in Vietnam in 1976. In 2018, the species was described by Russian entomologist Alexey Sazhnev from Papanin Institute of Biology of Inland Waters.

The beetle is light brown with yellowish spots on the back.
