= Vanonus vigilans =

Scientific classification
- Kingdom: Animalia
- Phylum: Arthropoda
- Class: Insecta
- Order: Coleoptera
- Suborder: Polyphaga
- Infraorder: Cucujiformia
- Family: Aderidae
- Genus: Vanonus
- Species: V. vigilans

Binomial name
- Vanonus vigilans Casey, 1895

Species of beetle

Vanonus vigilans is a species of ant-like leaf beetle in the family Aderidae. It is found in North America.
