= Heterocerus unicus =

Scientific classification
- Domain: Eukaryota
- Kingdom: Animalia
- Phylum: Arthropoda
- Class: Insecta
- Order: Coleoptera
- Suborder: Polyphaga
- Infraorder: Elateriformia
- Family: Heteroceridae
- Genus: Heterocerus
- Species: H. unicus

Binomial name
- Heterocerus unicus Miller, 1988

Species of beetle

Heterocerus unicus is a species in the family Heteroceridae ("variegated mud-loving beetles"), in the order Coleoptera ("beetles"). The distribution range of Heterocerus unicus includes Central America and North America.
