= Vanonus piceus =

Scientific classification
- Domain: Eukaryota
- Kingdom: Animalia
- Phylum: Arthropoda
- Class: Insecta
- Order: Coleoptera
- Suborder: Polyphaga
- Infraorder: Cucujiformia
- Family: Aderidae
- Genus: Vanonus
- Species: V. piceus

Binomial name
- Vanonus piceus (LeConte, 1855)

Synonyms
- Vanonus congener Casey, 1905; Vanonus fusciceps Casey, 1905; Vanonus tuberculifer (Hamilton, 1893); Xilophilus tuberculifer Hamilton, 1893; Xylophilus piceus LeConte, 1855

Species of beetle

Vanonus piceus is a species of ant-like leaf beetle in the family Aderidae, found in North America.
