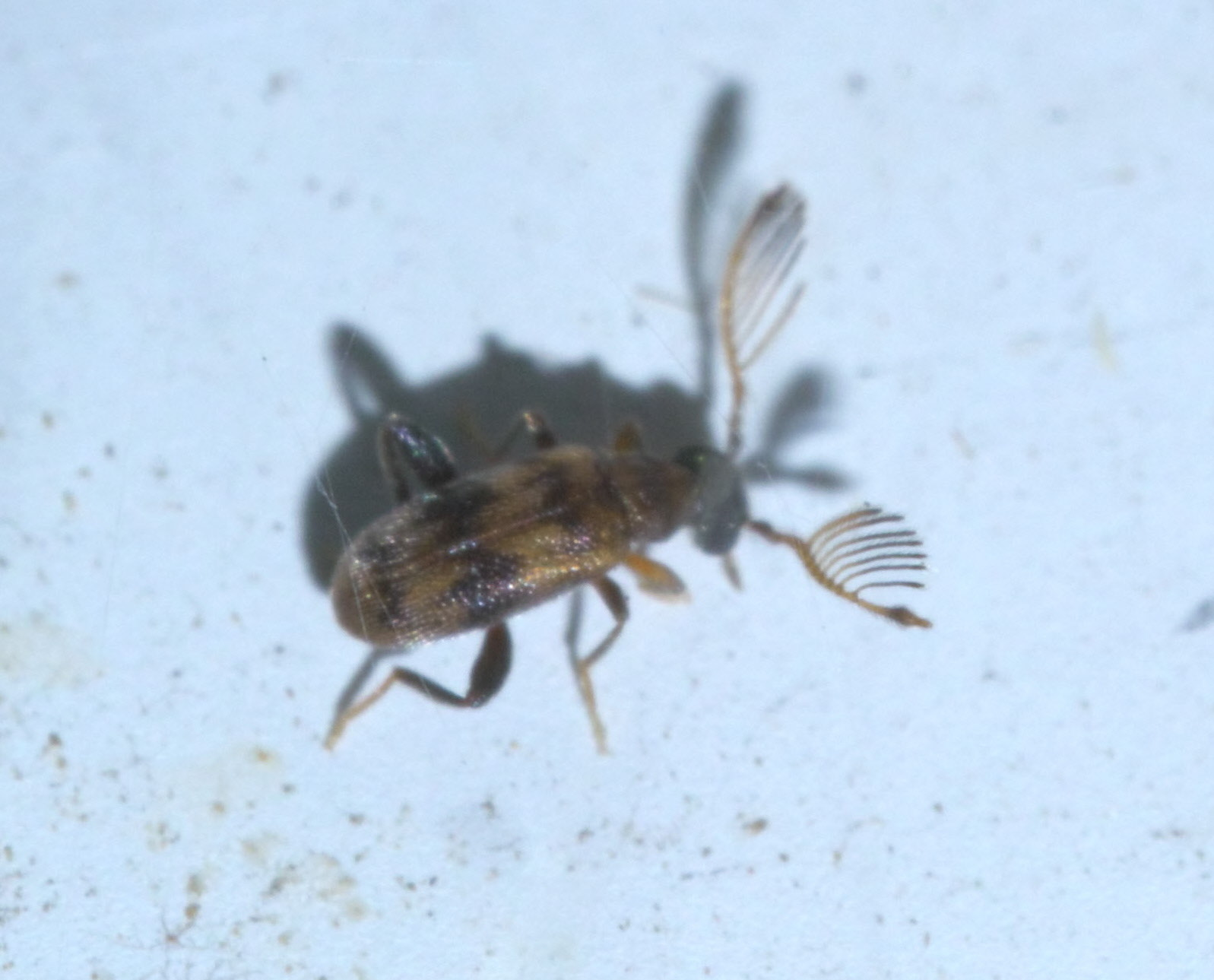

Scientific classification
- Domain: Eukaryota
- Kingdom: Animalia
- Phylum: Arthropoda
- Class: Insecta
- Order: Coleoptera
- Suborder: Polyphaga
- Infraorder: Cucujiformia
- Family: Aderidae
- Genus: Emelinus
- Species: E. melsheimeri

Binomial name
- Emelinus melsheimeri (LeConte, 1855)

Synonyms
- Emelinus ashmeadi Casey, 1895; Xylophilus melsheimeri LeConte, 1855

= Emelinus melsheimeri =

Species of beetle

Emelinus melsheimeri is a species of ant-like leaf beetle in the family Aderidae. It is found in Central America and North America.
