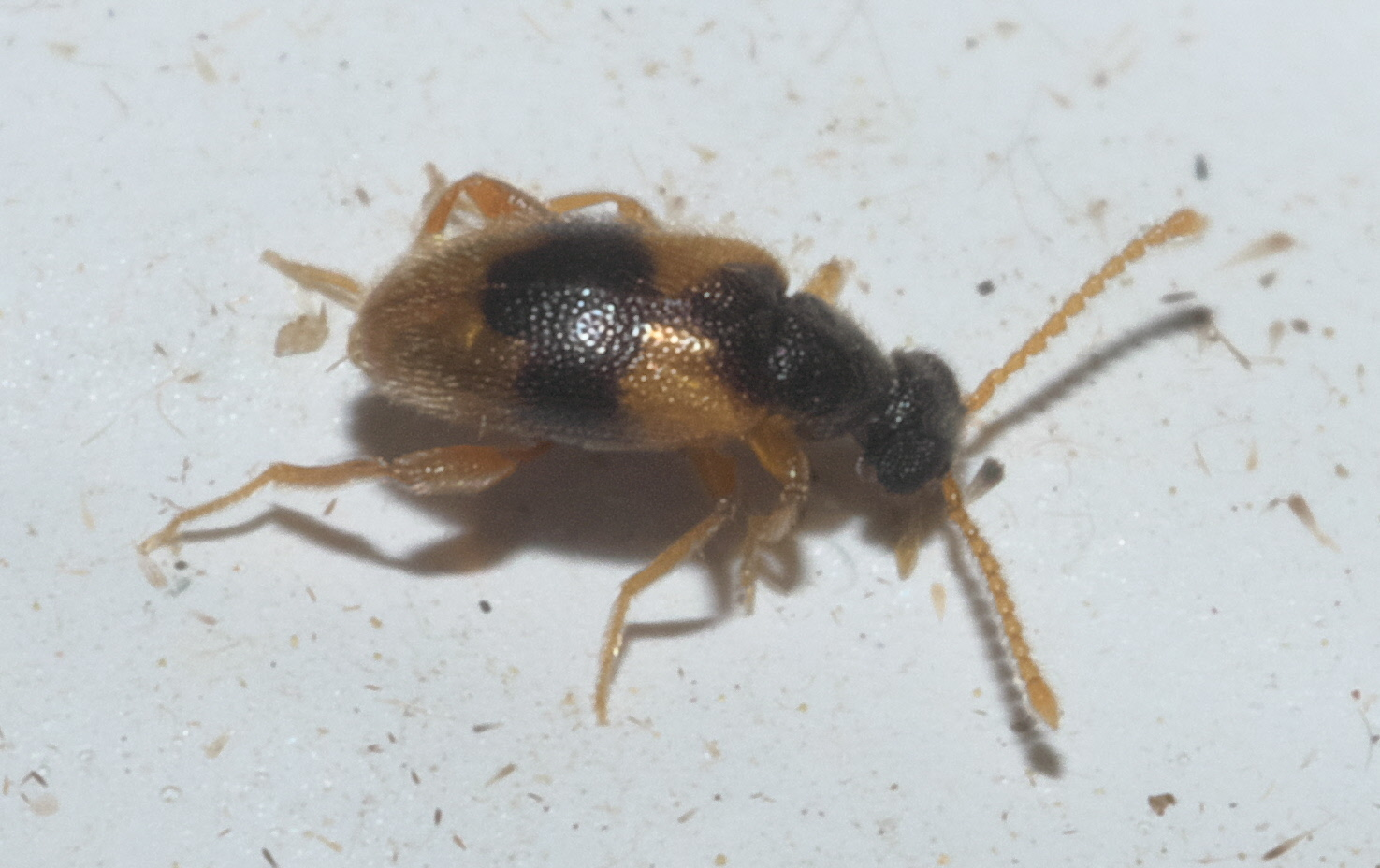
- Syzeton hubbardi, Oklahoma

Scientific classification
- Kingdom: Animalia
- Phylum: Arthropoda
- Class: Insecta
- Order: Coleoptera
- Suborder: Polyphaga
- Infraorder: Cucujiformia
- Family: Aderidae
- Genus: Syzeton
- Species: S. hubbardi

Binomial name
- Syzeton hubbardi (Casey, 1895)

Synonyms
- Zonantes hubbardi Casey, 1895; Zonantes schwarzi Casey, 1895

= Syzeton hubbardi =

Species of beetle

Syzeton hubbardi is a species of ant-like leaf beetle in the family Aderidae. It is found in North America.

This species was formerly a member of the genus Zonantes. The species of that genus were transferred to the genus Syzeton as a result of research published in 2022.
