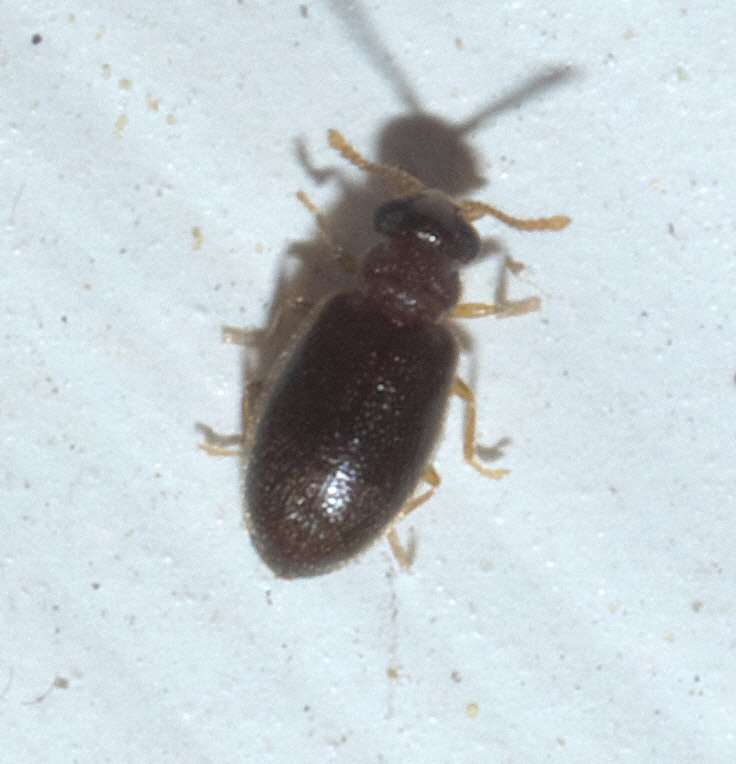
- Cnopus impressus, Oklahoma

Scientific classification
- Kingdom: Animalia
- Phylum: Arthropoda
- Class: Insecta
- Order: Coleoptera
- Suborder: Polyphaga
- Infraorder: Cucujiformia
- Family: Aderidae
- Genus: Cnopus
- Species: C. impressus

Binomial name
- Cnopus impressus (LeConte, 1875)

Synonyms
- Xylophilus impressus LeConte, 1875

= Cnopus impressus =

Species of beetle

Cnopus impressus is a species of ant-like leaf beetle in the family Aderidae. It is found in North America.
