= Aderus brunnipennis =

Scientific classification
- Kingdom: Animalia
- Phylum: Arthropoda
- Class: Insecta
- Order: Coleoptera
- Suborder: Polyphaga
- Infraorder: Cucujiformia
- Family: Aderidae
- Genus: Aderus
- Species: A. brunnipennis

Binomial name
- Aderus brunnipennis (LeConte, 1875)

Synonyms
- Xylophilus brunnipennis LeConte, 1875

Species of beetle

Aderus brunnipennis is a species of ant-like leaf beetle in the family Aderidae. It is found in the Caribbean Sea and North America.
