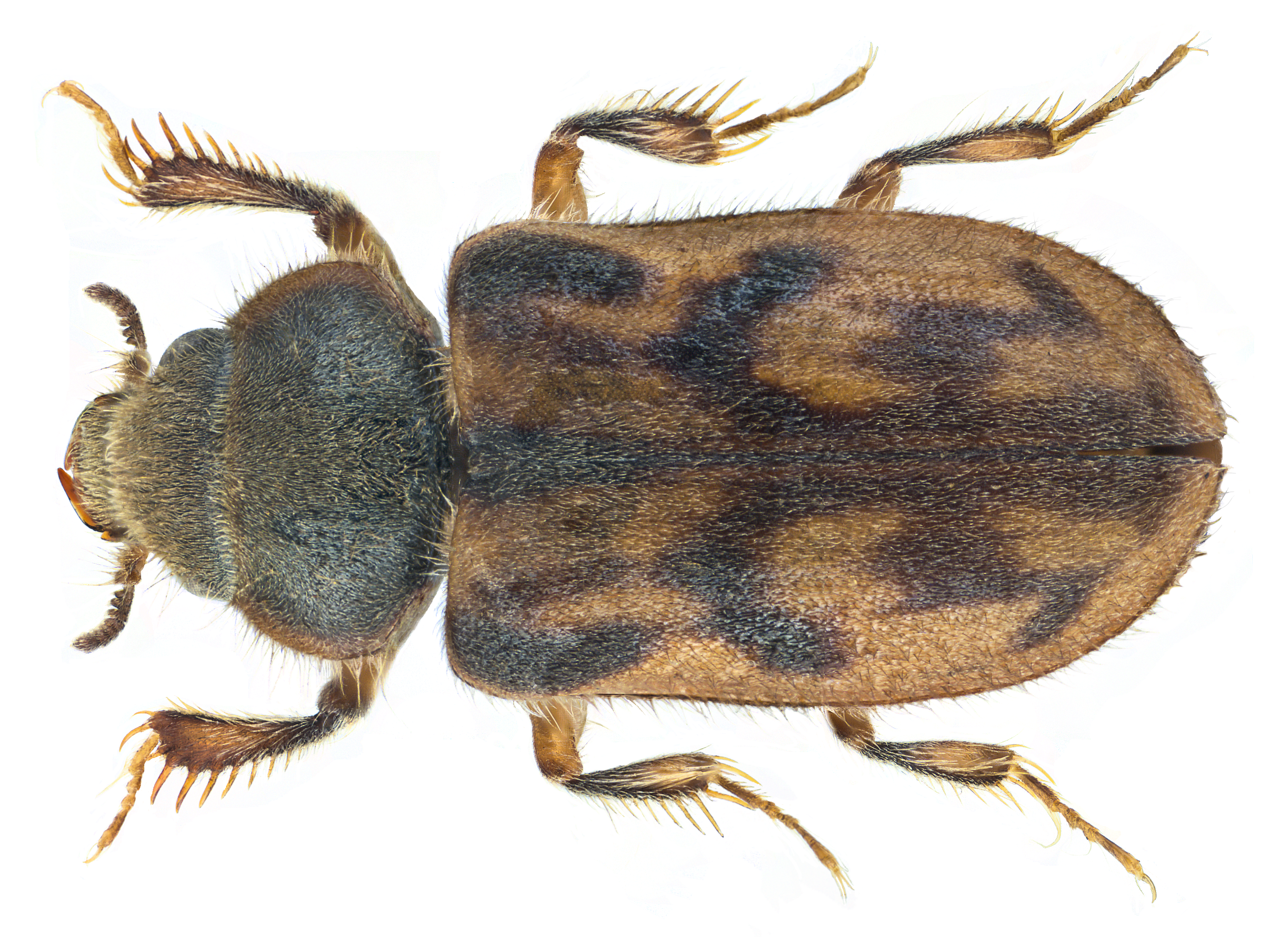

Scientific classification
- Kingdom: Animalia
- Phylum: Arthropoda
- Clade: Pancrustacea
- Class: Insecta
- Order: Coleoptera
- Suborder: Polyphaga
- Infraorder: Elateriformia
- Family: Heteroceridae
- Genus: Heterocerus
- Species: H. fenestratus

Binomial name
- Heterocerus fenestratus (Thunberg, 1784)

= Heterocerus fenestratus =

Species of beetle

Heterocerus fenestratus is a species of variegated mud-loving beetle in the family Heteroceridae.
