= Ariotus luteolus =

Scientific classification
- Kingdom: Animalia
- Phylum: Arthropoda
- Class: Insecta
- Order: Coleoptera
- Suborder: Polyphaga
- Infraorder: Cucujiformia
- Family: Aderidae
- Genus: Ariotus
- Species: A. luteolus

Binomial name
- Ariotus luteolus (Casey, 1895)

Synonyms
- Scanylus luteolus Casey, 1895

Species of beetle

Ariotus luteolus is a species of ant-like leaf beetle in the family Aderidae. It is found in North America.
