= Axylophilus yuccae =

Scientific classification
- Kingdom: Animalia
- Phylum: Arthropoda
- Clade: Pancrustacea
- Class: Insecta
- Order: Coleoptera
- Suborder: Polyphaga
- Infraorder: Cucujiformia
- Family: Aderidae
- Genus: Axylophilus
- Species: A. yuccae

Binomial name
- Axylophilus yuccae Casey, 1895

Species of beetle

Axylophilus yuccae is a beetle in the genus Axylophilus found in Mexico and North America (near Texas), using yucca and palm hosts.

It is characterized by having a blistered abdomen, with many downward facing hairs. It is dull yellow in coloration, with pale brown markings. Its eyes are quite large, and the antenna are inflated at the last two segments.
