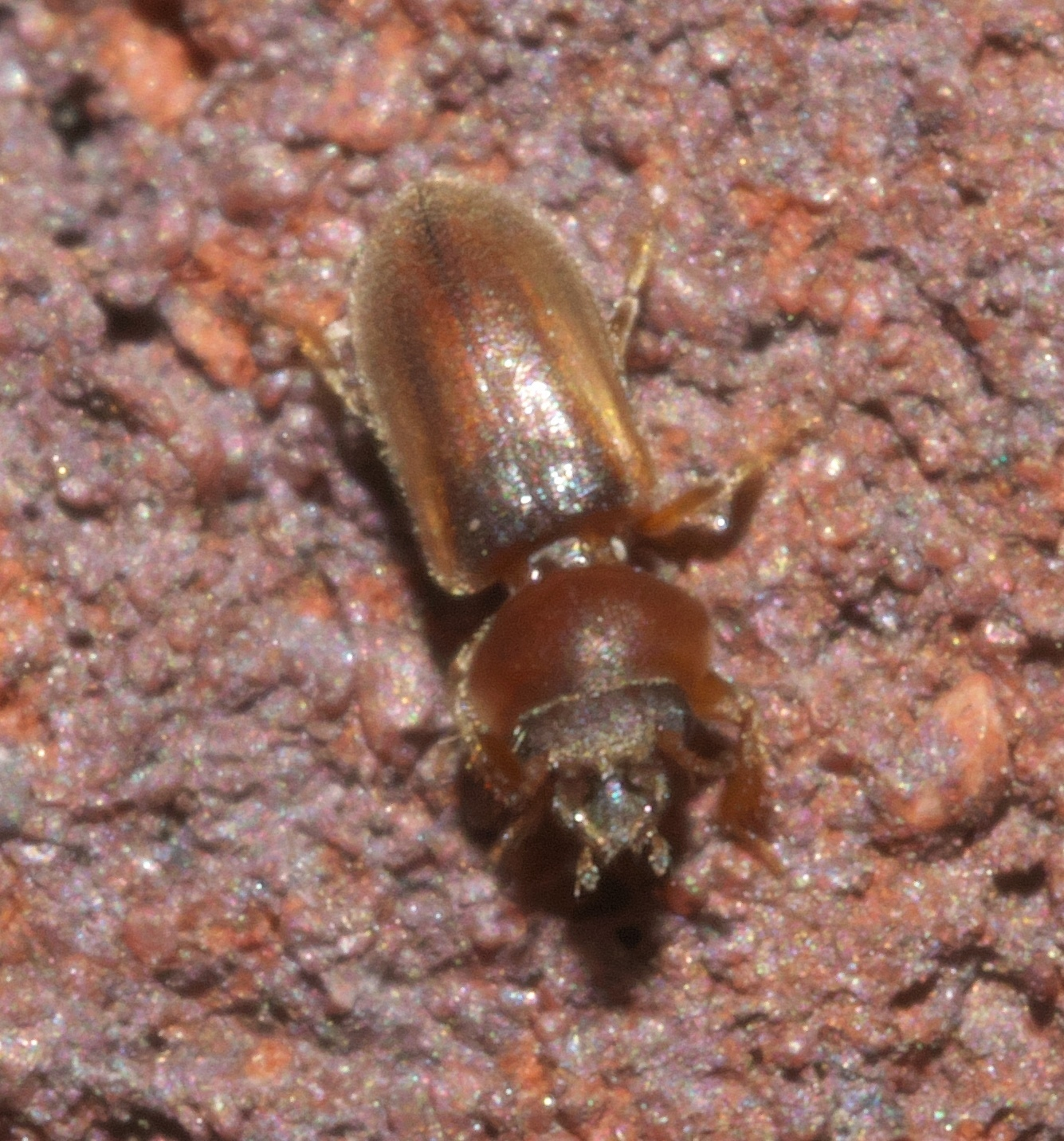
- Tropicus pusillus, Oklahoma

Scientific classification
- Domain: Eukaryota
- Kingdom: Animalia
- Phylum: Arthropoda
- Class: Insecta
- Order: Coleoptera
- Suborder: Polyphaga
- Infraorder: Elateriformia
- Family: Heteroceridae
- Genus: Tropicus
- Species: T. pusillus

Binomial name
- Tropicus pusillus (Say, 1823)

= Tropicus pusillus =

Species of beetle

Tropicus pusillus is a species of variegated mud-loving beetle in the family Heteroceridae. It is found in the Caribbean Sea, Central America, and North America.
