= Heterocerus cinctus =

Scientific classification
- Kingdom: Animalia
- Phylum: Arthropoda
- Class: Insecta
- Order: Coleoptera
- Suborder: Polyphaga
- Infraorder: Elateriformia
- Family: Heteroceridae
- Genus: Heterocerus
- Species: H. cinctus

Binomial name
- Heterocerus cinctus Motschulsky, 1858

Synonyms
- Heterocerus confusus Grouvelle, 1903

Species of beetle

Heterocerus cinctus, is a species of variegated mud-loving beetle found in India, Andaman Islands, Pakistan, and Sri Lanka.
