= Cnopus nucleus =

Scientific classification
- Domain: Eukaryota
- Kingdom: Animalia
- Phylum: Arthropoda
- Class: Insecta
- Order: Coleoptera
- Suborder: Polyphaga
- Infraorder: Cucujiformia
- Family: Aderidae
- Genus: Cnopus
- Species: C. nucleus

Binomial name
- Cnopus nucleus (Fall, 1901)

Synonyms
- Xylophilus nucleus Fall, 1901

Species of beetle

Cnopus nucleus is a species of ant-like leaf beetle in the family Aderidae. It is found in North America.
