= Syzeton ater =

Scientific classification
- Kingdom: Animalia
- Phylum: Arthropoda
- Class: Insecta
- Order: Coleoptera
- Suborder: Polyphaga
- Infraorder: Cucujiformia
- Family: Aderidae
- Genus: Syzeton
- Species: S. ater

Binomial name
- Syzeton ater (LeConte, 1875)

Synonyms
- Zonantes ater (LeConte, 1875); Xylophilus ater LeConte, 1875

Species of beetle

Syzeton ater is a species of ant-like leaf beetle in the family Aderidae. It is found in North America.

This species was formerly a member of the genus Zonantes. The species of that genus were transferred to the genus Syzeton as a result of research published in 2022.
