= Augyles feai =

Scientific classification
- Kingdom: Animalia
- Phylum: Arthropoda
- Class: Insecta
- Order: Coleoptera
- Suborder: Polyphaga
- Infraorder: Elateriformia
- Superfamily: Byrrhoidea
- Family: Heteroceridae
- Genus: Augyles
- Species: A. feai

Binomial name
- Augyles feai (Grouvelle, 1896)

Synonyms
- Heterocerus (Littorimus) variabilis Mamitza, 1933; Augyles feai Mascagni & Sforzi, 1999; Augyles feae Skalicky, 2004; Littorimus feai Mascagni, 1993; Heterocerus (Litorimus) roseni Mamitza, 1935

Species of beetle

Augyles feai, is a species of variegated mud-loving beetle found in India, Myanmar, Nepal, Sri Lanka, Philippines, and Pakistan.
