= Emelinus butleri =

Scientific classification
- Domain: Eukaryota
- Kingdom: Animalia
- Phylum: Arthropoda
- Class: Insecta
- Order: Coleoptera
- Suborder: Polyphaga
- Infraorder: Cucujiformia
- Family: Aderidae
- Genus: Emelinus
- Species: E. butleri

Binomial name
- Emelinus butleri Werner, 1956

Species of beetle

Emelinus butleri is a species of ant-like leaf beetle in the family Aderidae. It is found in North America.
