= Heterocerus collaris =

Scientific classification
- Domain: Eukaryota
- Kingdom: Animalia
- Phylum: Arthropoda
- Class: Insecta
- Order: Coleoptera
- Suborder: Polyphaga
- Infraorder: Elateriformia
- Family: Heteroceridae
- Genus: Heterocerus
- Species: H. collaris

Binomial name
- Heterocerus collaris Kiesenwetter, 1851

Species of beetle

Heterocerus collaris is a species of variegated mud-loving beetle in the family Heteroceridae. It is found in North America.
