= Elonus excavatus =

Scientific classification
- Domain: Eukaryota
- Kingdom: Animalia
- Phylum: Arthropoda
- Class: Insecta
- Order: Coleoptera
- Suborder: Polyphaga
- Infraorder: Cucujiformia
- Family: Aderidae
- Genus: Elonus
- Species: E. excavatus

Binomial name
- Elonus excavatus Werner, 1993

Species of beetle

Elonus excavatus is a species of ant-like leaf beetle in the family Aderidae. It is found in North America.
