= Syzeton signatus =

Scientific classification
- Kingdom: Animalia
- Phylum: Arthropoda
- Class: Insecta
- Order: Coleoptera
- Suborder: Polyphaga
- Infraorder: Cucujiformia
- Family: Aderidae
- Genus: Syzeton
- Species: S. signatus

Binomial name
- Syzeton signatus (Haldeman, 1848)

Synonyms
- Zonantes signatus (Haldeman, 1848); Euglenes signatus Haldeman, 1848

Species of beetle

Syzeton signatus is a species of ant-like leaf beetle in the family Aderidae. It is found in North America.

This species was formerly a member of the genus Zonantes. The species of that genus were transferred to the genus Syzeton as a result of research published in 2022.
