= Ganascus ptinoides =

Scientific classification
- Domain: Eukaryota
- Kingdom: Animalia
- Phylum: Arthropoda
- Class: Insecta
- Order: Coleoptera
- Suborder: Polyphaga
- Infraorder: Cucujiformia
- Family: Aderidae
- Genus: Ganascus
- Species: G. ptinoides

Binomial name
- Ganascus ptinoides (Schwarz, 1878)

Synonyms
- Xylophilus ptinoides Schwarz, 1878

Species of beetle

Ganascus ptinoides is a species of ant-like leaf beetle in the family Aderidae. It is found in North America.
