= Heterocerus mexicanus =

Scientific classification
- Kingdom: Animalia
- Phylum: Arthropoda
- Class: Insecta
- Order: Coleoptera
- Suborder: Polyphaga
- Infraorder: Elateriformia
- Family: Heteroceridae
- Genus: Heterocerus
- Species: H. mexicanus

Binomial name
- Heterocerus mexicanus Sharp, 1882

Species of beetle

Heterocerus mexicanus is a species of variegated mud-loving beetle in the family Heteroceridae. It is found in Central America and North America.
