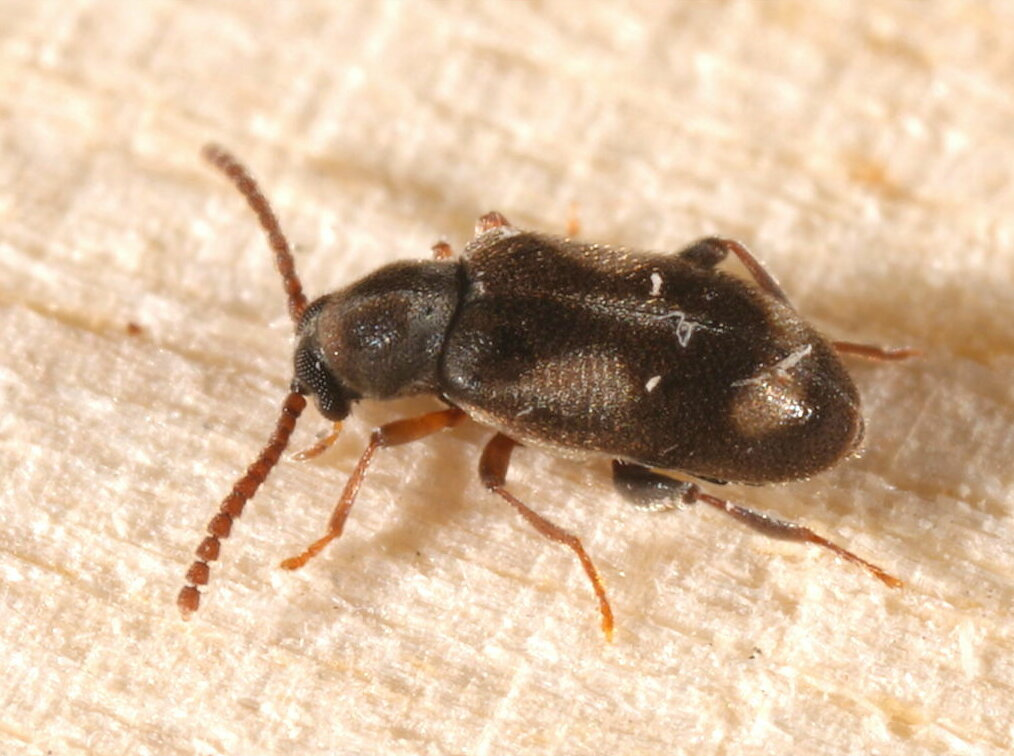
- Phytobaenus amabilis

Scientific classification
- Kingdom: Animalia
- Phylum: Arthropoda
- Class: Insecta
- Order: Coleoptera
- Suborder: Polyphaga
- Infraorder: Cucujiformia
- Family: Aderidae
- Genus: Phytobaenus; Sahlberg, 1834

= Phytobaenus =

Genus of beetles

Phytobaenus is a genus of beetles belonging to the family Aderidae.

The species of this genus are found in Europe.

Species:

- Phytobaenus amabilis Sahlberg, 1834
