= Anidorus =

Scientific classification
- Domain: Eukaryota
- Kingdom: Animalia
- Phylum: Arthropoda
- Class: Insecta
- Order: Coleoptera
- Suborder: Polyphaga
- Infraorder: Cucujiformia
- Family: Aderidae
- Genus: Anidorus; Mulsant & Rey, 1866

Synonyms
- Anicorus Mulsant & Rey, 1866

Genus of beetles

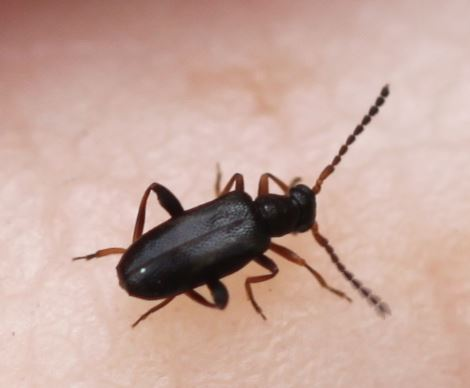
Anidorus nigrinus

Anidorus is a genus of beetles belonging to the family Aderidae.

The genus was first described by Mulsant and Rey in 1866.

The species of this genus are found in Europe.

Species:

- Anidorus lateralis (Gredler, 1866)
- Anidorus nigrinus (Germar, 1842)
- Anidorus sanguinolentus (Kiesenwetter, 1861)
