= Ganascus =

Scientific classification
- Kingdom: Animalia
- Phylum: Arthropoda
- Class: Insecta
- Order: Coleoptera
- Suborder: Polyphaga
- Infraorder: Cucujiformia
- Family: Aderidae
- Genus: Ganascus; Casey, 1895

Synonyms
- Sandytes Casey, 1895

Genus of beetles

Ganascus is a genus of ant-like leaf beetles in the family Aderidae. There are at least two described species in Ganascus.

== Species ==
These two species belong to the genus Ganascus:

- Ganascus ptinoides (Schwarz, 1878)
- Ganascus ventricosus (LeConte, 1875)
