= Pseudanidorus =

Scientific classification
- Kingdom: Animalia
- Phylum: Arthropoda
- Class: Insecta
- Order: Coleoptera
- Suborder: Polyphaga
- Infraorder: Cucujiformia
- Family: Aderidae
- Genus: Pseudanidorus; Pic, 1893

Synonyms
- Pseudeuglenes Pic, 1897

Genus of beetles

Pseudanidorus is a genus of beetles belonging to the family Aderidae.

The species of this genus are found in Europe.

Species:

- Pseudanidorus cyprius (Baudi, 1877)
- Pseudanidorus laesicollis (Fairmaire, 1883)
