= Ariotus =

Scientific classification
- Kingdom: Animalia
- Phylum: Arthropoda
- Class: Insecta
- Order: Coleoptera
- Suborder: Polyphaga
- Infraorder: Cucujiformia
- Family: Aderidae
- Genus: Ariotus; Casey, 1895

Synonyms
- Scanylus Casey, 1895

Genus of beetles

Ariotus is a genus of ant-like leaf beetles in the family Aderidae. There are at least four described species in Ariotus.

== Species ==
These four species belong to the genus Ariotus:

- Ariotus luteolus (Casey, 1895)
- Ariotus pruinosus (Casey, 1895)
- Ariotus quercicola (Schwarz, 1878)
- Ariotus subtropicus Casey, 1895
