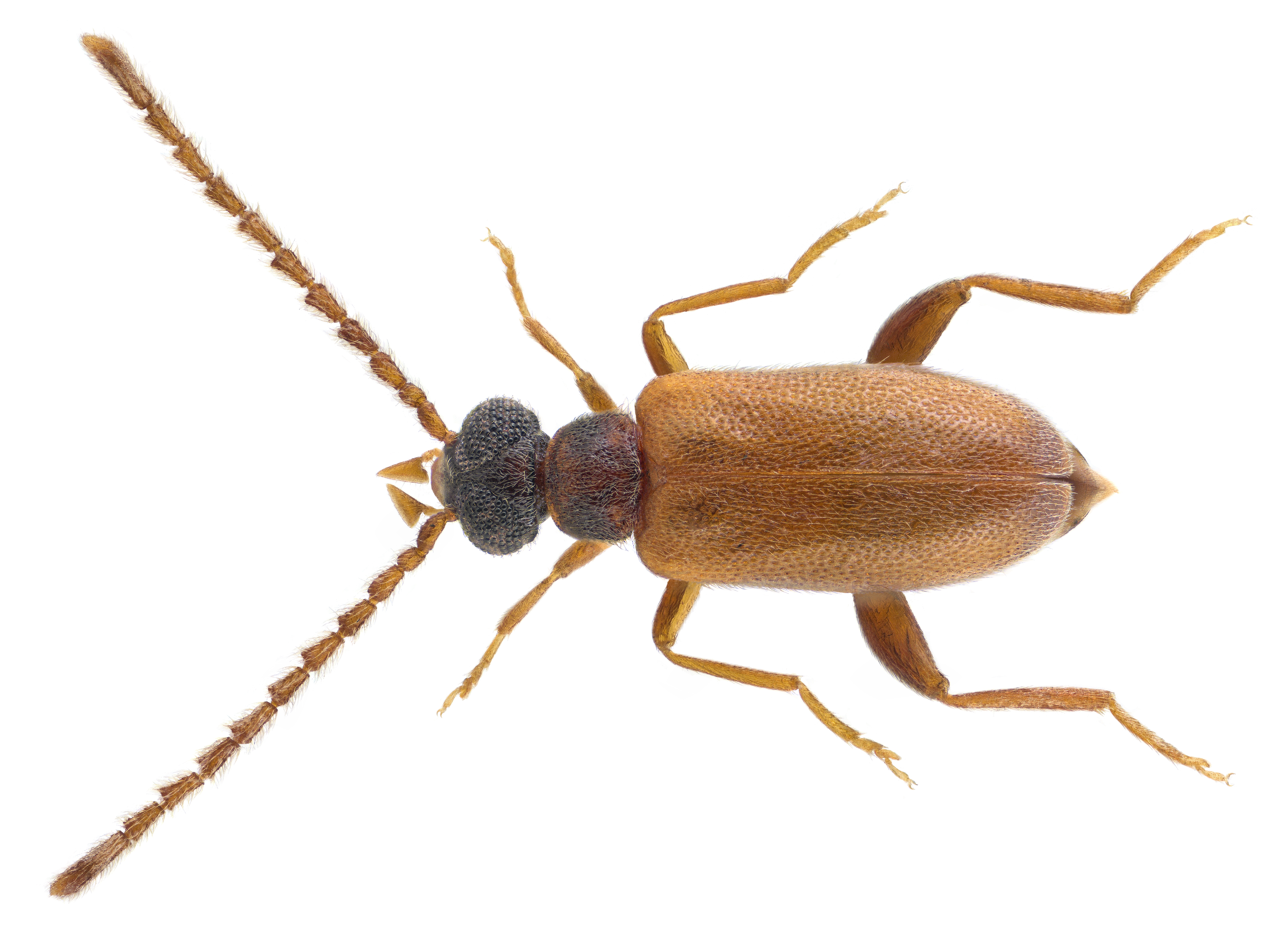

Scientific classification
- Kingdom: Animalia
- Phylum: Arthropoda
- Class: Insecta
- Order: Coleoptera
- Suborder: Polyphaga
- Infraorder: Cucujiformia
- Family: Aderidae
- Genus: Euglenes; Westwood, 1830

= Euglenes =

Genus of beetles

Euglenes is a genus of ant-like leaf beetles in the family Aderidae. There are about five described species in Euglenes.

== Species ==
These six species belong to the genus Euglenes:

- Euglenes nitidifrons Thomson, 1886^{g}
- Euglenes oculatissimus (Wollaston, 1864)^{g}
- Euglenes oculatus (Paykull, 1798)
- Euglenes pygmaeus De Geer, 1775^{g b}
- Euglenes serricornis Reitter, 1885^{g}
- Euglenes wollastoni Israelson, 1971^{g}

Data sources: i = ITIS, c = Catalogue of Life, g = GBIF, b = Bugguide.net
