= Zarcosia =

Scientific classification
- Domain: Eukaryota
- Kingdom: Animalia
- Phylum: Arthropoda
- Class: Insecta
- Order: Coleoptera
- Suborder: Polyphaga
- Infraorder: Cucujiformia
- Family: Aderidae
- Genus: Zarcosia; Collado & Alonso-Zarazaga, 1996

Genus of insects

Zarcosia is a genus of beetles belonging to the family Aderidae.

The species of this genus are found in Southeastern Asia.

Species:

- Zarcosia armipes Fairmaire, 1896
- Zarcosia barclayi Gompel, 2020
- Zarcosia barlayi Gompel, 2020
- Zarcosia batuensis Werner, 1962
- Zarcosia bedosae Gompel, 2020
- Zarcosia bipartita Pic, 1901
- Zarcosia brunnea Gompel, 2020
- Zarcosia capitalis Pic, 1901
- Zarcosia cephalica Werner, 1962
- Zarcosia deharvengi Gompel, 2020
- Zarcosia dentatifemur Pic, 1912
- Zarcosia discoidalis Pic, 1902
- Zarcosia genjiensis Pic, 1917
- Zarcosia gerstmeieri Gompel, 2020
- Zarcosia glaucescens Champion, 1920
- Zarcosia grandiceps Pic, 1899
- Zarcosia holosericea Champion, 1916
- Zarcosia ilonae Gompel, 2020
- Zarcosia intermedia Gompel, 2020
- Zarcosia javana Pic, 1894
- Zarcosia kempi Blair, 1924
- Zarcosia lemairei Gompel, 2020
- Zarcosia longithorax Pic, 1899
- Zarcosia lucifuga Heberdey, 1931
- Zarcosia luteitarsis Champion, 1924
- Zarcosia malayana Werner, 1962
- Zarcosia nathani Pic, 1943
- Zarcosia nigrofasciata Pic, 1899
- Zarcosia obscuricornis Pic, 1927
- Zarcosia palliditarsis Pic, 1912
- Zarcosia patucki Champion, 1924
- Zarcosia picina Fairmaire, 1893
- Zarcosia plumbea Champion, 1916
- Zarcosia rubrobasalis Pic, 1921
- Zarcosia rufotestacea Pic, 1901
- Zarcosia schawalleri Gompel, 2020
- Zarcosia sellata Champion, 1916
- Zarcosia sexdentata Champion, 1924
- Zarcosia sinuata Gompel, 2020
- Zarcosia spinifemur Gompel, 2020
- Zarcosia srilankaensis Gompel, 2020
- Zarcosia subglaber Pic, 1952
- Zarcosia subrobusta Pic, 1943
- Zarcosia subrufa Champion, 1924
- Zarcosia sumatrensis Gompel, 2020
- Zarcosia testaceitarsis Pic, 1926
- Zarcosia troglodytes Champion, 1916
- Zarcosia uncifer Champion, 1916
- Zarcosia weigeli Gompel, 2020
