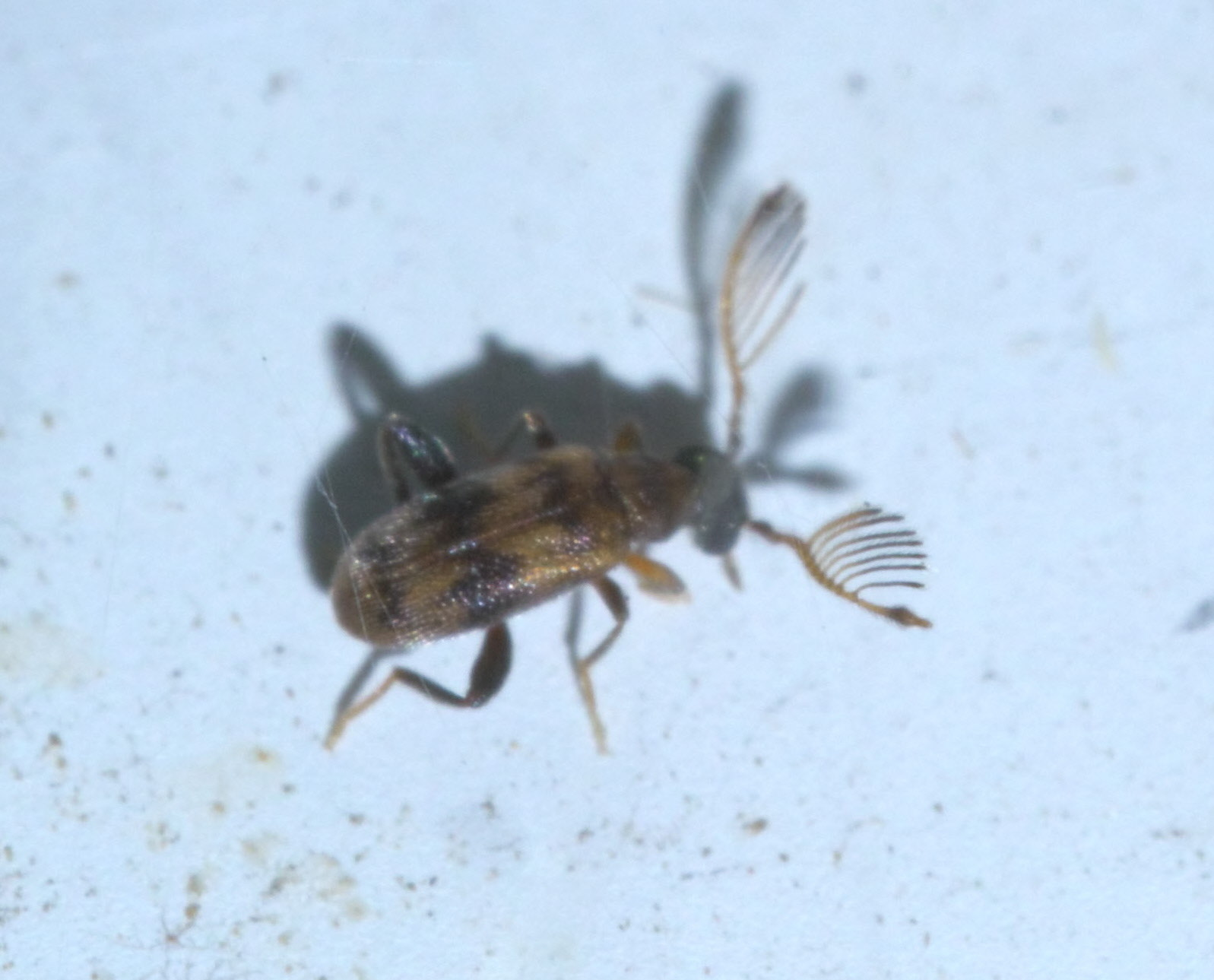
- Emelinus melsheimeri

Scientific classification
- Kingdom: Animalia
- Phylum: Arthropoda
- Class: Insecta
- Order: Coleoptera
- Suborder: Polyphaga
- Infraorder: Cucujiformia
- Family: Aderidae
- Genus: Emelinus; Casey, 1895

= Emelinus =

Genus of beetles

Emelinus is a genus of ant-like leaf beetles in the family Aderidae. There are at least three described species in Emelinus.

== Species ==
These three species belong to the genus Emelinus:

- Emelinus butleri Werner, 1956
- Emelinus huachucanus Werner, 1956
- Emelinus melsheimeri (LeConte, 1855)
