= Gymnoganascus =

Scientific classification
- Kingdom: Animalia
- Phylum: Arthropoda
- Class: Insecta
- Order: Coleoptera
- Suborder: Polyphaga
- Infraorder: Cucujiformia
- Family: Aderidae
- Genus: Gymnoganascus; Werner, 1990

Genus of beetles

Gymnoganascus is a genus of ant-like leaf beetles in the family Aderidae. There is one described species in Gymnoganascus, G. stephani. The distribution range of Gymnoganascus stephani includes the Caribbean, Central America, and North America.
