= Aderus feai =

Scientific classification
- Domain: Eukaryota
- Kingdom: Animalia
- Phylum: Arthropoda
- Class: Insecta
- Order: Coleoptera
- Suborder: Polyphaga
- Infraorder: Cucujiformia
- Family: Aderidae
- Genus: Aderus
- Species: A. feai

Binomial name
- Aderus feai (Pic, 1906)

Synonyms
- Hylophilus feai Pic, 1906

Species of beetle

Aderus feai is a species of beetles from the family Aderidae, the ant-like leaf beetles. It occurs in Cape Verde. The species was described in 1906 by Maurice Pic, who named it after zoologist Leonardo Fea.
