= Pseudariotus =

Scientific classification
- Kingdom: Animalia
- Phylum: Arthropoda
- Clade: Pancrustacea
- Class: Insecta
- Order: Coleoptera
- Suborder: Polyphaga
- Infraorder: Cucujiformia
- Family: Aderidae
- Genus: Pseudariotus; Casey, 1895
- Species: P. notatus

Binomial name
- Pseudariotus notatus (LeConte, 1855)

Genus of beetles

Pseudariotus is a genus of ant-like leaf beetles in the family Aderidae. It is monotypic, being represented by the single species Pseudariotus notatus.
