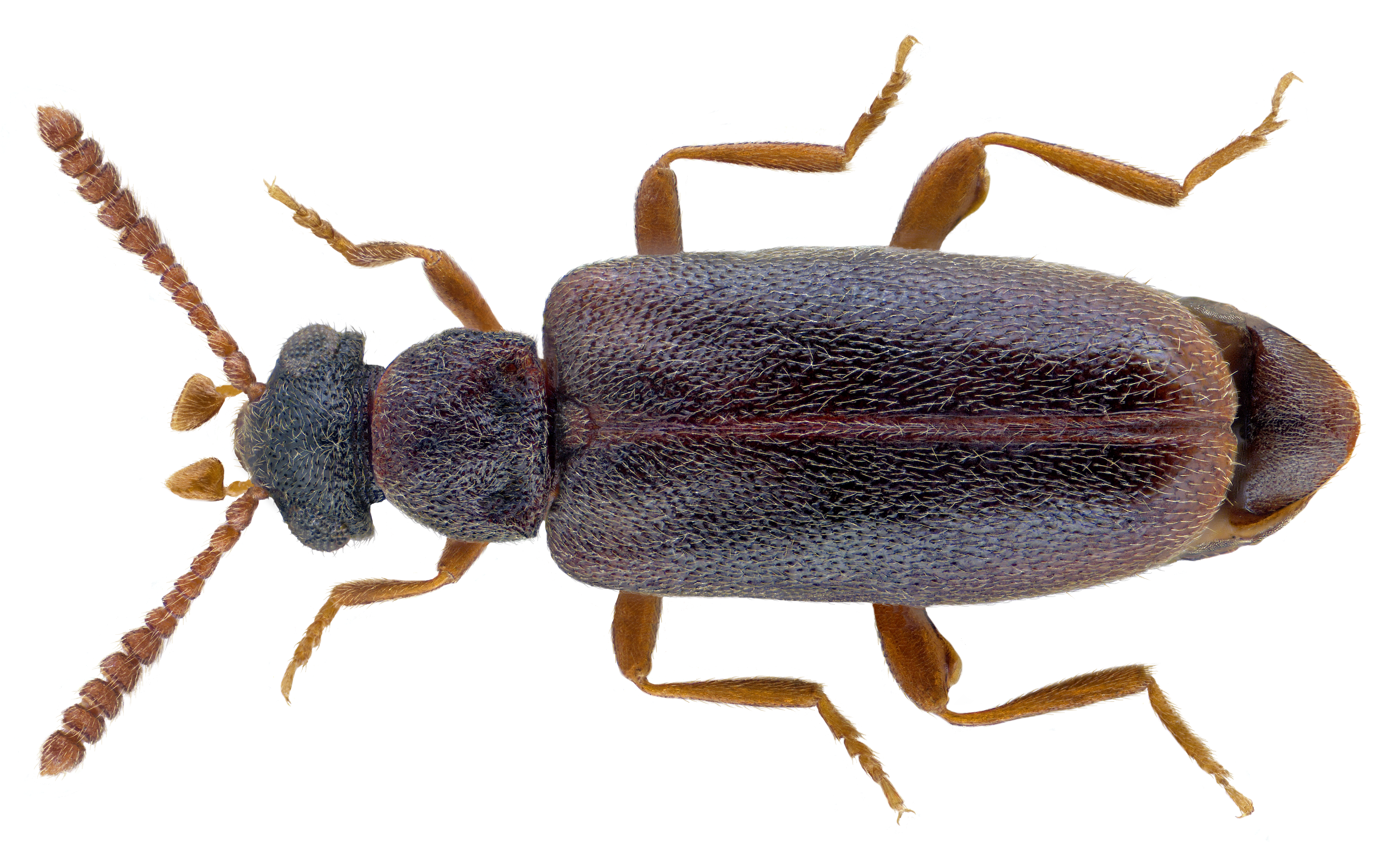

Scientific classification
- Kingdom: Animalia
- Phylum: Arthropoda
- Class: Insecta
- Order: Coleoptera
- Suborder: Polyphaga
- Infraorder: Cucujiformia
- Superfamily: Tenebrionoidea
- Family: Aderidae
- Genus: Vanonus; Casey, 1895

Synonyms
- Tanilotes Casey, 1895

= Vanonus =

Genus of beetles

Vanonus is a genus of ant-like leaf beetles in the family Aderidae. There are about 16 described species in Vanonus.

== Species ==
These 16 species belong to the genus Vanonus:

- Vanonus aestiorum Alekseev & Grzymala, 2015
- Vanonus balteatus Werner, 1990
- Vanonus brevicornis (Perris, 1869)
- Vanonus brunnescens (Fall, 1901)
- Vanonus calvescens Casey, 1895
- Vanonus huronicus Casey, 1895
- Vanonus macrops Werner, 1990
- Vanonus musculus Werner, 1990
- Vanonus oklahomensis Werner, 1990
- Vanonus piceus (LeConte, 1855)
- Vanonus sagax Casey, 1895
- Vanonus ulmerigicus Alekseev & Grzymala, 2015
- Vanonus uniformis Werner, 1990
- Vanonus valgus Werner, 1990
- Vanonus vigilans Casey, 1895
- Vanonus wickhami Casey, 1895
