= Gompelia =

Scientific classification
- Kingdom: Animalia
- Phylum: Arthropoda
- Class: Insecta
- Order: Coleoptera
- Suborder: Polyphaga
- Infraorder: Cucujiformia
- Family: Aderidae
- Genus: Gompelia; Alonso-Zarazaga, 2010

Synonyms
- Otolelus Klinger, 2000

Genus of beetles

Gompelia is a genus of beetles belonging to the family Aderidae.

The species of this genus are found in Europe.

Species:

- Gompelia flaveola (Mulsant & Rey, 1866)
- Gompelia neglecta (Jacquelin du Val, 1863)
