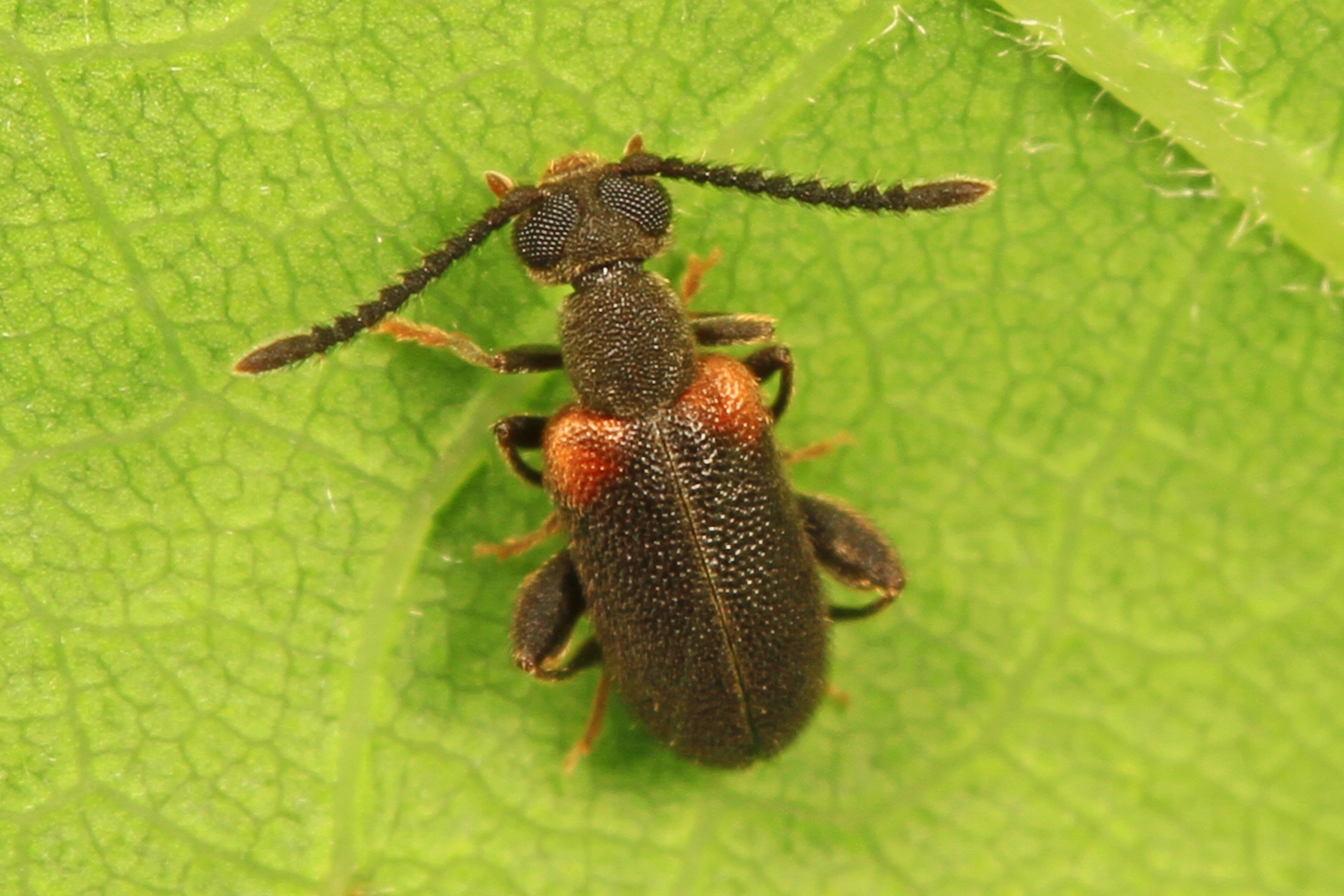
- Elonus basalis

Scientific classification
- Kingdom: Animalia
- Phylum: Arthropoda
- Class: Insecta
- Order: Coleoptera
- Suborder: Polyphaga
- Infraorder: Cucujiformia
- Superfamily: Tenebrionoidea
- Family: Aderidae
- Genus: Elonus; Casey, 1895

= Elonus =

Genus of beetles

Elonus is a genus of ant-like leaf beetles in the family Aderidae. There are about seven described species in Elonus in North America.

== Species ==
These seven species belong to the genus Elonus:

- Elonus basalis (LeConte, 1855)
- Elonus chisosensis Werner, 1993
- Elonus excavatus Werner, 1993
- Elonus gruberi Gompel, 2017
- Elonus hesperus Werner, 1990
- Elonus nebulosus (LeConte, 1875)
- Elonus simplex Werner, 1993
