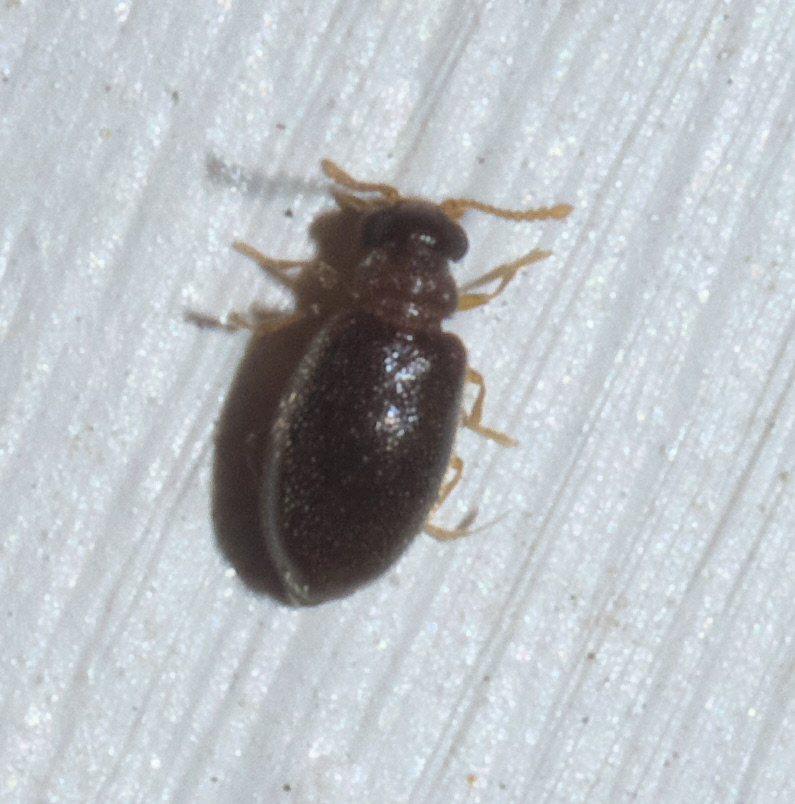
- Cnopus impressus

Scientific classification
- Kingdom: Animalia
- Phylum: Arthropoda
- Clade: Pancrustacea
- Class: Insecta
- Order: Coleoptera
- Suborder: Polyphaga
- Infraorder: Cucujiformia
- Family: Aderidae
- Genus: Cnopus; Champion, 1893

= Cnopus =

Genus of beetles

Cnopus is a genus of ant-like leaf beetles in the family Aderidae. There are at least four described species in Cnopus.

== Species ==
These four species belong to the genus Cnopus:

- Cnopus impressus (LeConte, 1875)
- Cnopus kraxtepellenensis (Alekseev & Grzymala, 2015)
- Cnopus minor (Baudi di Selve, 1877)
- Cnopus nucleus (Fall, 1901)
- Cnopus twentyonepilotorum (Ferreira & Nel, 2026)
