= Tropicus =

Scientific classification
- Domain: Eukaryota
- Kingdom: Animalia
- Phylum: Arthropoda
- Class: Insecta
- Order: Coleoptera
- Suborder: Polyphaga
- Infraorder: Elateriformia
- Family: Heteroceridae
- Genus: Tropicus; Pacheco, 1964

Genus of beetles

Tropicus is a genus of variegated mud-loving beetles in the family Heteroceridae. There are more than 30 described species in Tropicus.

== Species ==
These 33 species belong to the genus Tropicus:

- Tropicus alcicornis Mascagni, 1989
- Tropicus aratus Miller, 1992
- Tropicus arawak Bameul, 1995
- Tropicus bartolozzi Mascagni, 1994
- Tropicus bilineatus (Chevrolat, 1864)
- Tropicus braza Miller, 1992
- Tropicus carus Pacheco, 1964
- Tropicus cithara Pacheco
- Tropicus davidsoni Mascagni, 1993
- Tropicus debilis (Sharp, 1882)
- Tropicus excellens Miller, 1992
- Tropicus hevelorum Skalický, 2007
- Tropicus imperator Pacheco, 1964
- Tropicus infidus Miller, 1992
- Tropicus insidiosus (Grouvelle, 1896)
- Tropicus ladonnae Ivie & Stribling, 1984
- Tropicus lituratus (Kiesenwetter, 1843)
- Tropicus milleri Mascagni, 1993
- Tropicus minutus (Fall, 1920)
- Tropicus nigrellus King and Lago, 2012
- Tropicus niger Skalický, 2007
- Tropicus plaumanni Pacheco, 1964
- Tropicus pusillus (Say, 1823)
- Tropicus riosensis Skalický, 2007
- Tropicus sagittarius Pacheco, 1964
- Tropicus sparus Miller, 1992
- Tropicus speciosa Miller, 1992
- Tropicus squamosus Pacheco, 1964
- Tropicus trifidus Skalický, 2007
- Tropicus trinidadensis Pacheco, 1964
- Tropicus tuberculatus Pacheco, 1964
- Tropicus tucumanensis Pacheco, 1964
- Tropicus vicinus Miller, 1992
