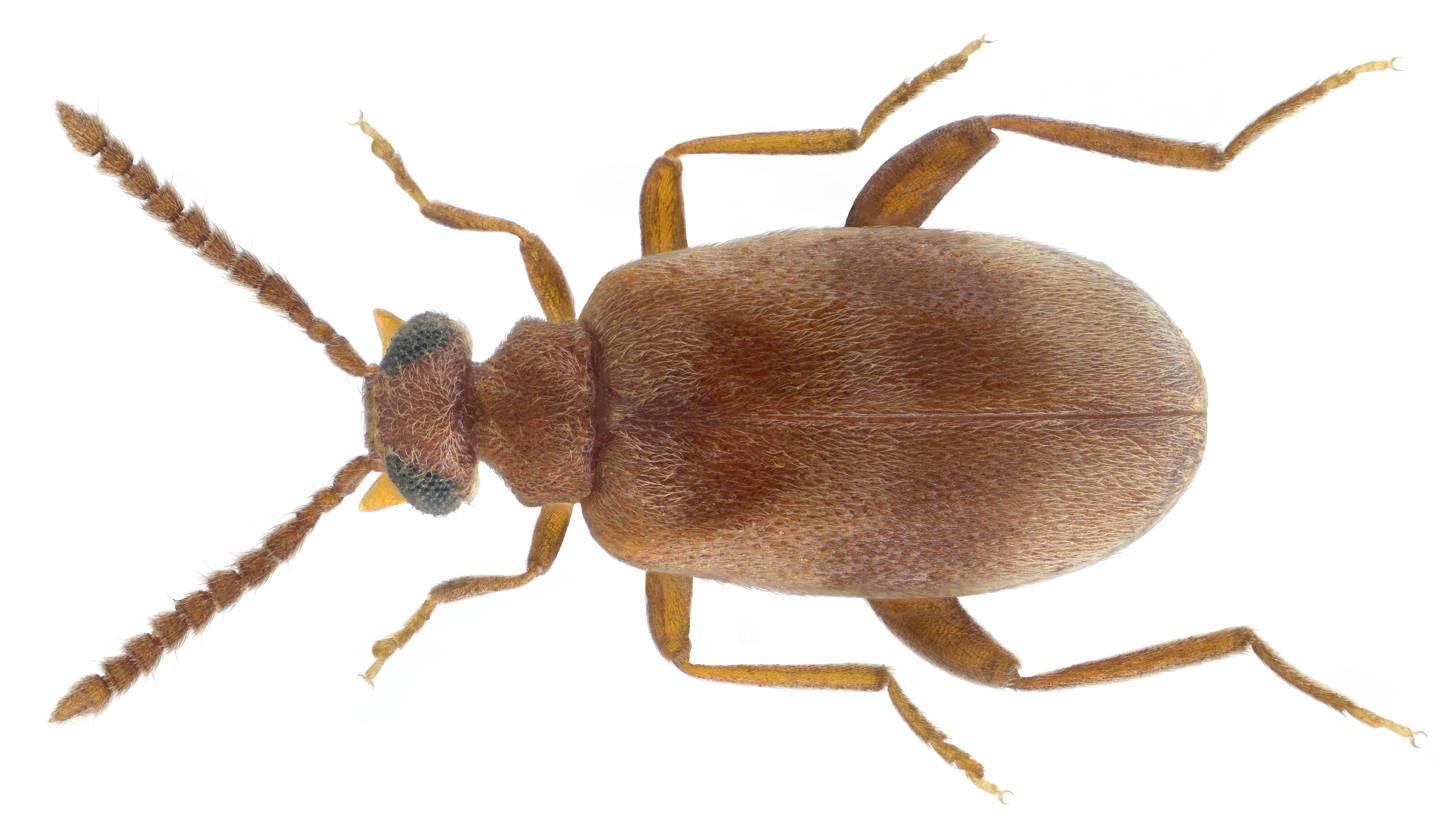

Scientific classification
- Kingdom: Animalia
- Phylum: Arthropoda
- Clade: Pancrustacea
- Class: Insecta
- Order: Coleoptera
- Suborder: Polyphaga
- Infraorder: Cucujiformia
- Family: Aderidae
- Genus: Aderus
- Species: A. populneus

Binomial name
- Aderus populneus (Panzer, 1796)

Synonyms
- Notoxus populneus Panzer, 1796

= Aderus populneus =

Species of beetle

Aderus populneus is a species of ant-like leaf beetle in the family Aderidae. Native to the west Palaearctic (very common in England, it has been introduced in North America. Large eyes, pubescent antennae, 1.5-2mm
