= Abacetus feai =

Scientific classification
- Kingdom: Animalia
- Phylum: Arthropoda
- Class: Insecta
- Order: Coleoptera
- Suborder: Adephaga
- Family: Carabidae
- Genus: Abacetus
- Species: A. feai

Binomial name
- Abacetus feai Straneo, 1940

Species of beetle

Abacetus feai is a species of ground beetle in the subfamily Pterostichinae. It was described by Straneo in 1940.
