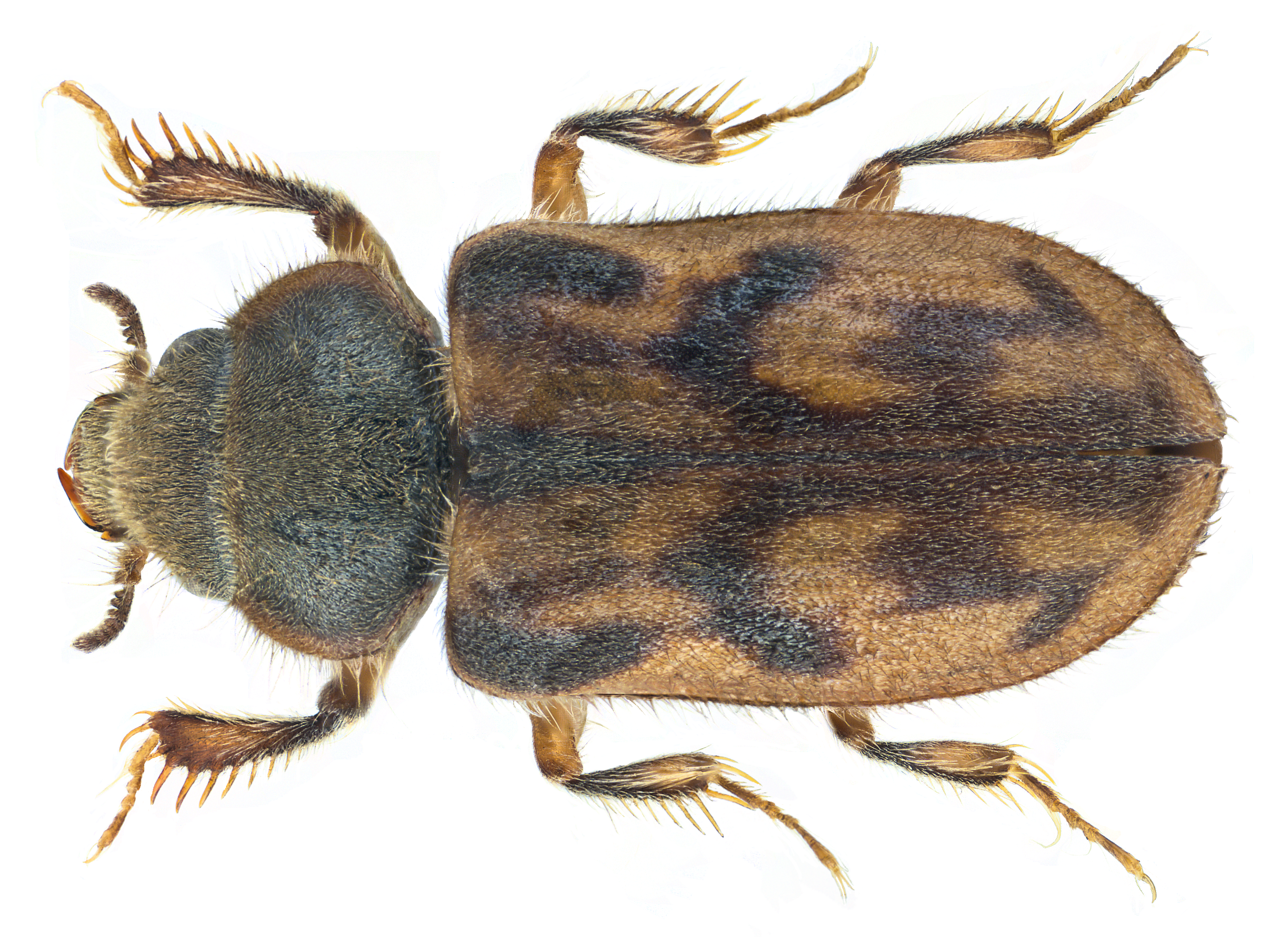
- Heterocerus fenestratus

Scientific classification
- Domain: Eukaryota
- Kingdom: Animalia
- Phylum: Arthropoda
- Class: Insecta
- Order: Coleoptera
- Suborder: Polyphaga
- Infraorder: Elateriformia
- Family: Heteroceridae
- Tribe: Heterocerini
- Genus: Heterocerus; Fabricius, 1792

Synonyms
- Dampfius Pacheco, 1964

= Heterocerus =

Genus of beetles

Heterocerus is a genus of beetles in the family Heteroceridae. There are at least 20 described species in Heterocerus.

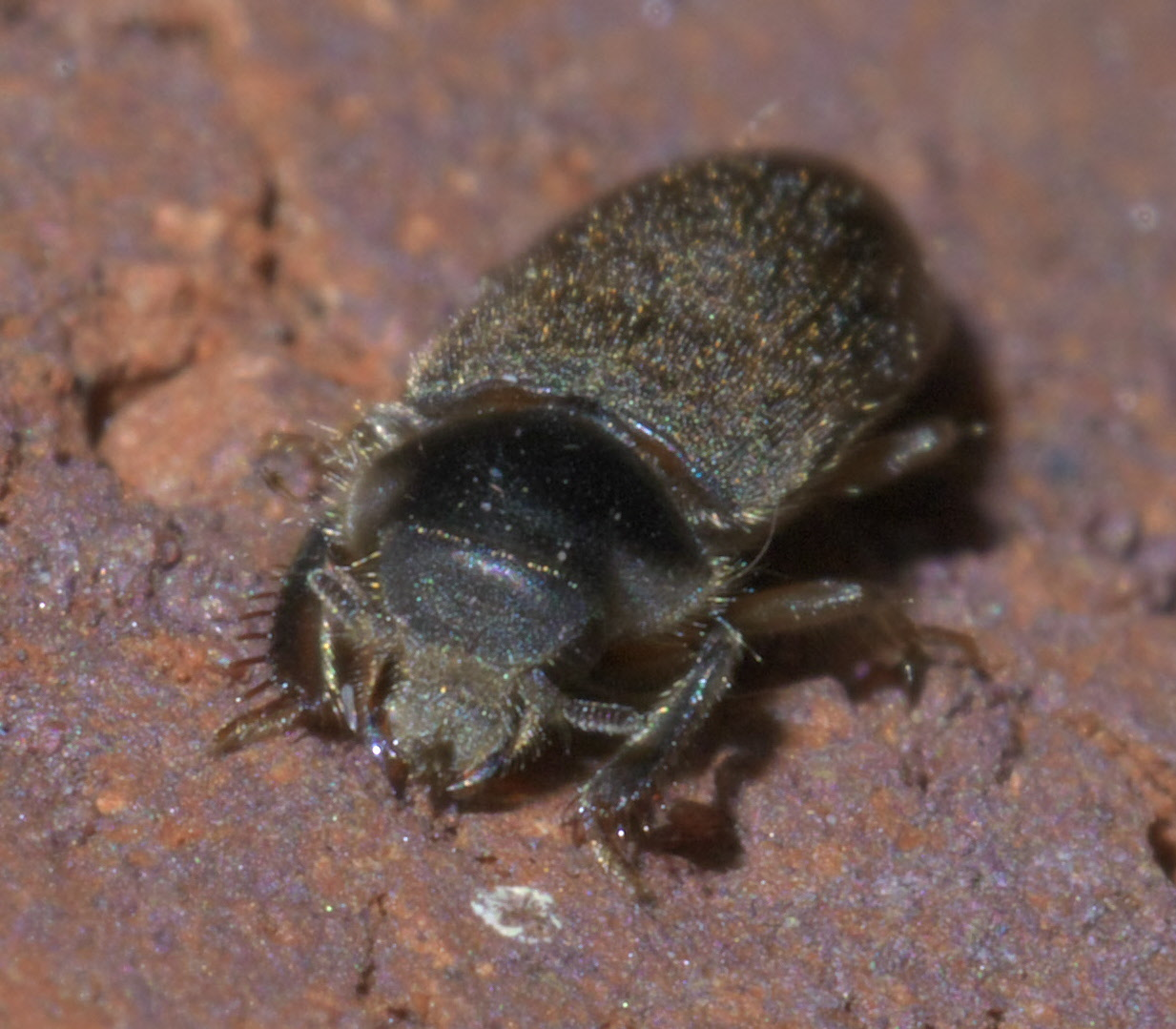
Heterocerus mollinus

== Species ==
- Heterocerus angustatus Chevrolat, 1864
- Heterocerus aptus Miller, 1994
- Heterocerus brunneus Melsheimer, 1844
- Heterocerus cinctus Motschulsky, 1858
- Heterocerus coheni Skalický, 2007
- Heterocerus collaris Kiesenwetter, 1851
- Heterocerus crossi Miller, 1995
- Heterocerus fenestratus (Thunberg, 1784)
- Heterocerus inciertus (Pacheco, 1964)
- Heterocerus infrequens Miller, 1994
- Heterocerus insolens Miller, 1994
- Heterocerus intermuralis Pacheco, 1963
- Heterocerus mexicanus Sharp, 1882
- Heterocerus mirus Miller, 1994
- Heterocerus mollinus Kiesenwetter, 1851
- Heterocerus pallidus Say, 1823
- Heterocerus parrotus (Pacheco, 1964)
- Heterocerus subtilis Miller, 1988
- Heterocerus tenuis Miller, 1988
- Heterocerus texanus (Pacheco, 1964)
- Heterocerus undatus Melsheimer, 1844
- Heterocerus unicus Miller, 1988
- Heterocerus unituberculosus Miller, 1995
- Heterocerus virginiensis Skalický, 2007
