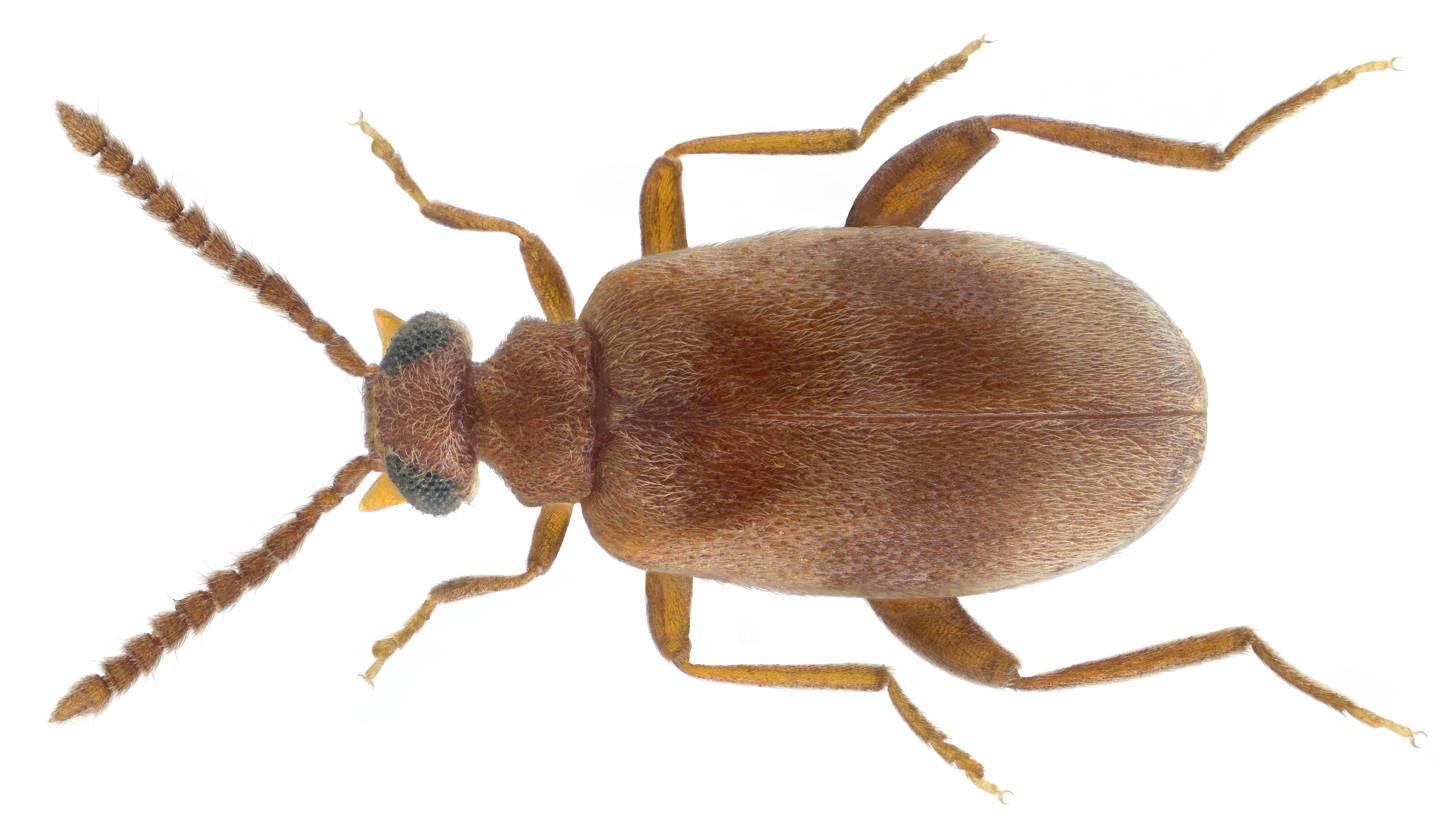
- Aderus populneus

Scientific classification
- Kingdom: Animalia
- Phylum: Arthropoda
- Clade: Pancrustacea
- Class: Insecta
- Order: Coleoptera
- Suborder: Polyphaga
- Infraorder: Cucujiformia
- Family: Aderidae
- Genus: Aderus; Westwood, 1829

Type species
- Lytta boleti Marsham, 1802

Synonyms
- Hylophilus Berthold, 1827 not Temminck, 1822; Xylophilus Latreille, 1829 not Mannerheim, 1823; Phomalus Casey, 1895

= Aderus =

Genus of beetles

Aderus is a genus of leaf beetles of the family Aderidae that resemble ants. The genus was named by John Obadiah Westwood in 1829.

== Selected species ==
- Aderus brunnipennis (LeConte, 1875)^{i c g b}
- Aderus feai (Pic, 1906)
- Aderus lemoulti (Pic, 1909)^{g}
- Aderus multinotatus (Pic, 1920)^{g}
- Aderus populneus (Panzer, 1796)^{i c g b}
- Aderus saginatus (Casey, 1895)^{i c g}
- Aderus tantillus (Champion, 1890)^{i c g b}

Data sources: i = ITIS, c = Catalogue of Life, g = GBIF, b = Bugguide.net
