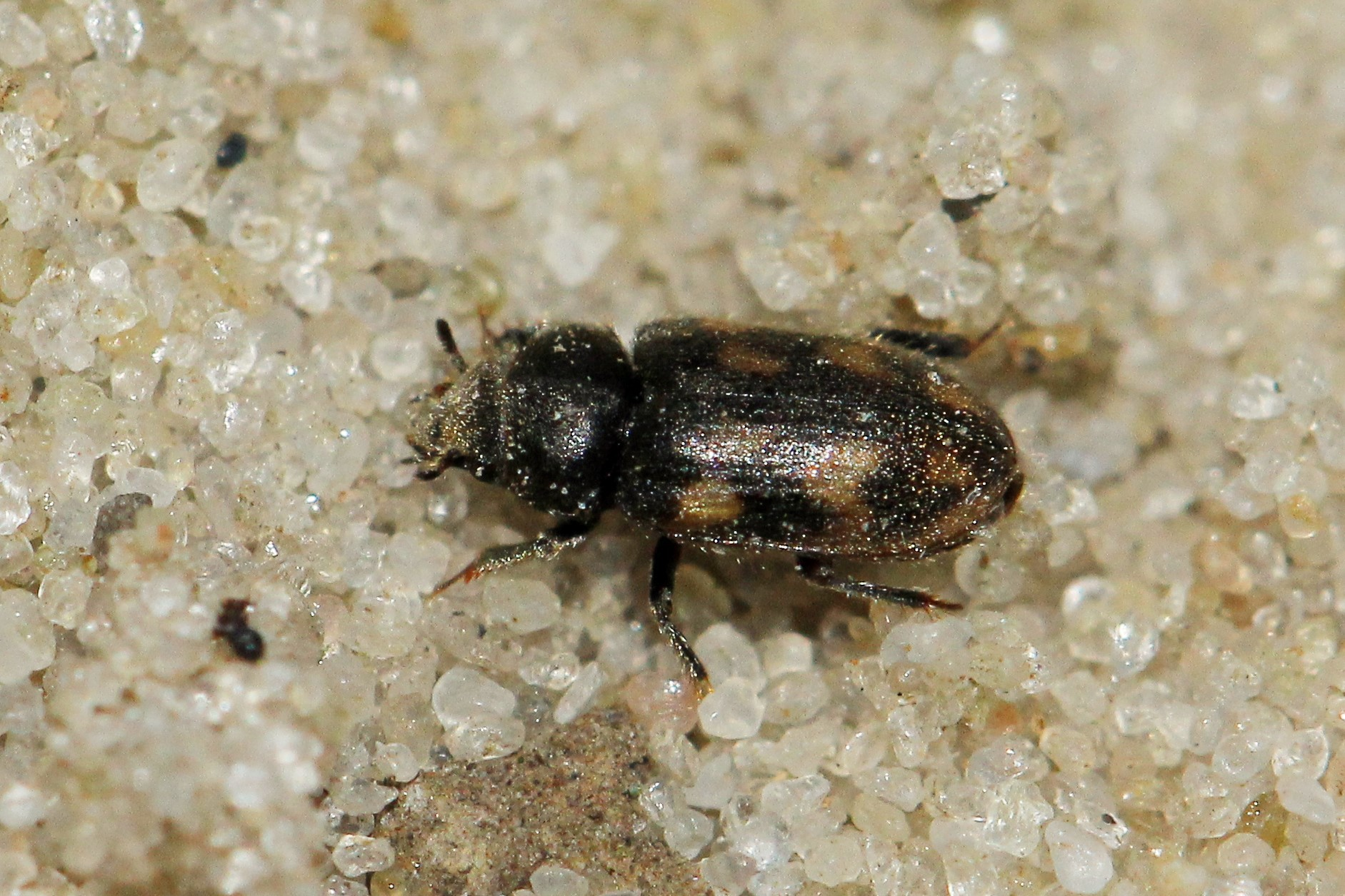
- Augyles hispidulus, Russia

Scientific classification
- Kingdom: Animalia
- Phylum: Arthropoda
- Class: Insecta
- Order: Coleoptera
- Suborder: Polyphaga
- Infraorder: Elateriformia
- Family: Heteroceridae
- Genus: Augyles; Schiödte, 1866

Synonyms
- Litorimus; Phyrites Schioedte, 1866

= Augyles =

Genus of beetles

Augyles is a genus of variegated mud-loving beetles belonging to the family Heteroceridae. The genus has an almost cosmopolitan distribution

== Species ==
The following species are recognised in the genus Augyles:

- Augyles aureolus (Schiödte, 1866)
- Augyles auromicans (Kiesenwetter, 1851)
- Augyles blanda Miller, 1994
- Augyles canadensis
- Augyles compactus (Fall, 1937)
- Augyles cribratellus
- Augyles davranogloui Skalický, 2019
- Augyles dilutissimus (Reitter, 1887)
- Augyles flavidus (Rossi, 1794)
- Augyles gravidus (Kiesenwetter, 1850)
- Augyles hispidulus (Kiesenwetter, 1843)
- Augyles intermedius (Kiesenwetter, 1843)
- Augyles interspidulus (Charpentier, 1979)
- Augyles letovi Sazhnev, 2018
- Augyles marmota (Kiesenwetter, 1850)
- Augyles niloticus
- Augyles obliteratus (Kiesenwetter, 1843)
- Augyles pallens
- Augyles pruinosus (Kiesenwetter, 1851)
- Augyles senescens (Kiesenwetter, 1865)
- Augyles sericans (Kiesenwetter, 1843)
- Augyles turanicus (Reitter, 1887)
