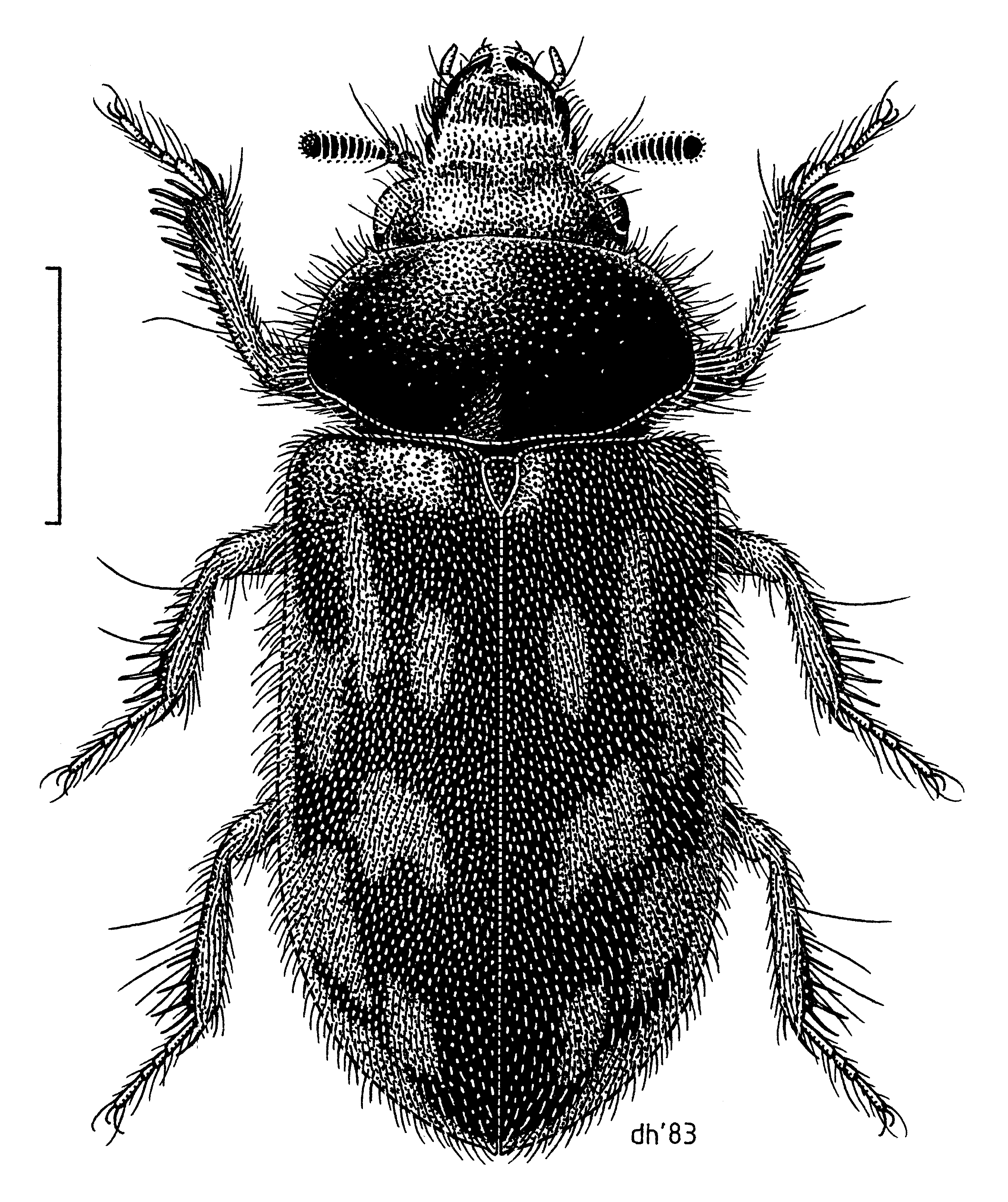
- Heterocerus novaeselandiae

Scientific classification
- Kingdom: Animalia
- Phylum: Arthropoda
- Clade: Pancrustacea
- Class: Insecta
- Order: Coleoptera
- Suborder: Polyphaga
- Infraorder: Elateriformia
- Superfamily: Byrrhoidea
- Family: Heteroceridae; MacLeay, 1825

= Heteroceridae =

Variegated mud-loving beetles Temporal range: Aptian–Recent

Family of beetles

Heteroceridae, the variegated mud-loving beetles, are a widespread and relatively common family of beetles found on every continent except for Antarctica.

Around two hundred and fifty species of heterocerids are known to occur worldwide. They are most diverse in tropical and sub-tropical regions. Currently, 87 species are known from the New World, including 34 from the United States.

Variegated mud-loving beetles are brownish, dorsoventrally depressed shoreline inhabitants. Superficially they resemble small scarabs with the tibiae armed with rows of robust flattened spines. The beetles live in shallow tunnels that they dig in damp soil around fresh and brackish lakes, rivers and ponds. Heterocerids have been reported to live in intertidal sandflats and on remote oceanic islands. The uniform way in which they live seems to have favored the conservation of a "phenotypical uniformity in external morphology". Consequently, it is often quite difficult to identify one of these beetles to species relying on external morphology alone. Therefore, male genitalia are most often relied upon to identify species. Although few studies have been conducted on their ecology, heterocerids have been shown to be an important prey group for passerine birds and frogs (Schmidt et al., 2003; Turner, 1959), and they appear to play a significant role in seed dispersal and burial in sandy soils. They are thought to be detritivores, consuming the substrate to sift for organic matter, microorganisms, and algae.

In the most recent revision of the family, Francisco Pacheco (1964) split the heterocerids into 20 different genera, erecting 17 new generic names based almost entirely on the features of male genitalia. Most systematists have found Pacheco's system complex and impractical because the ratio of genera to species is high and females cannot be identified. Consequently, his generic circumscriptions have not been widely accepted.

== Taxonomy ==
Thomas Say (1823) described Heterocerus pallidus and Heterocerus pusillus, the first New World species in the family. By the time George H. Horn (1890) produced his key to the genus Heterocerus, there were eleven described North American species in two genera. Horn's key relied heavily on general coloration and elytral pattern for species diagnosis. No other major taxonomic work concerning Heteroceridae was published until 1964, when Pacheco published his dissertation on the systematics, phylogeny and distribution of the family in the New World. Pacheco described 25 additional New World species. He produced worldwide (excluding Africa) identification keys based largely on characters of the male genitalia, leaving it impossible to identify females to species. Pacheco also split the heterocerids into 20 different genera, erecting 17 new generic names, once again relying heavily on characters of the male genitalia. Distribution maps are included in Pacheco's work; however, in his introduction, Pacheco admits that his work did not include enough material to create particularly informative distributions for many New World heterocerids. The only other monograph on the family Heteroceridae was published by Reinhold Charpentier (1965), and this encompassed the species of the Ethiopian region. Charpentier's work included two species level keys, one based on male genitalia, the other on external characteristics. Charpentier saw no justification in dividing the family into any new taxa and he retained all 35 Ethiopian species in the genus Heterocerus. He did note, however, the great difference between the male genitalia of various groups of species.

Little subsequent taxonomic work was conducted with the family until the late 1980s, when W. V. Miller began describing species from around the world (Miller 1988, 1992). Miller's work included the descriptions of seven new species from North America. These additions brought the number of North American species to 34. A key to 21 northeastern species, produced by Miller, appeared in Downie and Arnett's Beetles of Northeastern North America (1995). This key relies mostly on elytral color patterns for species identification. In his work, Miller chose to apply a taxonomic scheme in which the heterocerids are divided into only five genera worldwide. European authors, namely S. Skalický (Czech Republic) and A. Mascagni (Italy), have described numerous species in the last ten years.

The oldest fossils of the genus are from the Early Cretaceous (Aptian) of China and Mongolia, belonging to the genus Heterocerites.

== Genera ==
These 15 genera belong to the family Heteroceridae:

- Augyles Schiødte, 1866^{i c g b}
- Centuriatus Pacheco, 1964^{i c g}
- Efflagitatus Pacheco, 1964^{i c g}
- Explorator Pacheco, 1964^{i c g}
- Heterocerites Ponomarenko, 1986^{g}
- Heterocerus Fabricius, 1792^{i c g b}
- Lanternarius Pacheco, 1964^{i c g}
- Lapsus Pacheco, 1964^{i c g}
- Littorimus^{g}
- Micilus Mulsant & Rey, 1872^{g}
- Microaugyles Pacheco, 1964^{i c g}
- Neoheterocerus Pacheco, 1964^{i c g}
- Peditatus Pacheco, 1964^{i c g}
- Protoallopygmephorus^{g}
- Tropicus Pacheco, 1964^{i c g b}

Data sources: i = ITIS, c = Catalogue of Life, g = GBIF, b = Bugguide.net
