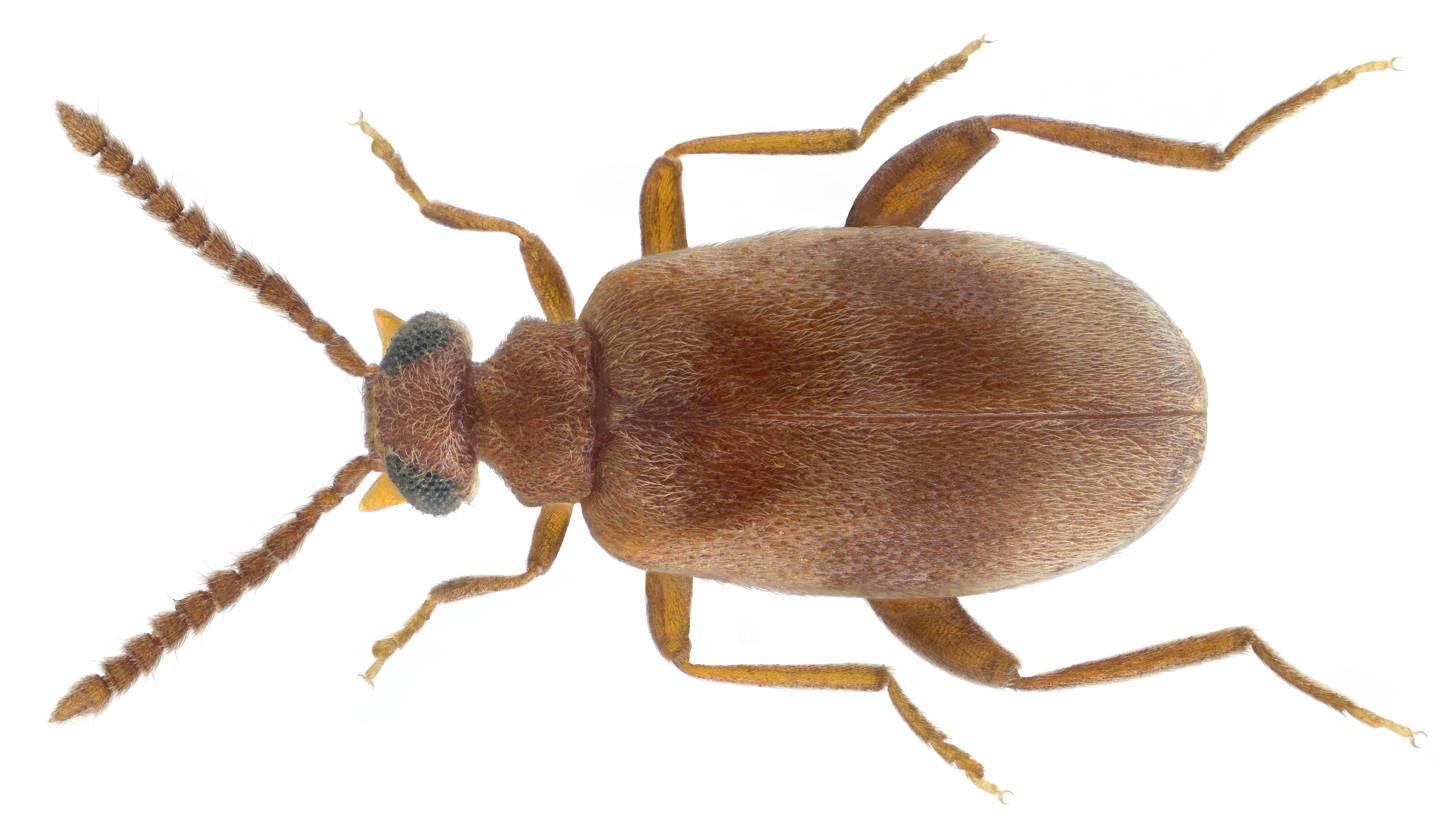
- Aderus populneus

Scientific classification
- Kingdom: Animalia
- Phylum: Arthropoda
- Clade: Pancrustacea
- Class: Insecta
- Order: Coleoptera
- Suborder: Polyphaga
- Infraorder: Cucujiformia
- Superfamily: Tenebrionoidea
- Family: Aderidae; Winkler, 1927

Genera
- about 40 genera

Synonyms
- Xylophilidae Shuckard, 1840 (Preocc.); Euglenidae Seidlitz, 1875 (Preocc.); Euglenesidae Seidlitz, 1875 (Suppr.); Hylophilidae Pic, 1900 (Preocc.); †Circaeidae Iablokoff-Khnzorian, 1961

= Aderidae =

Aderidae Temporal range: Cenomanian–Recent

Family of beetles

The Aderidae, sometimes called ant-like leaf beetles, are a family of beetles that bear some resemblance to ants. The family consists of about 1,000 species in about 40 genera, of which most are tropical, although overall distribution is worldwide.

As with the Anthicidae, their heads constrict just in front of the pronotum, forming a neck, although the posterior end of the pronotum is not usually as narrow. The eyes are hairy with a granular appearance. The first two abdominal sternites are fused, and in only some groups is a suture even visible. Sizes are 1–4 millimetres (1/32–5/32 in).

As the name suggests, most adults are found on the undersides of the leaves of shrubs and trees, while larvae have been found in rotting wood, leaf litter, and nests of other insects. The ecology of aderids is poorly known. Of the larvae whose ecology is known, some are saproxylic, while at least some of those who inhabit insect nests are parasitic.

The higher level taxonomy of the family has long been unclear. As of 2002, the last publication of a world catalog of the family was that of Maurice Pic in 1910. Some classification attempts for the family were made by Corella in 1948 and 1962 and Werner in 1990, but these were mostly ignored by other entomologists. The first DNA study of the taxonomy of the family was done in 2016.

The oldest confirmed member of the family is Gryzmalia from the mid Cretaceous Burmese amber of Myanmar. Older unnamed records have been reported from Early Cretaceous Lebanese amber.

== Genera ==
- Aderus
- Agacinosia
- Agenjosia
- Anidorus
- Ariotus
- Axylophilus
- Beltranosia
- Candidosia
- Carinatophilus
- Cedraderus
- Cnopus
- Cobososia
- Dasytomorphus
- Dusmetosia
- Elonus
- Emelinus
- Escalerosia
- Euglenes
- Ganascus
- Gompelia
- Gonzalosia
- Gymnoganascus
- Hintonosia
- Megaxenus
- Menorosia
- Mixaderus
- Phytobaenus
- Picemelinus
- Pseudananca
- Pseudanidorus
- Pseudariotus
- Pseudolotelus
- Pseudozena
- Saegerosia
- Scraptogetus
- Syzeton
- Syzetonellus
- Syzetoninus
- Tokiophilus
- Transrenus
- Vanonus
- Zarcosia
- Zenascus
- Zonantes
