= Diplocoelus rudis =

Scientific classification
- Domain: Eukaryota
- Kingdom: Animalia
- Phylum: Arthropoda
- Class: Insecta
- Order: Coleoptera
- Suborder: Polyphaga
- Infraorder: Cucujiformia
- Family: Biphyllidae
- Genus: Diplocoelus
- Species: D. rudis

Binomial name
- Diplocoelus rudis (LeConte, 1863)

Synonyms
- Diplocoelus philothermoides Reitter, 1877

Species of beetle

Diplocoelus rudis is a species of false skin beetle in the family Biphyllidae. It is found in North America.
