= Althaesia =

Scientific classification
- Kingdom: Animalia
- Phylum: Arthropoda
- Clade: Pancrustacea
- Class: Insecta
- Order: Coleoptera
- Suborder: Polyphaga
- Infraorder: Cucujiformia
- Family: Biphyllidae
- Genus: Althaesia; Pascoe, 1860

Genus of beetles

Althaesia is a genus of beetles in the family Biphyllidae, containing the following species:

- Althaesia acuminata Arrow, 1929
- Althaesia arrowi Grouvelle, 1914
- Althaesia leai Blackburn
- Althaesia pilosa Pascoe
- Althaesia sericeus Lea

"A."maxima is now in Diplocoelus.
