= Diplocoelus brunneus =

Scientific classification
- Domain: Eukaryota
- Kingdom: Animalia
- Phylum: Arthropoda
- Class: Insecta
- Order: Coleoptera
- Suborder: Polyphaga
- Infraorder: Cucujiformia
- Family: Biphyllidae
- Genus: Diplocoelus
- Species: D. brunneus

Binomial name
- Diplocoelus brunneus LeConte, 1863

Synonyms
- Diplocoelus angusticollis Horn, 1878

Species of beetle

Diplocoelus brunneus is a species of false skin beetle in the family Biphyllidae. It is found in North America.
