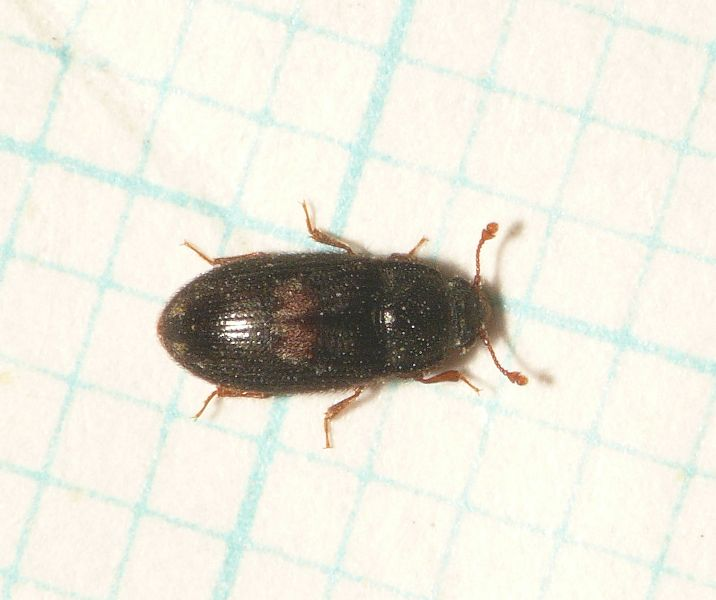

Scientific classification
- Kingdom: Animalia
- Phylum: Arthropoda
- Class: Insecta
- Order: Coleoptera
- Suborder: Polyphaga
- Infraorder: Cucujiformia
- Family: Biphyllidae
- Genus: Biphyllus
- Species: B. lunatus

Binomial name
- Biphyllus lunatus Fabricius, 1792

= Biphyllus lunatus =

Species of beetle

Biphyllus lunatus is a species of beetle in the family Biphyllidae.

The larvae feed on the fungus Daldinia concentrica.

The species' presence is used as an indicator for evaluating the ecological continuity of woodlands.

The humeral mark on the back of adults is a distinguishing feature.

== Description ==
Dark brown to black, each elytron with a transverse, angled patch of pale pubescens near the middle and often a sub-apical patch. Pubescence more evenly recumbent throughout. Antennal club 2-segmented. Some specimens have small patches of pale pubescence to the pronotum and a pale humeral mark. Adults are typically 3.0-3.3mm long.

== Range ==
Biphyllus lunatus is a very local and generally rare species in southern and central Europe and is considered to be threatened in many countries; it is widespread across North West Africa and extends east into southern Siberia and north into the UK and southern Fennoscandia. In the UK it is locally common throughout England and Wales though less so in the north and there are a very few records from southern Scotland.
