= Gonicoelus =

Scientific classification
- Kingdom: Animalia
- Phylum: Arthropoda
- Class: Insecta
- Order: Coleoptera
- Suborder: Polyphaga
- Infraorder: Cucujiformia
- Family: Biphyllidae
- Genus: Gonicoelus; Sharp, 1900

Genus of beetles

Gonicoelus is a genus of beetles in the family Biphyllidae, containing the following species:

- Gonicoelus affinis Grouvelle, 1902
- Gonicoelus angustus Sharp, 1900
- Gonicoelus arduus Sharp, 1900
- Gonicoelus armatus Grouvelle
- Gonicoelus bimargo Sharp, 1900
- Gonicoelus boliviensis Grouvelle
- Gonicoelus brevicollis Sharp, 1900
- Gonicoelus cavifrons Grouvelle
- Gonicoelus celatus Sharp, 1900
- Gonicoelus championi Sharp, 1900
- Gonicoelus chontalensis Sharp, 1900
- Gonicoelus concolor Sharp, 1900
- Gonicoelus convexicollis Grouvelle
- Gonicoelus crispatus Sharp, 1900
- Gonicoelus cultratus Sharp, 1900
- Gonicoelus deplanatus Sharp, 1900
- Gonicoelus difficilis Grouvelle
- Gonicoelus fryi Grouvelle
- Gonicoelus germanus Sharp, 1900
- Gonicoelus guatemalenus Sharp, 1900
- Gonicoelus hirtus Sharp, 1900
- Gonicoelus humilis Sharp, 1900
- Gonicoelus hystrix Sharp, 1900
- Gonicoelus interstitialis Grouvelle
- Gonicoelus laticollis Sharp, 1900
- Gonicoelus latus Sharp, 1900
- Gonicoelus longicornis Sharp, 1900
- Gonicoelus mediocris Sharp, 1900
- Gonicoelus mexicanus Sharp, 1900
- Gonicoelus minax Grouvelle
- Gonicoelus mollis Sharp, 1900
- Gonicoelus monticola Sharp, 1900
- Gonicoelus muticus Sharp, 1900
- Gonicoelus oopsis Sharp, 1900
- Gonicoelus parnoides Sharp, 1900
- Gonicoelus planus Sharp, 1900
- Gonicoelus pulvinatus Grouvelle
- Gonicoelus relictus Sharp, 1900
- Gonicoelus rudis Sharp, 1900
- Gonicoelus rufiventris Grouvelle
- Gonicoelus securiger Sharp, 1900
- Gonicoelus segnis Sharp, 1900
- Gonicoelus sellatus Sharp, 1900
- Gonicoelus serricollis Grouvelle
- Gonicoelus sharpi Grouvelle
- Gonicoelus spheniscus Sharp, 1900
- Gonicoelus subtilis Sharp, 1900
- Gonicoelus throscoides Sharp, 1900
- Gonicoelus tricornis Sharp, 1900
- Gonicoelus unicornis Sharp, 1900
- Gonicoelus vestitus Sharp, 1900
- Gonicoelus wagmero Grouvelle
