= Anchorius =

Anchorius lineatus

Scientific classification
- Kingdom: Animalia
- Phylum: Arthropoda
- Class: Insecta
- Order: Coleoptera
- Suborder: Polyphaga
- Infraorder: Cucujiformia
- Family: Biphyllidae
- Genus: Anchorius; Casey, 1900
- Species: A. lineatus

Binomial name
- Anchorius lineatus Casey, 1900

Genus of beetles

Anchorius lineatus is a species of beetle in the family Biphyllidae, the only species in the genus Anchorius.
