= Anobocaelus =

Scientific classification
- Kingdom: Animalia
- Phylum: Arthropoda
- Class: Insecta
- Order: Coleoptera
- Suborder: Polyphaga
- Infraorder: Cucujiformia
- Family: Biphyllidae
- Genus: Anobocaelus; Sharp, 1902

Genus of beetles

Anobocaelus is a genus of beetles in the family Biphyllidae, containing the following species:

- Anobocaelus arcanus Grouvelle, 1914
- Anobocaelus championi Sharp, 1902
- Anobocaelus lineatus Grouvelle
- Anobocaelus optatus Sharp, 1902
- Anobocaelus plicicollis Grouvelle
- Anobocaelus simplex Grouvelle
