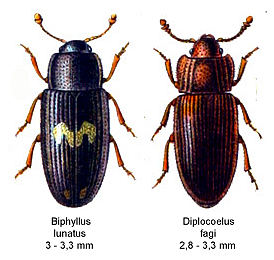

Scientific classification
- Kingdom: Animalia
- Phylum: Arthropoda
- Class: Insecta
- Order: Coleoptera
- Suborder: Polyphaga
- Infraorder: Cucujiformia
- Family: Biphyllidae
- Genus: Biphyllus; Dejean, 1821

= Biphyllus =

Genus of beetles

Biphyllus is a genus of beetles in the family Biphyllidae, containing the following species:

- Biphyllus aequalis (Reitter, 1889)
- Biphyllus africanus (Grouvelle, 1914)
- Biphyllus allaudi Grouvelle, 1906
- Biphyllus amabilis (Grouvelle, 1916)
- Biphyllus andrewesi (Grouvelle, 1916)
- Biphyllus bolivari Grouvelle, 1905
- Biphyllus brevis (Grouvelle, 1914)
- Biphyllus canaliculatus Grouvelle, 1906
- Biphyllus cardoni (Grouvelle, 1916)
- Biphyllus centromaculatus (Grouvelle, 1916)
- Biphyllus clavatus Arrow, 1929
- Biphyllus complexus Sasaji, 1983
- Biphyllus concolor Grouvelle, 1906
- Biphyllus corpulentus Arrow, 1929
- Biphyllus decoratus (Grouvelle, 1916)
- Biphyllus distinctus (Grouvelle, 1916)
- Biphyllus dollmani Arrow, 1929
- Biphyllus egens (Grouvelle, 1916)
- Biphyllus elegans (Arrow, 1929)
- Biphyllus escalerae Grouvelle, 1906
- Biphyllus euphorbiae (Peyerimhoff, 1923)
- Biphyllus fastidiosus (Grouvelle, 1916)
- Biphyllus flavonotatus (Lea, 1921)
- Biphyllus flexuosus Reitter, 1889
- Biphyllus formosianus (Grouvelle, 1914)
- Biphyllus frater Aubé, 1850
- Biphyllus frequens (Grouvelle, 1916)
- Biphyllus fulvus (Grouvelle, 1909)
- Biphyllus histrio Grouvelle, 1906
- Biphyllus humeralis (Reitter, 1889)
- Biphyllus inaequalis (Reitter, 1889)
- Biphyllus infans (Grouvelle, 1914)
- Biphyllus inops (Grouvelle, 1916)
- Biphyllus insignis (Grouvelle, 1914)
- Biphyllus japonicus Sasaji, 1983
- Biphyllus jongensis (Scott)
- Biphyllus kasuganus Nakane, 1988
- Biphyllus kolosovi Nikitsky, 1983
- Biphyllus kuzurius Sasaji, 1984
- Biphyllus lanuginosus (Grouvelle, 1914)
- Biphyllus latipes (Grouvelle, 1916)
- Biphyllus lewisii (Reitter, 1889)
- Biphyllus loochooanus Sasaji, 1991
- Biphyllus lunatus (Fabricius, 1787)
- Biphyllus maculatus Grouvelle, 1906
- Biphyllus madagascariensis Grouvelle, 1898
- Biphyllus magnus Grouvelle, 1906
- Biphyllus maindroni (Grouvelle, 1903)
- Biphyllus marmoratus (Reitter, 1889)
- Biphyllus marshalli (Grouvelle, 1911)
- Biphyllus medius (Grouvelle, 1914)
- Biphyllus micros (Grouvelle, 1900)
- Biphyllus minimus Grouvelle, 1905
- Biphyllus minutus (Grouvelle, 1902)
- Biphyllus molestus (Grouvelle, 1913)
- Biphyllus obscuronotatus (Lea, 1922)
- Biphyllus odiosus (Grouvelle, 1913)
- Biphyllus ornatellus (Blackburn, 1903)
- Biphyllus oshimanus Nakane, 1988
- Biphyllus parvulus Grouvelle, 1906
- Biphyllus rosti (Grouvelle, 1916)
- Biphyllus rufopictus (Wollaston, 1873)
- Biphyllus sarisberiensis (Scott)
- Biphyllus satsumanus Nakane, 1988
- Biphyllus sauteri (Grouvelle, 1914)
- Biphyllus schenklingi (Grouvelle, 1914)
- Biphyllus semifuscus (Grouvelle, 1914)
- Biphyllus sicardi Grouvelle, 1906
- Biphyllus sjoestedti (Grouvelle, 1909)
- Biphyllus strigicollis (Scott)
- Biphyllus subellipticus (Wollaston, 1862)
- Biphyllus substriatus (Grouvelle, 1916)
- Biphyllus suffusus (Reitter)
- Biphyllus tenuis (Grouvelle, 1916)
- Biphyllus throscoides (Wollaston, 1873)
- Biphyllus tolae (Scott)
- Biphyllus turneri Arrow, 1929
- Biphyllus typhaeoides (Wollaston, 1862)
- Biphyllus undulatus Grouvelle, 1906
- Biphyllus uniformis (Grouvelle, 1914)
- Biphyllus ussuriensis Nikitsky, 1983
- Biphyllus variegatus (Scott)
- Biphyllus weisei (Grouvelle, 1914)
