= Euderopus =

Scientific classification
- Kingdom: Animalia
- Phylum: Arthropoda
- Class: Insecta
- Order: Coleoptera
- Suborder: Polyphaga
- Infraorder: Cucujiformia
- Family: Biphyllidae
- Genus: Euderopus; Sharp, 1900

Genus of beetles

Euderopus is a genus of beetles in the family Biphyllidae, containing the following species:

- Euderopus brevipes Sharp, 1900
- Euderopus iteratus Sharp, 1900
- Euderopus meridionalis Grouvelle
- Euderopus microps Sharp, 1900
- Euderopus perbrevis Sharp, 1900
- Euderopus regularis Sharp, 1900
- Euderopus setosus Sharp, 1900
- Euderopus unicolor Sharp, 1900
