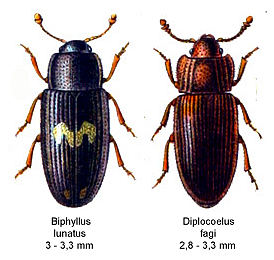
- Diplocoelus fagi on right

Scientific classification
- Kingdom: Animalia
- Phylum: Arthropoda
- Clade: Pancrustacea
- Class: Insecta
- Order: Coleoptera
- Suborder: Polyphaga
- Infraorder: Cucujiformia
- Family: Biphyllidae
- Genus: Diplocoelus; Guérin-Méneville, 1836

= Diplocoelus =

Genus of beetles

Diplocoelus is a genus of beetles in the family Biphyllidae, containing the following species:

- Diplocoelus amplicollis Reitter, 1877
- Diplocoelus angustulus Blackburn, 1891
- Diplocoelus apicicollis Lea, 1921
- Diplocoelus atomus Grouvelle, 1916
- Diplocoelus bicolor Sharp, 1900
- Diplocoelus bombycinus Grouvelle, 1903
- Diplocoelus brunneus LeConte, 1863
- Diplocoelus consobrinus Grouvelle, 1905
- Diplocoelus costulatus Chevrolat, 1863
- Diplocoelus decemlineatus Lea, 1922
- Diplocoelus dilataticollis Lea, 1921
- Diplocoelus dubitabilis Grouvelle
- Diplocoelus exiguus Blackburn, 1891
- Diplocoelus fagi Guérin-Méneville, 1838
- Diplocoelus fasciatus MacLeay, 1903
- Diplocoelus fasciolatus Grouvelle
- Diplocoelus foveolatus Reitter
- Diplocoelus hispidus Grouvelle
- Diplocoelus humerosus Reitter, 1876
- Diplocoelus indicus Motschulsky, 1866
- Diplocoelus latus Lea, 1895
- Diplocoelus leai Blackburn, 1894
- Diplocoelus marginatus Grouvelle
- Diplocoelus mauritii Grouvelle, 1908
- Diplocoelus maximus (Lea) (formerly in Althaesia)
- Diplocoelus opacior Blackburn, 1903
- Diplocoelus ovatus MacLeay, 1903
- Diplocoelus parnoides Grouvelle, 1903
- Diplocoelus parvus Sharp, 1900
- Diplocoelus pilinotatus Lea, 1922
- Diplocoelus platysomus Lea, 1922
- Diplocoelus probiphyllus Vitali, 2010 Baltic amber
- Diplocoelus punctatus Lea, 1895
- Diplocoelus rudis (LeConte, 1863)
- Diplocoelus sericens Lea, 1921
- Diplocoelus similis Grouvelle, 1898
- Diplocoelus simoni Grouvelle
- Diplocoelus talyshensis Nikitsky, 1993
- Diplocoelus tessellatus Reitter
- Diplocoelus turbinatus Grouvelle, 1905
- Diplocoelus villosus Grouvelle, 1905
- Diplocoelus xanthorrhoeae Lea, 1921
