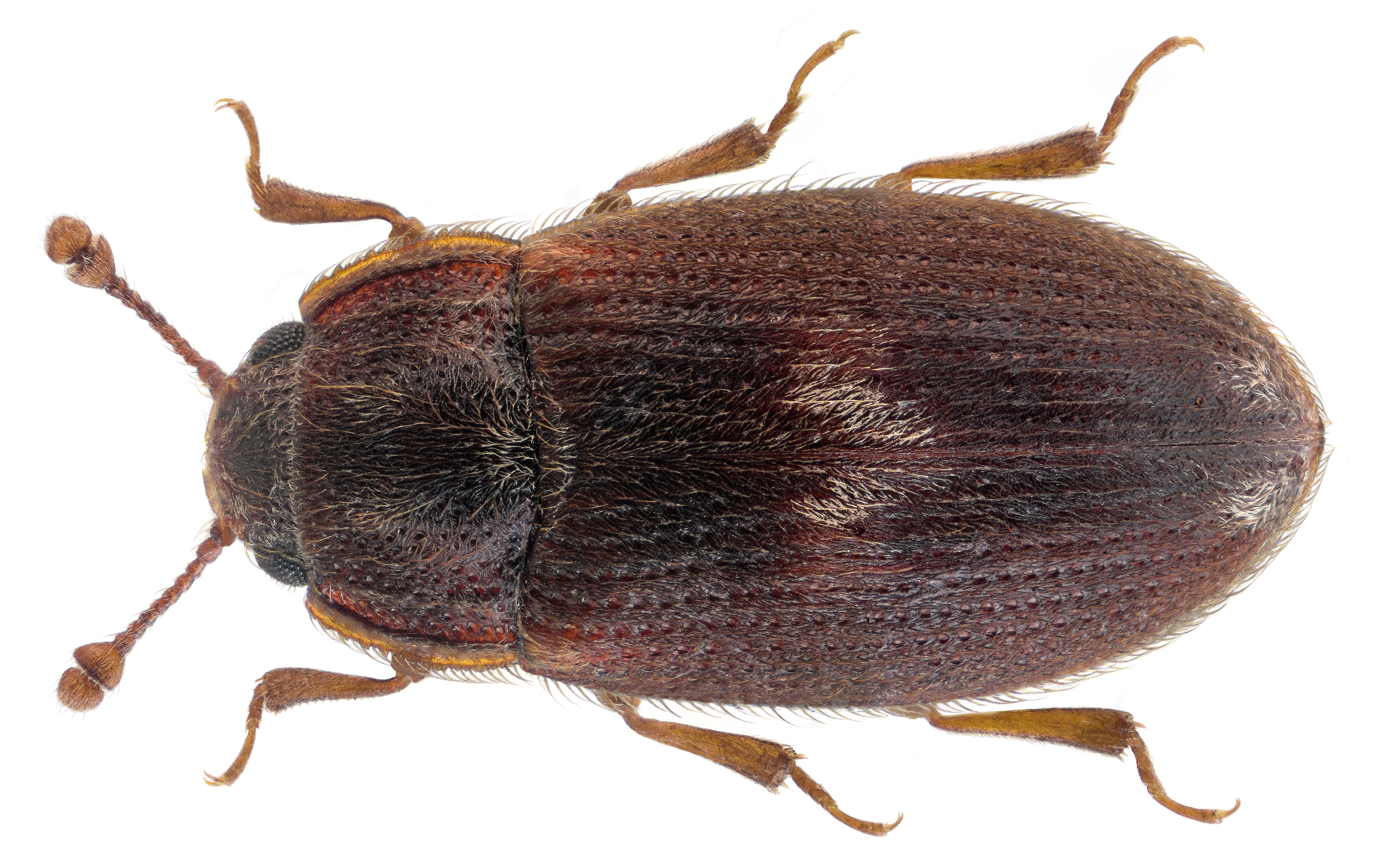
- Biphyllus lunatus

Scientific classification
- Kingdom: Animalia
- Phylum: Arthropoda
- Class: Insecta
- Order: Coleoptera
- Suborder: Polyphaga
- Infraorder: Cucujiformia
- Superfamily: Cleroidea
- Family: Biphyllidae; LeConte, 1861

= Biphyllidae =

Biphyllidae Temporal range: Santonian–Recent

Family of beetles

Biphyllidae, or false skin beetles, are a family of beetles, in the superfamily Cleroidea. They have a cosmopolitan distribution (excluding New Zealand). About 195 species are known. They live under the bark of dead trees and in leaf litter, and are mycophagous, feeding on fungi.

== Taxonomy ==
The family contains the following genera:

- Althaesia Pascoe, 1860
- Anchorius Casey, 1900
- Anobocaelus Sharp, 1902
- Biphyllus Dejean, 1821
- Diplocoelus Guérin-Méneville, 1836
- Euderopus Sharp, 1900
- Gonicoelus Sharp, 1900
- †Paleobiphyllus Makarov and Perkovsky 2019 Taimyr amber, Russia, Late Cretaceous (Santonian)
