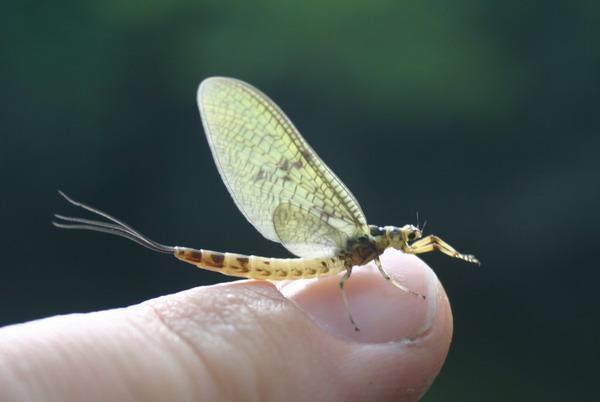
- The Green Drake (Ephemera danica), a mayfly (Ephemeroptera: Ephemeridae)

Scientific classification
- Kingdom: Animalia
- Phylum: Arthropoda
- Clade: Pancrustacea
- Class: Insecta
- Subclass: Pterygota
- Infraclass: Palaeoptera; Martynov, 1923

Superorders
- Ephemeropteroidea; Odonatoptera; †Palaeodictyopteroidea (extinct; disputed)

= Palaeoptera =

Palaeoptera Temporal range: Carboniferous - present

Taxonomic grouping of winged insects without a certain form of wing-folding

The name Palaeoptera (from Greek παλαιός (palaiós 'old') + πτερόν (pterón 'wing')) has been traditionally applied to those ancestral groups of winged insects (most of them extinct) that lack the ability to fold the wings back over the abdomen as characterizes the Neoptera. The Diaphanopterodea, which are palaeopteran insects, had independently and uniquely evolved a different wing-folding mechanism.

Current living palaeopteran lineages are Ephemeroptera (mayflies) and Odonata (dragonflies and damselflies).

== Physiological similarities ==
Both mayflies and dragonflies lack any of the smell centers in their brain found in Neoptera. Their midgut epithelium has a dual origin: the anterior and posterior regions develop through cellular differentiation, while the central region originates from yolk cells. In all other winged insects, the midgut epithelium is formed solely by cellular differentiation, whereas in the remaining hexapods, including Apterygota, it develops entirely from yolk cells, which suggests that Palaeoptera represent a transitional stage between these two developmental strategies.

== Disputed status ==
The existence of Palaeoptera as a monophyletic group has been one of the most important open problems in insect phylogeny. The complexities of the wing-folding mechanism, as well as the mechanical operation of the wings in flight (indirect flight muscles), are such that it indicates that Neoptera is a monophyletic lineage. The plesiomorphic absence of wing-folding however does not necessarily mean the Palaeoptera form a natural group. In any case, three main palaeopteran lineages, traditionally treated as superorders, are recognized.

As of 2026, the relationship of the two living Palaeopteran groups – Ephemeroptera (mayflies) and Odonata (dragonflies and damselflies) is not considered fully resolved. Three possibilities exist: Palaeoptera as a monophyletic group, Ephemeroptera being closer to Neoptera than Odonata (the Chiastomyaria hypothesis), or viceversa Odonata being closer to Neoptera than Ephemerophera (the Metapterygota hypothesis). The Palaeodictyopteroidea themselves might be a paraphyletic assemblage of basal Pterygota, too.

A 2026 phylogenomic study, using genomic and transcriptomic data from 101 species, supported the monophyly of living Palaeoptera, reconciling morphological and molecular data. The same study dated their emergence to the Late Devonian.

== See also ==
- Archedictyon
- Neoptera
