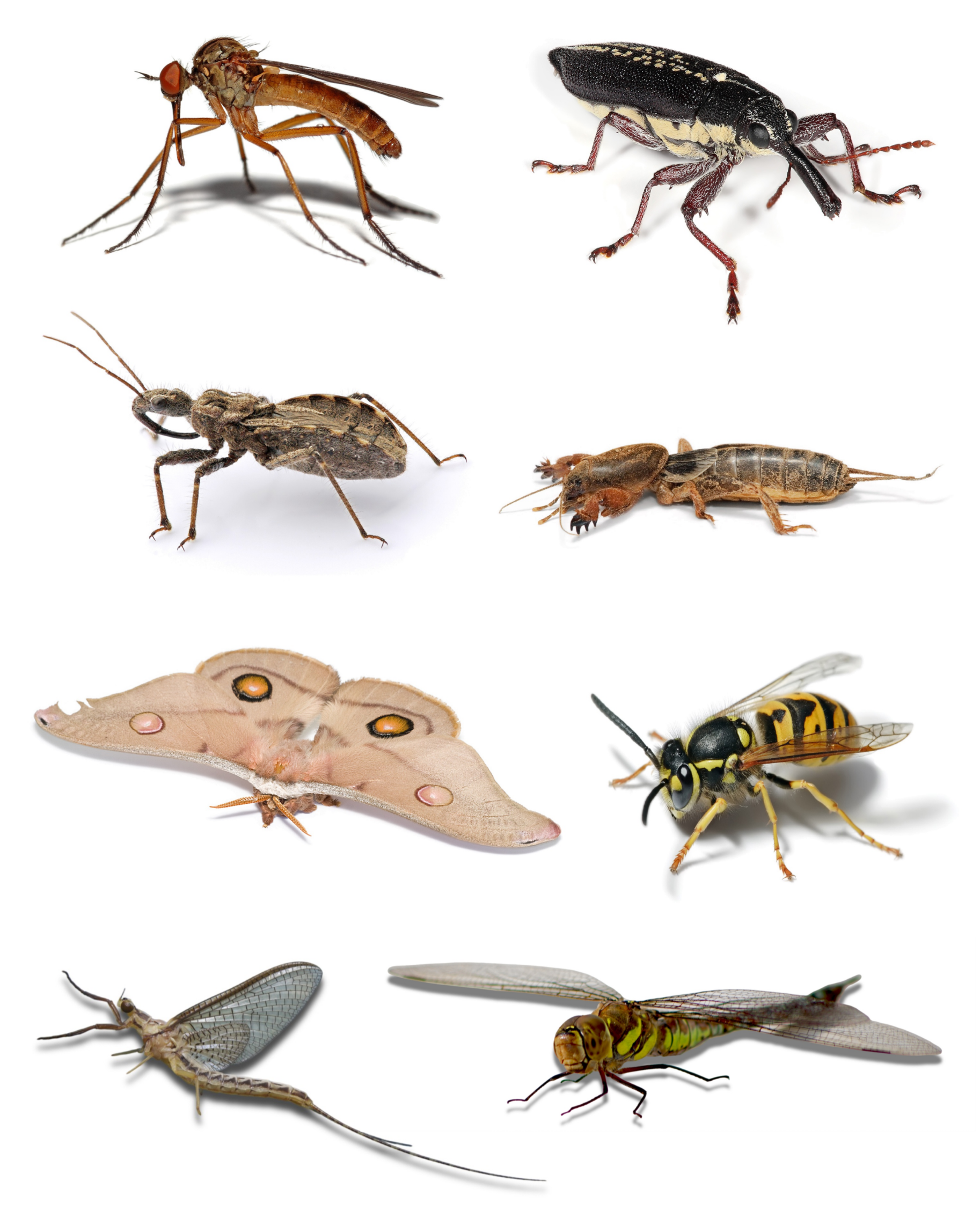
- Clockwise from top left: dance fly (Empis livida); long-nosed weevil (Rhinotia hemistictus); mole cricket (Gryllotalpa brachyptera); German wasp (Vespula germanica); migrant hawker (Aeshna mixta); unidentified mayfly (Ephemeroptera); emperor gum moth (Opodiphthera eucalypti); assassin bug (Harpactorinae)

Scientific classification
- Kingdom: Animalia
- Phylum: Arthropoda
- Clade: Pancrustacea
- Class: Insecta
- Clade: Dicondylia
- Subclass: Pterygota; Gegenbaur, 1878

Subdivisions
- † Palaeodictyopteroidea; Panephemeroptera (total group Ephemeroptera); Metapterygota; Odonatoptera; Neoptera; Polyneoptera; Eumetabola; Paraneoptera; Holometabola

= Pterygota =

Pterygota Temporal range: Serpukhovian–Recent

Subclass of insects

Pterygota (/ˌtɛrəˈɡoʊtə/ terrə-GOH-tə Ancient Greek: πτερυγωτός, romanized: pterugōtós, lit. 'winged') is a subclass of insects that includes all winged insects and groups which lost them secondarily.

Pterygota group comprises 99.9% of all insects. The orders not included are the Archaeognatha (jumping bristletails) and the Zygentoma (silverfishes and firebrats), two primitively wingless insect orders. Unlike Archaeognatha and Zygentoma, the pterygotes do not have styli or vesicles on their abdomen (also absent in some zygentomans), and with the exception of the majority of mayflies, are also missing the median terminal filament which is present in the ancestrally wingless insects.

The oldest known representatives of the group appeared during the mid-Carboniferous, around 328–324 million years ago, and the group subsequently underwent rapid diversification. Claims that they originated substantially earlier during the Silurian or Devonian based on molecular clock estimates are unlikely based on the fossil record, and are likely analytical artefacts.

== Systematics ==
Traditionally, this group was divided into the infraclasses Paleoptera and Neoptera. The former are nowadays strongly suspected of being paraphyletic, and better treatments (such as dividing or dissolving the group) are presently being discussed. In addition, it is not clear how exactly the neopterans are related among each other. The Exopterygota might be a similar assemblage of rather ancient hemimetabolous insects among the Neoptera like the Palaeoptera are among insects as a whole. The holometabolous Endopterygota seem to be very close relatives, indeed, but nonetheless appear to contain several clades of related orders, the status of which is not agreed upon.

The following scheme uses finer divisions than the one above, which is not well-suited to correctly accommodating the fossil groups.

=== Classification ===
- Order Ephemeroptera (mayflies)
- Superorder Palaeodictyopteroidea
  - Order Palaeodictyoptera †(extinct)
  - Order Megasecoptera †(extinct)
  - Order Permothemistida or Dicliptera insects†(extinct)
  - Order Diaphanopterodea †(extinct)
- Metapterygota
  - Superorder Odonatoptera
    - Order Protodonata or Meganisoptera †(extinct)
    - Order Protanisoptera †(extinct)
    - Order Triadophlebioptera †(extinct)
    - Order Protozygoptera or Archizygoptera †(extinct)
    - Order Odonata (dragonflies and damselflies)
  - Infraclass Neoptera
    - Polyneoptera
      - Order Caloneurodea †(extinct)
      - Order Glosselytrodea †(extinct)
      - Order Titanoptera †(extinct)
      - Order Protorthoptera †(extinct)
      - Order Plecoptera (stoneflies)
      - Order Embioptera (webspinners)
      - Order Zoraptera (angel insects)
      - Order Dermaptera (earwigs)
      - Order Orthoptera (grasshoppers, etc.)
      - Order Phasmatodea (stick insects)
      - Clade Notoptera
        - Order Grylloblattodea (ice-crawlers)
        - Order Mantophasmatodea (gladiators)
      - Superorder Dictyoptera
        - Order Blattodea (cockroaches and termites)
        - Order Mantodea (mantises)
        - Order Alienoptera †(extinct)
    - Eumetabola
      - Order Miomoptera †(extinct)
      - Paraneoptera
        - Order Psocodea (booklice, barklice, lice)
        - Superorder Condylognatha
          - Order Thysanoptera (thrips)
          - Order Hemiptera (true bugs)
      - Endopterygota
        - Superorder Hymenopterida
          - Order Hymenoptera (ants, bees, etc.)
        - Aparaglossata
          - Neuropteroidea
            - Superorder Neuropterida
              - Order Raphidioptera (snakeflies)
              - Order Megaloptera (alderflies, etc.)
              - Order Neuroptera (net-veined insects)
            - Superorder Coleopterida
              - Order Coleoptera (beetles)
              - Order Strepsiptera (twisted-winged parasites)
          - Superorder Panorpida
            - Antliophora
              - Mecopteroidea
                - Order Mecoptera (scorpionflies, etc.)
                - Order Siphonaptera (fleas)
              - Order Diptera (true flies)
              - Order Protodiptera †(extinct)
            - Amphiesmenoptera
              - Order Trichoptera (caddisflies)
              - Order Lepidoptera (butterflies, moths)
