= Permothemistida =

Permothemistida Temporal range: Permian (Kungarian) — (Roadian), 279.3–268 Ma

Scientific classification
- Kingdom: Animalia
- Phylum: Arthropoda
- Clade: Pancrustacea
- Class: Insecta
- Superorder: †Palaeodictyopterida
- Order: †Permothemistida; Martynov, 1938

Families
- †Diathemidae Sinichenkova, 1980; †Permothemistidae Martynov, 1935

Synonyms
- Archodonata Martynov, 1932; Dicliptera Grimaldi & Engel, 2005

Extinct order of insects

Permothemistida is an extinct order of palaeozoic paleopterous insects.

The order was originally named Permothemistida by Martynov (1938), synonymized with Palaeodictyoptera by Carpenter (1992) and replaced by the name Dicliptera in 2005 by Grimaldi and Engel.

Dicliptera is still used as a name for the order in 2019.

The family Diathemidae, containing the species "Diathema concinnum" and "Diathema tenerum" have been assigned to Permothemistida/ Dicliptera.
