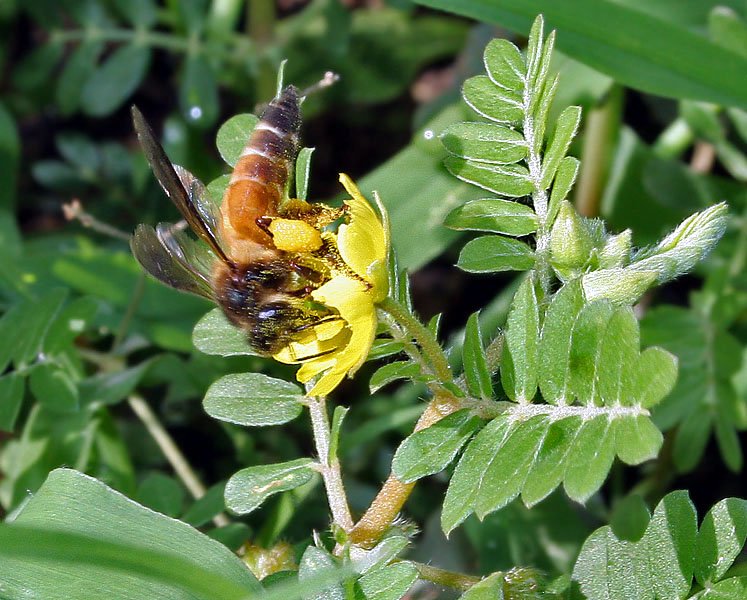
- Giant honey bee Apis dorsata (order Hymenoptera) on Tribulus terrestris

Scientific classification
- Kingdom: Animalia
- Phylum: Arthropoda
- Clade: Pancrustacea
- Class: Insecta
- Subclass: Pterygota
- Branch: Metapterygota

Subgroups
- Odonatoptera; Neoptera

= Metapterygota =

Clade of insects containing Superorder Odonatoptera and Infraclass Neoptera

Metapterygota is a putative clade of winged insects containing order Odonata and Infraclass Neoptera. They share morphological characteristics of a loss of caudal filaments and a subimago stage. Genetically the clade had been suggested by similarities in the mitochondrial genomes. A 2026 molecular phylogenetics study rejected Metapterygota and supported intestead the monophyly of Palaeoptera as a clade.
