= Olga M. Martynova =

Soviet paleoentomologist

Olga Mikhailovna Martynova
- Born: Olga Mikhailovna Aleksandrova; Ольга Михайловна Мартынова; July 19, 1900; Saint Petersburg, Russian Empire
- Died: February 18, 1997 (aged 96); Moscow, Russia
- Occupations: Entomologist; Palaeoentomologist
- Known for: work on Trichoptera, Neuoptera and Mecoptera
- Spouse: Andrey Vasilyevich Martynov

Olga Mikhailovna Martynova (19 July 1900 – 18 February 1997) was a Russian palaeoentomologist.

== Biography ==
Martynova was born Olga Mikhailovna Aleksandrova in Saint Petersburg on 19 July 1900. At university she became interested in freshwater insects, taking part in a scientific expedition to Karelia where she met her future husband and scientific partner, Professor Andrey Vasilyevich Martynov (1879-1938). Martynova later supplied a personal account of her marriage to Prof Martynov, for Vladimir Ivanov's biography of her husband, recalling that when they first met, Prof Martynov had considered her presence in his laboratory unwelcome, but that he had eventually found her assistance in his work to be indispensable. The couple had one daughter who died in infancy, and a son named Nikolai who became an engineer.

During World War II, Martynova was part of the team responsible for moving the Soviet National Academy of Sciences' insect collection to the copper mines at Kargala for protection, and she helped monitor and protect the collection remaining in the Academy building in Moscow from incendiary bombs during air raids.

After the war, Martynova continued in her studies and was particularly known for work on fossil insects and for curating the Russian State palaeoentomology collections. Martynova had dispensation to travel overseas for work and she attended the International Congress of Entomology at Vienna in 1960, presenting her paper on the camel-necked flies (Raphidioptera) of the Permian and Carboniferous periods.

Martynova died on 18 February 1997.

Taxonomic genera for fossil insects described by Martynova during her career include:

- Eoglosselytrum Martynova, 1952 (order Glosselytrodea).
- Narynia Martynova, 1967 (order Entomobryomorpha).
- Proraphidia Martynova, 1947 (order Raphidioptera).

== Selected works ==
[note: a detailed list of Martynova's most important works features in Sukatsheva and Ivanov, 2002]

- Martynova, O.M. (1947). "Two new Raphidioptera from Jurassic shales of Karatau". Doklady Akademii Nauk SSSR (in Russian). 56: 635–637 – via Lacewing Digital Library.
- Martynova, O.M. (1952). "Order Glosselytrodea in Permian deposits of Kemerovo Region". Trudy Paleontologicheskogo Instituta (in Russian). 40. Akademii Nauk SSSR: 187–196.
- Martynova, O.M. (1954). "Neuropterous Insects from the Cretaceous deposits of Siberia". Doklady Akademii Nauk SSSR (in Russian). 94: 1167–1169.
- Martynova, O.M. (1960). "Die Kamelhalsfliegen aus dem Perm und Karbon". XI Internationaler Kongreß für Entomologie: Band I (1–6) (in German): 302–304.
- Martynova, O.M. (1962). "9. Arthropoda and Chelicerata". In Rohendorf, B.B. (ed.). Fundamentals of Paleontology (in Russian). Akademii Nauk SSSR. pp. 45–48, 111–115, 139–144, 157–160, 236–239, 268, 269–282, 283–302, 345–359.
  - Martynova wrote the sections: Class Insecta, taxonomic part. Subclass Apterygota. Orders Collembola, Diplura, Thysanura, Monura, Manteodea, Isoptera, Dermaptera, Embioptera, Miomoptera, Caloneurodea, Glosselytrodea, Phasmatodea. Superordo Thysanopteroidea. Orders Thysanoptera, Strepsiptera, Megaloptera, Raphidioptera, Neuroptera, Mecoptera, Trichoptera, Hymenoptera
- Aspöck, Horst; Aspöck, Ulrike; Martynova, O.M. (1969). "Untersuchungen ueber die Rhaphidiiden-Fauna der Sowjet-Union (Insecta, Raphidioptera)" [Studies on the Raphidiidae fauna of the Soviet Union]. Tijdschrift voor Entomologie (in German). 112: 123–164 – via Biodiversity Heritage Library.
