= Archedictyon =

Hypothetical scheme of wing venation

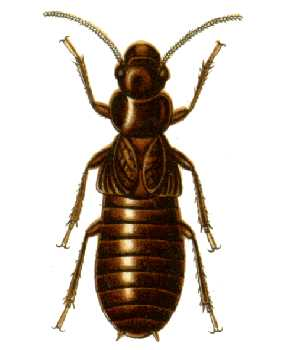
Mastotermes darwiniensis or Darwin termite, is an extant species of Australian insect showing archedictyon wing venation.

Archedictyon (from Greek Arche meaning first, original, ancient, primitive, or most basic and dictyo- meaning net or netlike, plural "archedictya") is a name given to a hypothetical scheme of wing venation proposed for the common ancestor of all winged insects.

== Description ==
The nature of the archedictyon is an important consideration in the taxonomic classification of the large, primitive Palaeozoic insects known as Palaeodictyoptera and was used by Adolphe-Théodore Brongniart for this purpose as early as 1854. A National Museum of Natural History database for the study of ants, wasps, bees and termites describes the archedictyon as:

...the primitive original vein network characterizing the wings of many of the most ancient insect fossils (T-B, after Needham; Mackerras, in CSIRO); in Mastotermitidae and Hodotermitidae (Isoptera), the complex network or reticulum of irregular veinlets between the veins in the apical 3 quarters of both wings, including the anal lobe (Emerson).

According to a 2000 scientific paper about the evolution of flight in Palaeozoic Palaeoptera, although the archedictyon of some Palaeodictyoptera have long been believed to be generalized plesiomorphic reticulation from which true cross veins developed through evolution, these may actually be an adaptive feature.

== Structure ==
The archedictyon is believed to have contained between six and eight longitudinal veins, but current understanding of the design is based on a combination of fossil data and speculation.

The "Comstock-Needham system" designed by entomologists John Henry Comstock and George Needham describes these veins and their branches:

- Costa (C): the leading edge of the wing
- Subcosta (Sc): the second longitudinal vein (behind the costa), typically unbranched
- Radius (R): the third longitudinal vein, one to five branches reach the wing margin
- Media (M): the fourth longitudinal vein, one to four branches reach the wing margin
- Cubitus (Cu): fifth longitudinal vein, one to three branches reach the wing margin
- Anal veins (A1, A2, A3): the unbranched veins behind the cubitus

Crossveins are named based on their relative position to the more prominent longitudinal veins:

- C-SC crossveins run between the costa and subcosta
- R crossveins run between adjacent branches of the radius
- R-M crossveins run between the radius and media
- M-CU crossveins run between the media and cubitus

== Extant species ==
The hypothetical primitive wing venation pattern is often used as a basis for describing the pattern in modern insects.

In extant insects, the term implies a retention of primitive characteristics but not necessarily a simplicity of design in comparison to the veinous network of other modern insect wings. Contemporary insects with wings to which the term archedictyon has been applied include the termite Mastotermes darwiniensis from Australia (illustration) and the praying mantis Orthodera novaezealandiae from New Zealand.

The term is also used in the discussion of phasmids and in such case refers to:

A network of non-directional veins in the costal region of the wing or in the elytron. It is these veins which make the elytron and costal region of the hindwing thicker and stiffer than the anal region of the hindwing.

== See also ==
- Insect flight

== Bibliography ==
- Prokop, Jakub; Nel, André (April 2007). "An enigmatic Palaeozoic stem-group: Paoliida, designation of new taxa from the Upper Carboniferous of the Czech Republic (Insecta: Paoliidae, Katerinkidae fam. n.)". African Invertebrates. 48 (1): 77–86. hdl:10520/EJC84589.
