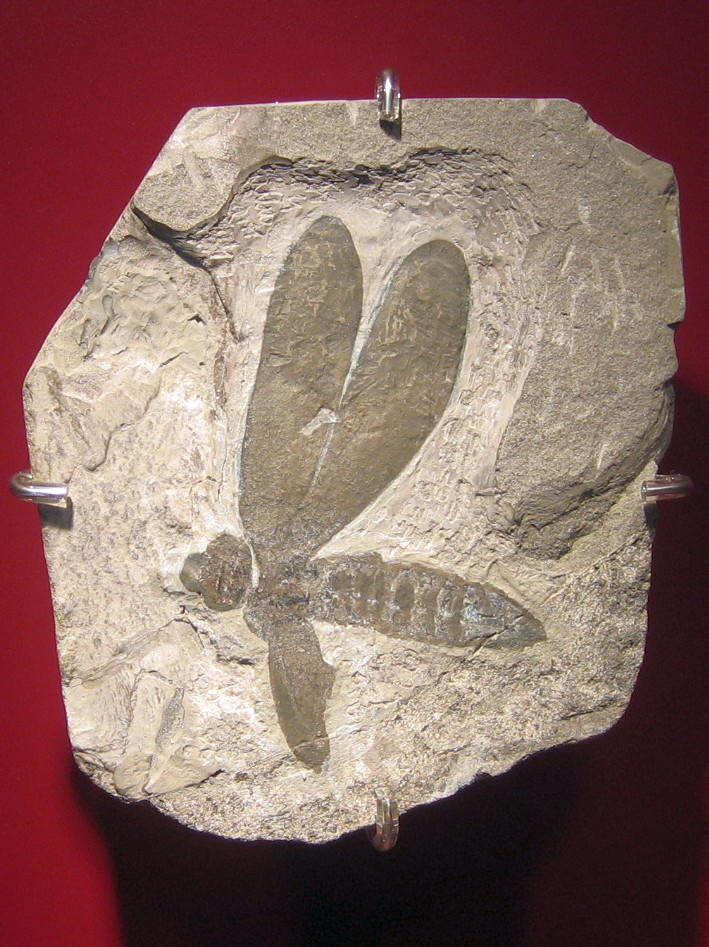
- Caloneura dowsoni fossil

Scientific classification
- Kingdom: Animalia
- Phylum: Arthropoda
- Class: Insecta
- Infraclass: Neoptera
- Cohort: Polyneoptera
- Order: †Caloneurodea; Martynov, 1938

Families
- See text

= Caloneurodea =

Caloneurodea Temporal range: Moscovian–Triassic

Extinct order of insects

Caloneurodea is an extinct order of polyneopteran neopteran insects in the superorder Orthopterida. Caloneurodea is known from fossils found in North America, Europe, Russia, and Asia and had a paleogeographic range confined to Laurussia.

== Families and genera ==
Order Caloneurodea

- Amboneuridae
  - Amboneura
- Anomalogrammatidae
  - Anomalogramma Carpenter, 1943
- Apsidoneuridae Carpenter, 1961
  - Apsidoneura Carpenter, 1943
  - Homaloptila Handlirsch, 1919
  - Sinaspidoneura Huang et al., 2020
- Caloneuridae Handlirsch, 1906
  - Caloneura Brongniart, 1885
  - Gigagramma Béthoux, Nel & Lapeyrie, 2004
  - Ligogramma Beckemeyer, 2009
- Euthygrammatidae
  - Euthygramma
- Paleuthygrammatidae
  - Paleuthygramma
  - Pseudogramma Carpenter, 1943
  - Vilvia
  - Vilviopsis
- Permobiellidae
  - Permobiella
  - Pseudobiella
- Pleisiogrammmatidae
  - Pleisiogramma Carpenter, 1943
- Synomaloptilidae
  - Synomaloptilidae
  - Caloneurella
  - Pruvostiella
- Family Incertae sedis
  - Lusitaneura Loureiro et al., 2010
