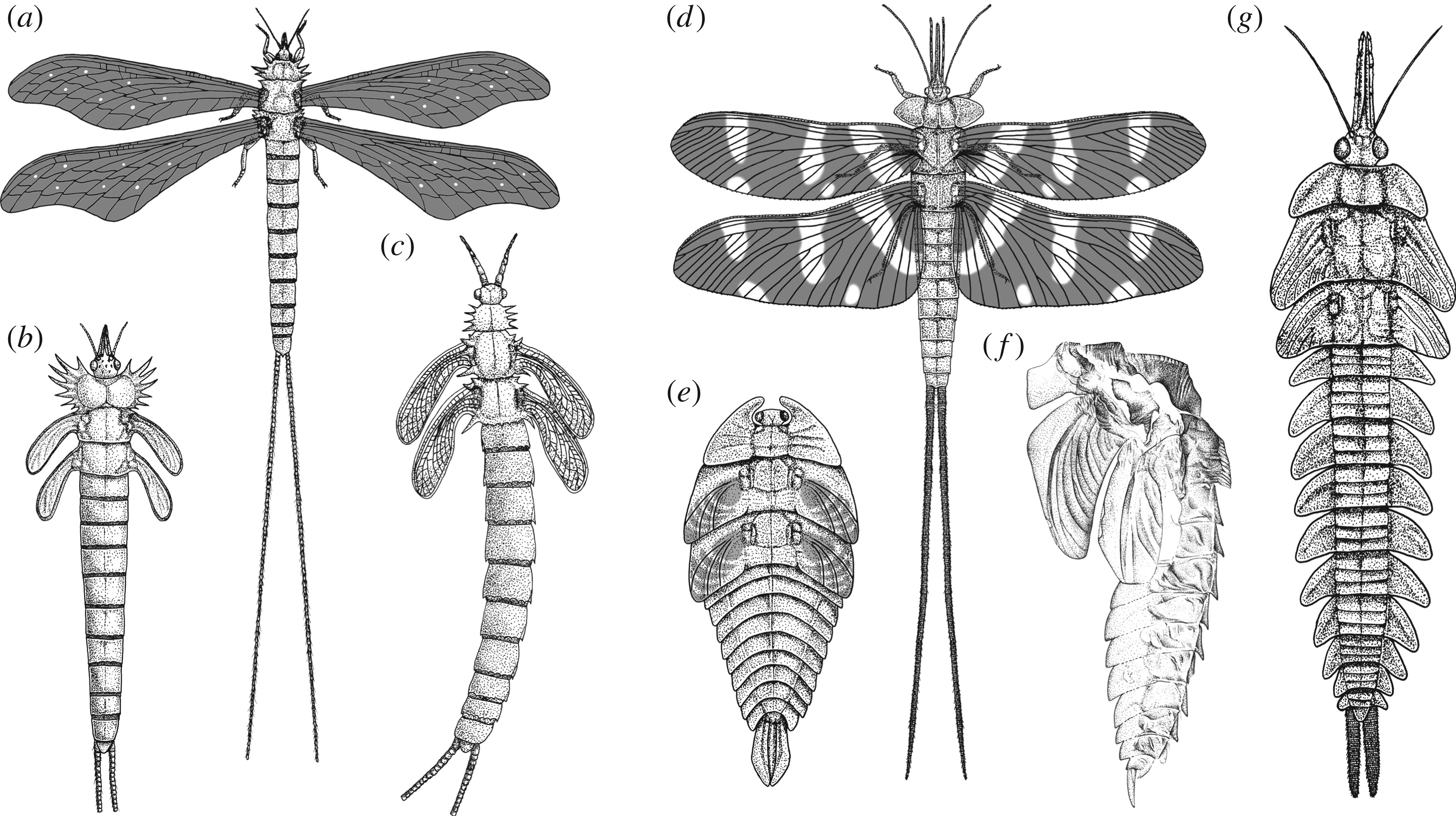
- Reconstructions of larvae and adults of Megasecoptera (a-c) and Palaeodictyoptera (d-g): a) adult Mischoptera nigra; b) early and c) older instar larvae of Mischoptera douglassi; d) adult Dunbaria fasciipennis; e) Idoptilus sp., early instar larva; f) larval exuvia of Palaeodictyoptera family indet.; g) Bizarrea obscura, larva

Scientific classification
- Kingdom: Animalia
- Phylum: Arthropoda
- Clade: Pancrustacea
- Class: Insecta
- Subclass: Pterygota
- Superorder: †Palaeodictyopterida; Bechly, 1996

Orders
- Clade †Megasecopteromorpha; Order †Diaphanopterodea; Order †Megasecoptera; Order †Palaeodictyoptera; Order †Permothemistida

= Palaeodictyopterida =

Palaeodictyopterida Temporal range: 326–252 Ma

Extinct order of insects

The Paleodictyopterida or Palaeodictyopteroidea are an extinct superorder of Palaeozoic beaked insects, characterised by unique mouthparts consisting of 5 stylets. They represent the first important terrestrial herbivores, and the first major group of herbivorous insects. They appear during the Carboniferous (Serpukhovian stage) and continue through to the Late Permian. This large and diverse group includes 50% of all known Paleozoic insects. Palaeodictyopteroidea nymphs possessed movable wing pads and appear to have been able to perform simple flapping flight.

== Phylogeny ==
An analysis by Sroka et al. (2015) recovered the following phylogenetic tree:

- Dicondylia
  - Zygentoma
  - Paranotalia
    - †Carbotriplurida
    - Pterygota
      - Neopterygota
        - †Palaeodictyopterida
          - †Spilapteridae
          - - †Thesoneuridae
            - - †Homoiopteridae
              - - †Eugereonidae
                - - †Dictyoneuridae
                  - - †Megasecoptera
                    - - †Permothemistida
                      - †Diaphanopterodea
        - Neoptera
      - Hydropalaeoptera
        - †Bojophlebiidae
        - Euhydropalaeoptera
          - Odonatoptera
          - Panephemeroptera
