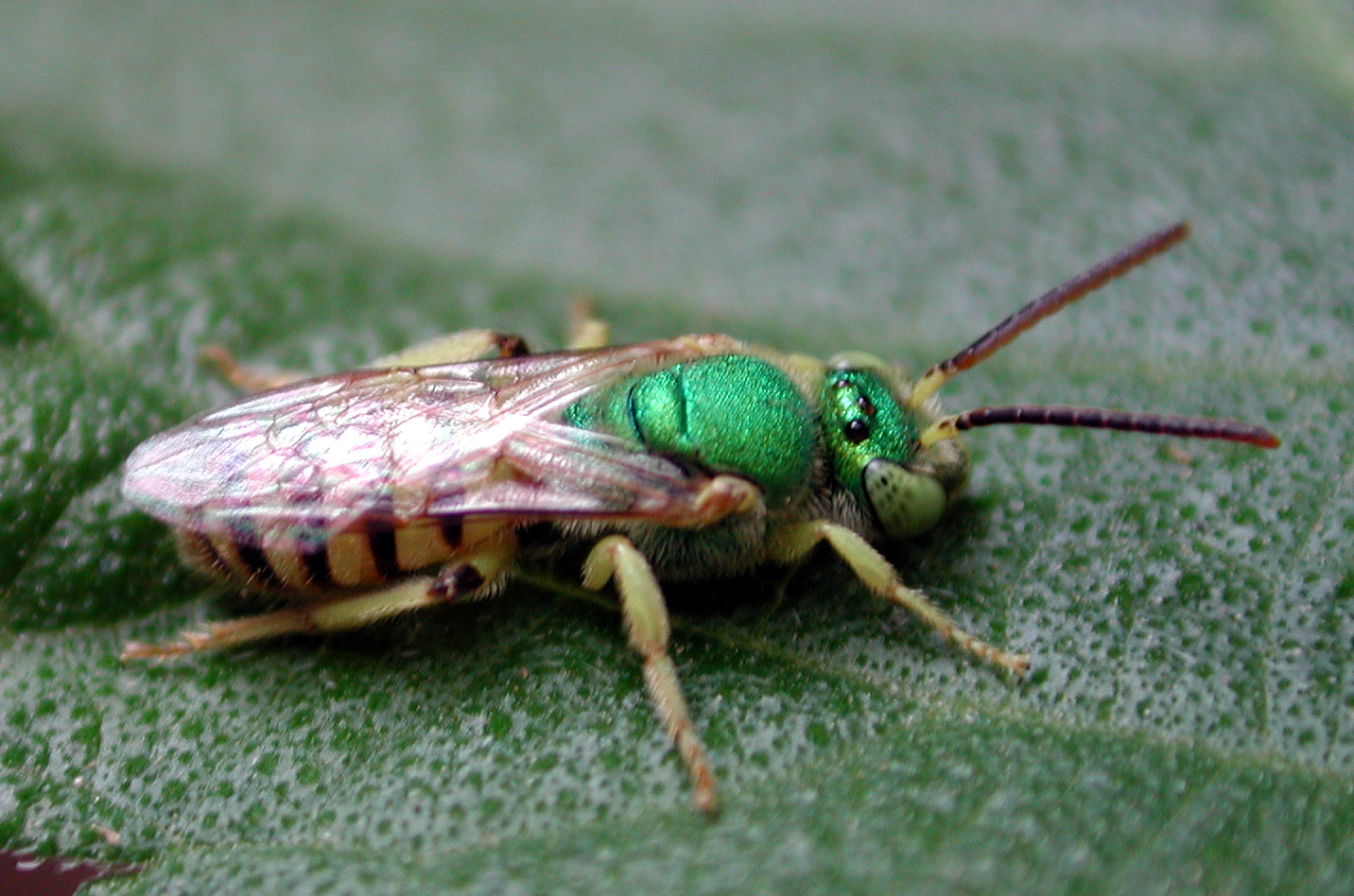
- Neopterans including bees (order Hymenoptera) can fold their wings over their abdomens.

Scientific classification
- Kingdom: Animalia
- Phylum: Arthropoda
- Clade: Pancrustacea
- Class: Insecta
- Subclass: Pterygota
- Infraclass: Neoptera; Martynov, 1923

Subgroups
- Eumetabola; Holometabola; Paraneoptera; Polyneoptera

= Neoptera =

Neoptera Temporal range: Late Carboniferous–Present

Infraclass of insects

Neoptera (Ancient Greek néos ("new") + pterón ("wing")) is a classification group that includes most orders of the winged insects, specifically those that can flex their wings over their abdomens. This is in contrast with the more basal orders of winged insects (the "Palaeoptera" assemblage), which are unable to flex their wings in this way.

== Classification ==
The taxon Neoptera was proposed by А.М. Martynov in 1923 and 1924, in the following classification:

Pterygota

- division Palaeoptera
  - order Odonata
  - order Agnatha (correct name: Ephemeroptera)
  - †order Dictyoneuridea
  - †order Megasecoptera
  - †order Meganisoptera
  - †order Protephemeroidea
- division Neoptera
  - superorder Endopterygota
    - order Coleoptera
    - order Strepsiptera
    - order Neuroptera
    - order Raphidioptera
    - order Megaloptera
    - order Diptera
    - order Mecoptera
    - order Trichoptera
    - order Lepidoptera
    - order Hymenoptera
  - subdivision Polyneoptera
    - superorder Orthopteroidea (Anartioptera)
      - order Orthoptera
      - order Plecoptera
      - order Dermaptera
      - order Embioptera
      - order Phasmatodea
    - superorder Blattopteroidea (senior name: Pandictyoptera)
      - order Blattodea
      - order Mantodea
  - subdivision Paraneoptera
    - order Hemiptera
      - suborder Auchenorrhyncha
      - suborder Coleorrhyncha
      - suborder Heteroptera
      - suborder Sternorrhyncha
  - subdivision Oligoneoptera

The order Thysanoptera originally had an uncertain systematic position, and later was attributed to Paraneoptera. Other classifications were proposed, subordinating Neoptera either directly to Pterygota (as in Martynov's classification), or to Metapterygota:

- Pterygota Gegenbaur 1878
  - Ephemeroptera Hyatt & Arms 1890
  - Metapterygota Börner 1909
    - Odonata Fabricius 1793
    - Neoptera Martynov 1923

== Phylogeny ==
The phylogeny of Neoptera is shown in the cladogram, using the molecular phylogeny of Wipfler et al. 2019 for the Polyneoptera, Johnson et al 2018 for the Paraneoptera (where Psocomorpha contains Phthiraptera), and Kjer et al 2016 for the Holometabola.

- Neoptera
  - Polyneoptera
    - - Zoraptera (angel insects)
      - Dermaptera (earwigs)
    - - Plecoptera (stoneflies)
      - - Orthoptera (grasshoppers, crickets, katydids)
        - - - - Grylloblattodea (ice crawlers)
              - Mantophasmatodea (gladiators)
            - - Phasmatodea (stick insects)
              - Embioptera (webspinners)
          - Dictyoptera
            - Mantodea (mantises)
            - Blattodea (cockroaches and termites)
  - Eumetabola
    - Paraneoptera
      - Condylognatha
        - Thysanoptera (thrips)
        - Hemiptera (true bugs)
      - Psocodea (barklice inc. lice)
    - Holometabola (Endopterygota)
      - Hymenopterida
        Hymenoptera (ants, sawflies, wasps)
      - Aparaglossata
        - Neuropteroidea
          - Neuropterida
            - Raphidioptera (snakeflies)
            - - Megaloptera (alderflies and allies)
              - Neuroptera (lacewings and allies)
          - Coleopterida
            - Coleoptera (beetles)
            - Strepsiptera (twisted-wing parasites)
        - Panorpida
          - Amphiesmenoptera
            - Trichoptera (caddisflies)
            - Lepidoptera (butterflies, moths)
          - Antliophora
            - Diptera (true flies)
            - - Mecoptera (scorpionflies)
              - Siphonaptera (fleas)
