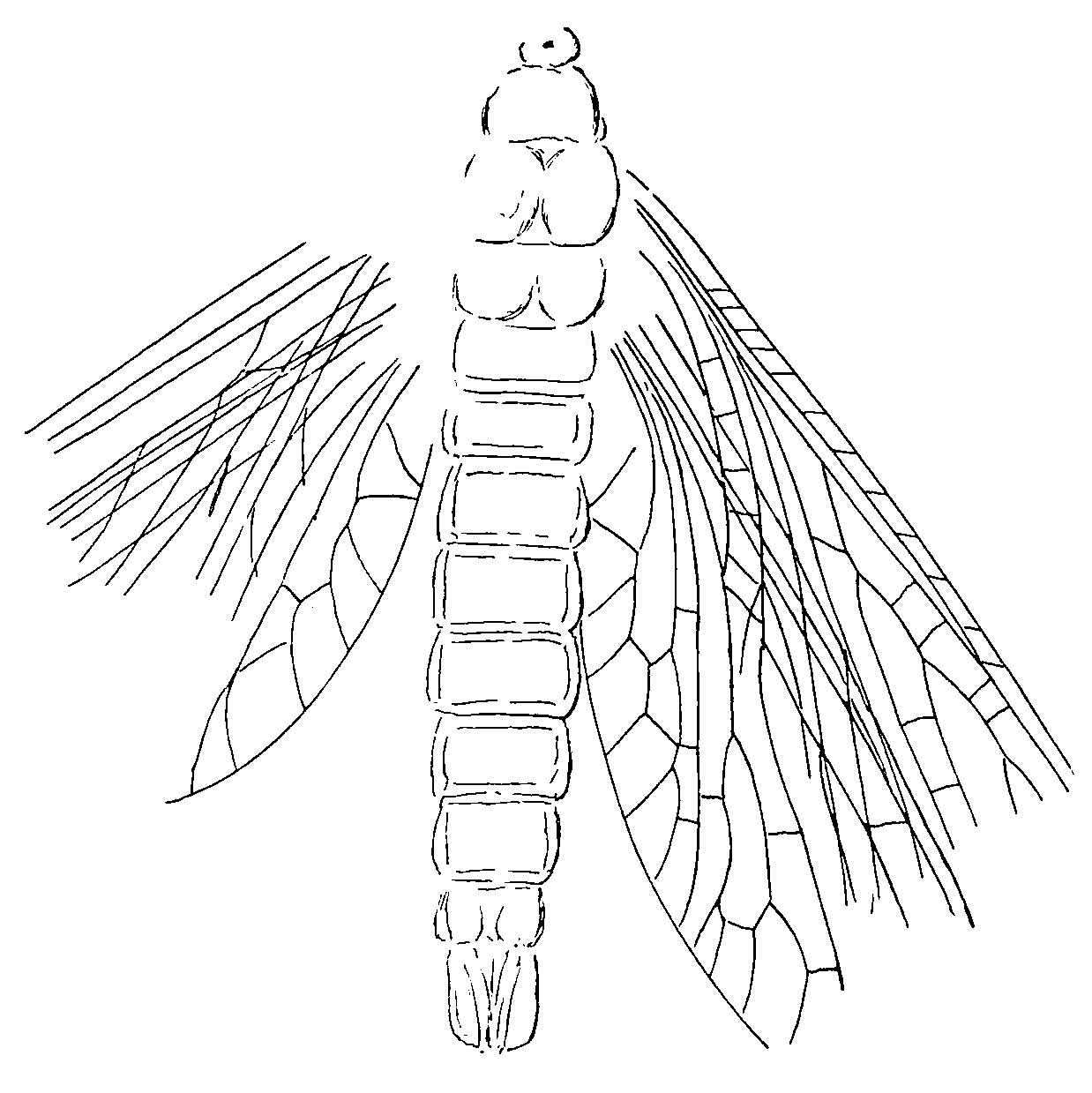
- Prochoroptera calopteryx

Scientific classification
- Domain: Eukaryota
- Kingdom: Animalia
- Phylum: Arthropoda
- Class: Insecta
- Superorder: †Palaeodictyopteroidea
- Order: †Diaphanopterodea; Handlirsch, 1919

Families
- Aenigmatidiidae Rohdendorf, 1961; Alexrasnitsyniidae Prokop & Nel, 2011; Asthenohymenidae Tillyard, 1924; Bardohymenidae Zalessky, 1937; Biarmohymenidae Zalessky, 1937; Diaphanopteridae Handlirsch, 1906; Elmoidae Tillyard, 1937; Martynoviidae Tillyard, 1932; Namurodiaphidae Kukalova-Peck & Brauckmann, 1990; Parelmoidae Rohdendorf, 1962; Prochoropteridae Handlirsch, 1911; Velisopteridae Pinto & Adami-Rodrigues, 1997

= Diaphanopterodea =

Diaphanopterodea Temporal range: Late Carboniferous to Late Permian

Extinct order of insects

The Diaphanopterodea or Paramegasecoptera are an extinct order of moderate to large-sized Palaeozoic insects. They are first known from the Middle Carboniferous (late Serpukhovian or early Bashkirian in age), and include some of the earliest known flying insects.

== Overview ==
Despite their very early appearance in the insect fossil record, they represent a specialised group of Palaeodictyopteroidea (Palaeozoic beaked insects), unique among representatives of that group in having evolved the ability to fold their wings over their thorax and abdomen in a manner similar to, but not homologous with, the Neopteran insects. The nymphs also had an unusual appearance, being covered in numerous hairlike filaments.

Diaphanopterodea are distinguished by a number of other characteristics, and are generally considered to be a monophyletic group. About ten families are known. The group died out at the end of the Permian period, victims of the End-Permian mass-extinction, without leaving any descendants.
