= Andrey Vasilyevich Martynov =

Andrey Vasilyevich Martynov (Russian: Андрей Васильевич Мартынов; 21 August 1879 – 29 January 1938) was a Russian and Soviet entomologist and palaeontologist, a founder of the Russian palaeoentomological school. Originally interested in caddisflies and crustaceans, he later turned his attention to the study of the extensive fossil insect deposits in the territory of the newly established Soviet Union (e.g. Karatau and Sayan Mountains). He was able to interpret fossil insects in terms of comparative morphology of recent species, and his description of the evolutionary relationships of the various insect orders was ahead of its time. A number of major lineages that he proposed are still accepted in current insect classification.

He was married to fellow palaeoentomologist Olga Mikhailovna Martynova. The couple had one daughter who died in infancy, and a son named Nikolai who became an engineer.
