= List of largest insects =

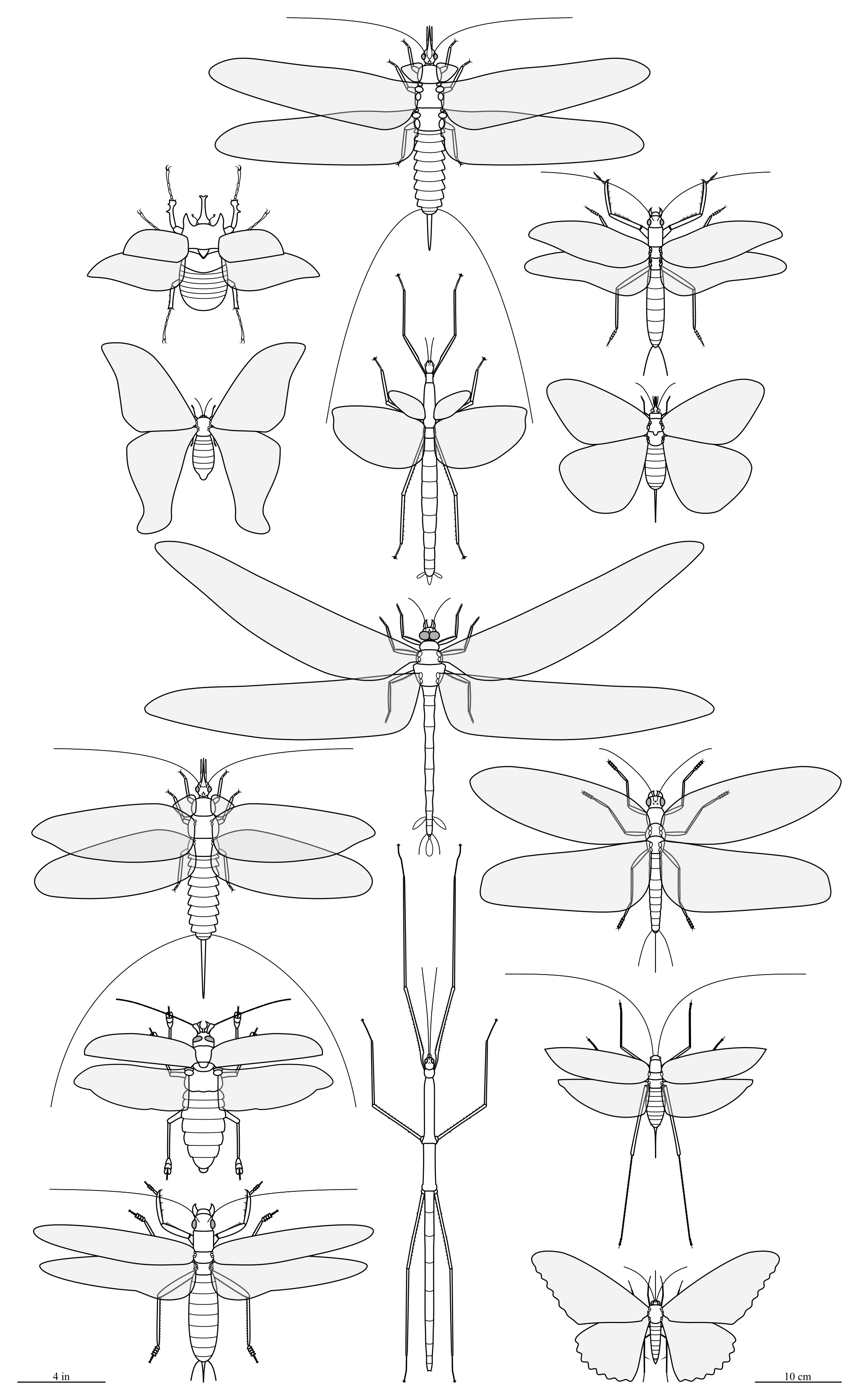
Graphic showing the largest living and extinct insects, from top to bottom, left column: actaeon beetle, Coscinocera hercules, Homoioptera gigantea, titan beetle and Gigatitan similis, central column: Mazothairos enormis, Eurycnema versirubra, Meganeuropsis permiana and Phryganistria sp., right column: Clatrotitan scullyi, Kalligramma haeckeli, Bojophlebia prokopi, Arachnacris tenuipes and Thysania agrippina

Insects, which are a type of arthropod, are the most numerous group of multicellular organisms on the planet, with over a million species identified so far. The title of heaviest insect in the world has many contenders, the most frequently crowned of which is the larval stage of the goliath beetle, Goliathus goliatus, the maximum size of which is at least 115 g (4.1 oz) and 11.5 cm (4.5 in). The highest confirmed weight of an adult insect is 71 g (2.5 oz) for a gravid female giant wētā, Deinacrida heteracantha, although it is likely that one of the elephant beetles, Megasoma elephas and Megasoma actaeon, or goliath beetles, both of which can commonly exceed 50 g (1.8 oz) and 10 cm (3.9 in), can reach a greater weight.

The longest insects are the stick insects, see below.

Representatives of the extinct dragonfly-like order Meganisoptera (also known as griffenflies) such as the Carboniferous Meganeura monyi and the Permian Meganeuropsis permiana are the largest insect species ever known. These creatures had a wingspan of some 71 cm (28 in). Their maximum body mass is uncertain, with estimates varying between 34 g and 210 g.

== Dragonflies and damselflies (Odonata) ==
The largest wingspan of any living species of odonate (the order that includes dragonflies and damselflies) belongs to Megaloprepus caerulatus, reaching 19 centimeters (7.5 inches) in wingspan. Petalura ingentissima has the largest wingspan of any dragonfly at 165 mm (6.5 in), although Tetracanthagyna plagiata comes in with a close second of 163 mm (6.4 in).

The largest wing surface area of any living species of odonate belongs to Chlorogomphus papilio, a dragonfly.

The longest body length of any living species of odonate belongs to Mecistogaster lucretia with a body length of 155 mm (6.1 in).

The heaviest living species of odonate is probably either Petalura ingentissima or Tetracanthagyna plagiata. However, other species such as Anax strenuus and Anotogaster sieboldii and other species in Petalura, Tetracanthagyna, Anax and Anotogaster could also be contenders.

See also the extinct genera Meganeuropsis and Meganeura, although they are not certain to be included in the modern dragonfly order.

== Mayflies (Ephemeroptera) ==
The largest mayflies are members of the genus Proboscidoplocia from Madagascar. These insects can reach a length of 5 cm (2.0 in).

== Palaeodictyoptera (extinct) ==
The largest insect of the order Palaeodictyoptera, Mazothairos enormis from the Carboniferous period, with estimated wingspan about 56 cm (22 in).

== Grasshoppers, crickets, and relatives (Orthoptera) ==
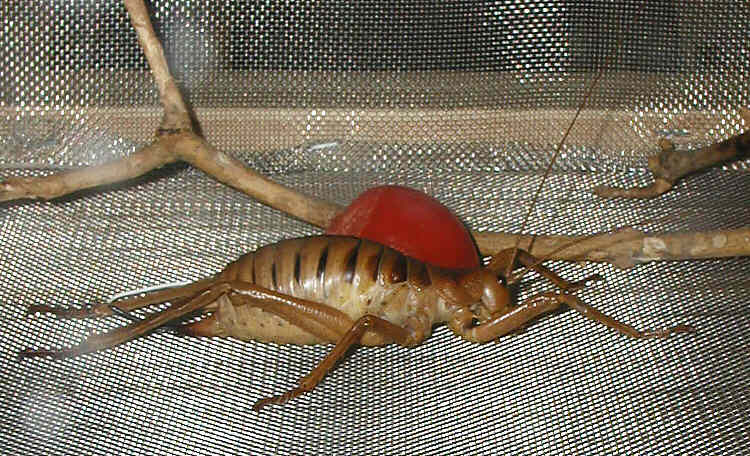
Giant wētā

The order Orthoptera contains two suborders (Caelifera and Ensifera), with four infraorders (Gryllidea, Tettigoniidea, Tridactylidea, and Acrididea) and multiple different families within them both.

The heaviest of this widespread, varied complex of insects is the Little Barrier Island giant wētā, Deinacrida heteracantha, of New Zealand; one specimen weighed 71 g (2.5 oz) and measured nearly 10 cm (3.9 in), giving it one of the largest insect weights ever known. These heavyweight insects can be over 9 cm (3.5 in) long.

The largest (heaviest) macropredatory (animal that will eat prey of a similar size or larger than itself) Orthopteran is Sia ferox (also known as "Riokku" (リオック) or the "Giant Raspy Cricket"), from the family Stenopelmatidae (suborder Ensifera). It can measure more than 9 cm (3.5 in) and weigh more than 35 g (1.2 oz). Other species of macropredatory Orthoptera can get almost as large: Sia incisa, Anostostoma australasiae and Motuweta isolata (all from the superfamily Stenopelmatoidea). The giant predatory katydids (family Tettigoniidae) of the genus Saga aren't quite as robust.

The heaviest katydids (family Tettigoniidae) are the members of the genus Panoploscelis (The "spiny lobster katydids"). The largest species within the genus Saga are almost as heavy.

The katydid (family Tettigoniidae) Pseudophyllanax imperialis has the largest wingspan of any Orthoptera, at more than 26 cm (10 in). Other genera of Orthoptera can have wingspans almost as large (over 25 cm (9.8 in)): Arachnacris, Siliquofera, Pseudophyllus, Tropidacris and Titanacris.

The heaviest species of grasshopper (nanorder Acridomorpha) are the females of the endangered giant bladder grasshopper; Physophorina livingstoni.

The subspecies Tropidacris cristata dux has the largest wingspan of any grasshopper (nanorder Acridomorpha): at 25 cm (9.8 in). Other species of Tropidacris and the closely related genus Titanacris can have wingspans almost as large.

The grasshopper Proscopia gigantea has the largest body length of any grasshopper (nanorder Acridomorpha) and of any Orthopteran at over 18 cm (7.1 in). Other species of Proscopia and the closely related genus Pseudoproscopia (all from the family Proscopiidae) can reach lengths almost as large (over 17 cm (6.7 in)).

The largest species of true cricket (Grylloidea) are the members of the genus Brachytrupes, which can reach a lengths of up to 7.5 cm (3.0 in).

=== Titanopterans (Titanoptera) (extinct) ===
Related to modern orthopterans, Triassic insects of the extinct suborder of Titanoptera surpassed them in size. The wingspan of Gigatitan vulgaris was as large as of 40 centimetres (16 in). Clatrotitan andersoni also reached a huge size, having a forewing of 13.8 centimetres (5.4 in) long.

== Earwigs (Dermaptera) ==
The largest of the earwigs is the Saint Helena earwig (Labidura herculeana), which is up to 8.4 cm (3.3 in) in length. There are no recent records of this species and it is generally considered extinct. The largest certainly living species is the Australian giant earwig (Titanolabis colossea), which is about 5 cm (2.0 in) long.

== Scorpionflies (Mecoptera) ==
The largest scorpionfly, the common scorpionfly (Panorpa communis), can reach a body length of about 30 mm (1.2 in).

== Stick insects (Phasmatodea) ==
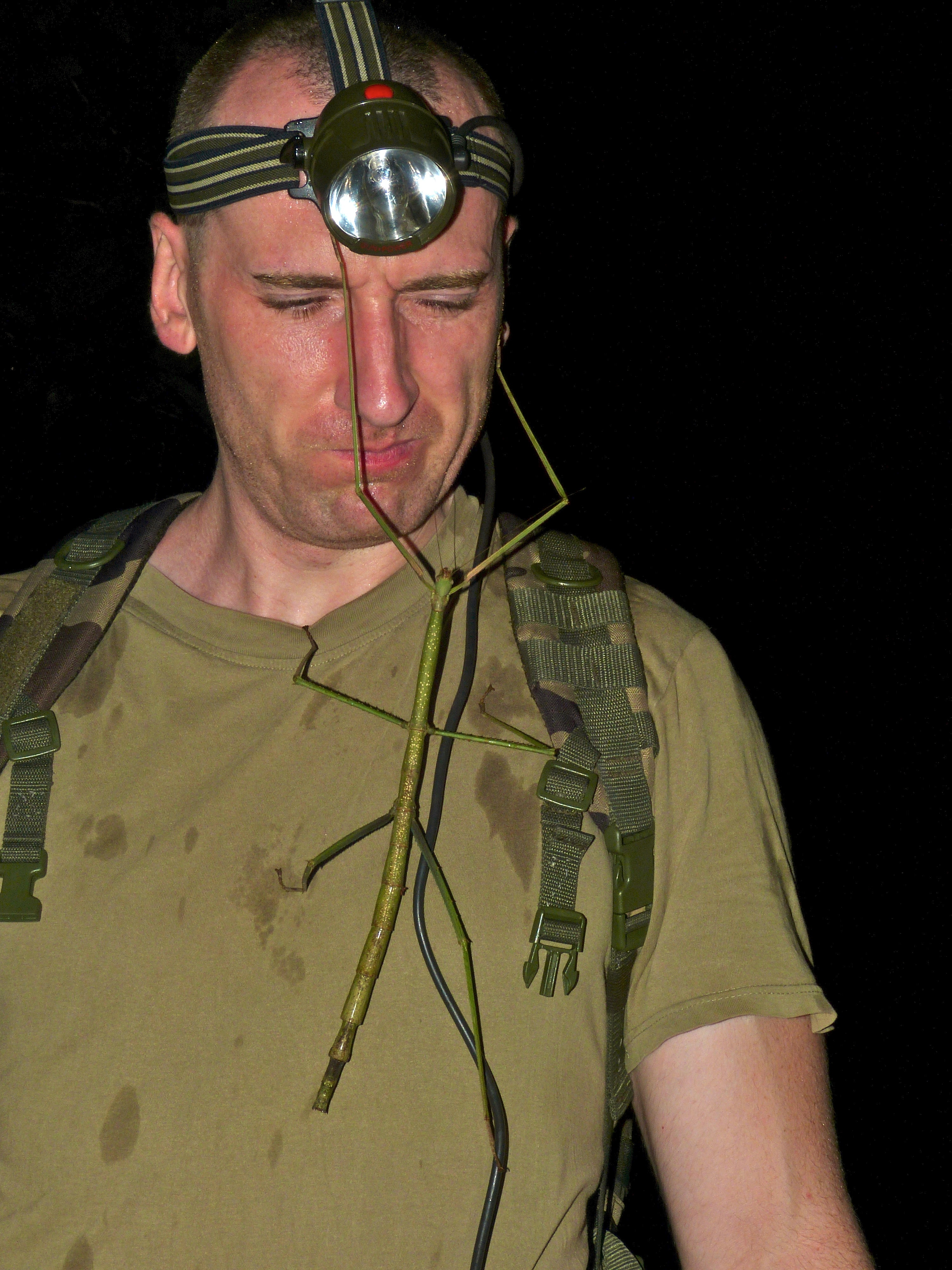
Phobaeticus serratipes, one of the longest stick insects

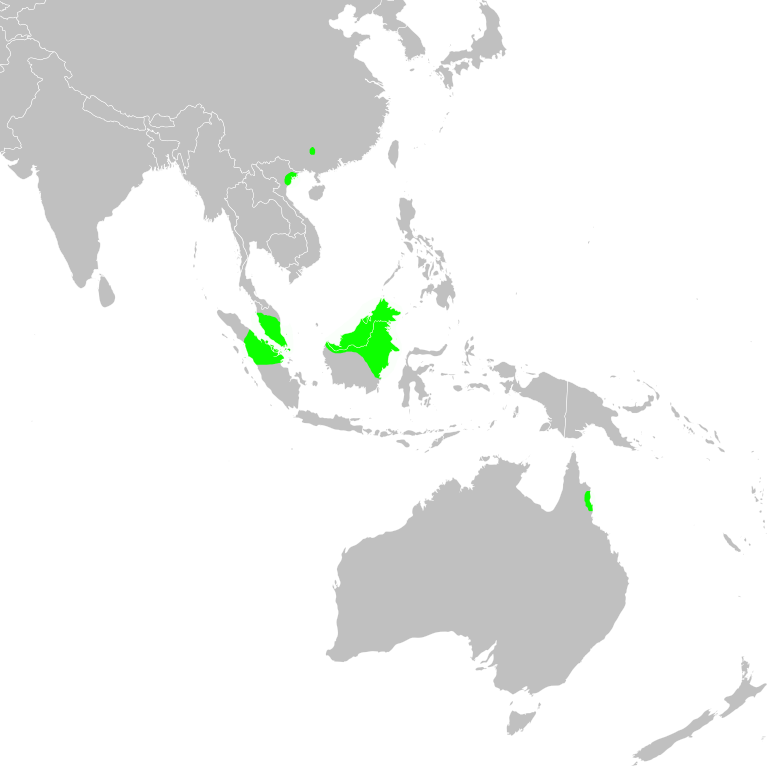
Distributions of stick insect species known to exceed 50 cm (20 in) in total length

The longest known stick insects are also the longest known insects, notably species in the tribe Pharnaciini, but they are generally relatively lightweight because of their slender shape. Female of these stick insects usually reach considerably larger sizes than males of the same species. The longest known is a currently undescribed species of Phryganistria, informally referred to as Phryganistria "chinensis", that was discovered in China in 2014. A wild collected female kept at the Insect Museum of West China in Chengdu was the record holder with a total length, including extended legs, of 62.4 cm (24.6 in), and a body length of 36.1 cm (14.2 in), but it was surpassed by one of its captive bred young that reached 64 cm (25 in) in total length.

Other very large species, formerly believed to be longest but now considered second longest is Phobaeticus chani; a specimen held in the Natural History Museum in London is 56.7 cm (22.3 in) in total length, including extended legs, and it has a body length of 35.7 cm (14.1 in). Females of the Australian Ctenomorpha gargantua have been confirmed at up to 56.5 cm (22.2 in) in total length (including extended legs and cerci, the latter of which are unusually long in this species); one captive individual was measured at 61.5 cm (24.2 in), but that size remains unconfirmed. Another very large species is Phobaeticus kirbyi where the total length (including extended legs) is up to 54.6 cm (21.5 in) and the body alone up to 32.8 cm (12.9 in). Another of the longest insect in terms of total length is Phobaeticus serratipes of Malaysia and Singapore, measuring up to 55.5 cm (21.9 in) in total length.

The spiny stick insect (Heteropteryx dilatata) of Southeast Asia does not reach the extreme lengths of its cousins, the body reaching up to 16 cm (6.3 in) long, but it is much bulkier. The largest Heteropteryx weighed about 65 g (2.3 oz) and was 3.5 cm (1.4 in) wide across the thickest part of the body.

== Cockroaches and termites (Blattodea) ==
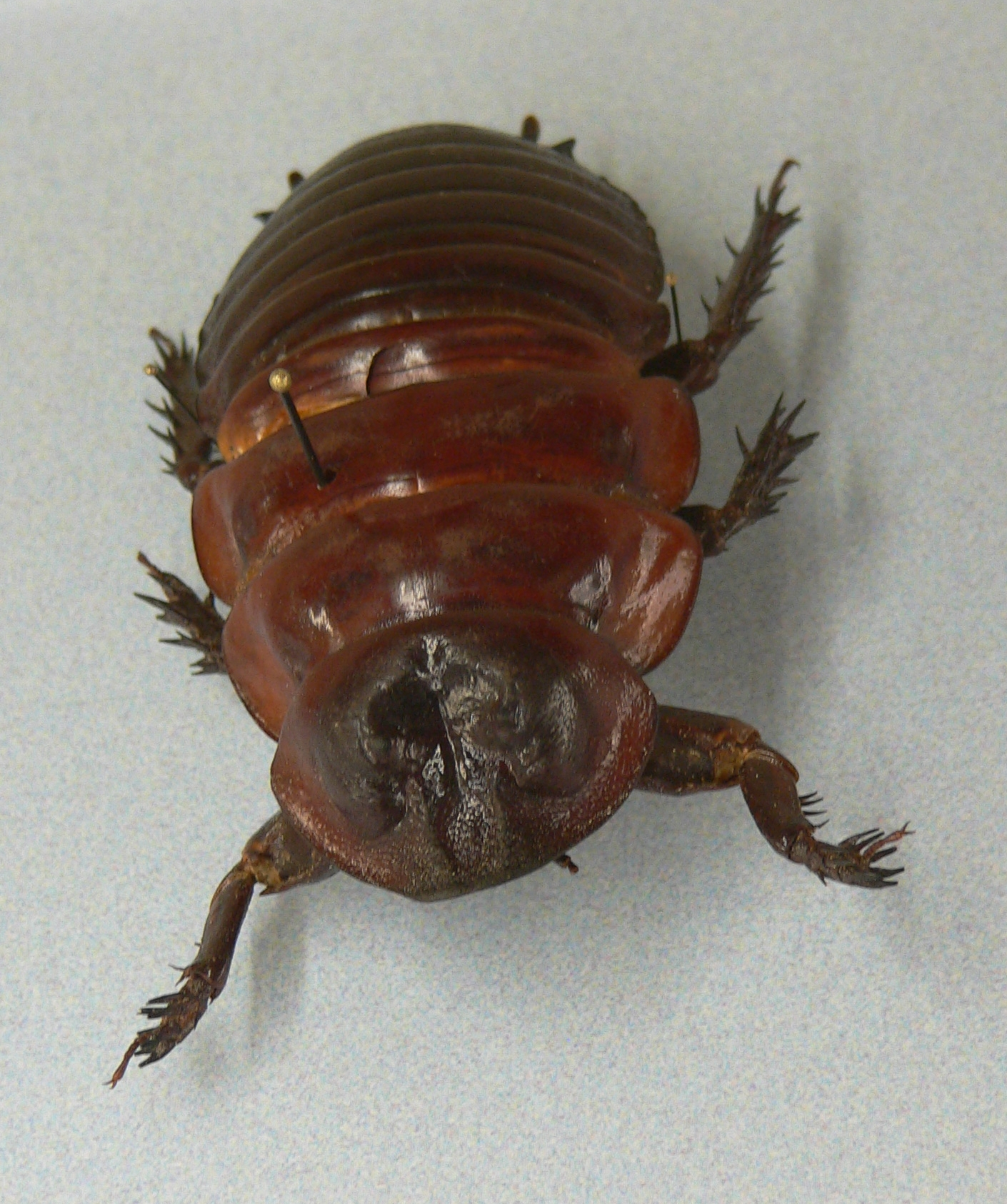
Giant burrowing cockroach

The largest cockroach in length and wingspan is the South American Megaloblatta longipennis, at up to 9.7 cm (3.8 in) and 18–20 cm (7.1–7.9 in), respectively. Other contenders for longest are Blaberus giganteus, which is found in the same general region and may reach a length of up to 9 or 10 cm (3.5 or 3.9 in), depending on source, and Princisia vanwaerebeki of Madagascar, which grows between 5.6 and 10 cm in length. The heaviest is the Australian giant burrowing cockroach (Macropanesthia rhinoceros), which can attain a length of 8.4 cm (3.3 in) and a weight of 33.5 g (1.18 oz).

=== Termites ===
The largest of the termites is the African species Macrotermes bellicosus. The queen of this species can attain a length of 10.6 cm (4.2 in) and breadth of 5.5 cm (2.2 in); other adults, however, are about a third of this size.

== Praying mantises (Mantodea) ==
The giant stick mantises Toxodera maxima and Ischnomantis gigas can reach lengths of over 17 cm, but are more gracile in build than other large mantises. Other species of Toxodera and Ischnomantis, and other genera of “stick mantises” (Heterochaeta, Solygia and Tauromantis), can attain lengths almost as large (over 16 cm).

Mantises of the tribe Hierodulini (of which Rhombodera fratricida is the largest known to science) can reach lengths of nearly 13 cm (5.1 in) and are more robust than comparably sized mantises of other genera (Tenodera, Macromantis, Idolomantis, Sphodromantis, Deroplatys, Plistospilota and Stagmatoptera). Some larger species have been known to capture and consume frogs, lizards, mice, small birds, small fish and even small snakes.

== True bugs (Hemiptera) ==
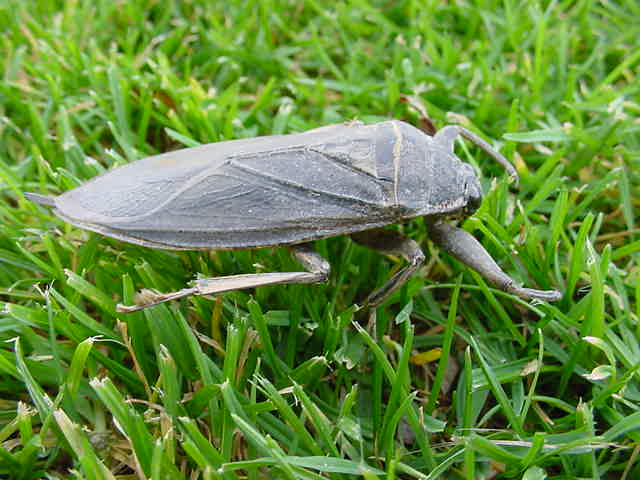
Giant water bug walking over land

The heaviest species of this order are the giant water bugs Lethocerus grandis and Lethocerus maximus. These can surpass a length of 12 cm (4.7 in), although they are more slender and less heavy than most other insects of this size (principally the huge beetles).

The largest wingspan of any hemipteran belongs to the largest species of cicada: Megapomponia imperatoria, which has a head-body length of about 7 cm (2.8 in) and a wingspan of 18–20 cm (7–8 in). The cicadas of the genus Tacua can also grow to comparably large sizes.

The largest total length of any hemipteran belongs to Gigantometra gigas (the largest species of water strider), which has a leg span of more than 25 cm (9.8 in).

The largest type of aphid is the giant oak aphid (Stomaphis quercus), which can reach an overall length of 2 cm (0.79 in). The biggest species of leafhopper is Ledromorpha planirostris, which can reach a length of 2.8 cm (1.1 in).

== Dobsonflies and relatives (Megaloptera) ==
Megaloptera includes dobsonflies, alderflies and relatives. The largest is the dobsonfly Acanthacorydalis fruhstorferi, which can have a wingspan of up to 21.6 cm (8.5 in), making it the largest aquatic insect in the world by this measurement. This species is native to China and Vietnam, and its body can be up to 10.5 cm (4.1 in) long.

== Net-winged insects (Neuroptera) ==
The largest Neuropteran is the Giant West African Antlion, Lachlathetes gigas, which has a wingspan of 177 millimetres (7.0 in). Some forms of this ancient order could grow extremely large during the Jurassic period and may have ranked among the largest insects ever. Found in the Early Cretaceous sedimentary rocks, Makarkinia adamsi had wings nearly 140–160 mm (5.5–6.3 in) in length.

== Lice (Psocodea) ==
The largest of this order of very small insects is a barklouse of the genus Psocus, the maximum size of which is about 1 cm (0.39 in).

Parasitic lice are insects within the infraorder Phthiraptera. The largest known species is the hog louse, Haematopinus suis, a sucking louse that lives on large livestock like pigs and cattle. It can range up to 6 mm (0.24 in) in length.

== Stoneflies (Plecoptera) ==
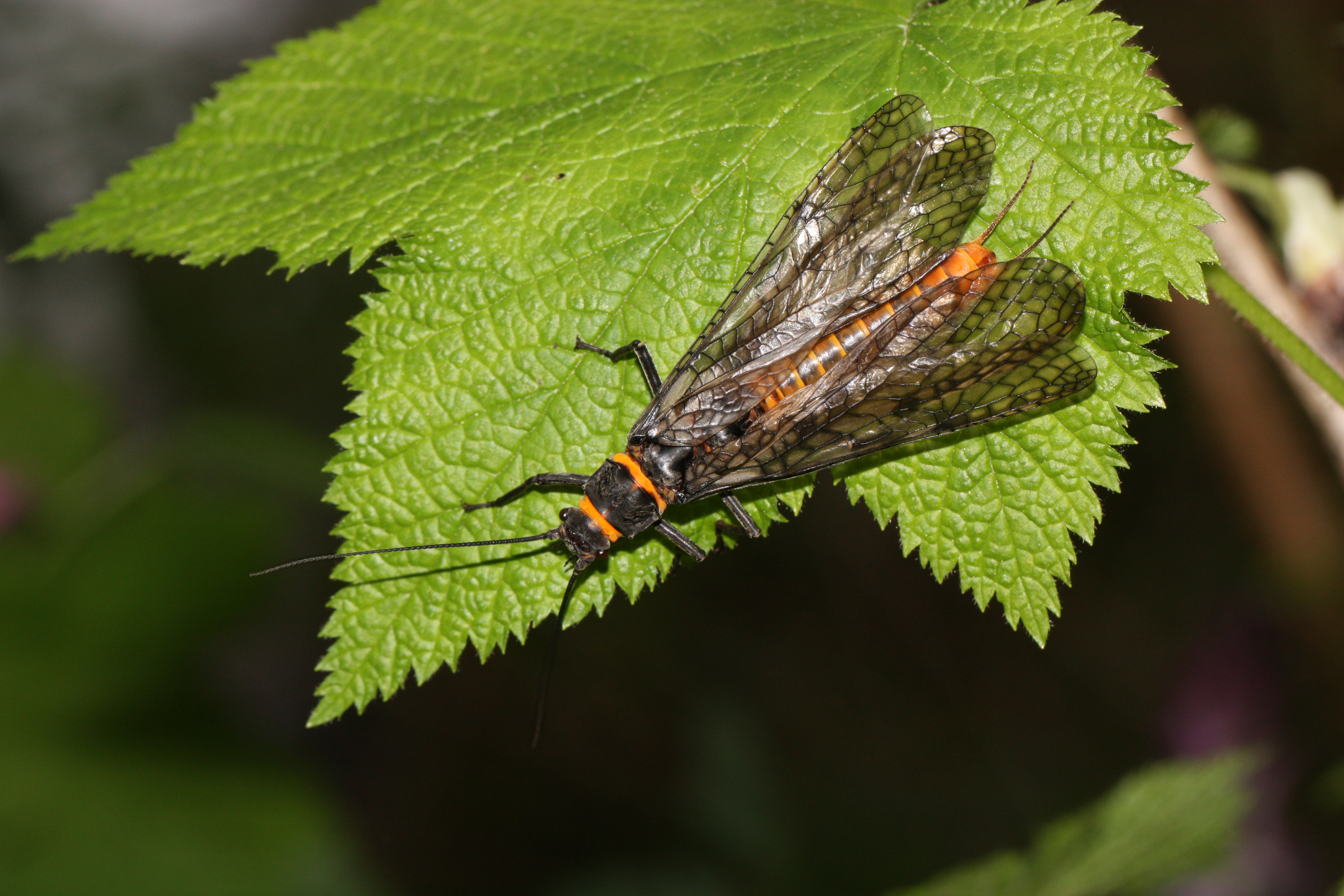
Pteronarcys californica

The largest species of stonefly is Pteronarcys californica of western North America, a species favored by fishermen as lures. This species can attain a length of 5 cm (2.0 in) and a wingspan of over 8 cm (3.1 in).

== Beetles (Coleoptera) ==
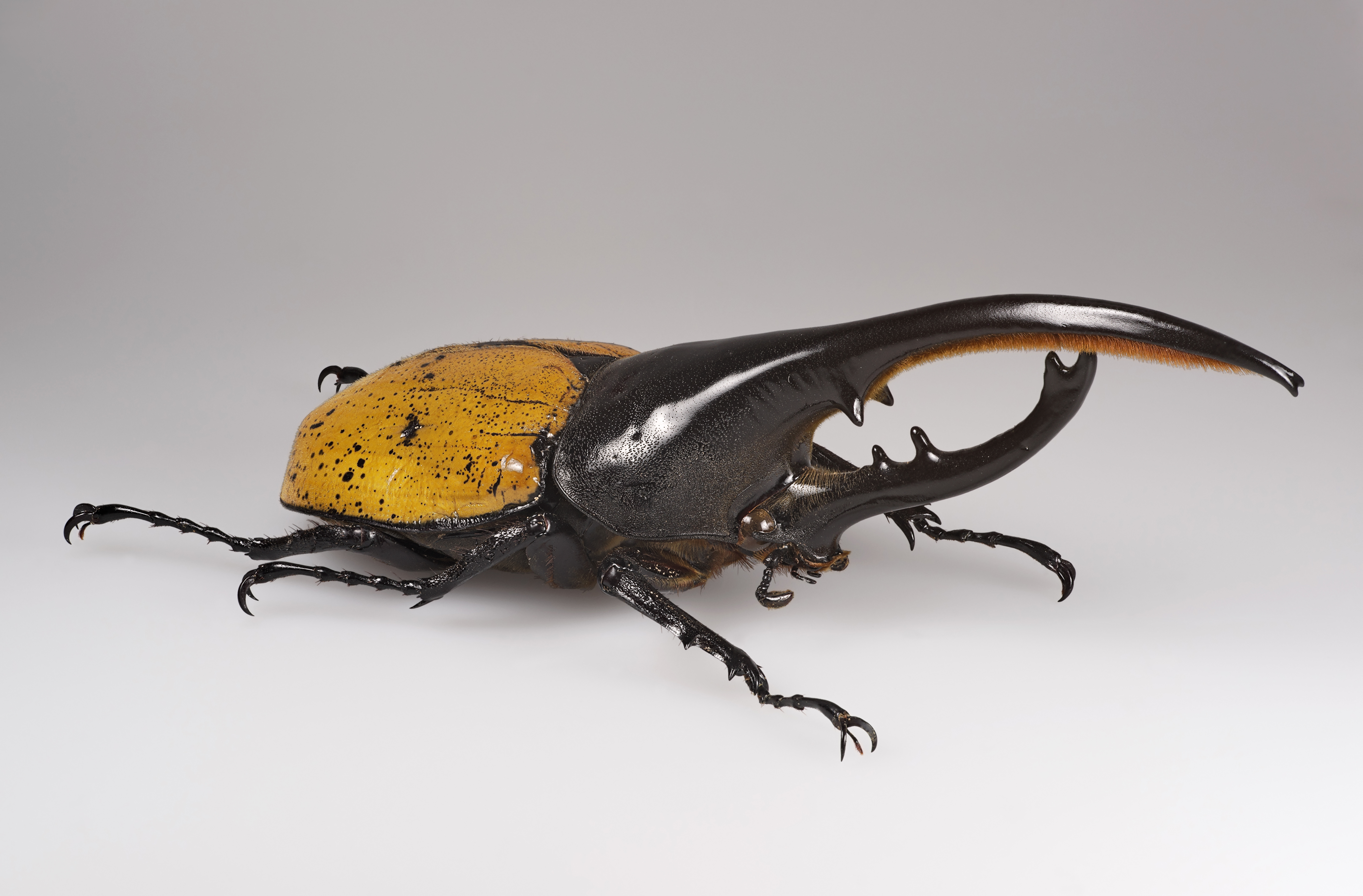
The hercules beetle, the world's longest beetle

Beetles constitute the most diverse order of organisms on earth, with about 400,000 species identified to this day. The most massive of them belong to the genera Goliathus, Megasoma, Chalcosoma, Titanus, Macrodontia, and Xixuthrus. The longest is the Hercules beetle, Dynastes hercules, with a maximum overall length of at least 18.1 cm (7.1 in) including the very long pronotal horn. The longest overall beetle is a species of longhorn beetle, Batocera wallacei, from New Guinea, which can attain a length of 26.6 cm (10.5 in), about 19 cm (7.5 in) of which is comprised by the long antennae.

== Gladiators and ice crawlers (Notoptera) ==
The largest known species of mantophasmid (also known as gladiators) and by extension the largest known Notopteran, is Tyrannophasma gladiator, measuring up to 3.2 cm (1.3 in) in length.

The largest ice crawler species, Grylloblatta campodeiformis, is 3 cm (1.2 in) long, excluding ovipositors and cerci, and are fairly elongate, wingless insects. They are a uniform honey-yellow in colour and covered with very short hair. Unlike some other species of grylloblatid, G. campodeiformis has eyes which have roughly 70 facets. The head is fairly flat and rounded. The thorax is elongate and over a third of the body length. The abdomen is composed of 10 segments and over half the body length. The legs are long and narrow (cursorial) with stout coxae and long femora. Their antennae are long ~9 mm (0.35 in) and thread-like. In adults, the number of antennal subsegments is variable, ranging from 24 to 27.

== Ants, bees, and wasps (Hymenoptera) ==
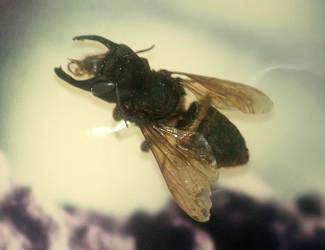
Megachile pluto, the largest bee.

The largest of ants, and the heaviest species of the family, are the queens of Dorylus helvolus, reaching a length of 5 cm (2.0 in).

The largest (heaviest) non-queen ants are the soldiers of the giant carpenter ant Dinomyrmex gigas.

The largest (heaviest) worker ants and the ant that averages the largest for the mean size of the whole colony is Dinoponera gigantea, averaging up to 3.3 cm (1 1/4 in). Other species of Dinoponera are almost as large.

The largest species of bull ant, Myrmecia brevinoda, has the longest worker ants in the world; reaching lengths of 3.7 cm (1.5 in). However, they aren't quite as robust as Dinomyrmex gigas and Dinoponera gigantea. Queens are more than 4 cm (1.6 in) in length.

The largest of the bees is Megachile pluto, the females of which can be 3.8 cm (1 1/2 in) long, with a 6.3-cm (2.5-in) wingspan.

The largest wingspan of any wasp (and of any hymenopteran) belongs to the so-called tarantula hawk species Pepsis heros, measuring up to 12.2 cm (4.8 in) in wingspan, although other species of Pepsis and the closely related Hemipepsis can approach similar sizes, and other species of wasp can probably attain greater weights.

The heaviest wasp (and heaviest hymenopteran) is probably the giant scoliid wasp Megascolia procer, it can reach a body length of over 7.7 cm (3.0 in) and have a wingspan of 11.6 cm (4.6 in).

The largest known social wasps are the queens of the Asian giant hornet (Vespa mandarinia). They can have a body length exceeding 6 cm (2.4 in) and a 9.3 cm (3.7 in) wingspan.

== Butterflies and moths (Lepidoptera) ==
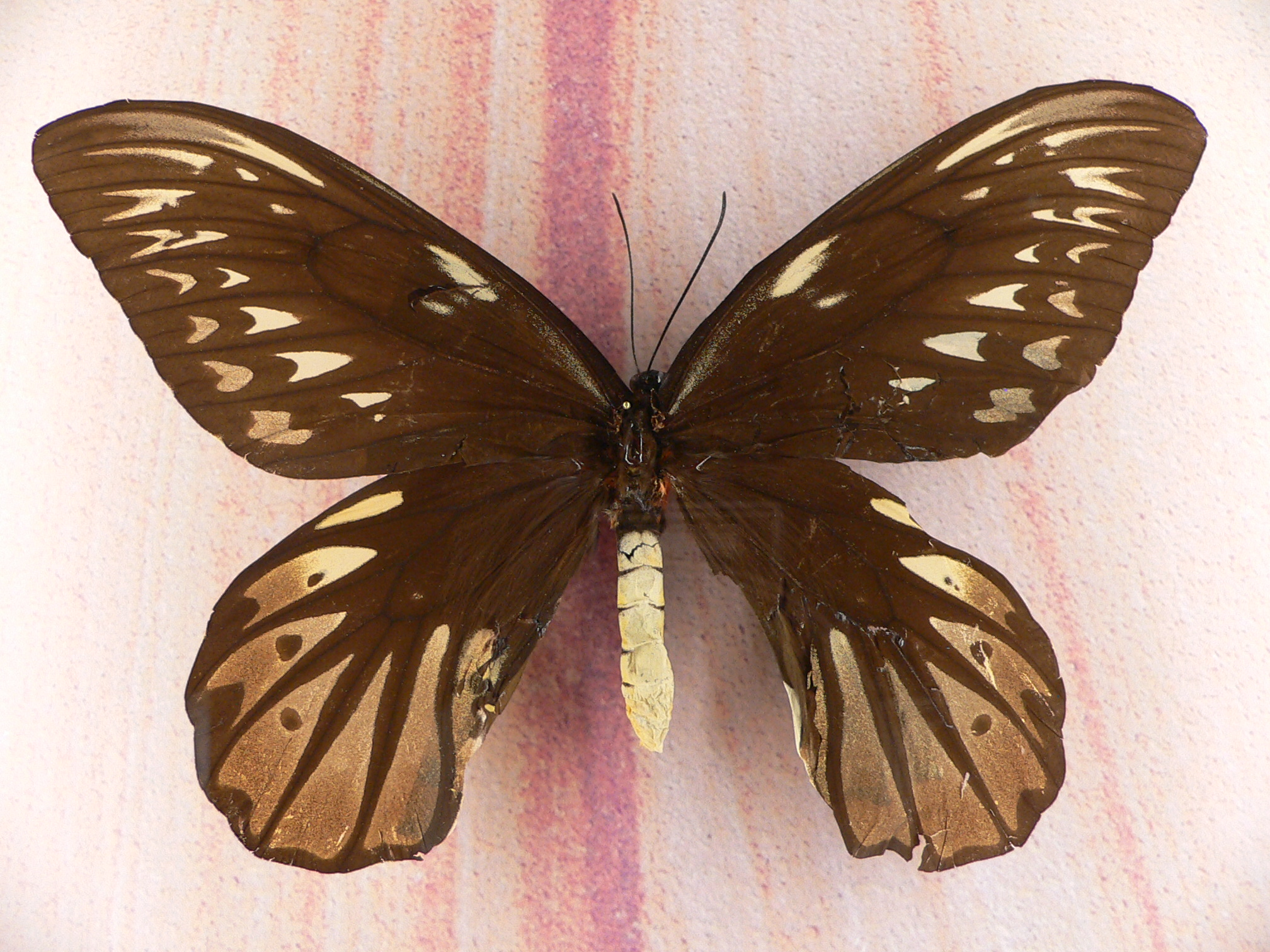
The Queen Alexandra's birdwing is the largest species of butterfly.

The largest lepidopteran species overall is often claimed to be either the Queen Alexandra's birdwing (Ornithoptera alexandrae), a butterfly from Papua New Guinea, or the Atlas moth (Attacus atlas), a moth from Southeast Asia. Both of these species can reach a body length of 8 cm (3.1 in), a wingspan of 28 cm (11 in) and a weight of 12 g (0.42 oz). One Atlas moth allegedly had a wingspan of 30 cm (12 in) but this measurement was not verified. The larvae of these two species can weigh up to 58 and 54 g (2.0 and 1.9 oz), respectively.

However, the white witch of Central and South America, Thysania agrippina, has the widest recorded wingspan of the order, and indeed of any living insect, at up to 30 cm (12 in). The verified record-sized Thysania spanned 30.8 cm (12.1 in) across the wings, although specimens have been reported to 36 cm (14 in).

The largest lepidopteran species in terms of adult body mass is the giant wood moth Endoxyla cinereus from Australia and New Zealand. Despite having a smaller wingspan than the other species, it has a mass of about 30 g (1.1 oz) and outweighs them all.

The Hercules moth (Coscinocera hercules), in the family Saturniidae, is endemic to New Guinea and northern Australia, and its wings have the largest documented surface area (300 square centimeters) of any living insect, and a maximum wingspan which is confirmed to 28 cm (11 in) while unconfirmed specimens have spanned up to 35.5 cm (14.0 in).

== True flies (Diptera) ==
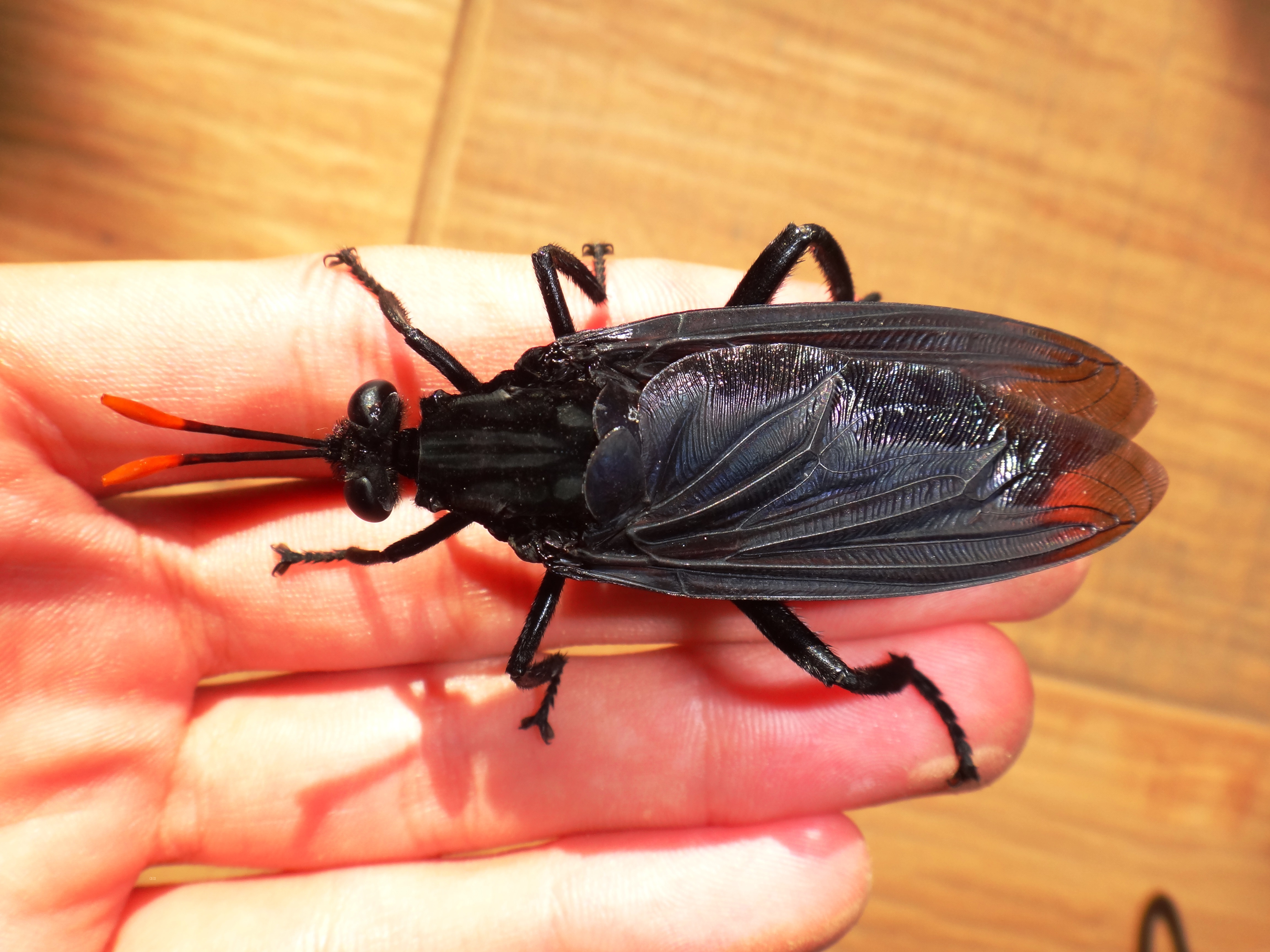
Gauromydas heros, one of the world's largest true flies.

The largest total length of any fly belongs to the largest species of crane fly: Holorusia clavipes. If the legs are extended in front of and behind the body, then an overall length of 25.8 cm (10.2 in) makes it the longest true fly. It also probably has the largest wingspan of any Diptera at over 11 cm (4.3 in).

Gauromydas heros (which can reach a wingspan of 10 cm (3.9 in) and a body length of 7 cm (2.8 in)) has the largest wing surface area of any Diptera. It might also have the longest body length of any fly at 7 cm (2.8 in) (although it is rivaled by Microstylum magnum and Phellus piliferus for this title).

The heaviest flies are the timber flies from the genus Pantophthalmus (with Pantophthalmus bellardi being the largest species of this genus known). The largest members of Asilidae (Microstylum, Phellus and Blepharotes) are almost as bulky.

== Fleas (Siphonaptera) ==
The largest species of flea is Hystrichopsylla schefferi. This parasite, known exclusively from the fur of the mountain beaver, can reach a length of 1.2 cm (0.47 in).

== Thrips (Thysanoptera) ==
Members of the genus Phasmothrips are the largest thrips. The maximum size of these species is about 1.3 cm (0.51 in).

== Caddisflies (Trichoptera) ==
The largest of the small, moth-like caddisflies is Eubasilissa maclachlani. This species can range up to 7 cm (2.8 in) across the wings.

== Silverfishes and allies (Zygentoma) ==
These insects, known to feed on human household objects, are up to 1.5 cm (0.59 in) in length. The largest is the extinct Ramsdelepidion schusteri, which reached 6 cm (2.4 in) long.

== Angel insects (Zoraptera) ==
The largest angel insect species, Hubbard's angel insect (Zorotypus hubbardi), grows up to 3 mm (0.12 in) in length.

== See also ==
- Largest prehistoric animals
