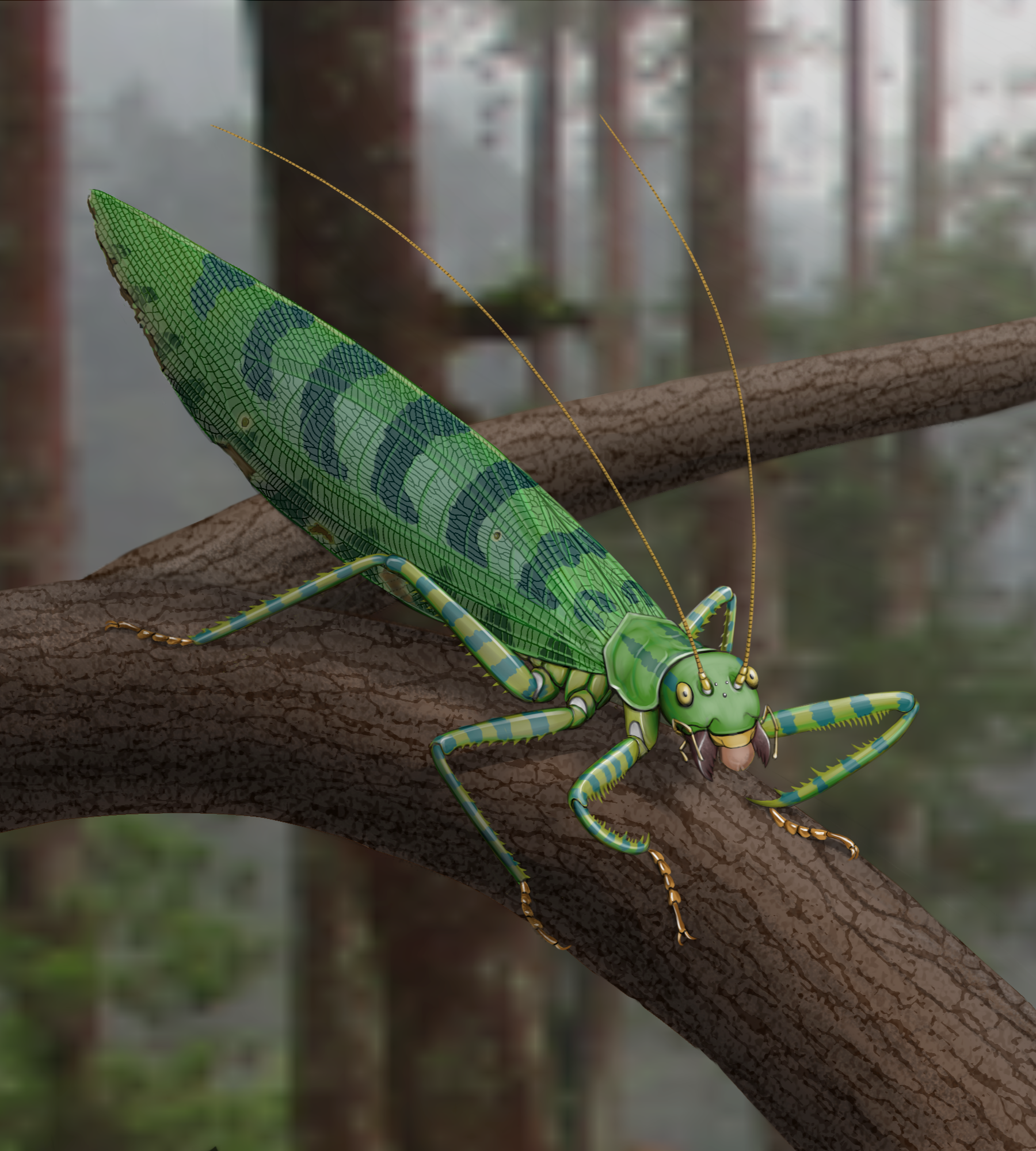
- Reconstruction of Gigatitan

Scientific classification
- Kingdom: Animalia
- Phylum: Arthropoda
- Clade: Pancrustacea
- Class: Insecta
- Cohort: Polyneoptera
- Clade: Archaeorthoptera
- Order: †Titanoptera; Sharov, 1968

Families
- See text

= Titanoptera =

Titanoptera Temporal range: Carboniferous, Middle Pennsylvanian (Moscovian)–Late Triassic (Norian)

Extinct order of insects

Titanoptera (from Ancient Greek Τιτάν (Titán), meaning "Titan", and πτερόν (pterón), meaning "wing") is an extinct order of neopteran insects from late Carboniferous to Triassic periods. Titanopterans were very large in comparison with modern insects, some having wingspans of up to 36 centimetres (14 in) or even 40 centimetres (16 in).

== Description ==
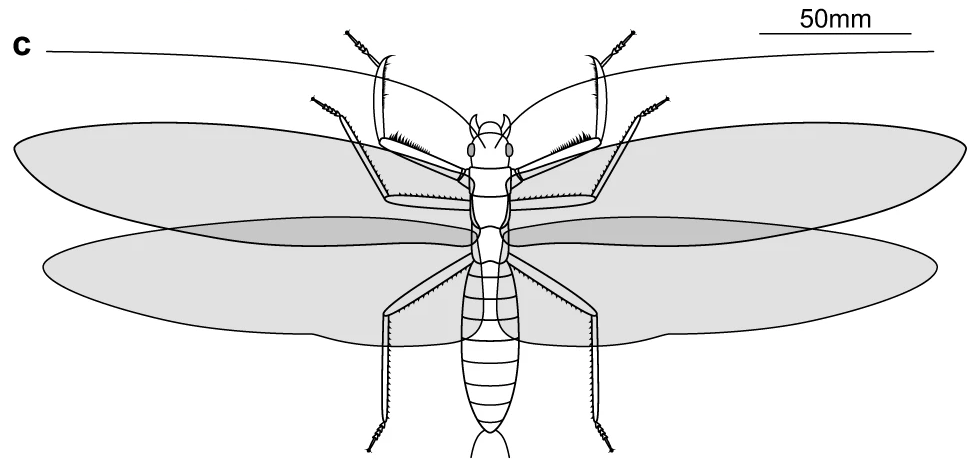
Reconstruction of Gigatitan vulgaris, showing its large size

Titanopterans are related to modern grasshoppers, but were much larger, had proportionally weaker hindlegs that could not allow the animals to leap, and grasping forelegs and elongated mandibles. Another distinctive feature was the presence of prominent fluted regions on the forewings, which may have been used in stridulation. The general shape and anatomy of the titanopterans suggests that they were predators.

An examination of a fossil of the oldest titanopteran genus, Theiatitan, seems to indicate that titanopterans did not utilize stridulation (unlike modern orthopterans), but rather used flashes of light from wing displays and crepitation, moving their wings to produce sound. The authors argue that stridulation, crepitation, castanet signaling or light flash alone do not fully explains the diversity of structures observed in Titanoptera, and note that both sexes seem to have the fluted region on the forewing. Theiatian is 50 Ma older than the previous oldest species of Titanoptera, and thus Theiatitan would be the oldest known insect with a wing structure specialized for communication.

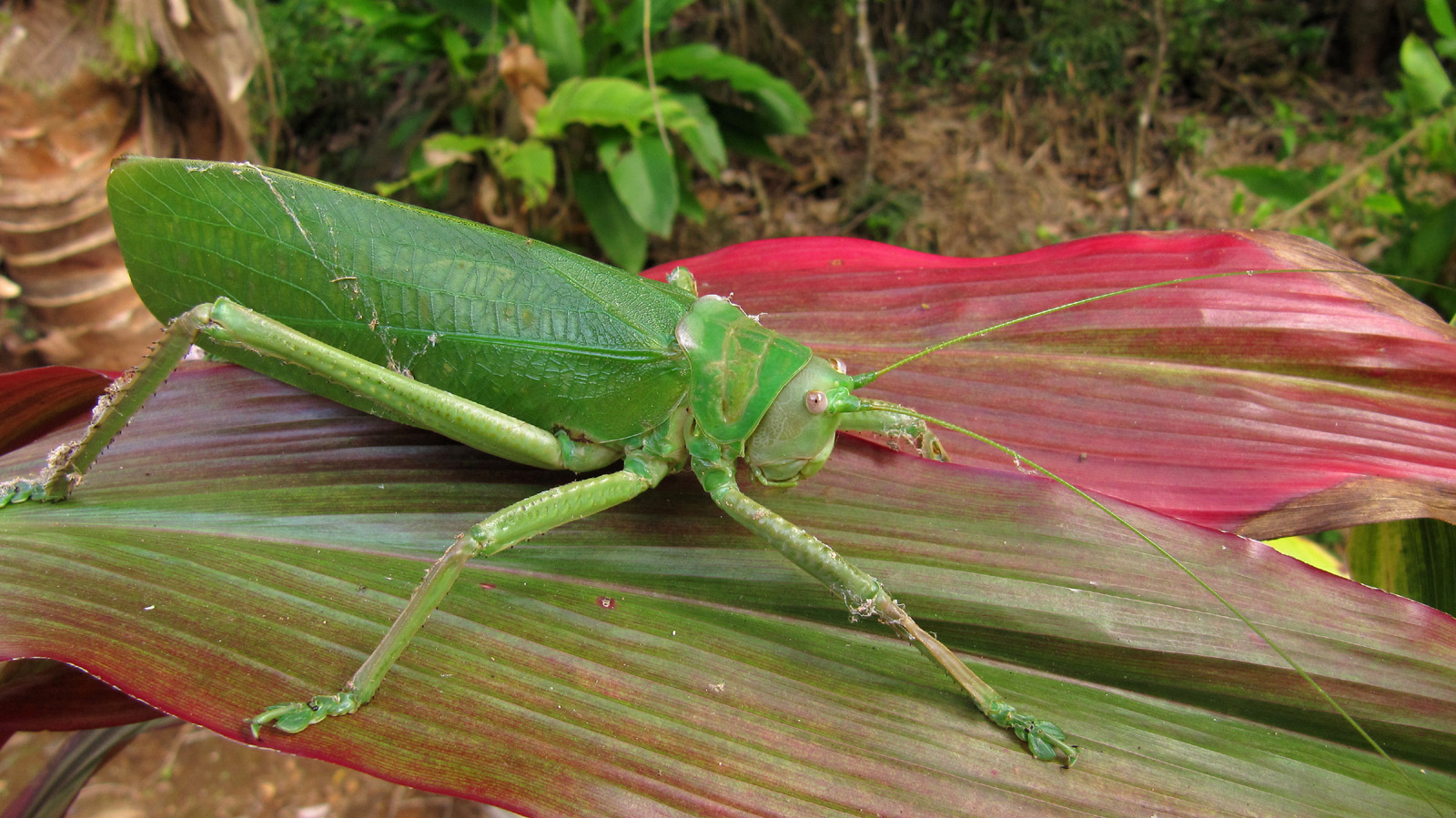
Pseudophyllanax imperialis, modern orthopteran with hind wing area close to that of Gigatitan

Some titanopterans may have been able to only glide, not fly, such as Gigatitan vulgaris. The hind wing area of it is almost the same as that of Pseudophyllanax imperialis, one of the largest modern Orthoptera, and a poor flier, but Gigatitan is larger in volume. All known hind wings of Titanoptera, whatever their sizes, have quite reduced vannus, while most extant flying Orthoptera have large ones.

Other than Theiatitan, reliable records of titanopterans are known from Kyrgyzstan, Australia and South Korea. Considering some possible records from Russia as well, titanopterans possibly had a circum-Tethys distribution.

== Classification ==
There is controversy regarding the classification of Titanoptera. Titanoptera was previously thought to be related to Geraridae (including Gerarus), but this is no longer supported. Béthoux (2007) considered that genera in Titanoptera should be included in Orthoptera, deriving from the extinct orthopteran family Tchomanvissidae. Huang et al. (2020) questioned this relationship, indicating the need for further investigation. In 2020, Béthoux replyed to this publication, further arguing for the nesting of titanopterans within tcholmanvissiids.

Three genera known from Permian, Permotitan, Deinotitan, Monstrotitan possibly do not belong to Titanoptera. Although the genus Jubilaeus originally belonged to Mesotitanidae, it was later considered to belong to Tcholmanvissiidae. Steinhardtia was originally attributed to Titanoptera, but its fossils do not show the venational structures of the order Titanoptera, and it might be a misidentification of a plant fossil, possibly a fern.

The following taxa are recognised in the order Titanoptera:

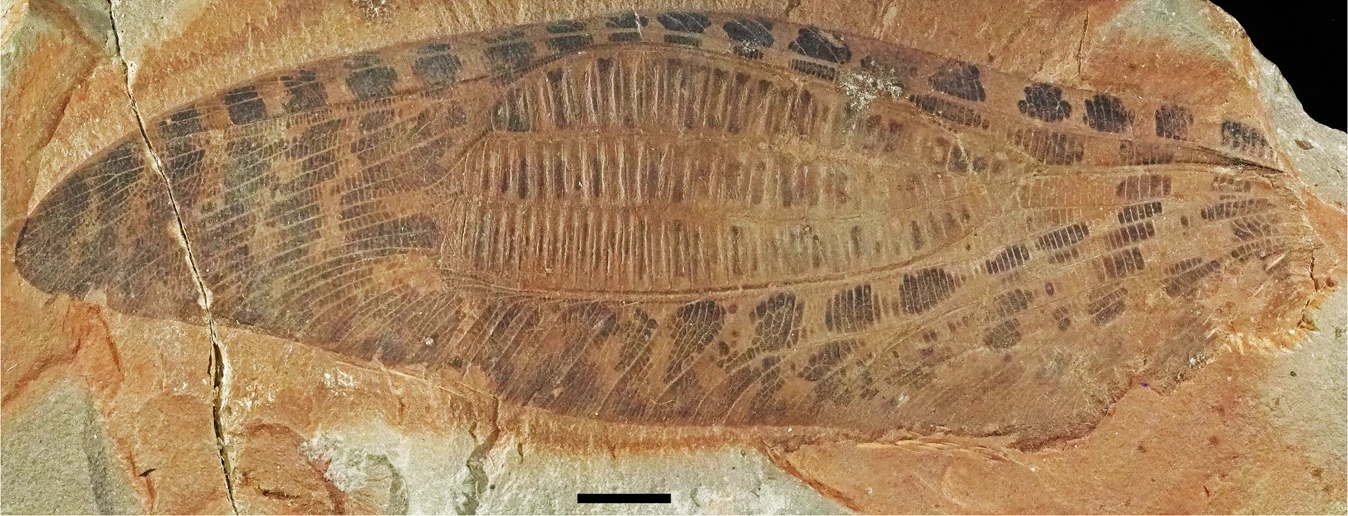
Forewing of Clatrotitan andersoni.

- Order Titanoptera Sharov, 1968
  - Family †Mesotitanidae Tillyard, 1925 (= †Clathrotitanidae Riek, 1954)
    - Subfamily †Mesotitaninae Tillyard, 1925
      - Genus †Mesotitanodes Sharov, 1968
      - Genus †Ultratitan Sharov, 1968
      - Tribe †Mesotitanini Tillyard, 1925 (= †Gigatitanidae Sharov, 1968)
        - Genus †Clatrotitan McKeown, 1937 (= †Clathrotitan McKeown, 1937) (Originally considered as synonym of Mesotitan but proposed by some to be kept)
        - Genus †Gigatitan Sharov, 1968
        - Genus †Mesotitan Tillyard, 1925
        - Genus †Nanotitan Sharov, 1968
        - Genus †Ootitan Sharov, 1968
    - Subfamily †Prototitaninae Gorochov, 2003
      - Genus †Prototitan Sharov, 1968
  - Family †Paratitanidae Sharov, 1968
    - Genus †Magnatitan Park, Kim, Nam & Lee, 2022
    - Genus †Minititan Gorochov, 2007 (= †Microtitan Gorochov, 2003)
    - Genus †Paratitan Sharov, 1968
  - Family †Theiatitanidae Schubnel, Roques & Nel, 2021
    - Genus †Theiatitan Schubnel, Roques & Nel, 2021

Taxa with contentious placement in Titanoptera:

- Genus †Jubilaeus Sharov, 1968
- Genus †Tcholmanvissiella Gorochov, 1987
- Family †Deinotitanidae Gorochov, 2007 (= †Deinotitaninae Gorochov, 2007)
  - Genus †Deinotitan Gorochov, 2007
  - Genus †Monstrotitan Gorochov, 2013
- Family †Tcholmanvissiidae Zalessky, 1934
  - Genus †Pinegia Martynov, 1928 (= †Kamaites Zalessky, 1929; = †Thnetodes Martynov, 1928; = †Tylliardiella Martynov, 1930)
  - Genus †Tcholmanvissia Zalessky, 1929
  - Genus †Yinpingia Lin, 1982
- Family †Tettoedischiidae Gorochov, 1987
  - Genus †Macroedischia Sharov, 1968
  - Genus †Tettoedischia Sharov, 1968
