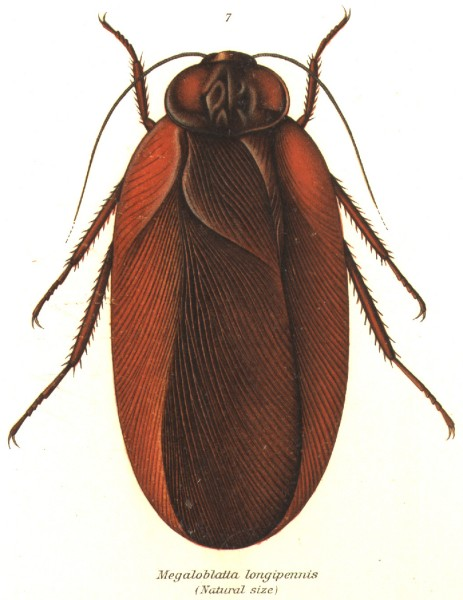
- Megaloblatta longipennis

Scientific classification
- Kingdom: Animalia
- Phylum: Arthropoda
- Clade: Pancrustacea
- Class: Insecta
- Order: Blattodea
- Family: Ectobiidae
- Subfamily: Nyctiborinae
- Genus: Megaloblatta; Dohrn, 1887

Species
- Megaloblatta blaberoides; Megaloblatta insignis; Megaloblatta longipennis (Walker, 1868); Megaloblatta regina

= Megaloblatta =

Genus of cockroaches

Megaloblatta is a genus of Neotropical cockroaches in the family Ectobiidae. Species in this genus are 4 to 9.7 cm (1.6–3.8 in) long and can have a wingspan of up to 20 cm (8 in); the world's largest cockroach by length and wingspan is M. longipennis.

Megaloblatta, like many other insects, use stridulation in order to steer their predators away. The stridulating insects are less likely to be preyed upon in comparison to individuals of the species with an inability to stridulate.

== Range ==
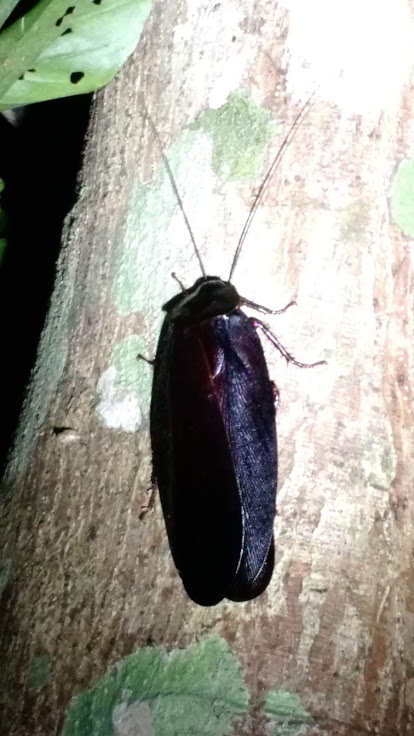
Megaloblatta blaberoides in Costa Rica; the three other species are all restricted to South America

The four Megaloblatta species have separate distributions: M. blaberoides ranges from southern Mexico, through Central America to Colombia and Ecuador; M. insignis is restricted to French Guiana and Suriname; M. longipennis is restricted to Colombia, Ecuador and Peru (although sometimes reported from Panama, this is based on misidentifications of M. blaberoides); and M. regina is from Amazonian Ecuador and Brazil.

== See also ==
- List of largest insects
