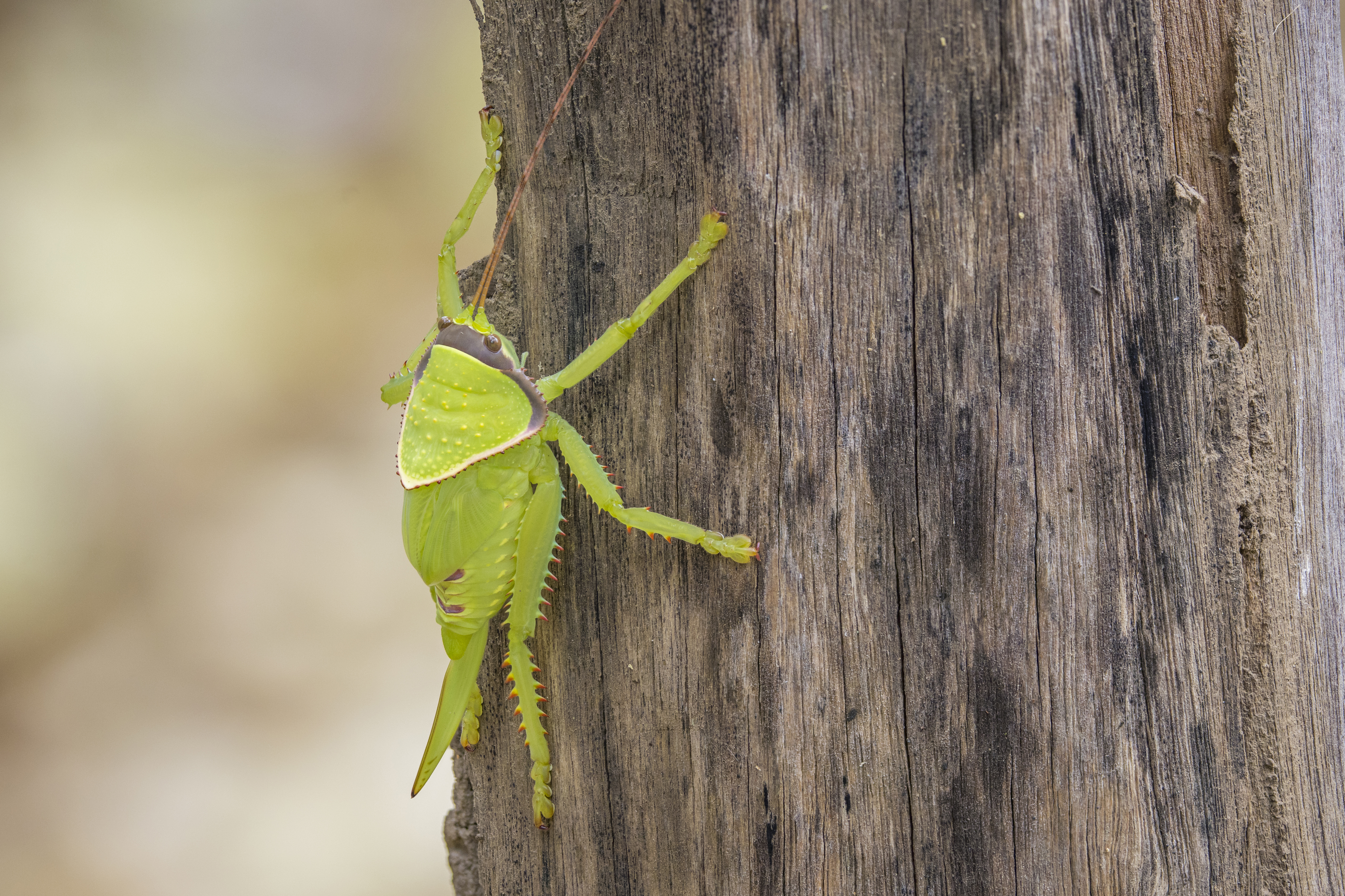

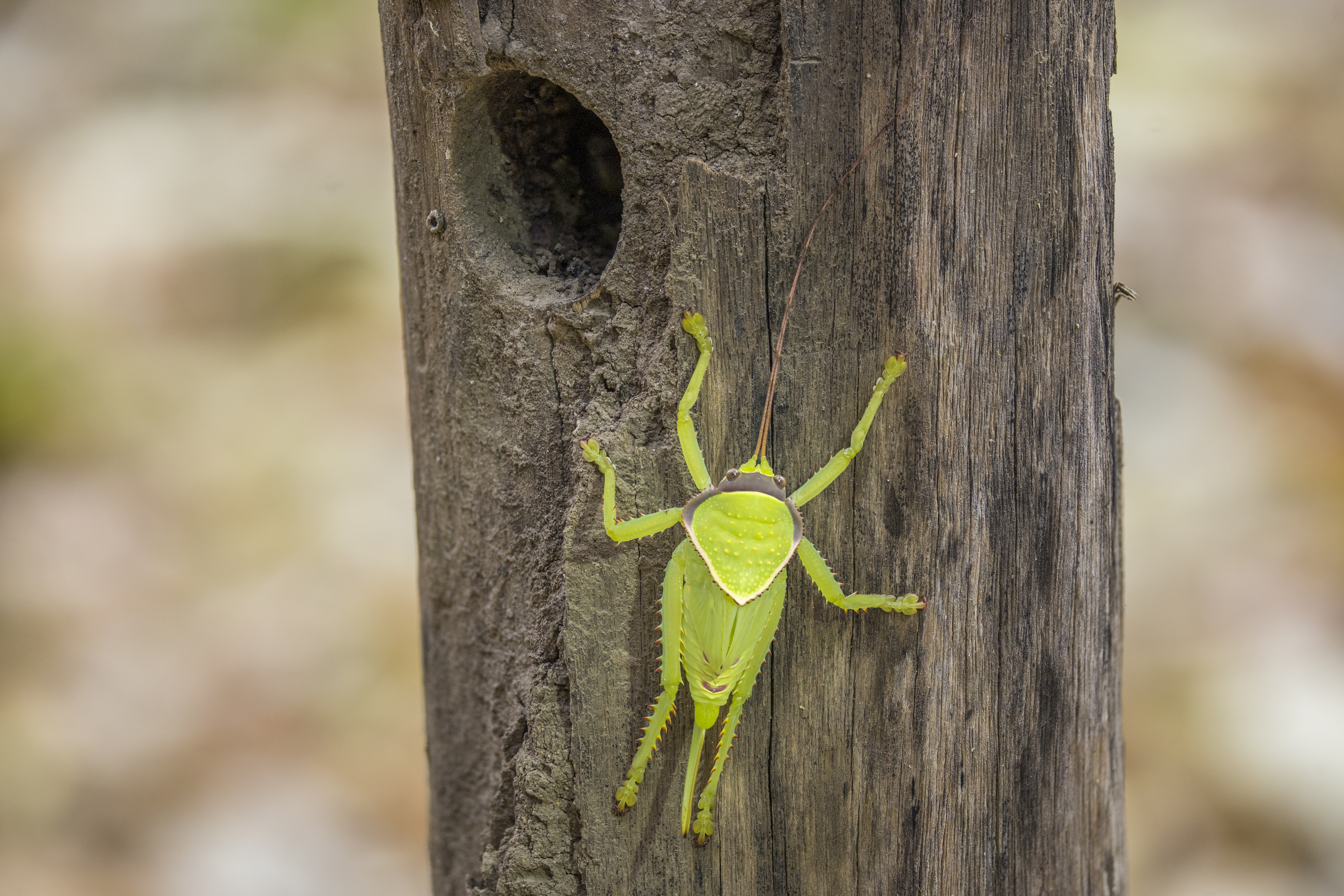

Scientific classification
- Kingdom: Animalia
- Phylum: Arthropoda
- Clade: Pancrustacea
- Class: Insecta
- Order: Orthoptera
- Suborder: Ensifera
- Family: Tettigoniidae
- Subfamily: Pseudophyllinae
- Supertribe: Pseudophylliti
- Tribe: Pseudophyllini
- Genus: Pseudophyllus
- Species: P. titan

Binomial name
- Pseudophyllus titan White, 1846

Synonyms
- Pseudophyllus rex (Brunner von Wattenwyl, 1893)

= Pseudophyllus titan =

Species of cricket-like animal

Pseudophyllus titan, the giant false leaf katydid (a name also used for a few other species), is a species of leaf-mimic bush-cricket of the subfamily Pseudophyllinae found in the canopy of tropical forests in Mainland Southeast Asia, Sindh, Pakistan, Bangladesh (the species' type locality is Sylhet), northeastern India (Assam and Nagaland), and southernmost China (Yunnan). It is among the largest species in the genus Pseudophyllus, which also makes it one of the world's largest Orthoptera, with a typical length of 13 cm (5.1 in) from head to tip of the folded wings and a wingspan of c. 23 cm (9.1 in). Like many other species of crickets and grasshoppers, the male is capable of stridulation, producing a relatively loud and distinctive, bird-like chirp; it usually stridulates ("sings") at night.

Commercialized framed specimens sold to insect collectors can often be found under the name "Sasuma grasshopper". In some parts of its range, it is sometimes roasted and eaten as a snack.
