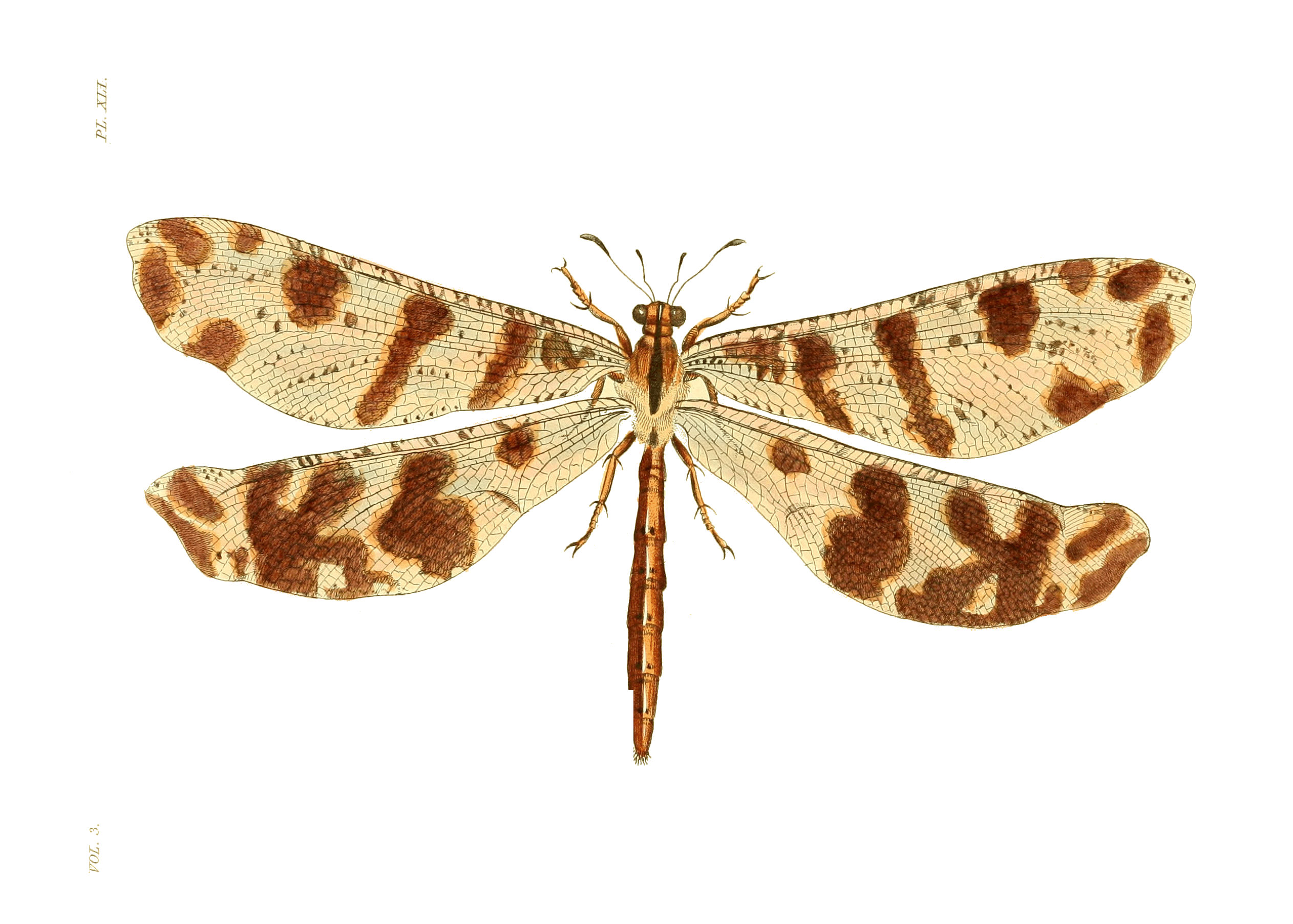
- Lachlathetes gigas

Scientific classification
- Kingdom: Animalia
- Phylum: Arthropoda
- Class: Insecta
- Order: Neuroptera
- Family: Ascalaphidae
- Subfamily: Ascalaphinae
- Tribe: Palparini
- Genus: Lachlathetes; Navás, 1926

Species
- 6. See text

= Lachlathetes =

Genus of insects

Lachlathetes is a genus of antlions in the subfamily Palparinae. Species occur in tropical Africa and Asia.

== Species ==
- Lachlathetes chiangi (Banks, 1941) (southern China)
- Lachlathetes contrarius (Walker, 1853) (Burma, India, Kampuchea, Sri Lanka, Vietnam)
- Lachlathetes falcatus (McLachlan, [1867]) (Burma, Kampuchea, Sri Lanka, Vietnam)
- Lachlathetes furfuraceus (Rambur, 1842) (tropical east Africa)
- Lachlathetes gigas (Dalman, 1823) (Gabon, Guinea, Sierra Leone)
- Lachlathetes moestus (Hagen, 1853) (Botswana, Mozambique, South Africa, Tanzania)
