= Blepharotes rischbiethi =

Scientific classification
- Kingdom: Animalia
- Phylum: Arthropoda
- Clade: Pancrustacea
- Class: Insecta
- Order: Diptera
- Family: Asilidae
- Genus: Blepharotes
- Species: B. rischbiethi

Binomial name
- Blepharotes rischbiethi Lavigne, 2009

Species of fly

Blepharotes rischbiethi is a species of large predatory fly from Australia in the family Asilidae (robber flies). It was described by Robert Lavigne and Andy Young in 2009.

== Description ==
Male body length measures 33–39 mm (1.3–1.5 in). Females measure 35–40 mm (1.4–1.6 in). The abdomen is bright orange and the beard is white. B. rischbiethi is easily distinguished from other species of the genus by the presence of heavy white setation on the sides of abdominal tergites 1 and 2.

== Distribution ==
This species has been found in Queensland and South Australia, including Kangaroo Island.

== Behaviour ==
Adults have been recorded feeding on beetles, flies and bees.
