= Tettoedischiidae =

Tettoedischiidae Temporal range: Kungurian

Scientific classification
- Domain: Eukaryota
- Kingdom: Animalia
- Phylum: Arthropoda
- Class: Insecta
- Order: †Titanoptera
- Superfamily: †Tettoedischioidea
- Family: †Tettoedischiidae; Gorochov, 1987

Extinct family of cricket-like animals

Tettoedischiidae is an extinct family of Orthoptera. There are at least two genera and two described species in Tettoedischiidae.

== Genera ==
These two genera belong to the family Tettoedischiidae:

- † Macroedischia Sharov, 1968
- † Tettoedischia Sharov, 1968
