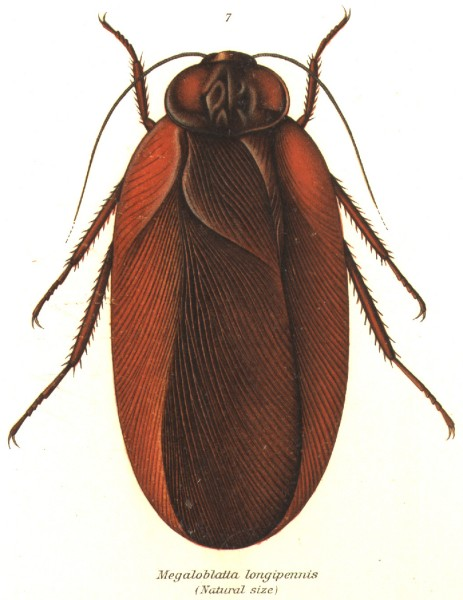

Scientific classification
- Kingdom: Animalia
- Phylum: Arthropoda
- Clade: Pancrustacea
- Class: Insecta
- Order: Blattodea
- Family: Ectobiidae
- Genus: Megaloblatta
- Species: M. longipennis

Binomial name
- Megaloblatta longipennis (Walker, 1868)

Synonyms
- Blabera longipennis Walker, 1868; Megaloblatta peruviana Dohrn, 1887

= Megaloblatta longipennis =

Large species of cockroach

Megaloblatta longipennis is a species of cockroach in the family Ectobiidae. It is the world's largest cockroach by length and wingspan. It is native to Colombia, Ecuador and Peru;. Its range does not extend into Panama; although misreports have been made based on misidentifications of the closely related and similar M. blaberoides (the only Central American species in the genus).

== Description ==
Members of M. longipennis are known for their exceptional size; the largest specimen measured 9.7 cm (3.8 in) in length, 4.5 cm (1.8 in) in width, and had a wingspan of 20 cm (8 in). The related M. blaberoides, which is quite similar but differs in certain morphological features, can reach about the same length and almost as much, 18.5 cm (7.3 in), in wingspan.
