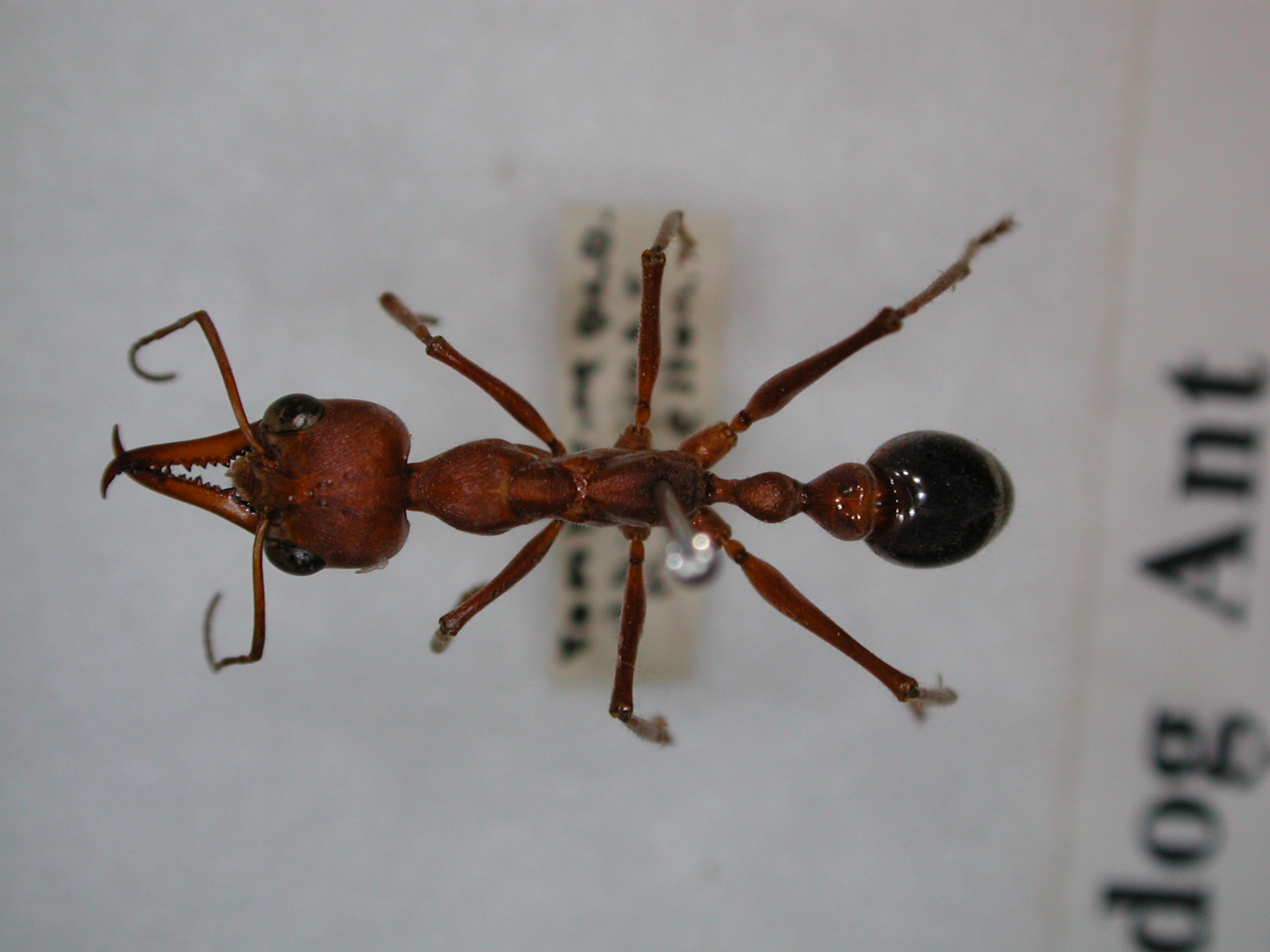
- Myrmecia brevinoda specimen

Scientific classification
- Kingdom: Animalia
- Phylum: Arthropoda
- Class: Insecta
- Order: Hymenoptera
- Family: Formicidae
- Subfamily: Myrmeciinae
- Genus: Myrmecia
- Species: M. brevinoda

Binomial name
- Myrmecia brevinoda Forel, 1910

= Myrmecia brevinoda =

Species of ant endemic to Australia

Myrmecia brevinoda is a species of bull ant native to Australia. These ants are only found in the eastern Australian states of Queensland (only in the eastern areas), New South Wales, Victoria, and the Australian Capital Territory. It was first described in 1910.

Worker ants have been known to measure 3.7 cm (1.5 in) in total length, while queens can exceed 4.0 cm (1.6 in) in length, making them one of the largest types of bull ants in Australia and in the world. Most of their bodies are dark red, with the exception of the bulbous parts of their abdomens being black.

== See also ==
- List of largest insects
