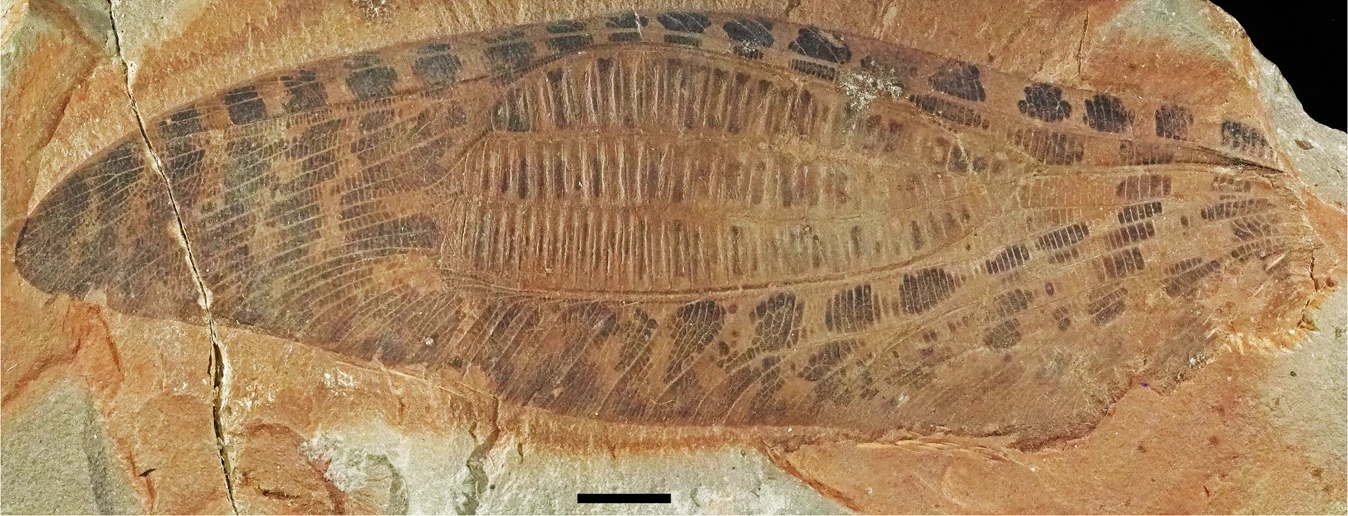
- Forewing of Clathrotitan andersoni (Scale bar: 10 mm)
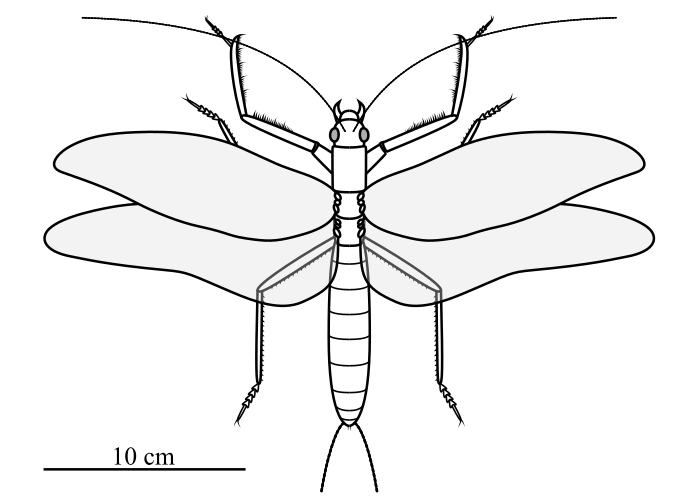
- Speculative diagrammatic reconstruction, missing elements reconstructed after Gigatitan

Scientific classification
- Kingdom: Animalia
- Phylum: Arthropoda
- Class: Insecta
- Order: †Titanoptera
- Family: †Mesotitanidae
- Genus: †Clathrotitan; McKeown, 1937

Type species
- Clathrotitan andersoni McKeown, 1937

Species
- C. andersoni McKeown, 1937; C. scullyi? Tillyard, 1925

Synonyms
- Clatrotitan McKeown, 1937 (misspelled)

= Clathrotitan =

Clathrotitan Temporal range: Anisian

Extinct species of winged insect

Clathrotitan, also called as Clatrotitan is an extinct genus of titanopteran insect, known from the Triassic of Australia. It is originally described from a species, C. andersoni, then later study considered that Mesotitan scullyi as species of Clathrotitan too, synonymizing C. andersoni to C. scullyi. But another study synonymized Mesotitan and Clathrotitan. A study in 2021 proposed to keep the two genera Clathrotitan and Mesotitan separated, keeping Mesotitan only include type species M. giganteus and keeping two species Clathrotitan. A 2024 study supported to synonymize C. scullyi and C. andersoni. C. andersoni had a large forewing, which was 13.8 centimetres (5.4 in) long.
