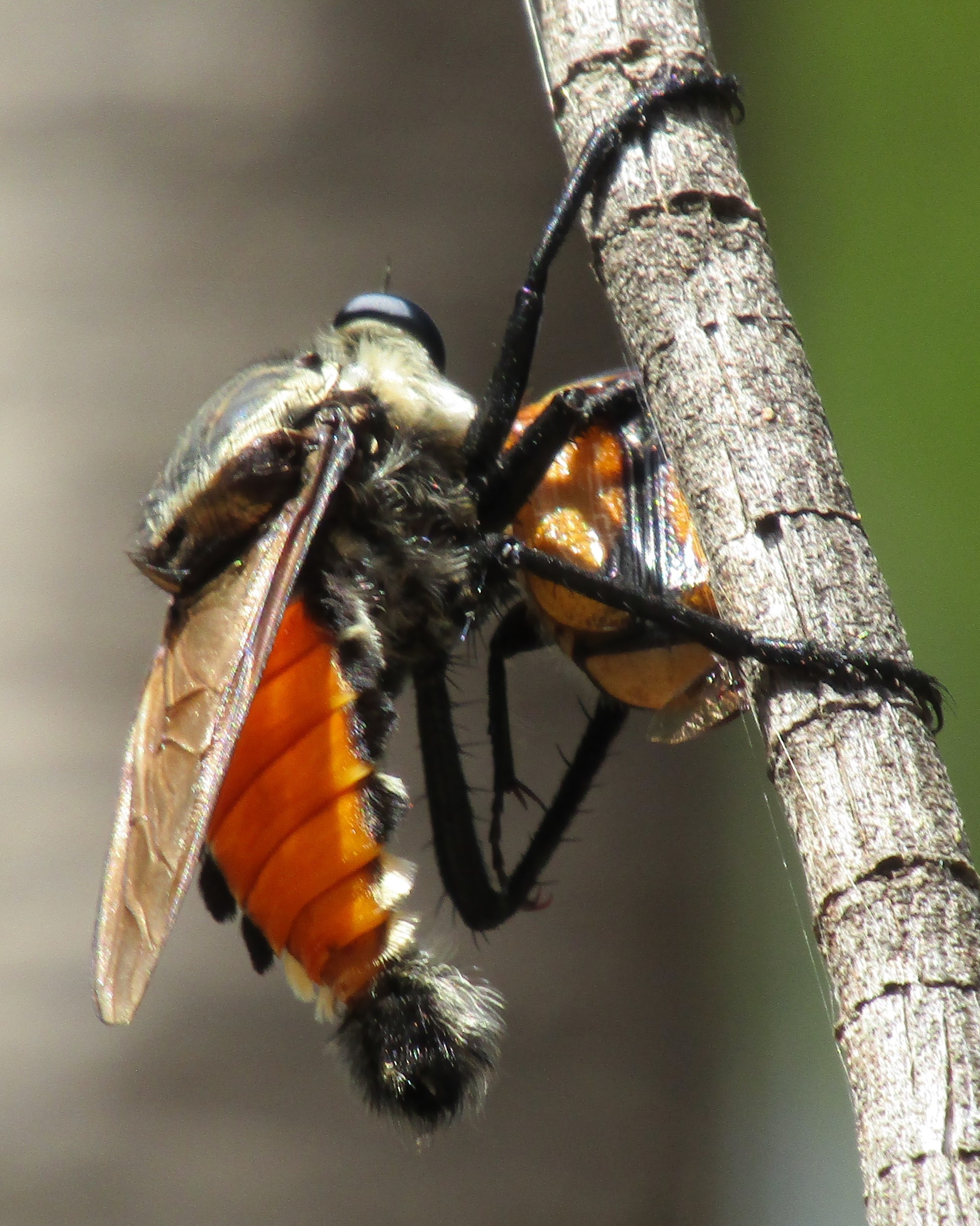
- Blepharotes coriarius with beetle prey

Scientific classification
- Kingdom: Animalia
- Phylum: Arthropoda
- Clade: Pancrustacea
- Class: Insecta
- Order: Diptera
- Family: Asilidae
- Genus: Blepharotes
- Species: B. coriarius

Binomial name
- Blepharotes coriarius Wiedemann, 1830

= Blepharotes coriarius =

Species of fly

Blepharotes coriarius, the giant yellow robber fly, is a species of large predatory fly from Australia in the family Asilidae (robber flies). It was described by the German naturalist Christian Rudolph Wilhelm Wiedemann in 1830.

== Description ==
Blepharotes coriarius is one of the largest known robber flies. It can measure up to 48mm in length (including proboscis). Both sexes have orange abdominal tergites, with patches of black setae along the sides of segments 1–5 and mostly white setae along the sides of segments 6 and 7.

== Distribution ==
The giant yellow robber fly is found in the Australian states of Queensland, New South Wales, Victoria, South Australia and Western Australia.

== Behaviour ==
Adults can be found from December to February. They are usually seen resting on dead plants, with the body aligned vertically and the head pointing upwards. Insect prey are taken in the air after the fly launches itself from a vantage point. Recorded prey items include beetles, bees, wasps and flying ants. Feeding time varies from less than two minutes (for a large ant) up to 17 minutes (for a scarab beetle).

Males of B. coriarius attempt to mate with any member of the same species (whether male or female) that enters their territory, which is usually the area around a dead tree. Intruding males are driven off by this. A few minutes after successful copulation, females begin laying eggs into gaps of dead eucalypts, or into cracks in the ground at the base of such trees. She generally begins oviposition in the top soil, before gradually flying up the tree, depositing more eggs as she goes.

Pupae first emerge from the soil at the beginning of December. The pupal cases are around 35mm long, with reddish brown spines and processes glistening reddish brown to dark brown.
