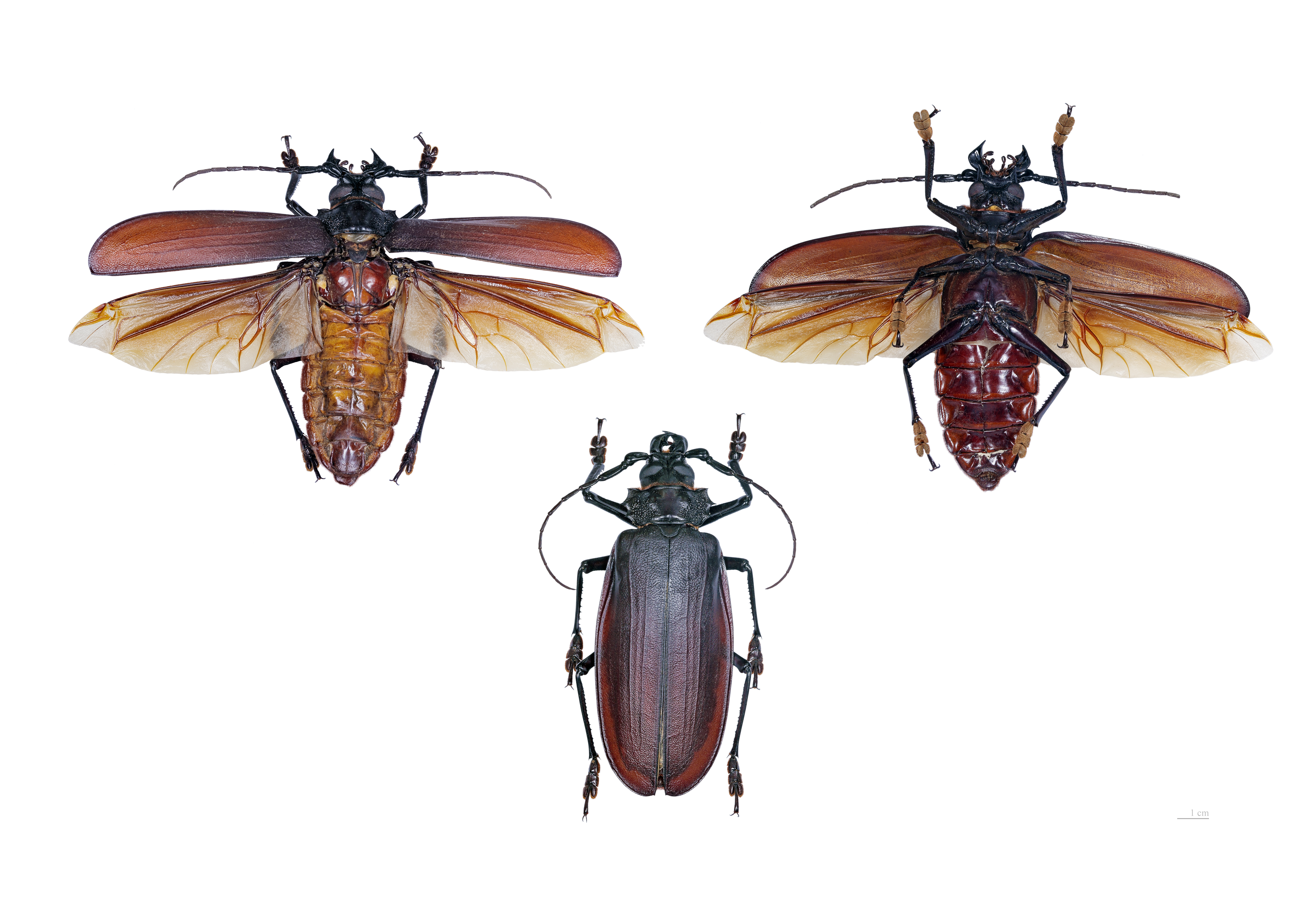
- Titanus giganteus

Scientific classification
- Kingdom: Animalia
- Phylum: Arthropoda
- Clade: Pancrustacea
- Class: Insecta
- Order: Coleoptera
- Suborder: Polyphaga
- Infraorder: Cucujiformia
- Family: Cerambycidae
- Subfamily: Prioninae
- Tribe: Prionini
- Genus: Titanus; Audinet-Serville, 1832
- Species: T. giganteus

Binomial name
- Titanus giganteus (Linnaeus, 1771)

Synonyms
- (Genus): Percnopterus Gistel, 1848; (Species): Cerambyx giganteus Linnaeus, 1771; Prionus giganteus; Percnopterus giganteus

= Titan beetle =

Species of beetles

The titan beetle (Titanus giganteus) is a Neotropical species of longhorn beetle, the sole species in the genus Titanus, and one of the largest known beetles, as well as one of the largest known insects, at over 170 mm (6.7 in) in length. Adult titan beetles only live for a few weeks, and protect themselves from predators with their sharp spines and powerful jaws.

== Distribution and habitat ==
The titan beetle is native to tropical rainforests throughout South America, including Venezuela, Colombia, Ecuador, Peru, the Guianas, and north-central Brazil. While the Titan Beetle is most generally associated with the Amazon Rainforest, it may also be found in other parts of South America if ecological conditions are favorable. This comprises sections of the Atlantic Forest in Brazil, the Orinoco Basin in Venezuela, and the Chocó-Darién region in Colombia.

These beetles are primarily found in old-growth forests with plenty of rotting wood, which serves as their principal food supply. They can, however, be found in secondary forests and disturbed habitats where sufficient circumstances for survival exist.

Despite their broad distribution throughout South America, the titan beetle is secretive and rarely seen due to its nocturnal habits and cryptic behavior. As a result, thorough surveys and research are required to acquire a better knowledge of its distribution throughout its range, as well as population dynamics within various forest habitats. However, like many other species that live in tropical rainforests, the titan beetle is threatened by habitat degradation, deforestation, and climate change, all of which can have a substantial influence on its distribution and population levels. Conservation activities focused at maintaining their natural habitats are therefore critical for assuring their continued survival.

== Anatomy and physiology ==
Titanus giganteus is known for being one of the largest beetles, spanning over 170 mm (6.7 in). Though great in size, studies have shown that within the family Cerambycidae, they have exceptionally short hind wings. Additionally, the hind wings are not present in females, indicating that they are incapable of flight.

Titan beetles have compound eyes (an eye consisting of an array of numerous small visual units), with hundreds of hexagonal facets covering the central region of the eye and the periphery being covered by pentagonal or squares.

Titanus giganteus has a distinct row of proprioceptive hairs that is visible on the anterior edge of the prothorax. The hairs have a mechanoreceptive function, detecting changes to the body surface to assess the environment.

Their antennae have sensilla which provide sensory information about the environment. There are different types of sensilla, e.g. coeloconic sensilla and sensilla trichoidea, detecting different stimuli. The reproductive system of the titan beetle is very similar to other species within the subfamily Prioninae, with the pupal testis consisting of 12 to 15 lobes each containing 15 follicles. One unusual characteristic regarding the reproductive anatomy of titan beetles is the variation in follicle size. Titan beetles with larger follicles were seen to have greater rates of spermatogenesis. The mechanism for such variation is unknown.

=== Size ===
Insect size is constrained by the amount of air that can be supplied via their respiratory system. The respiratory system of insects is different from mammals, as gas exchange involves tracheal tubes delivering oxygen directly to tissues throughout the beetle's body, instead of having oxygen carried by blood. The constraint on the diffusion of oxygen into the tracheal system limits the maximum body size attainable, as there will be a point where some tissues in the body will not receive oxygen at all. Its approximate volume is 175ml (~6 US fluid ounces).

=== Microbiome ===
Because adult titan beetles do not feed, it is interesting that the very narrow gut microbiota show no activity of proteases, despite there being recorded activity of digestive amylase and lipase activity. Digestive amylase, lipase, and protease in human and other animal organisms are responsible for breaking down food proteins into amino acids for absorption. There is no fat surrounding the gut of T. giganteus, which differs from other Prioninae. It is suggested that the metabolic rate could differ, such that adult titan beetles exhaust all of their fat reserves faster than related beetles. Liquid chromatography-mass spectrometry analysis indicated that 70 percent of the lipids were triacylglycerols. These lipids were found only in the flight muscles, in which the fat reserves were used to provide energy for muscle activity. Within the triacylglycerols, it was found oleic acid is the most abundant.

== Ecology and behavior ==
=== Diet ===
Even though the adults of many species of longhorn beetles are known to utilize a plant diet for sustenance, adults of the Prioninae subfamily do not feed beyond consuming water. Reflected in their anatomy, titan beetles lack the digestive enzymes and fat reserves needed to consume food on a daily basis. Only when the titan beetles are larvae, they ingest dead wood and plants infested by fungi. This initial caloric intake is meant to last the lifetime of the beetle. Their dietary habits as larvae contribute to the recycling of dead plants in the ecosystem, converting decayed matter into humus.

=== Mating ===
Because of the short life span of the titan beetle, little is definitively known about their mating behaviour. It is, however, known that titan beetles locate their mates by sensing pheromones. In the field of coleopterology the larvae of titan beetles have yet to be identified making the study of the life cycle and reproduction of titan beetles very difficult.

== Gallery ==
Titanus giganteus beetles for sale at international meeting of entomologists in Prague

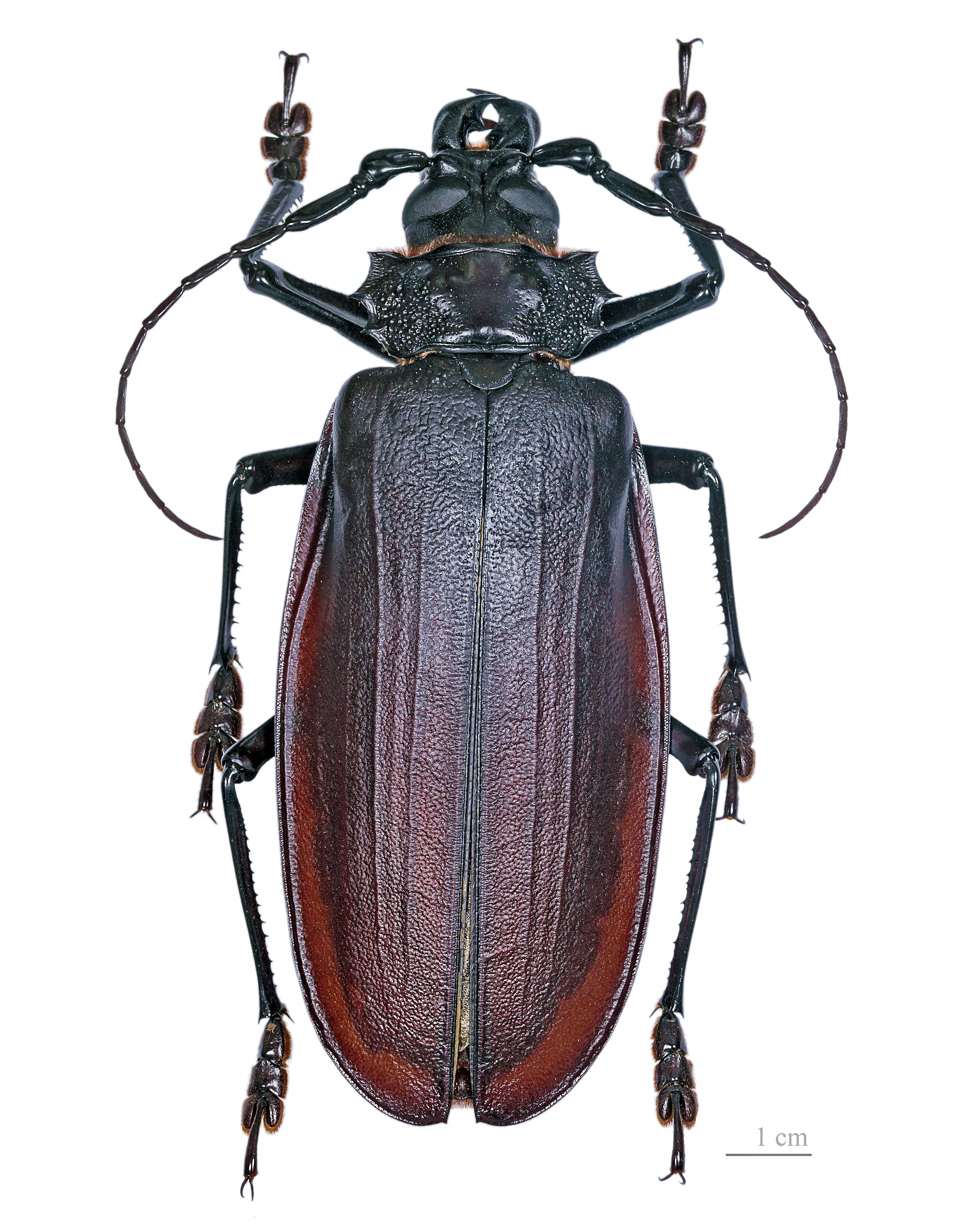
Titanus giganteus male

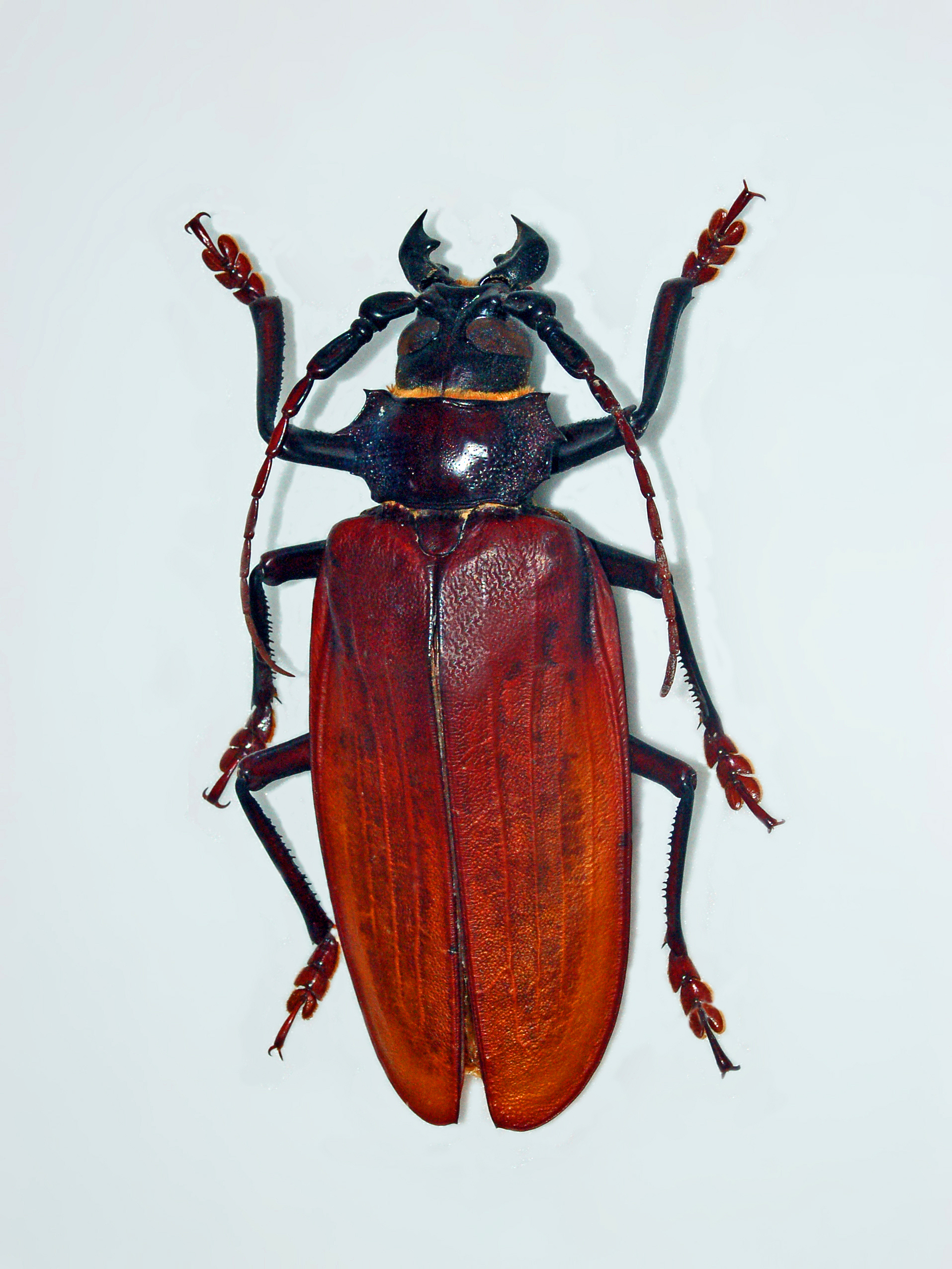
Titanus giganteus at the Montréal Insectarium

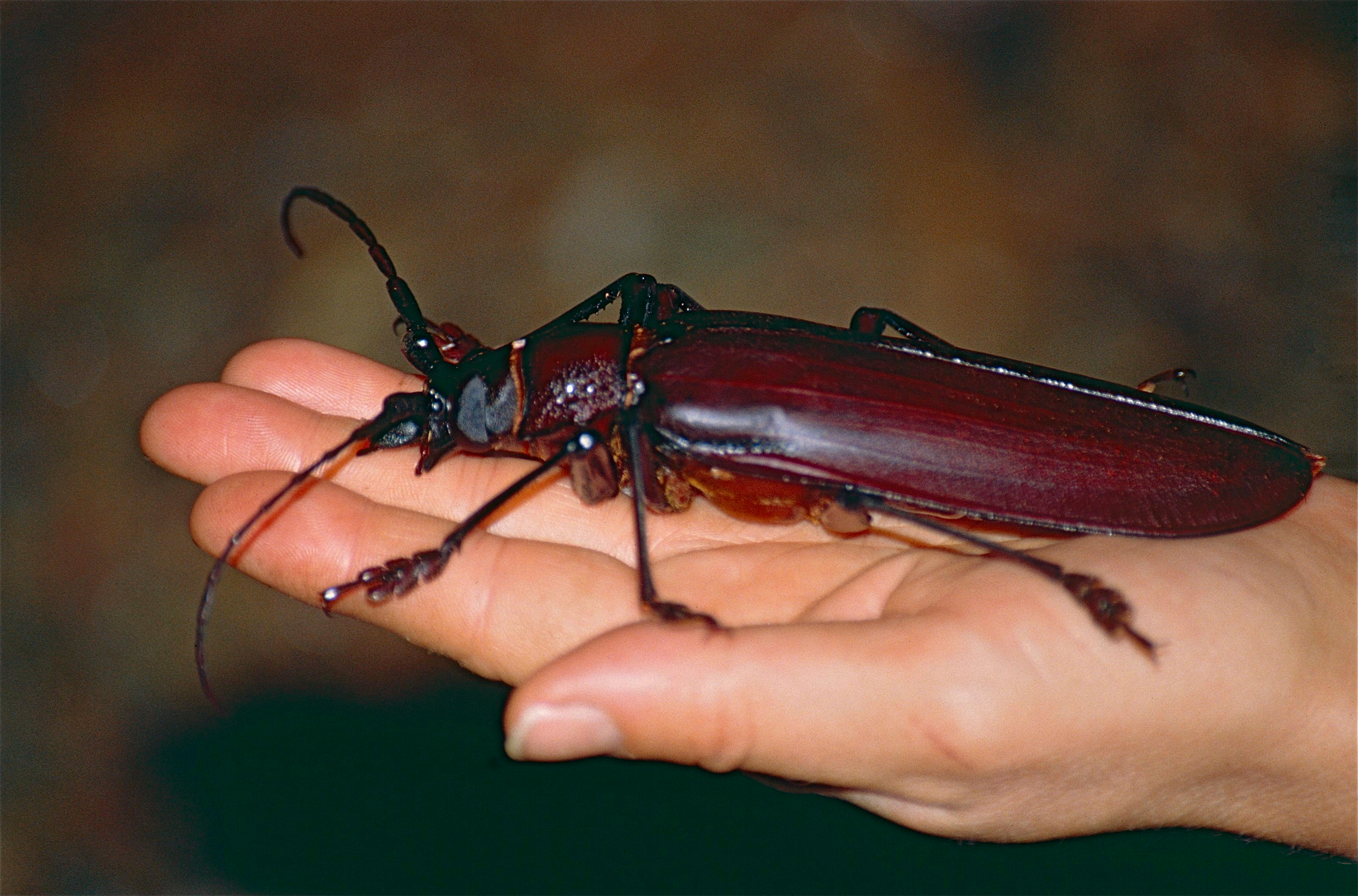

== See also ==
- List of largest insects
