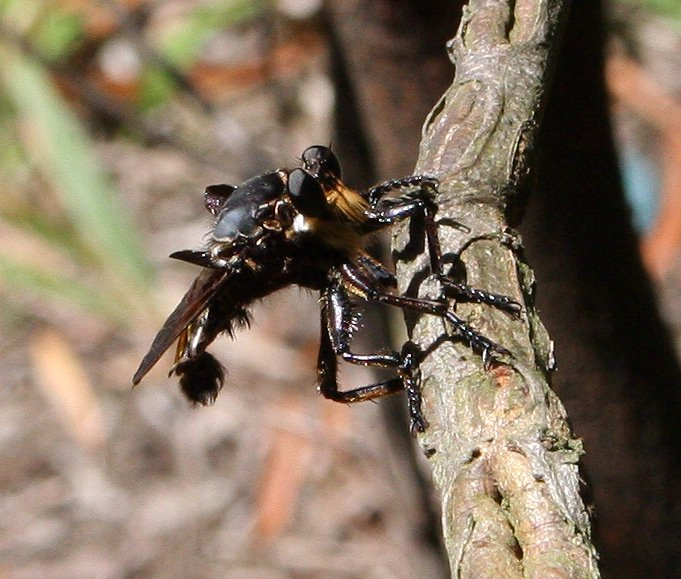
- In Bexley, New South Wales, Australia

Scientific classification
- Kingdom: Animalia
- Phylum: Arthropoda
- Clade: Pancrustacea
- Class: Insecta
- Order: Diptera
- Family: Asilidae
- Genus: Blepharotes
- Species: B. splendidissimus

Binomial name
- Blepharotes splendidissimus (Wiedemann, 1830)

Synonyms
- Laphria splendidissima Wiedemann, 1830

= Blepharotes splendidissimus =

Species of fly

Blepharotes splendidissimus is a robber fly in the family Asilidae found in eastern Australia. Recognised by its shiny black abdomen, it is the second largest of its genus. It was described by the German naturalist Christian Rudolph Wilhelm Wiedemann in 1830 as Laphria splendidissima.

It is around 2.5 cm (1 in) long with a wingspan of 4 cm (1.6 in). It has a black abdomen and dark brown wings.

Walter Wilson Froggatt reported seeing it commonly in the Royal Botanic Gardens, Sydney.
