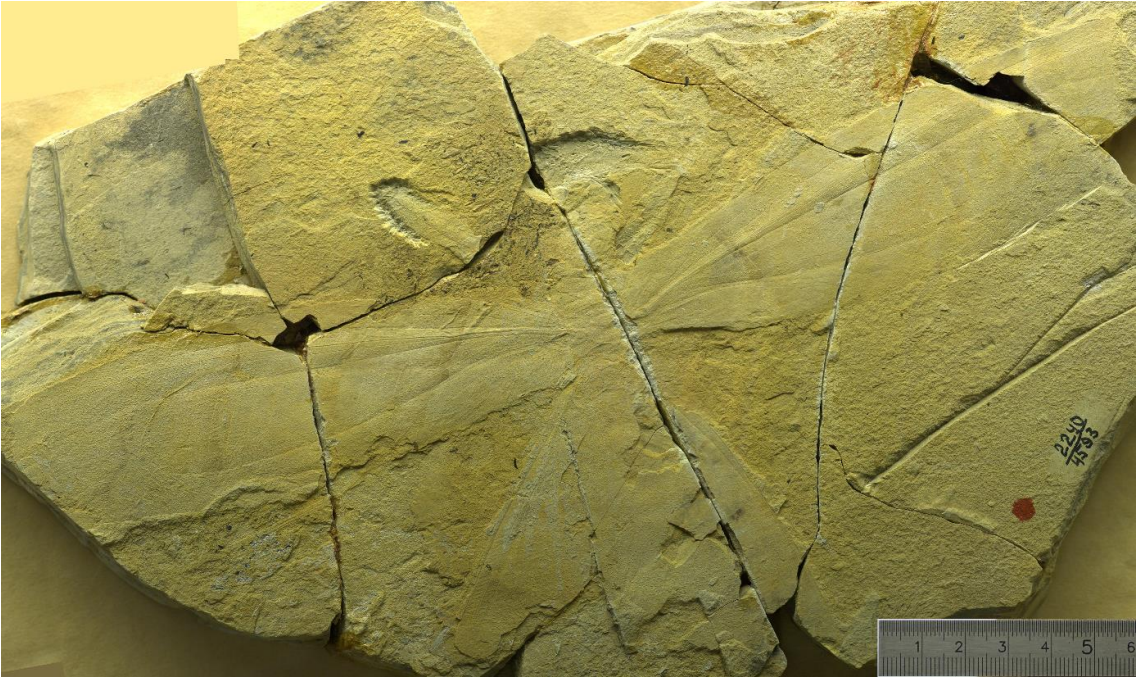
- Fossil of G. vulgaris
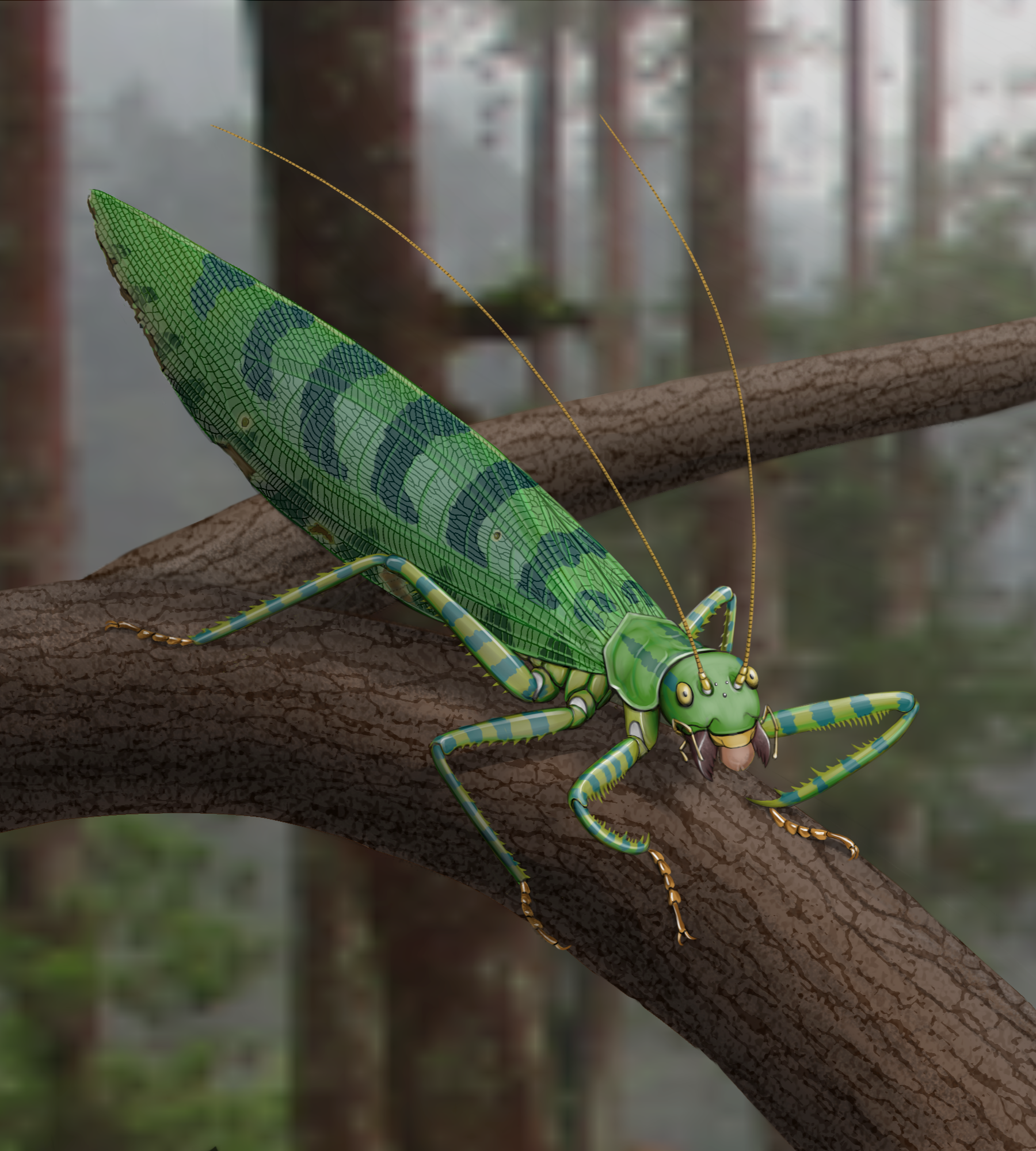
- Life reconstruction of G. vulgaris

Scientific classification
- Kingdom: Animalia
- Phylum: Arthropoda
- Clade: Pancrustacea
- Class: Insecta
- Order: †Titanoptera
- Clade: †Gigatitanidae
- Genus: †Gigatitan; Sharov, 1968

Type species
- Gigatitan vulgaris Sharov, 1968

Species
- G. vulgaris Sharov, 1968; G. magnificus Sharov, 1968; G. extensus Sharov, 1968; G. ovatus Sharov, 1968; G. similis Sharov, 1968

= Gigatitan =

Gigatitan Temporal range: Carnian

Extinct genus of insects

Gigatitan (from Ancient Greek γίγας (gígas), meaning "giant", and Τιτάν (Titán), meaning "Titan") is an extinct genus of titanopteran insect that lived in Kyrgyzstan during the Triassic period. The type species is G. vulgaris, described by Aleksandr Grigorevich Sharov in 1968. Fossils of Gigatitan have been found in the Madygen Formation. It is the type genus of the family Gigatitanidae, in which the closely related Nanotitan and Ootitan are also included.

== Description ==
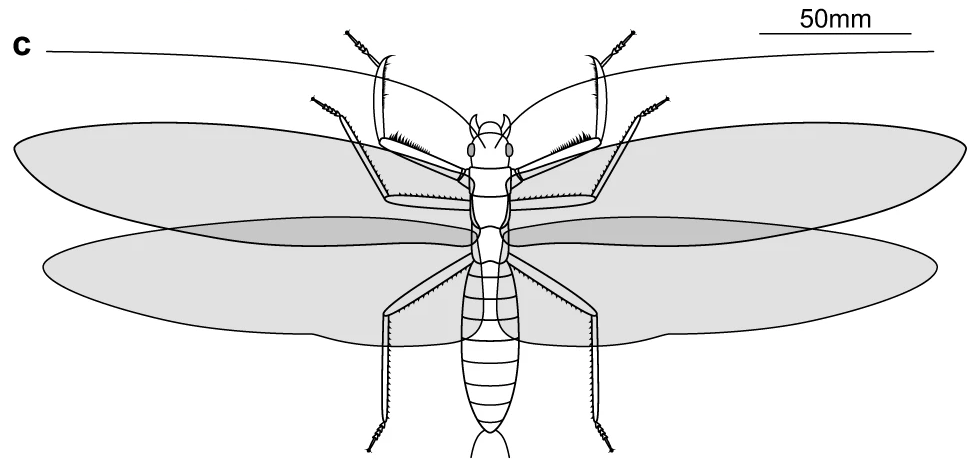
Reconstruction of G. vulgaris

Gigatitan was a large insect, type species, G. vulgaris is estimated to have wingspan up to 40 centimetres (16 in). Although it had large wings, with a hindwing area close to modern large orthopteran Pseudophyllanax imperialis, body volume is estimated to be around 150% heavier than that species, suggesting Gigatitan may not have been able to fly, but probably able to glide. In life, Gigatitan was a mantis-like predator, with forelegs that have similarly enlarged and bore spines for prey capture. It had dark, transverse stripes on its wings, which is similar to modern diurnal mantis Blepharopsis mendica. Also, its wings were able to produce flashes, which would have worked only during the day, and may have possibly substantially reduced predation from predators. These characters suggest that Gigatitan was a diurnal predator. As seen in other titanopteran insects, there were prominent fluted regions on the forewings, suggesting possible use for stridulation, but unlike modern crickets or katydids, both males and females of Gigatitan had wings for stridulation. The ovipositor of Gigatitan bore sharp cutting ridges. These were likely used to excise holes in plant matter for oviposition, similar to some modern Orthoptera.
