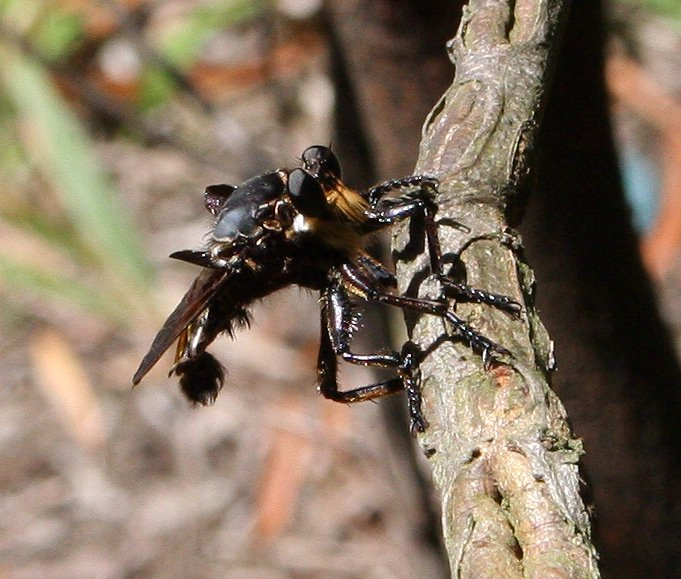
- B. splendidissimus, Bexley, New South Wales

Scientific classification
- Kingdom: Animalia
- Phylum: Arthropoda
- Clade: Pancrustacea
- Class: Insecta
- Order: Diptera
- Family: Asilidae
- Subfamily: Asilinae
- Genus: Blepharotes; Westwood, in Duncan, 1840

Species
- B. aterrimus; B. coriarius; B. rischbiethi; B. splendidissimus

= Blepharotes =

Genus of flies

Blepharotes is a genus of robber fly in the family Asilidae. Its members are found in Eastern Australia. They include the giant yellow robber fly Blepharotes coriarius, and B. splendidissimus.
