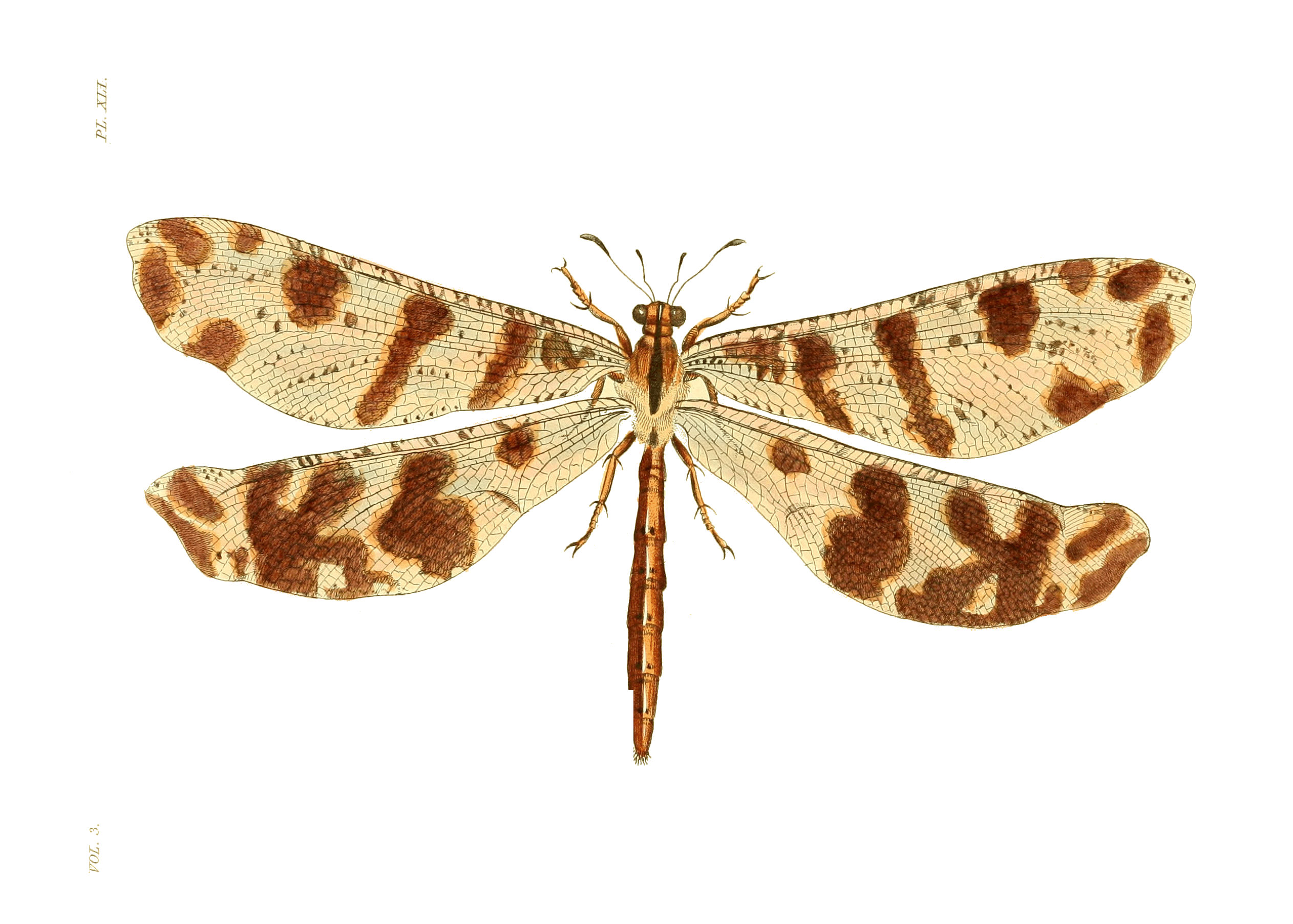
- Illustration by Dru Drury

Scientific classification
- Kingdom: Animalia
- Phylum: Arthropoda
- Clade: Pancrustacea
- Class: Insecta
- Order: Neuroptera
- Family: Ascalaphidae
- Genus: Lachlathetes
- Species: L. gigas

Binomial name
- Lachlathetes gigas (Dalman, 1823)

Synonyms
- Myrmeleon libelluloides var. Drury, 1782; Myrmeleon gigas Dalman, 1823; Myrmeleon torridum Westwood, 1837

= Lachlathetes gigas =

Species of insect

Lachlathetes gigas is a species of antlions in the subfamily Palparinae. It is native to Gabon, Guinea and Sierra Leone. The species was named by Dalman in 1823, based on an insect figured by Dru Drury as a variety of Myrmeleon libelluloides. It is the largest extant Neuropteran, with a wingspan of 177 millimetres (7.0 in).

== Description ==
Antennae black, slender, and thickest at the extremities. Head, neck, and thorax yellowish brown, with a black longitudinal stripe running along the middle. Four palpi, two of which are short; the other two long, slender, and knobbed at the extremities. Thorax nearly covered with grey hairs. Abdomen yellowish brown in preserved specimens (probably green when living). Wings of equal length, the anterior being broadest, all marked with a great number of red-brown spots, and clouds of various shapes and sizes, and appearing to be composed of fine lattice-work like gauze, and perfectly transparent where they are not clouded. Legs nearly of equal length, having two strong tibial spurs. Wing-span 6¾ inches (170 mm).
