= Phasmothrips =

Scientific classification
- Kingdom: Animalia
- Phylum: Arthropoda
- Class: Insecta
- Order: Thysanoptera
- Family: Phlaeothripidae
- Genus: Phasmothrips; Priesner, 1933

Genus of thrips

Phasmothrips is a genus of thrips in the family Phlaeothripidae. Its members are the largest known thrips, reaching lengths of up to 1.3 cm (0.51 in). Its only known species is Phasmothrips asperatus.

== Species ==
- Phasmothrips asperatus
