= Tcholmanvissiidae =

Scientific classification
- Domain: Eukaryota
- Kingdom: Animalia
- Phylum: Arthropoda
- Class: Insecta
- Order: Orthoptera
- Superfamily: †Tcholmanvissioidea
- Family: †Tcholmanvissiidae; Zalessky, 1934

Extinct family of cricket-like animals

Tcholmanvissiidae is an extinct family of Orthoptera. There are at least two genera and about eight described species in Tcholmanvissiidae.

== Genera ==
These two genera belong to the family Tcholmanvissiidae:

- † Pinegia Martynov, 1928
- † Tcholmanvissia Zalessky, 1929
