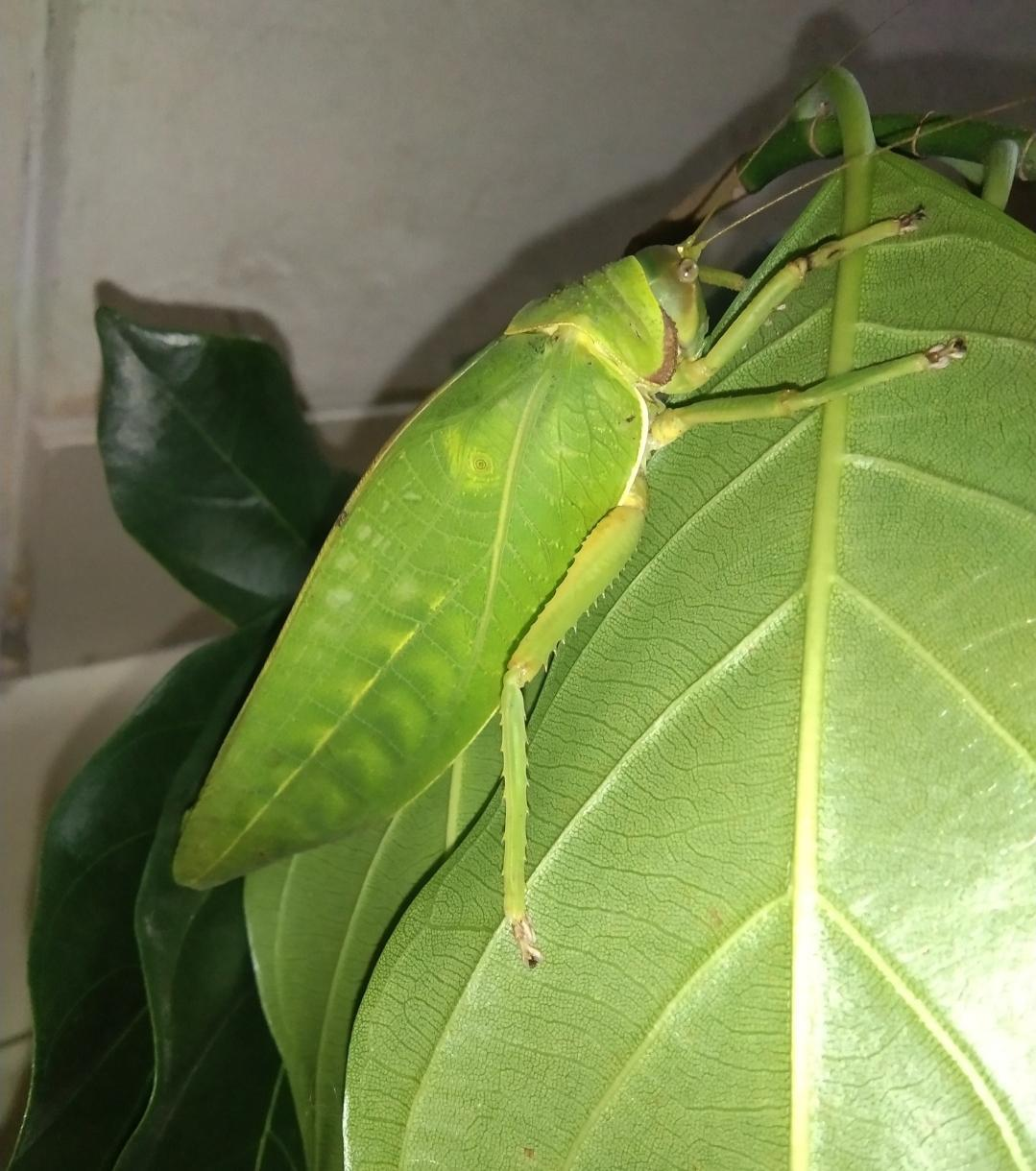
- Pseudophyllus neriifolius from Java

Scientific classification
- Kingdom: Animalia
- Phylum: Arthropoda
- Class: Insecta
- Order: Orthoptera
- Suborder: Ensifera
- Family: Tettigoniidae
- Subfamily: Pseudophyllinae
- Supertribe: Pseudophylliti
- Tribe: Pseudophyllini
- Genus: Pseudophyllus; Serville, 1831

Synonyms
- Cleandrus Stål, 1874

= Pseudophyllus =

Genus of cricket-like animals

Pseudophyllus is a genus of bush-cricket, found in Indo-China and Malesia (including the Philippines). It is the type genus of the tribe Pseudophyllini and the subfamily Pseudophyllinae.

== Species ==
Pseudophyllus includes the following species:

1. Pseudophyllus colosseus (Hebard, 1922) - Borneo
2. Pseudophyllus dyaka (Hebard, 1922) - Borneo
3. Pseudophyllus hercules (Karny, 1923) - Peninsular Malaysia, Borneo
4. Pseudophyllus ligatus (Brunner von Wattenwyl, 1895) - China
5. Pseudophyllus neriifolius (Lichtenstein, 1796) - type species (as Locusta neriifolia Lichtenstein; type locality Java, but also Sumatra)
6. Pseudophyllus simplex Beier, 1954
7. Pseudophyllus teter Walker, 1869 - Philippines
8. Pseudophyllus titan White, 1846 - Indochina
