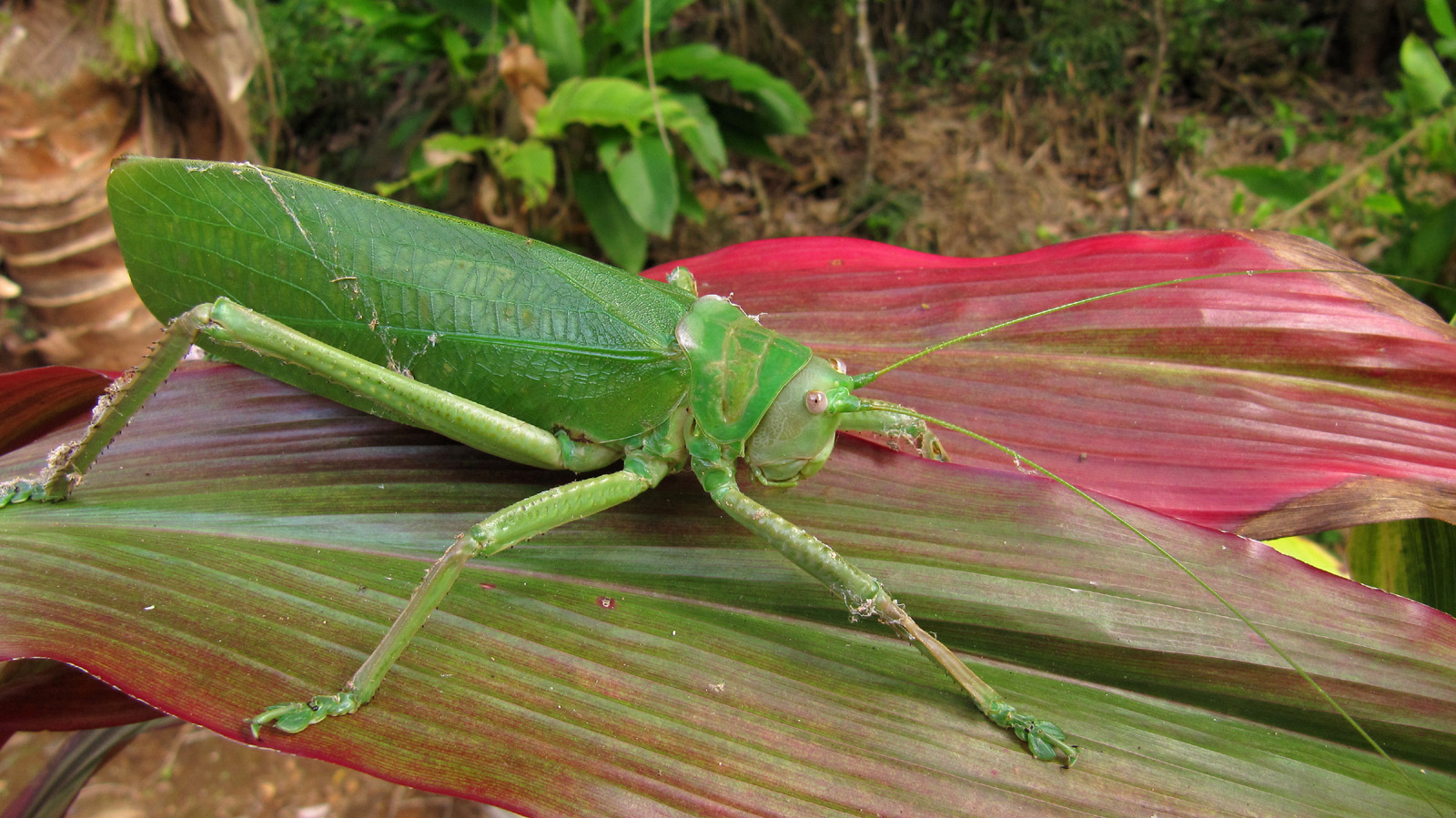

Scientific classification
- Kingdom: Animalia
- Phylum: Arthropoda
- Clade: Pancrustacea
- Class: Insecta
- Order: Orthoptera
- Suborder: Ensifera
- Family: Tettigoniidae
- Subfamily: Mecopodinae
- Genus: Pseudophyllanax
- Species: P. imperialis

Binomial name
- Pseudophyllanax imperialis Montrouzier, 1862

Synonyms
- Locusta imperialis Montrouzier, 1862; Platyphyllum giganteum Warion, 1870; Pseudophyllanax insularis Walker, 1869

= Pseudophyllanax imperialis =

Species of katydid

Pseudophyllanax imperialis is a species of large orthopteran belonging to the family Tettigoniidae. It is native to New Caledonia
