= Bohemiatupus =

Bohemiatupus Temporal range: Westphalian

Scientific classification
- Domain: Eukaryota
- Kingdom: Animalia
- Phylum: Arthropoda
- Class: Insecta
- Order: †Meganisoptera
- Family: †Meganeuridae
- Genus: †Bohemiatupus
- Species: †B. elegans

Binomial name
- †Bohemiatupus elegans Prokop & Nel, 2010

Extinct genus of dragonfly-like insects

Bohemiatupus is an extinct genus of griffinfly in the family Meganeuridae and which contains a single species Bohemiatupus elegans. The species is known only from the Late Carboniferous, Bolsovian stage, Kladno Formation near the village of Radnice in the Radnice Basin, Czech Republic.

== History and classification ==
Bohemiatupus elegans is known only from one fossil, the holotype, specimen number "M00485" which is composed of an isolated fore-wing and hind-wing. The wings are preserved as a negative imprint fossil in a sedimentary tuff. The fossil specimen is from outcrops of the Kladno Formation exposed in the Ovčín opencast mine. Bohemiatupus elegans is the first described occurrence of large griffinflies found in the continental basins of the Bohemian Massif. The type specimen is currently preserved in the collections housed in the West Bohemian Museum, located in Plzeň, Czech Republic. Bohemiatupus was first studied by Jakub Prokop of Charles University in Prague, Czech Republic and André Nel of the Muséum national d'histoire naturelle in Paris, France. Their 2008 type description of the genus and species was published in the journal Annales de la Société Entomologique de France. The generic name was coined by Prokop and Nel from a combination of the "Bohemia" in reference to the historical central European region and the meganeurid genus Tupus to which Bohemiatupus is related. The etymology of the specific epithet elegans is Latin and refers to the "magnificent state of preservation" displayed by the holotype.

The ecosystem in which Bohemiatupus elegans lived is interpreted as a shallow lake that developed into a peat-mire due to sediment infill from volcanic ash during the Bolsovian. Bohemiatupus elegans shared this environment with the notably large insect species Bojophlebia prokopi and Carbotriplura kukalovae, which were described from the Kladno Formation earlier.

== Description ==
The holotype wings are mostly complete with the apical section of the fore-wing folded and indistinct while only the basal section of the hind-wing is present. The wings shows no indications of any color pattering that may have been present in life and are interpreted to have been hyaline in nature. The preserved segment of the fore-wing is 115 millimetres (4.5 in) giving an estimated full length for the wing of approximately 260 millimetres (10 in). An adult Bohemiatupus elegans would have had a full wingspan of around 520 millimetres (20 in). The overall size larger than the 150 millimetres (5.9 in) wingspan of the older species Oligotypus huangheensis. However this is still smaller than other members of the subfamily such as Meganeuropsis permiana which is noted for a wingspan exceeding 700 millimetres (28 in). Several key vein structure features present in the fore-wing show Bohemiatupus elegans to be a member of the meganeurid subfamily Tupinae close to the genus Tupus. The AA1 vein possesses several rearward branches, and the CuP vein has a number of concave branches, while the braces CuP and CuA are oblique but not fused into a single vein. Overall the hind-wing is distinctly wider in the cubito-anal area than that of Tupus, where the hind and fore wings are similar in width. B. elegans can be separated from other genera in the subfamily by various aspects of the fine vein structuring in the wing.
