= Yanghugou Formation =

Geologic formation in China

- Stratigraphic range: Westphalian
- Type: Geological formation
- Underlies: Taiyuan Formation
- Overlies: Jingyuan Formation

Location
- Region: Ningxia
- Country: China

The Yanghugou Formation, also known as the Tupo Formation, is a mid-late Carboniferous formation from China. It contains the Xiaheyan locality, a lagerstätte preserving numerous insects.

== Paleobiota ==
After Wang et al. (2022)

=== Arthropods ===
Arthropods
Genus	Species	Higher taxon	Notes	Images
Aseripterella	A. sinensis	Erasipteridae	Name is an anagram of Erasipterella's	
Brodioptera	B. sinensis	Brodiopteridae (Megasecoptera)	Known from several specimens, including some likely freshly-emerged imagoes/subimagoes, alongside likely having sensory setae on its wings	
Chenxiella	C. liuae	Archaeorthoptera	Similar to “lobeattids”, specifically Sinopteron	
Ctenoptilus	C. frequens	Ctenoptilidae (Archaeorthoptera)	Likely omnivorous and laid its eggs in the ground, based on mandible and ovipositor anatomy	
Dictyoptera indet.	Unapplicable	Polyneoptera	Contains three unnamed “roachoid” species, which are distinct from the two named species but have too little material to be named themselves	
Erasipterella	E. jini	Erasipteridae	Synonymous with the genus “Sinierasiptera”	E. jini fossil
Gulou	G. carpenteri	Plecoptera	Earliest known stonefly fossil	Fossil of Gulou
Haidilaozhen	H. cuiae	Haidilaozhenidae (Odonatoptera)	Convergently evolved wings similar to damselflies	
Heterologus	H. duyiwuer	Archaeorthoptera		
Kinklidoblatta	K. youhei	Dictyoptera incertae sedis	Indeterminate family	
Longzhua	L. loculata	Archaeorthoptera	Carnivorous and predatory, likely related to cnemidolestodeans	
Miamia	M. maimai	Archaeorthoptera	Species name is both an anagram of the genus and translated to “buried veins”	Fossils of M. maimai
Namuroningxia	N. elegans	Namuroningxiidae (Palaeodictyoptera)	Wing venation resembles several distinct clades of palaeopteran insects	
Namuroptera	N. minuta	Aykhalidae (Megasecoptera)	Relatively small	
Oligotypus	O. huangheensis	Paralogidae	Synonymous with the monotypic genus “Sinomeganeura”	O. huangheensis fossil
Phtanomiamia	P. gui	Archaeorthoptera	Similar to Miamia	
Protomiamia	P. yangi	Archaeorthoptera	Similar to “lobeattids”, male is smaller than the female	
Qilianiblatta	Q. namuriensis	Phylloblattidae? (Eoblattodea)	Earliest known dictyopteran	
Shenzhousia	S. qilianshanensis	Meganeuridae	A griffinfly with single wing length about 16 cm	
Sinodiapha	S. ramosa	Sinodiaphidae (Megasecopteromorpha)	An unusual transitional form between Megasecoptera and Diaphanopterodea	
Sinodunbaria	S. jarmilae	Spilapteridae	Known from a nearly complete fossil, has dark wings with light banding	
Sinoerasipteron	S. xiaheyanensis	Erasipteridae	Known from a partial forewing	
Sinogerarus	S. pectinatus	Archaeorthoptera	Similar to Gerarus, but only known from a partial forewing	
Sinonamuropteris	S. ningxianensis	Grylloblattodea	Synonymised with several other species and three separate genera	
Sinopalaeopteryx	S. olivieri, S. splendens	Aykhalidae (Megasecoptera)		
Sinopteron	S. huangheense	Archaeorthoptera	Higher clade within Archaeorthoptera indeterminate	
Sylphalula	S. laliquei	Erasipteridae	Known from a poorly preserved specimen, but has unusually few wing veins and is quite small	
Tupus	T. orientalis	Meganeuridae	Formerly included in its own genus, “Paragilsonia”	Drawing of Tupus permianus
Tytthospilaptera	T. wangae	Spilapteridae	Smallest palaeodictyopteran known, with a wingspan of around 2 cm	
Xiaheyanella	X. orta	Calvertiellidae (Palaeodictyoptera)	Earliest calvertiellid, yet still has some of their derived wing venation characters	
Xixia	X. huban	Cnemidolestodea (Archaeorthoptera)	Has an unusual pattern of dark patches on its wings	
Carbolohmannia	C. maimaiphilus	Mixonomata (Oribatida)	Earliest phoretic mite known, phoretic on the insect Miamia maimai	
Laevitealliocaris	L. xiaheyanensis	Tealliocarididae (Pygocephalomorpha)	First tealliocaridid from outside Europe or America	Reconstruction of Tealliocaris etheridgii from Scotland

=== Other Organisms ===
Other Organisms
Genus	Species	Higher taxon	Notes	Images
Huanghelepis	H. pani	Palaeonisciformes		
Ningxiaplatysomus	N. parvus	Platysomiformes (Actinopterygii)		
Zhongweilepis	Z. macilentus	Palaeonisciformes	Resembles both Chondrostei and Holostei	
Nudasporestrobus	N. ningxicus	Lepidodendrales	Likely a Sigillaria cone	Restoration of Sigillaria
