= Wingspan =

Distance between wingtips

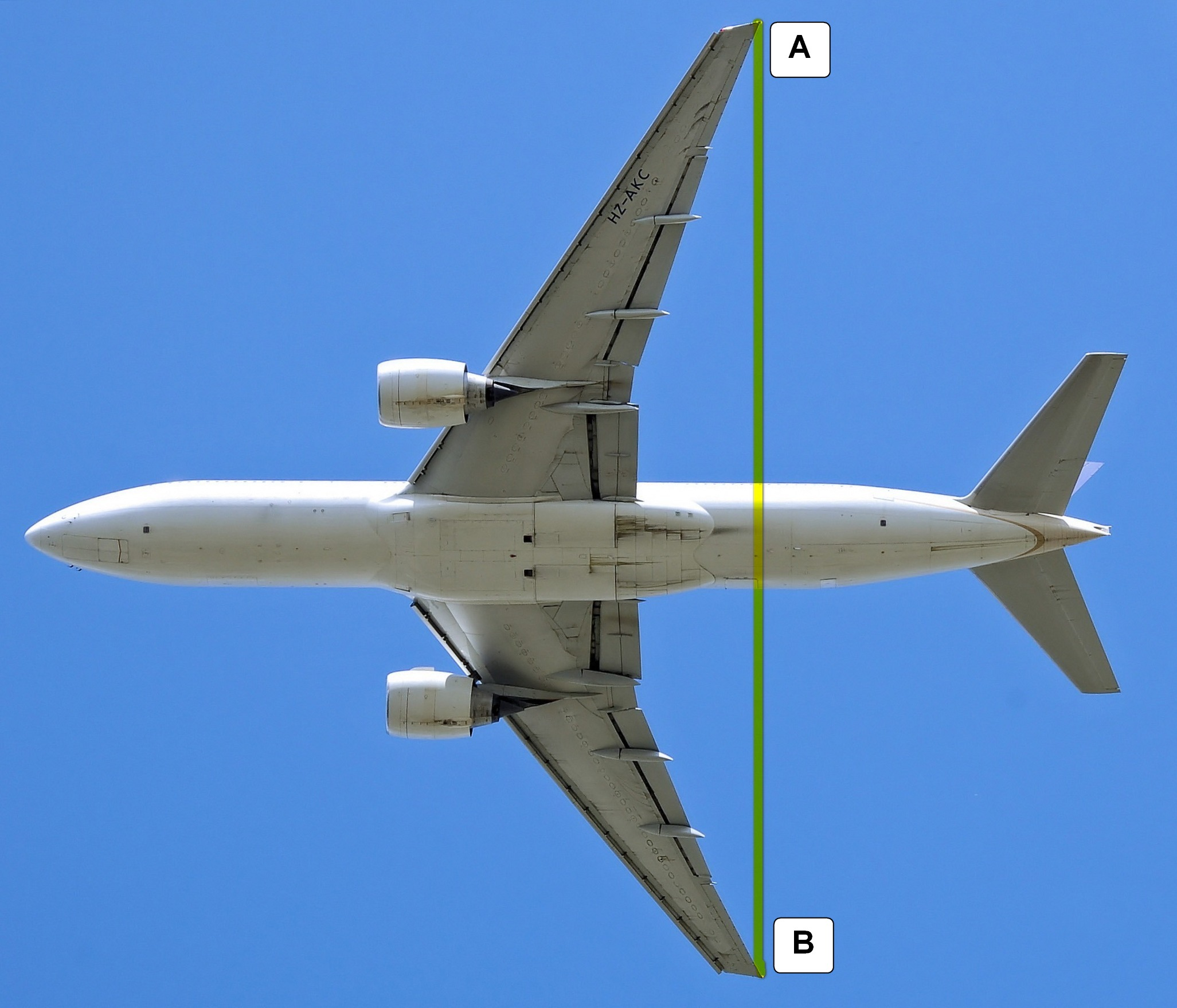
The distance A to B is the wingspan of this Boeing 777-200ER

The wingspan (or just span) of a bird or an airplane is the distance from one wingtip to the opposite wingtip. For example, the Boeing 777–200 has a wingspan of 60.93 meters (199 ft 11 in), and a wandering albatross (Diomedea exulans) caught in 1965 had a wingspan of 3.63 meters (11 ft 11 in), the official record for a living bird. The term wingspan, more technically 'extent', is also used for other winged animals such as pterosaurs, bats, insects, etc., and other aircraft such as ornithopters. In humans, the term wingspan also refers to the arm span, which is the distance between the length from the end of an individual's arm (measured at the fingertips) to the individual's fingertips on the other arm when raised parallel to the ground at shoulder height.

== Wingspan of aircraft ==
The wingspan of an aircraft is always measured in a straight line, from wingtip to wingtip, regardless of wing shape or sweep.

=== Implications for aircraft design and animal evolution ===
The lift from wings is proportional to their area, so the heavier the animal or aircraft the bigger that area must be. The area is the product of the span times the width (mean chord) of the wing, so either a long, narrow wing or a shorter, broader wing will support the same mass. For efficient steady flight, the ratio of span to chord, the aspect ratio, should be as high as possible (the constraints are usually structural) because this lowers the lift-induced drag associated with the inevitable wingtip vortices. Long-ranging birds, like albatrosses, and most commercial aircraft maximize aspect ratio. Alternatively, animals and aircraft which depend on maneuverability (fighters, predators and prey, as well as those who live amongst trees and bushes, insect catchers, etc.) need to be able to roll fast to turn, and the high moment of inertia of long narrow wings, as well as the high angular drag and quick balancing of aileron lift with wing lift at a low rotation rate, produce lower roll rates. For them, short-span, broad wings are preferred. Additionally, ground handling in aircraft is a significant problem for very high aspect ratios and flying animals may encounter similar issues.

The highest aspect ratio of man-made wings are aircraft propellers, in their most extreme form as helicopter rotors.

== Wingspan of flying animals ==
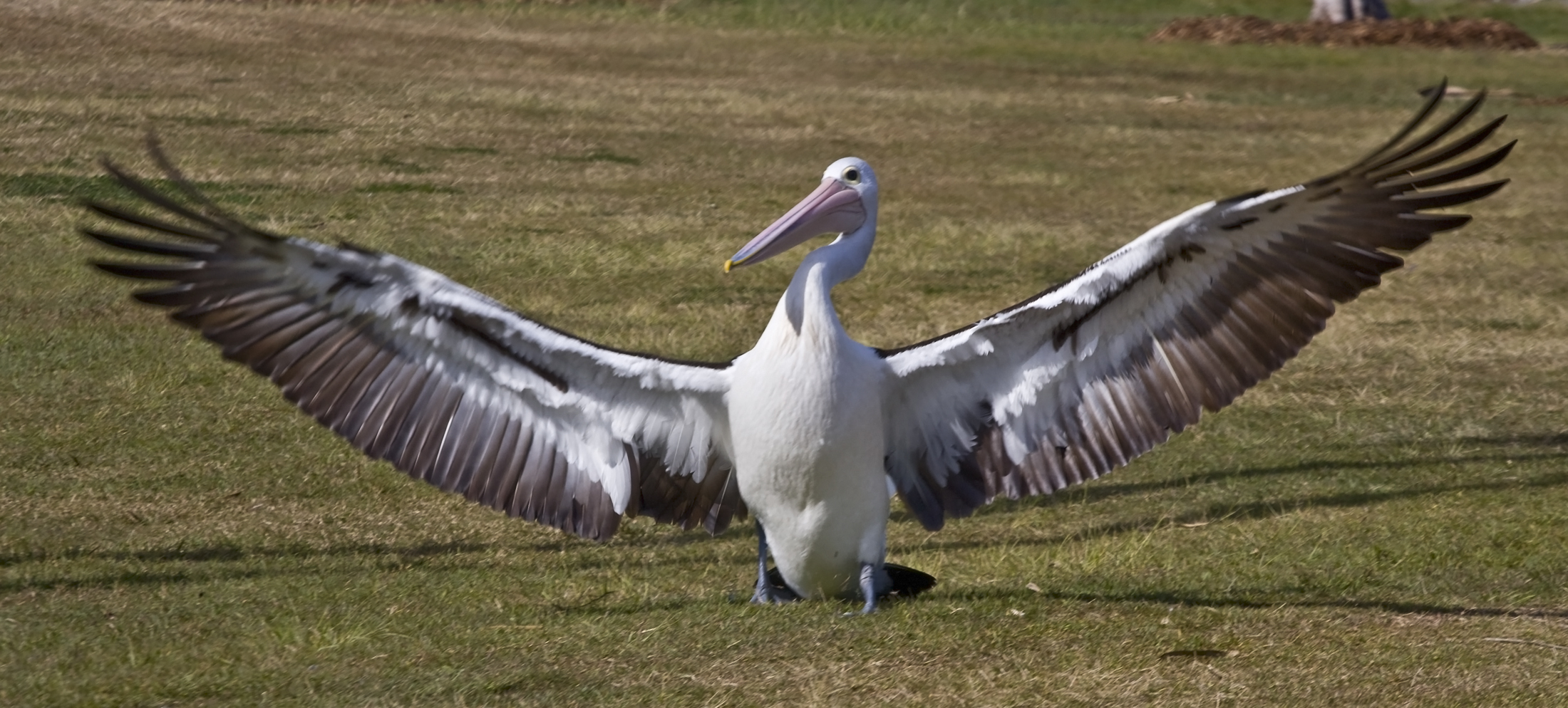
Pelican wingspan

To measure the wingspan of a bird, a live or freshly-dead specimen is placed flat on its back, the wings are grasped at the wrist joints and the distance is measured between the tips of the longest primary feathers on each wing.

The wingspan of an insect refers to the wingspan of pinned specimens, and may refer to the distance between the centre of the thorax and the apex of the wing doubled or to the width between the apices with the wings set with the trailing wing edge perpendicular to the body.

== Wingspan in sports ==
In basketball and gridiron football, a fingertip-to-fingertip measurement is used to determine the player's wingspan, also called armspan. This is called reach in boxing terminology. The wingspan of 16-year-old BeeJay Anya, a top basketball Junior Class of 2013 prospect who played for the NC State Wolfpack, was officially measured at 7 feet 9 inches (2.36 m) across, one of the longest of all National Basketball Association draft prospects, and the longest ever for a non-7-foot player, though Anya went undrafted in 2017. The wingspan of Manute Bol, at 8 feet 6 inches (2.59 m), is (as of 2013) the longest in NBA history, and his vertical reach was 10 feet 5 inches (3.18 m).

== Wingspan records ==
=== Largest wingspan ===
- Aircraft: Scaled Composites Stratolaunch — 117 m (383 ft 10 in)
- Bat: Large flying fox – 1.5 m (4 ft 11 in)
- Bird
  - Extant: Wandering albatross – 3.63 m (11 ft 11 in)
  - Extinct: Pelagornis – Approximately 6.06–7.38 m (19 ft 11 in – 24 ft 3 in)
- Insect
  - Extant: White witch moth – 28.6 cm (11.3 in)
  - Extinct: Meganeuropsis (Griffinfly, relative of dragonflies) – Approximately 71 cm (2 ft 4 in)
- Reptile: Hatzegopteryx (Azhdarchid pterosaur) – Approximately 10–12 m (32 ft 10 in – 39 ft 4 in)

=== Smallest wingspan ===
- Aircraft
  - Biplane: Starr Bumble Bee II – 1.68 m (5 ft 6 in)
  - Jet: Bede BD-5 – 4.27 m (14 ft 0 in)
  - Twin engine: Colomban Cri-cri – 4.9 m (16 ft 1 in)
- Bat: Bumblebee bat – 16 cm (6.3 in)
- Bird: Bee hummingbird – 6.5 cm (2.6 in)
- Insect: Tanzanian parasitic wasp (Fairyfly) – 0.2 mm (0.0079 in)
- Reptile: Nemicolopterus (Tapejaromorph pterosaur) – Approximately 25 cm (10 in)

== See also ==
- List of large aircraft
- List of largest birds
- Largest living flying birds by wingspan
- List of largest insects
- Pterosaur size
