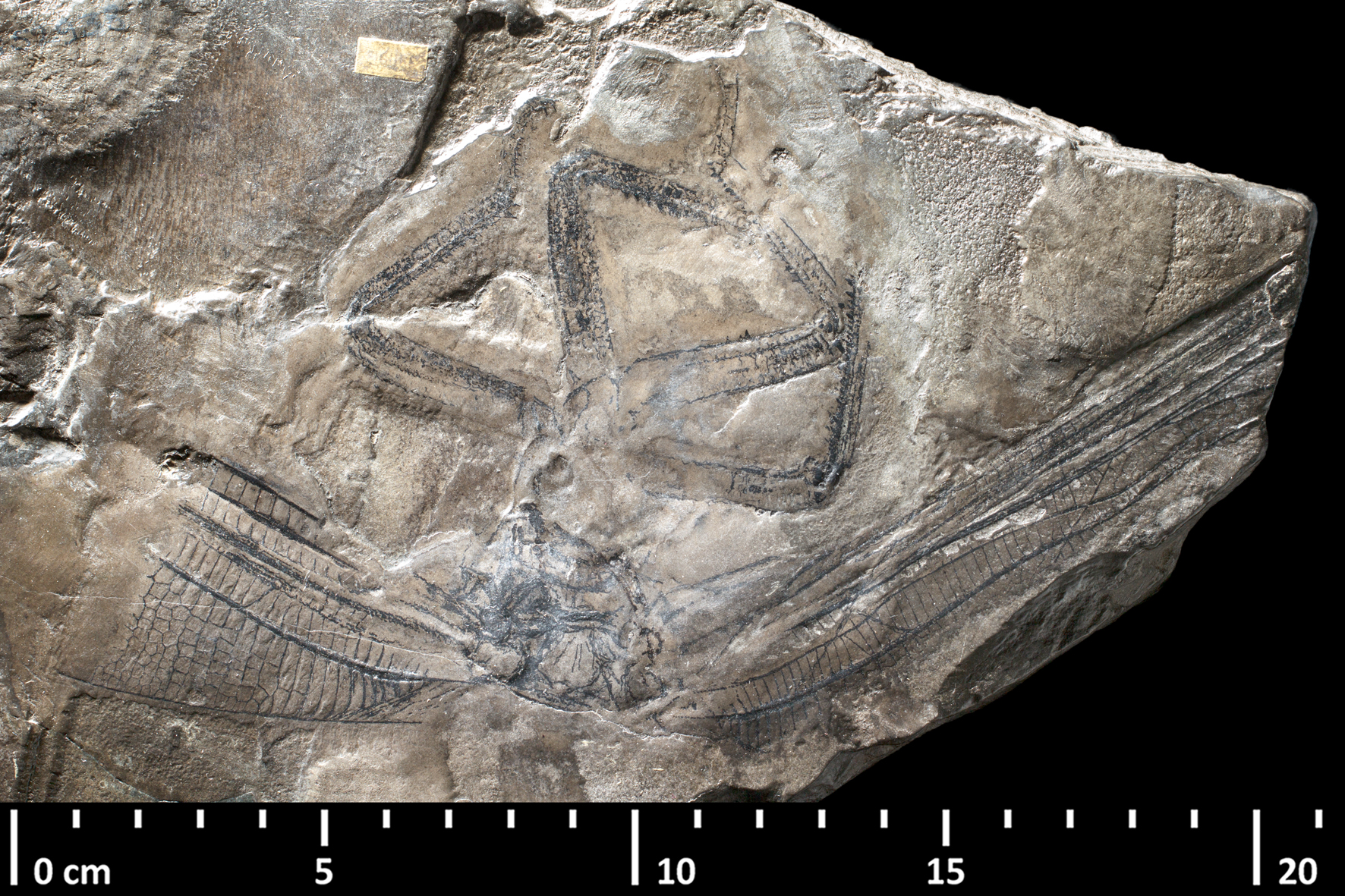
- Fossil of Meganeura monyi
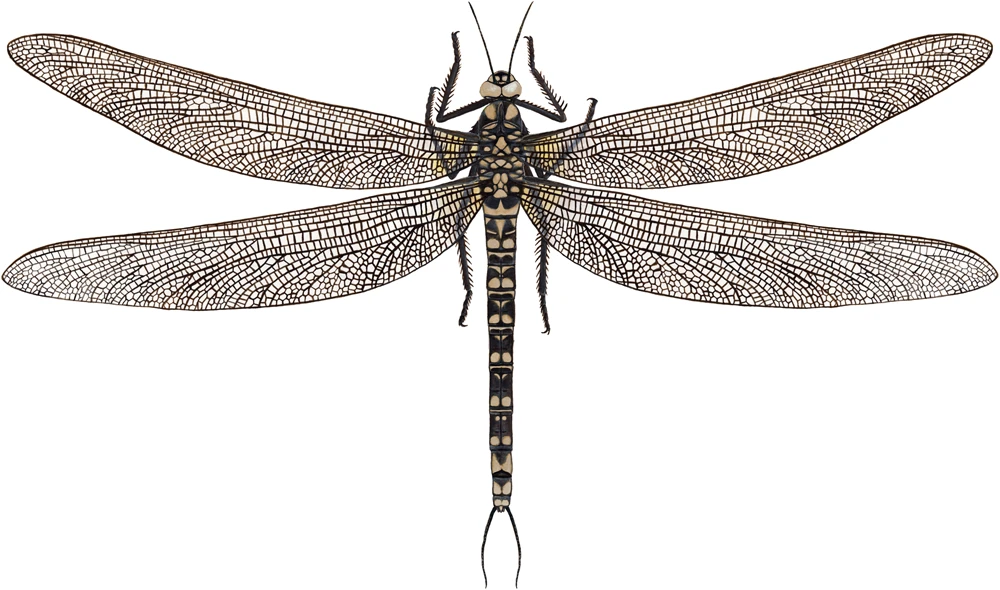
- Life restoration of Meganeurites gracilipes

Scientific classification
- Kingdom: Animalia
- Phylum: Arthropoda
- Class: Insecta
- Order: †Meganisoptera
- Family: †Meganeuridae; Handlirsch, 1906

= Meganeuridae =

Meganeuridae Temporal range: Pennsylvanian–Roadian

Extinct genus of dragonfly-like insects

Meganeuridae, from Ancient Greek μέγας (mégas), meaning "large", and νεῦρον (neûron), meaning "nerve", is an extinct family of griffenflies (order Meganisoptera). There are more than 20 genera and 50 described species in Meganeuridae. This family contains the genera Meganeura and Meganeuropsis, which are two of the largest known insects.

== Genera ==
These genera belong to the family Meganeuridae:

=== Subfamily Carpentertypinae ===
- Carpentertypus Zessin, 1983

=== Subfamily Meganeurinae ===
- Meganeura Brongniart, 1885
- Meganeuropsis Carpenter, 1939
- Meganeurula Handlirsch, 1906

=== Subfamily Piesbergtupinae ===
- Piesbergtupus Zessin, 2006

=== Subfamily Tupinae ===
- Arctotypus Martynov, 1932
- Bohemiatupus Prokop & Nel, 2010
- Boltonites Handlirsch, 1919
- Curvitupus Nel, Fleck, Garrouste, Gand, Lapeyrie, Bybee & Prokop, 2009
- Ephemerites Geinitz, 1865
- Gallotupus Nel, Garrouste & Roques, 2008
- Gilsonia Meunier, 1908
- Meganeurina Handlirsch, 1919
- Meganeurites Handlirsch, 1919
- Megatypus Tillyard, 1925
- Nannotupus Nel, Fleck, Garrouste, Gand, Lapeyrie, Bybee & Prokop, 2009
- Oligotypus? Carpenter, 1931 (may belong to Paralogidae)
- Permotupus Nel, Fleck, Garrouste, Gand, Lapeyrie, Bybee & Prokop, 2009
- Petrotypus Zalesskii, 1950
- Shenzhousia? Zhang & Hong, 2006
- Stephanotypus Zessin, 1983
- Tupus Sellards, 1906

=== Incertae sedis ===
- Gallotupus Nel, Garrouste, & Roques, 2008

== Gallery ==
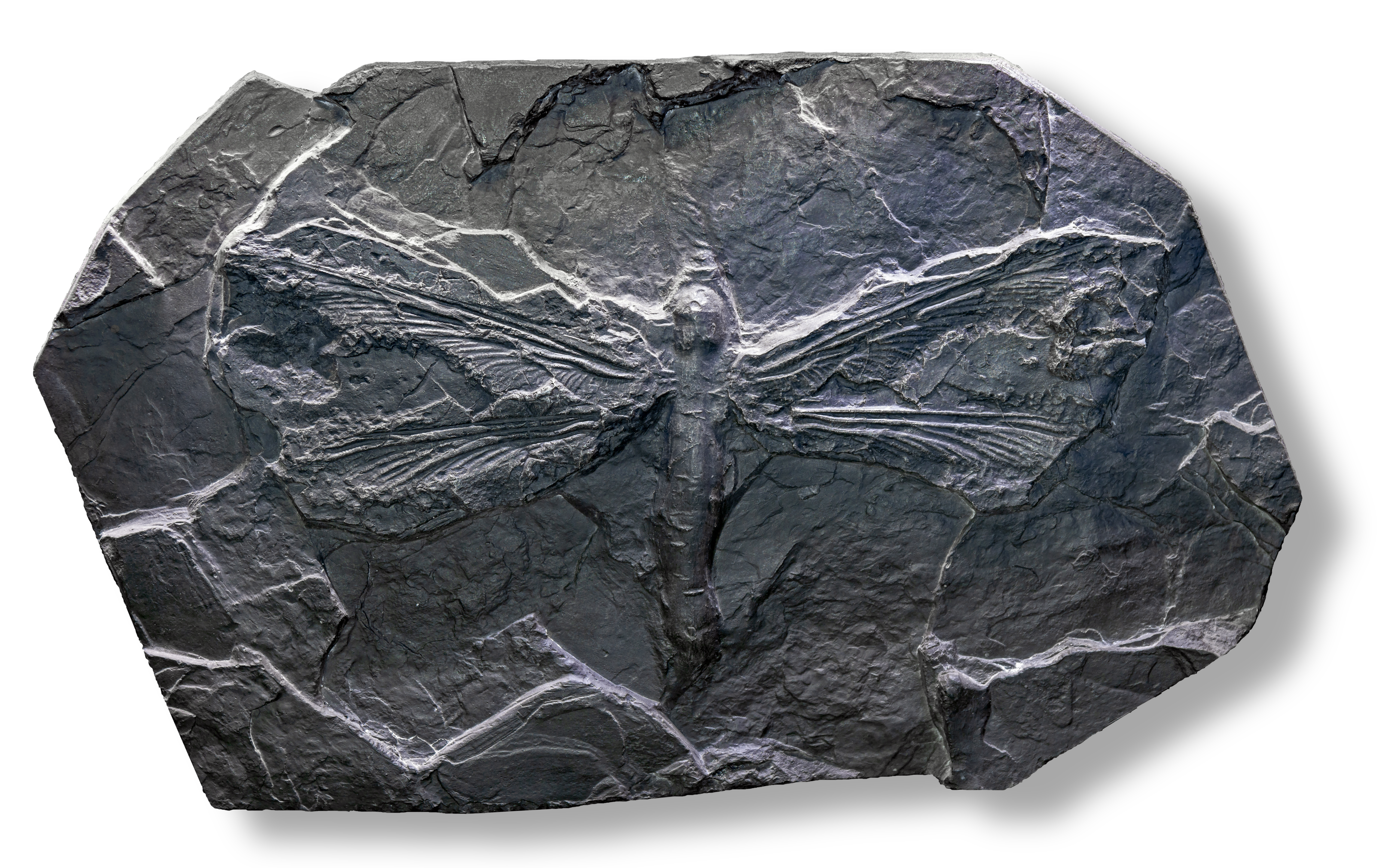
Arctotypus intermedius (often erroneously considered a fossil of Meganeura)

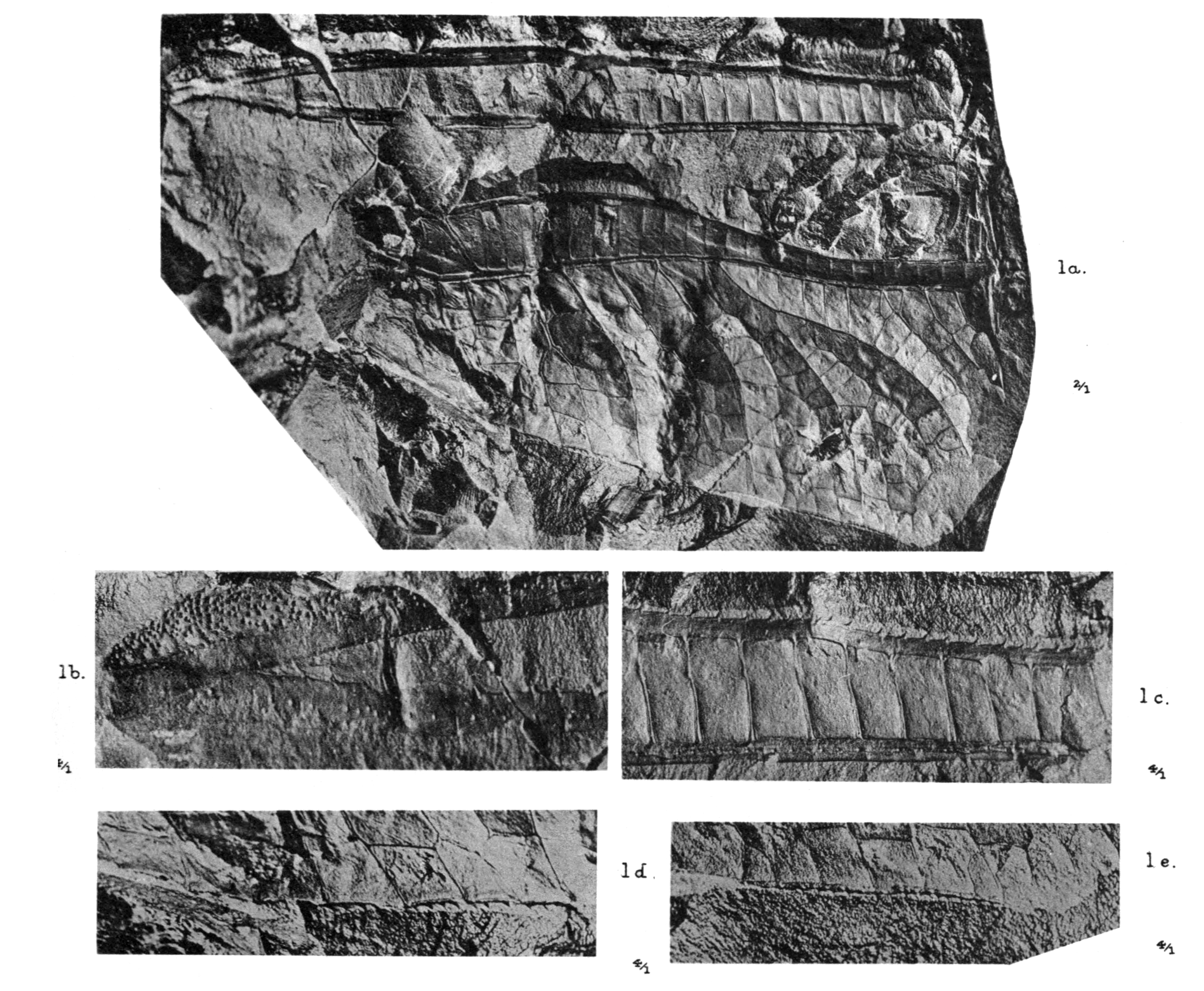
Boltonites radstockensis

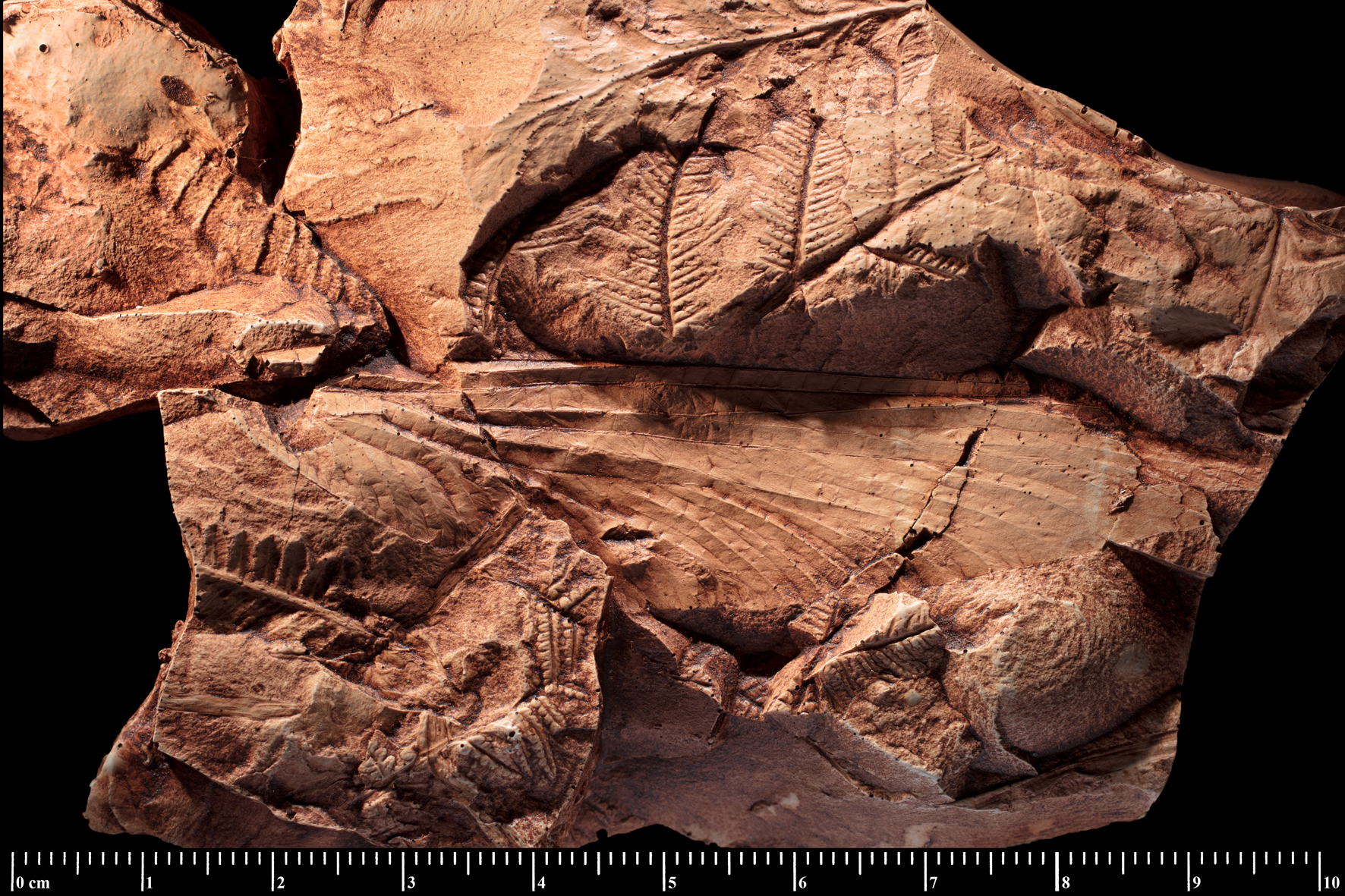
Gallotupus oudardi

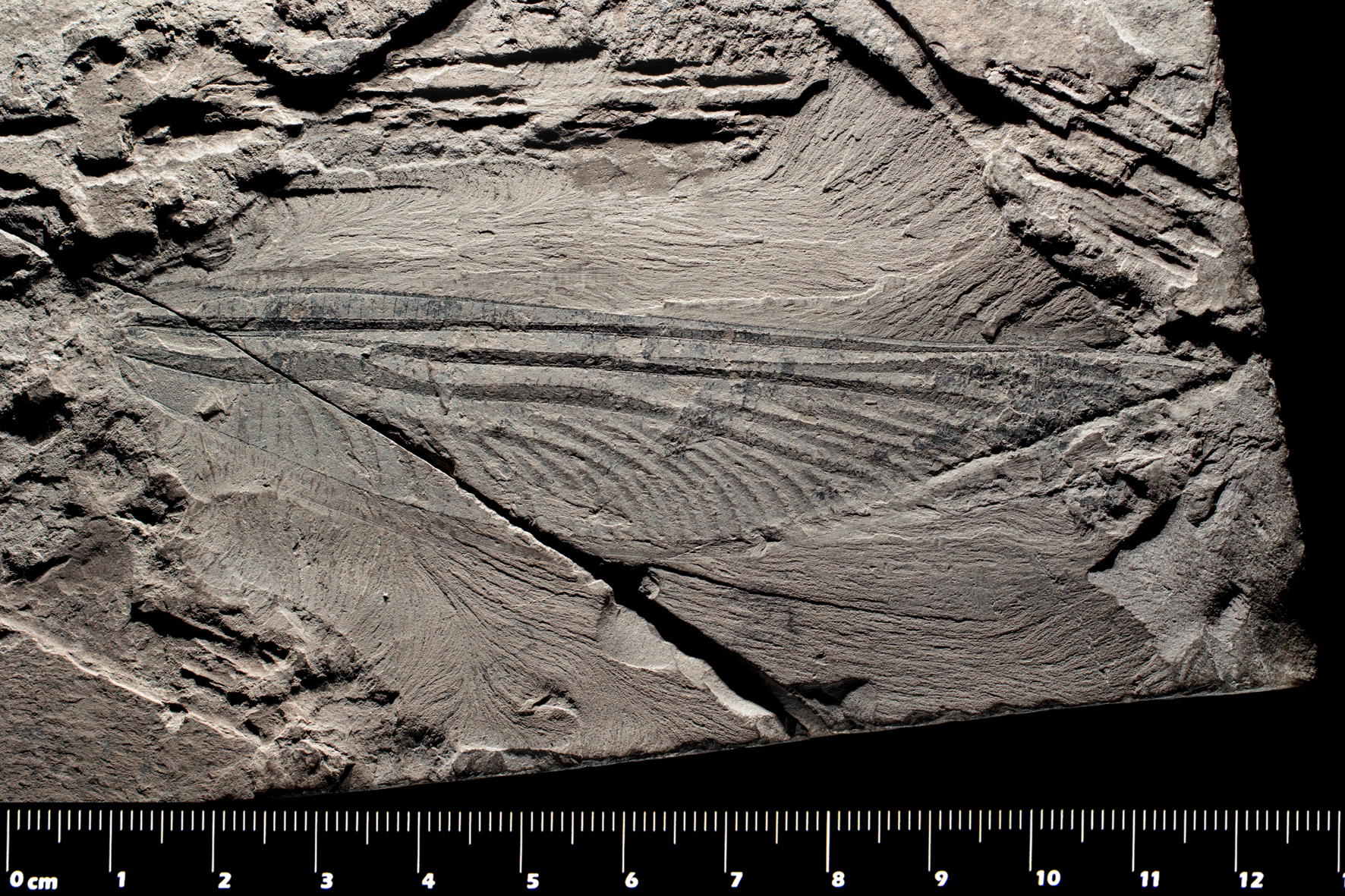
Gilsonia titana

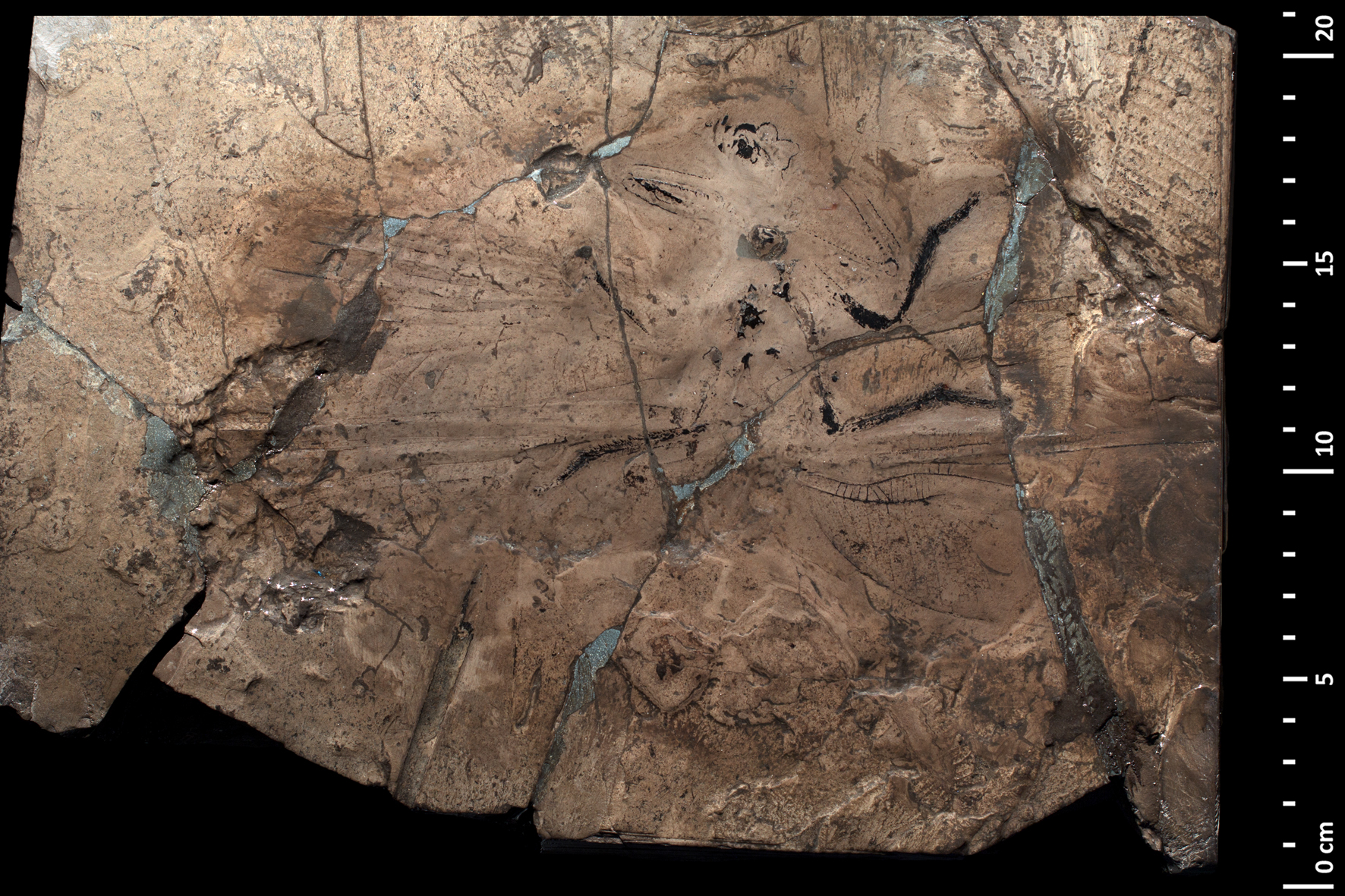
Meganeurina confusa

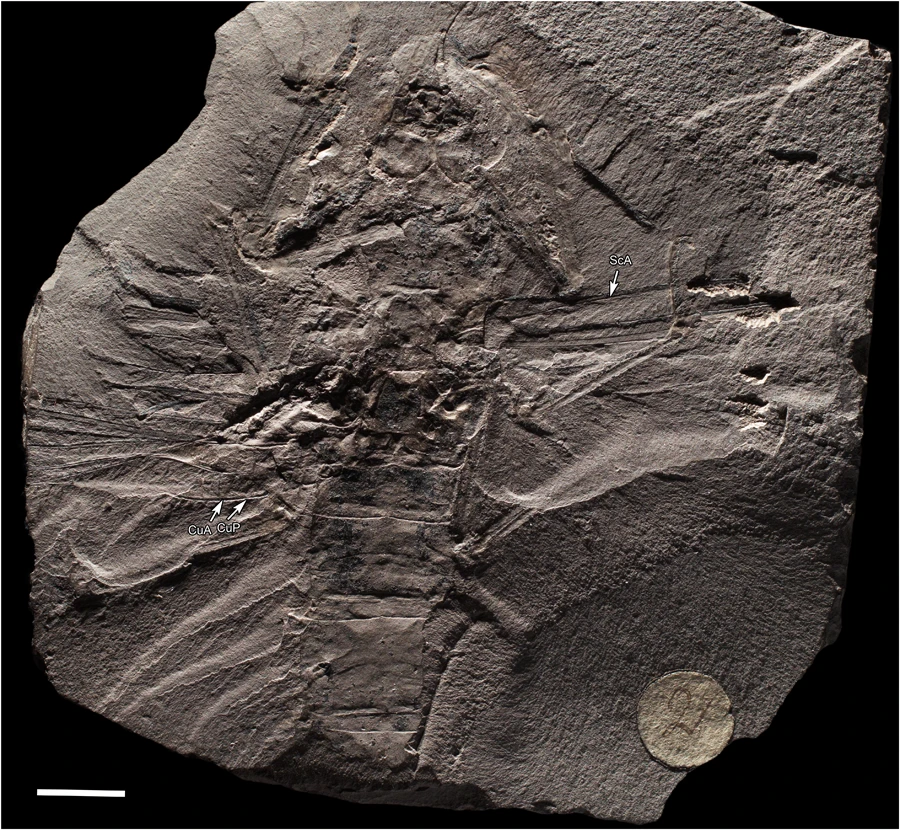
Meganeurites gracilipes

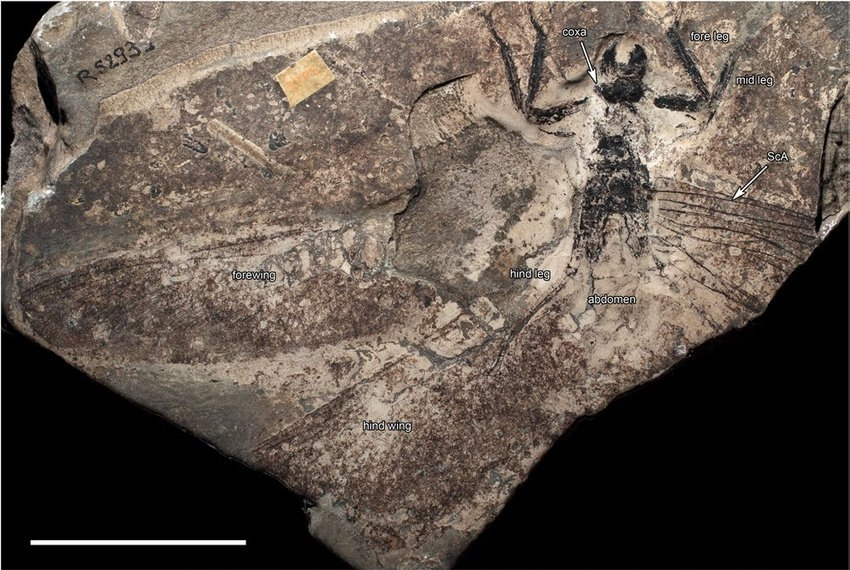
Meganeurula selysii

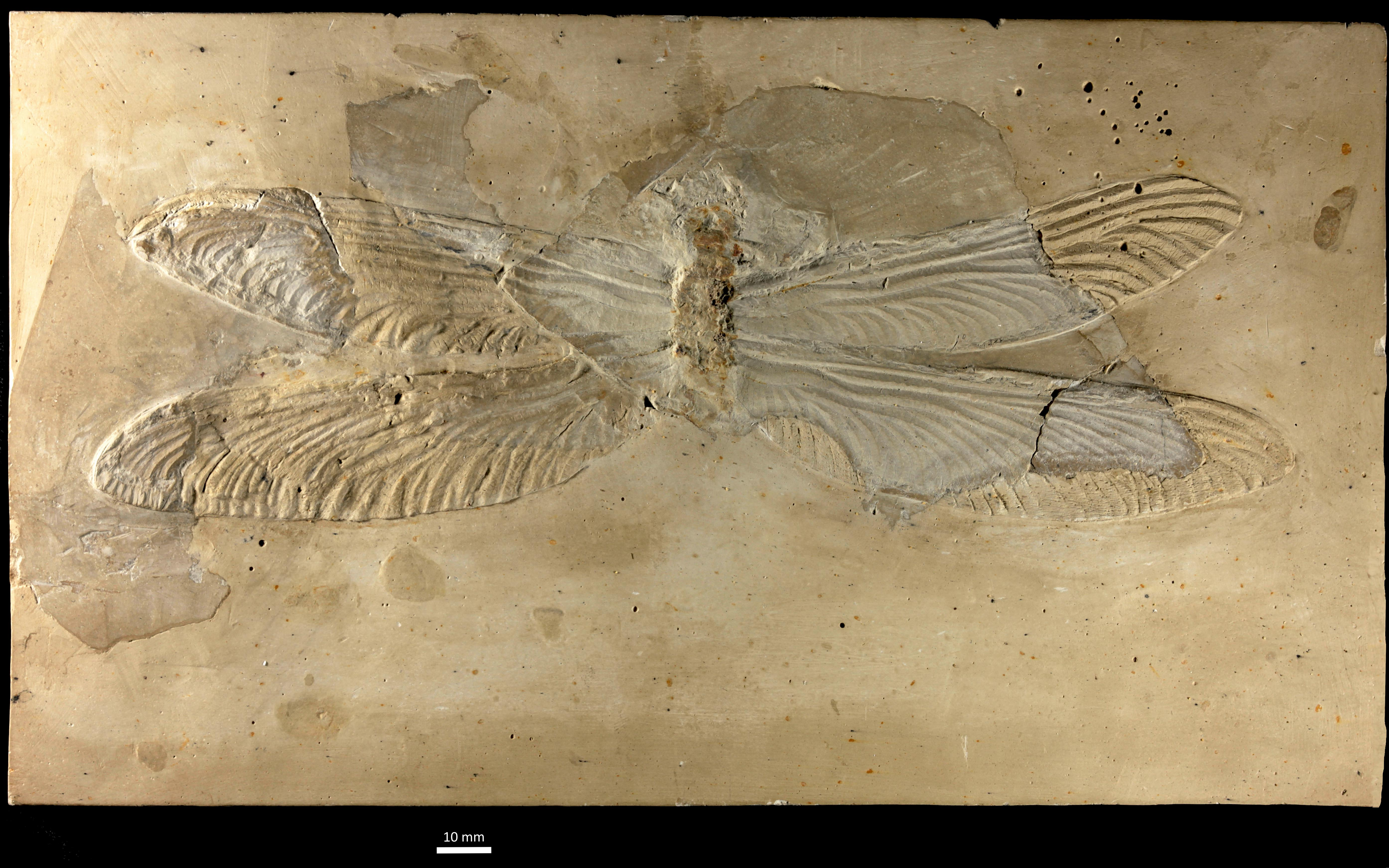
Tupus permianus
