= Bojophlebia =

Bojophlebia Temporal range: Pennsylvanian

Scientific classification
- Kingdom: Animalia
- Phylum: Arthropoda
- Clade: Pancrustacea
- Class: Insecta
- Subclass: Pterygota
- Infraclass: Hydropalaeoptera
- Family: †Bojophlebiidae; Kukalová-Peck, 1985
- Genus: †Bojophlebia; Kukalová-Peck, 1985
- Species: †B. prokopi

Binomial name
- †Bojophlebia prokopi Kukalová-Peck, 1985

Extinct species of winged insect

Bojophlebia is an extinct genus of winged insect from the Pennsylvanian period of the Czech Republic. It includes only a single species, Bojophlebia prokopi, and is the only member of the family Bojophlebiidae. Bojophlebia prokopi was first described in 1985 by Jarmila Kukalová-Peck, who originally described it as a large mayfly-like insect. This original interpretation has since been rejected. Most recently, B. prokopi has been treated as a member of the infraclass Hydropalaeoptera, which also includes the Odonatoptera (dragonflies, damselflies and extinct relatives) and Panephemeroptera (mayflies and extinct relatives). Bojophlebia is considered a sister group of all other members of the Hydropalaeoptera. A fossil that was described as a nymph of Bojophlebia is now considered to be a separate taxon, Carbotriplura kukalovae. The original description interpreted structures such as eyes and antennae, however these structures cannot be confirmed after restudy, although this may be an example of over-interpretation by Kukalová-Peck, as has happened with other extinct insects such as Carbotriplura and Gerarus.

== Etymology ==
The genus name Bojophlebia is derived from the Celtic tribe Boii (spelled "Bojos" in the original description for the genus), after whom the historical region Bohemia was named. The species epithet, prokopi, is in honor of Dr. Rudolf Prokop, a friend of the author.

== Phylogeny ==
The below phylogeny is based on the phylogenetic analysis by Sroka et al. (2015). Within Hydropalaeoptera, Bojophlebiidae is the sister group to the clade formed by Odonatoptera and Panephemeroptera, named Euhydropalaeoptera.

- Dicondylia
  - Zygentoma
  - Paranotalia
    - †Carbotriplurida
    - Pterygota
      - Neopterygota
        - †Palaeodictyopterida
        - Neoptera
      - Hydropalaeoptera
        - †Bojophlebiidae
        - Euhydropalaeoptera
          - Odonatoptera
          - Panephemeroptera
