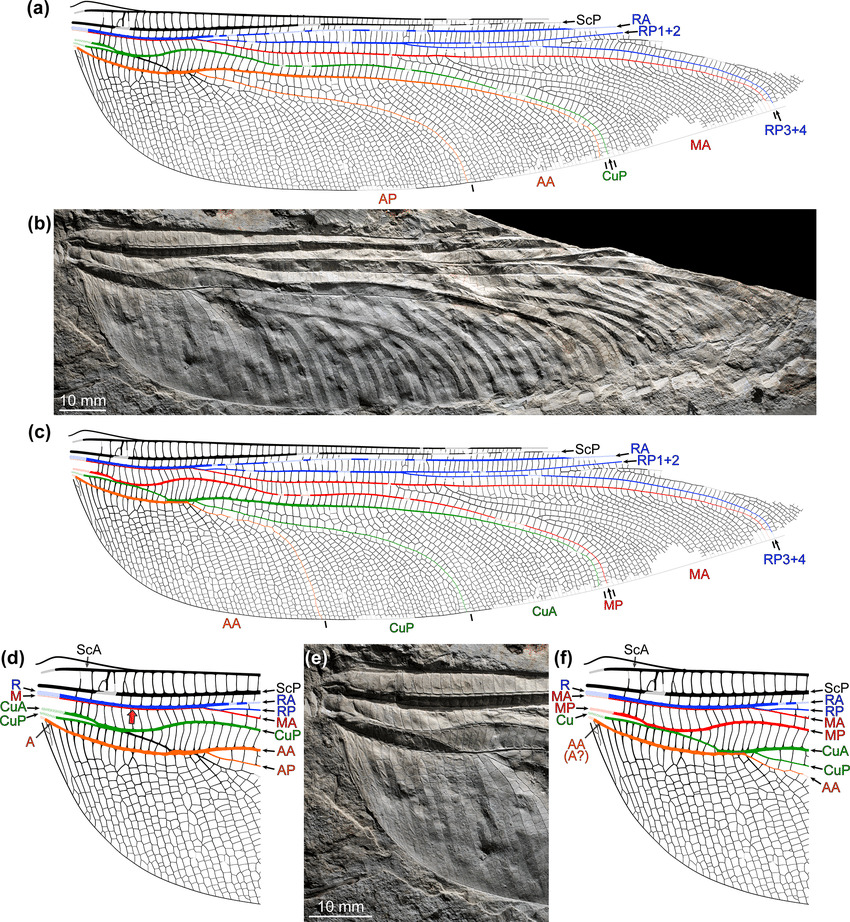
- Megatypus schucherti

Scientific classification
- Domain: Eukaryota
- Kingdom: Animalia
- Phylum: Arthropoda
- Class: Insecta
- Order: †Meganisoptera
- Family: †Meganeuridae
- Genus: †Megatypus

Species
- †M. ingentissimus; †M. parvus; †M. schucherti; †M. vetustus

= Megatypus =

Megatypus Temporal range: Lower Permian

Extinct genus of griffinflies

Megatypus is an extinct genus of insect of the order Meganisoptera. Species in this genus were much larger than their modern relatives, dragonflies and damselflies, its single wing length is 19.5 cm (7.7 in).
