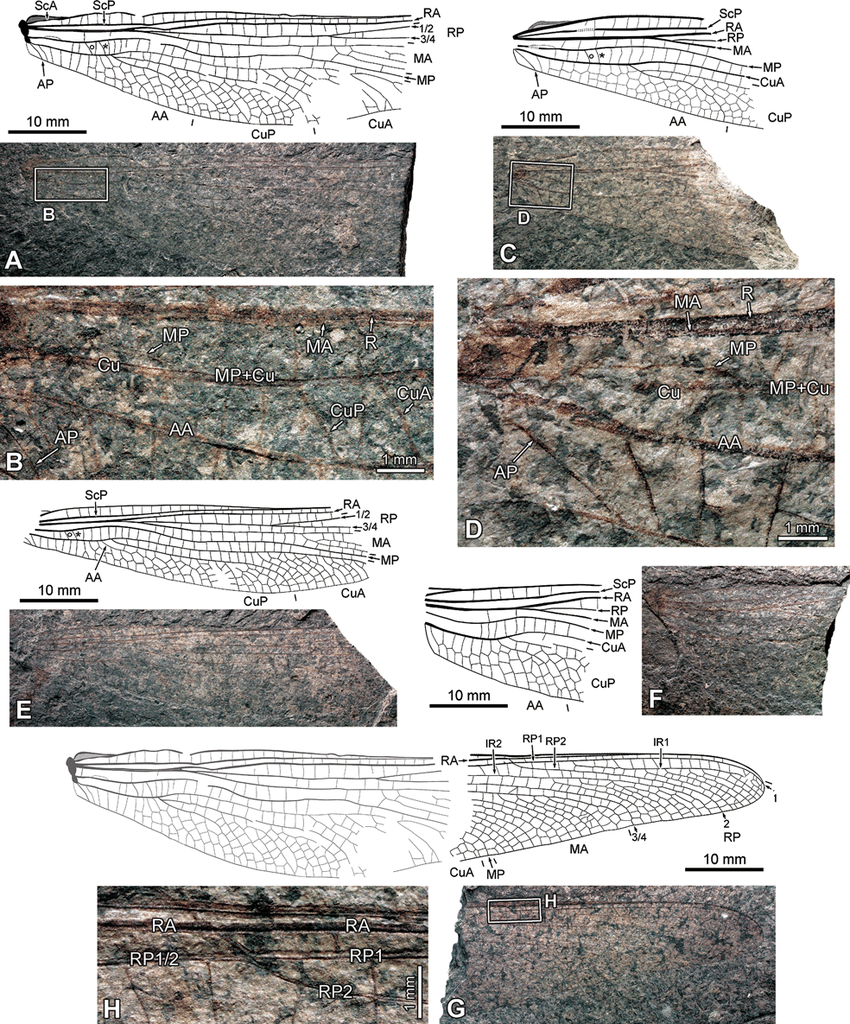
- Specimens of Oligotypus (=Sinomeganeura) huangheensis

Scientific classification
- Kingdom: Animalia
- Phylum: Arthropoda
- Class: Insecta
- Order: †Meganisoptera
- Family: †Paralogidae
- Genus: †Oligotypus; Carpenter, 1931

Other species
- O. tillyardi Carpenter, 1931 (type); O. makowskii Carpenter & Richardson, 1971; O. huangheensis Ren, Nel & Prokop, 2008; O. tuscaloosae Beckemeyer & Engel, 2011

Synonyms
- Sinomeganeura Ren, Nel & Prokop, 2008

= Oligotypus =

Oligotypus Temporal range: Namurian-Early Permian

Extinct genus of dragonfly-like insects

Oligotypus is an extinct genus of griffinfly in the family Paralogidae. This genus is known from 4 species from the Carboniferous to Permian.

== Species ==
Type species of the genus, Oligotypus tillyardi was described from lower Permian site in Kansas and Midco insect bed in Oklahoma. It was small griffinfly with wing length of 4 centimetres (1.6 in) as preserved.

Second species, O. makowskii was described from middle Pennsylvanian Francis Creek Shale in Illinois. It had wing which is 6.5 centimetres (2.6 in) long as preserved and estimated to have complete length of 9 centimetres (3.5 in).

Third species, O. huangheensis was described from Pennsylvanian, Namurian stage, Yanghugou Formation (previously called as Tupo Formation) near the village of Xiaheyan in Ningxia Hui Autonomous Region, China. It was originally described under its own genus Sinomeganeura, but it was synonymized to Oligotypus in 2013. The preserved segment is 48.6 millimetres (1.91 in) giving an estimated full length for the wing of approximately 70 millimetres (2.8 in).

Fourth species, O. tuscaloosae was described from Early Pennsylvanian Pottsville Formation of Alabama. It is the largest species of Oligotypus with preserved wing length of 7.7 centimetres (3.0 in) and estimated complete wing length of 13–16 centimetres (5.1–6.3 in).

== Description ==
According to O. huangheensis, it shows no indications of any color pattering that may have been present in life. In adult of the species would have had a full wingspan of around 150 millimetres (5.9 in). The overall size is considered small compared to other members of the subfamily such as Meganeura and Meganeuropsis, both with wings exceeding 250 millimetres (9.8 in) in length, and wingspans over 700 millimetres (28 in).
