= Carbotriplura =

Carbotriplura Temporal range: Westphalian

Scientific classification
- Kingdom: Animalia
- Phylum: Arthropoda
- Clade: Pancrustacea
- Class: Insecta
- Clade: Dicondylia
- Order: †Carbotriplurida
- Genus: †Carbotriplura; Kluge, 1996
- Species: †C. kukalovae

Binomial name
- †Carbotriplura kukalovae Kluge, 1996

Extinct genus of basal insect

Carbotriplura is a genus of insect from the Carboniferous of the Czech Republic. This genus contains one species, Carbotriplura kukalovae, and is the only genus within the order Carbotriplurida. It was previously interpreted as a nymph of Bojophlebia during the former's description, however this was disproven in 1996 when it was found to be a separate order of apterygote (wingless) insects. A 2014 paper then re-examined it, finding it to be the sister clade to winged insects.

== Description ==
Carbotriplura is a very large insect, reaching over 10 cm in length excluding the tail filaments. Its head is triangular in shape with large lateral (side) eyes. An isolated fragment of the left antenna is preserved, consisting of the scapus, pedicel, and the base of the flagellum with a small fragment further away. The scapus and pedicel are covered in hairs. While the individual segments of the flagellum are not preserved, the structure is at least as long as the rest of the antenna. The mouthparts are not discernible except for a five-segmented maxillary palp, broken between the second and third segments. This palp bears short hairs on the second and third segments, with the rest being progressively thinner. These features show that Carbotriplura likely had a prognathous condition.

Its thoracic segments all bear large, rounded paranotal lobes, each as wide as the notum (back) itself. No tracheae, blood vessels or articulations can be seen within the thorax. The prothorax (forwards part) is much thinner than the meso- and metathorax. Each paranotal lobe is flattened and laterally extended which distinguishes them from the notum, alongside them overlapping the successive lobe. The sternites bear traces of heavy sclerotisation, likely representing coxal cavities.

Carbotriplura's legs are very long and bear short spines on all their podomeres. The bases of the legs are not preserved, with only femora, tibiae and tarsi on all preserved legs. The femora are thickest, although their basal parts are not preserved. The tibiae are the longest of all, likely rectangular in cross-section, with highly sclerotised longitudinal (aligned with the axis) ridges bearing rows of short bristles. While the exact number of segments in the tarsi is unknown, the most likely hypothesis is either a five-segmented tarsus or that each segment is itself segmented, with the only certain segment being the first, most elongated one. The right hind leg bears a single pretarsal claw, and since its insertion point is quite lateral, the animal almost certainly had two of these claws per leg.

The abdomen bears nine pairs of plate-like paratergal lobes, with no articulation or tracheae preserved much like those of the thorax. The anterior margin of each is thickened and in-line with its corresponding segment. Each lobe overlaps the next similar to the thoracic lobes, with them being apically (at the apex) rounded and directed posteriorly. The borders between abdominal sternites are hardly visible. A single abdominal leglet is preserved on the third segment, composed of a basal coxopodite and a distal stylus (similar to those of Archaeognatha or non-insect hexapods), although it lacks terminal claws. Eversible vesicles on the coxae are not preserved, alongside the gonostyli on the ninth segment. The cerci are pointed backwards along with the paracercus, although they are broken at their apexes.

== Interpretation ==
=== Misinterpretations ===
In its original description as a Bojophlebia nymph, several features were either misinterpreted or likely completely imagined. For example, while one antenna and one maxillary palp are preserved, these were interpreted as both antennae composed of nine segments. However the right appendage does not resemble a hexapod antenna at all, and only five segments are present within it. The comparison to syntonopterid nymphs made was also invalid, as the only such fossils are now classed as indeterminate hexapods.

The paranotal lobes were also identified as wings or winglets, but since they lack veins or articulation this is impossible. Furthermore, while in all pterygote nymphs the wing buds face towards the tail, in Carbotriplura the lobes face outwards. Even if these were wing buds, the small size compared to the body would mean the fossil is of an early instar nymph, which does not match with its huge size (the resulting adult would almost certainly be much larger than even Meganeura).

In its original description only four legs were mentioned, however traces of all six can be observed on the fossil. It was claimed to have a tibio-patellar suture like modern mayflies, however no separate patella nor trace of sutures is visible. The femora was also described as short, however its length is unclear as the basal parts are not preserved.

The abdomen's lobes were interpreted as "leaflike, veined tracheal gills", but no traces of tracheae or articulation are seen either, with them extending along the entire abdominal segment unlike in modern mayflies. While members of Coxoplectoptera do have gills along the entire length of their abdominal segments, these are still articulated. Furthermore, these structures bend along with the body, unlike movable gills. The paracercus is said to be longer than the cerci, although both are broken at their ends and so their exact length is uncertain.

=== Likely forgery of features ===
While only one complete leglet is preserved with two segments, nine pairs each with seven segments were interpreted in the original description, alongside the ninth pair becoming a pair of clasper-like structures. No evidence of these nine pairs or the claspers is preserved at all beyond faint traces of a few other leglets. Even the photographs are inconsistent, with one "in oblique lighting" showing three leglets but another showing only one in their place. This large inconsistency in segment count and leglet number between the original paper and redescription is likely due to a retouching pen being used to fake additional features, as the boundaries of the extra "segments" clearly are different in colour from the actual fossil. This kind of "over-interpretation" is also seen in other insects which anatomy described by Kukalová-Peck, such as Gerarus which fossils were processed.

== Phylogeny ==
The below phylogeny is based on the phylogenetic analysis by Sroka et al. (2015). Within Dicondylia, Carbotriplurida and Pterygota (the winged insects) form a clade named Paranotalia, which is the sister clade to Zygentoma.

- Dicondylia
  - Zygentoma
  - Paranotalia
    - †Carbotriplurida
    - Pterygota
      - Neopterygota
        - †Palaeodictyopterida
        - Neoptera
      - Hydropalaeoptera
        - †Bojophlebiidae
        - Euhydropalaeoptera
          - Odonatoptera
          - Panephemeroptera
