= Longzhua =

Longzhua Temporal range: Pennsylvanian

Scientific classification
- Kingdom: Animalia
- Phylum: Arthropoda
- Class: Insecta
- Superorder: Archaeorthoptera
- Family: incertae sedis
- Genus: †Longzhua Gu, Béthoux & Ren, 2011
- Species: †L. loculata

Binomial name
- †Longzhua loculata Gu, Béthoux & Ren, 2011

Extinct genus of cricket-like animals

Longzhua loculata is an extinct archaeorthopteran (stem group Orthoptera) species which existed in what is now China during the Pennsylvanian period. Fossils of the genus were found in the Yanghugou Formation.
