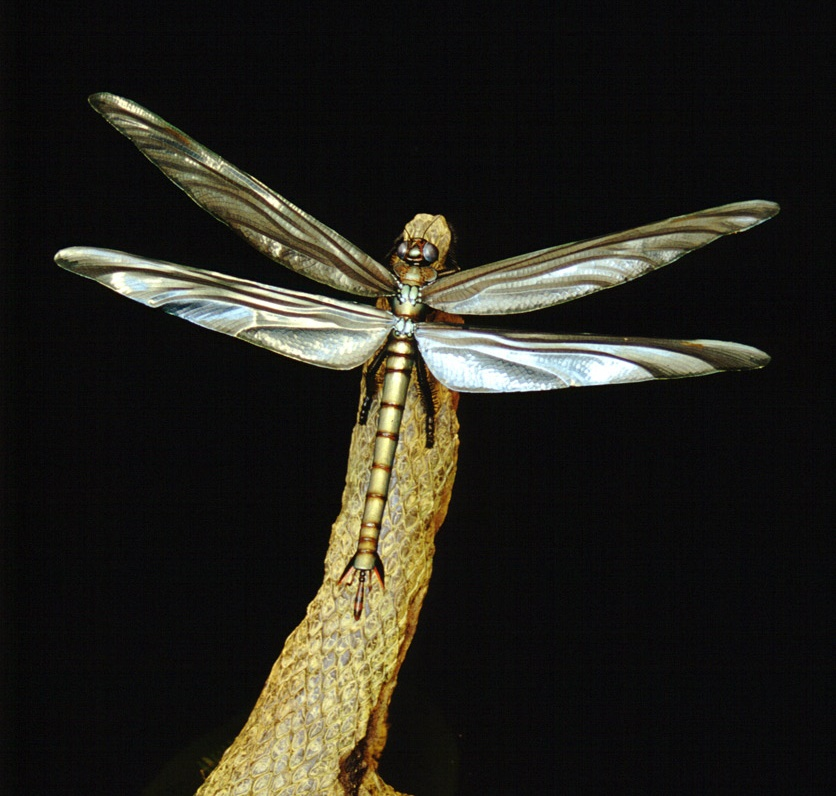
- A reconstitution of Namurotypus sippeli

Scientific classification
- Kingdom: Animalia
- Phylum: Arthropoda
- Class: Insecta
- Order: †Meganisoptera
- Family: †Namurotypidae; Bechly, 1996
- Genus: †Namurotypus; Brauckmann & Zessin, 1989
- Species: †N. sippeli

Binomial name
- †Namurotypus sippeli Brauckmann & Zessin, 1989

= Namurotypus =

Namurotypus Temporal range: Carboniferous, 318.1–314.6 Ma

Extinct genus of dragonfly-like insects

Namurotypus is an extinct genus of griffinfly with a single described species Namurotypus sippeli. It is the only member of the family Namurotypidae. It inhabited the large swamps of the Carboniferous period. Namurotypus had a 15 cm long forewing and did not have secondary male sex organs as in modern dragonflies.
