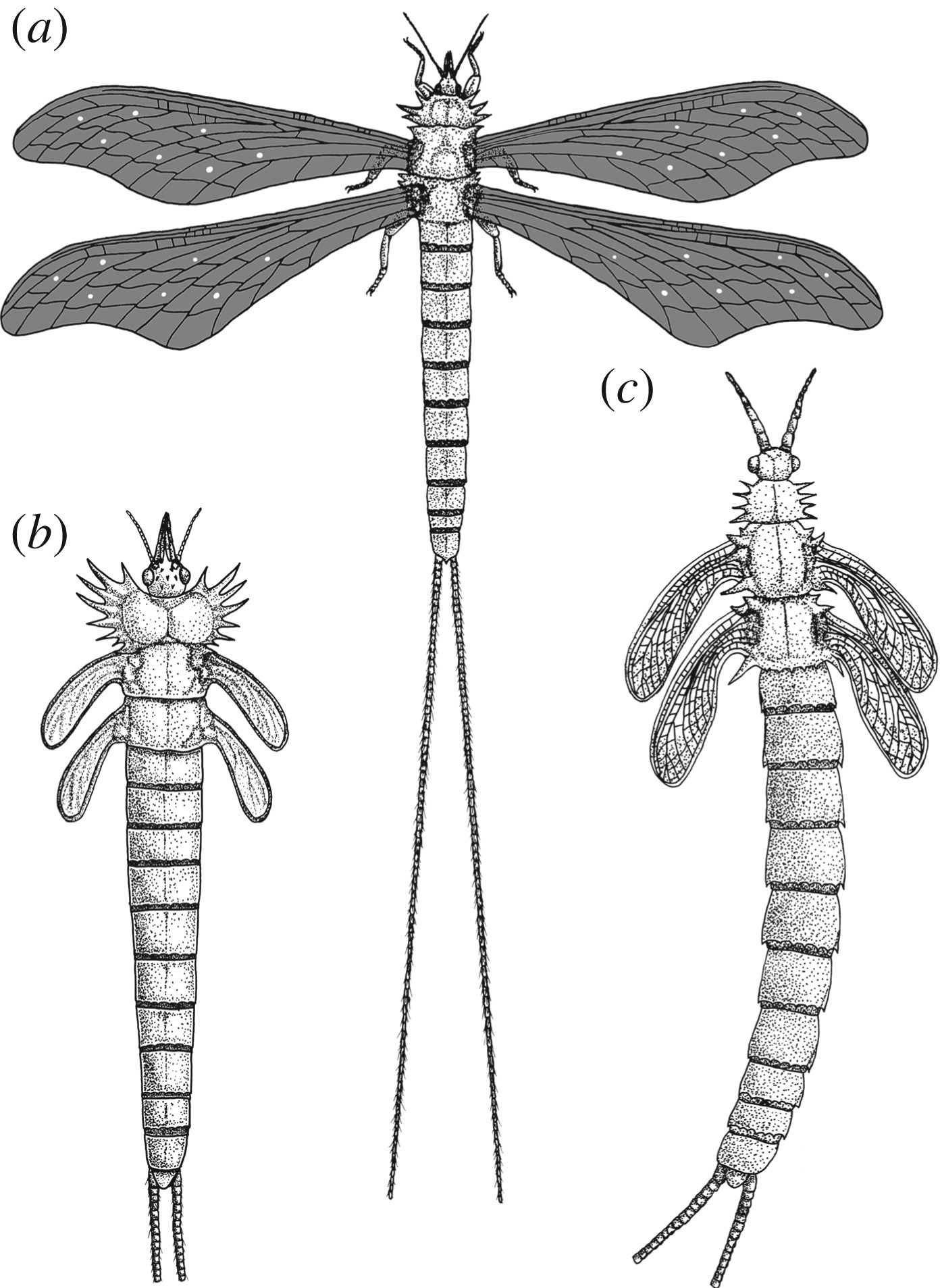
- Adult of Mischoptera nigra (a) and reconstructions of early (b) and late (c) larvae of Mischoptera douglassi
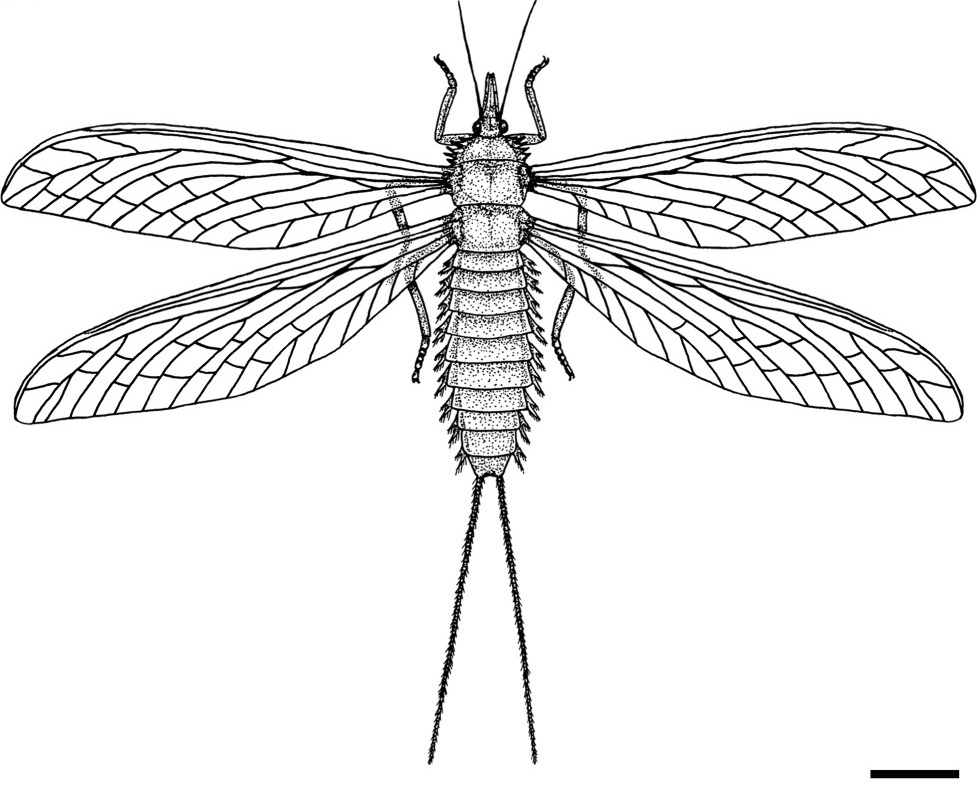
- Restoration of Corydaloides scudderi

Scientific classification
- Kingdom: Animalia
- Phylum: Arthropoda
- Clade: Pancrustacea
- Class: Insecta
- Superorder: †Palaeodictyopterida
- Order: †Megasecoptera; Brongniart, 1885

Taxa
- See Taxonomy

Synonyms
- Protohymenoptera Tillyard, 1924a

= Megasecoptera =

Megasecoptera Temporal range: 326–252 Ma

Extinct order of insects

Megasecoptera is a Paleozoic insect order. There are 22 known families of megasecopterans, with about 35 known genera.

== Overview ==
Like all other paleodictyopteroids, the megasecopterans had sucking mouthparts. The suctorial mouth parts were probably used to pierce plant casings and extract high-quality plant materials, such as spores and pollen.

Unlike some earlier insects, megasecopterans bore two pairs of wings, which were nearly of the same size. The wings probably were held horizontally, as in dragonflies (Odonata, Anisoptera). The wing bases tend to be very slender and petiolated, as in damselflies (Odonata, Zygoptera). The body was usually long and thin, although the genus Protohymen was rather stouter and shorter than a typical megasecopteran. Another distinctive feature was the presence of a number of fine processes projecting from the body, which in some cases could be longer than the body itself, forming long fringes on the insect's underside.

During their relatively brief period of existence, the Megasecoptera were rather successful. It has been estimated that this insect order accounted for 50% of the insect biomass in some locations, but the available evidence might be misleading..

== Taxonomy ==
The following taxa are recognized as being included in the order Megasecoptera:

- Suborder †Eumegasecopterahide
  - Family †Aykhalidae Sinitshenkova 1993
    - Genus †Aykhal Sinitshenkova 1993
    - Genus †Namuroptera Pecharová et al. 2015
    - Genus †Sinopalaeopteryx Pecharová et al. 2015
  - Family †Brodiopteridae Carpenter 1963
    - Genus †Brodioptera Copeland 1957

Unattributed to a suborder

- Family †Alectoneuridae Kukalová-Peck 1975
  - Genus †Alectoneura Kukalová-Peck 1975
- Family †Anchineuridae Carpenter 1963
  - Genus †Anchineura Carpenter 1963
- Family †Ancopteridae Kukalová-Peck 1975
  - Genus †Agaeoleptoptera Beckemeyer and Engel 2011
  - Genus †Ancoptera Kukalová-Peck 1975
- Family †Arcioneuridae Kukalová-Peck 1975
  - Genus †Anconeura Kukalová-Peck 1975
  - Genus †Arcioneura Kukalová-Peck 1975
- Family †Aspidohymenidae Martynov 1930
  - Genus †Aspidohymen Martynov 1930
- Family †Aspidothoracidae Handlirsch 1919
  - Genus †Aspidothorax Brongniart 1894
- Family †Bardohymenidae Zalessky 1937
  - Genus †Actinohymen Carpenter 1962
  - Genus †Alexahymen Kukalová-Peck 1972
  - Genus †Anthohymen Hong 1985
  - Genus †Bardohymen Zalessky 1937
  - Genus †Calohymen Carpenter 1947
  - Genus †Microhymen Yang et al. 2023
  - Genus †Paleohymen Hong 1985
  - Genus †Sinohymen Hong 1985
  - Genus †Sunohymen Hong 1985
  - Genus †Sylvohymen Martynov 1940
  - Genus †Taigahymen Sinitshenkova 2019
- Family †Brodiidae Handlirsch 1906
  - Genus †Brodia Scudder 1881
  - Genus †Eubrodia Carpenter 1967
  - Genus †Piesbergbrodia Pecharová et al. 2020
- Family †Caulopteridae Kukalová-Peck 1975
  - Genus †Cauloptera Kukalová-Peck 1975
- Family †Corydaloididae Handlirsch 1906
  - Genus †Corydaloides Brongniart 1885
- Family †Dictyoneurellidae Kukalová-Peck 1975
  - Genus †Dictyoneurella Laurentiaux 1949
- Family †Engisopteridae Kukalová-Peck 1975
  - Genus †Engisoptera Kukalová-Peck 1975
- Family †Foririidae Handlirsch 1919
  - Genus †Foriria Meunier 1908
- Family †Ischnoptilidae Carpenter 1951
  - Genus †Ischnoptilus Brongniart 1894
- Family †Mischopteridae Handlirsch 1906
  - Genus †Mischoptera Brongniart 1894
  - Genus †Psilothorax Brongniart 1894
- Family †Moravohymenidae Kukalová-Peck 1972
  - Genus †Issadohymen Sinitshenkova and Aristov 2013
  - Genus †Moravohymen Kukalová-Peck 1972
- Family †Piesbergpteridae Rosová et al. 2022
  - Genus †Piesbergptera Rosová et al. 2022
- Family †Protohymenidae Tillyard 1924
  - Genus †Arroyohymen Prokop and Kukalová-Peck 2017
  - Genus †Carbohymen Pecharová and Prokop 2018
  - Genus †Ivahymen Martynov 1932
  - Genus †Permohymen Tillyard 1924
  - Genus †Protohymen Tillyard 1924
- Family †Scytohymenidae Martynov 1937
  - Genus †Karoohymen Riek 1976
  - Genus †Oceanoptera Shcherbakov 2009
  - Genus †Scytohymen Martynov 1937
  - Genus †Tshekardohymen Rohdendorf 1940
- Family †Sphecopteridae Carpenter 1951
  - Genus †Cyclocelis Brongniart 1894
  - Genus †Sphecoptera Brongniart 1894
- Family †Sphecorydaloididae Pinto 1994
  - Genus †Sphecorydaloides Pinto 1994
- Family †Vorkutiidae Rohdendorf 1947
  - Genus †Fragmohymen Novokshonov 1995
  - Genus †Siberiohymen Rohdendorf 1961
  - Genus †Vorkutia Rohdendorf 1947
- Family †Xenopteraidae Pinto 1986
  - Genus †Sinitshenkovae Nel et al. 2019
  - Genus †Xenoptera Pinto 1986

Unattributed to a family

- Genus †Adiaphtharsia Handlirsch 1906
- Genus †Lameereites Handlirsch 1911

== Sources ==
Palaeos.com
