= Largest living flying birds by wingspan =

The table contains a list of the largest living birds in the world by wingspan, at maximum, assumed to be reliable by experts and verified records, with a wingspan of at least 3 m (9 ft 10 in).

Rank	Image	Ave	Scientific name	Maximum wingspans [m (ft)]
1		Flying albatross	Diomedea exulans	3.7 m (12 ft 2 in)
2		Great white pelican	Pelecanus onocrotalus	3.6 m (11 ft 10 in)
3		Southern royal albatross	Diomedea epomophora	3.51 m (11 ft 6 in)
3		Dalmatian pelican	Pelecanus crispus	3.51 m (11 ft 6 in)
4		Snowy albatross	Diomedea dabbenena	3.5 m (11 ft 6 in)
5		Amsterdam albatross	Diomedea amsterdamensis	3.4 m (11 ft 2 in)
6		Antipodean albatross	Diomedea antipodensis	3.3 m (10 ft 10 in)
6		Andean condor	Vultur gryphus	3.3 m (10 ft 10 in)
7		Northern royal albatross	Diomedea sanfordi	3.2 m (10 ft 6 in)
7		Marabou stork	Leptoptilos crumenifer	3.2 m (10 ft 6 in)
8		Cinereous vulture	Aegypius monachus	3.1 m (10 ft 2 in)
8		Himalayan vulture	Gyps himalayensis	3.1 m (10 ft 2 in)
8		Trumpeter swan	Cygnus buccinator	3.1 m (10 ft 2 in)
