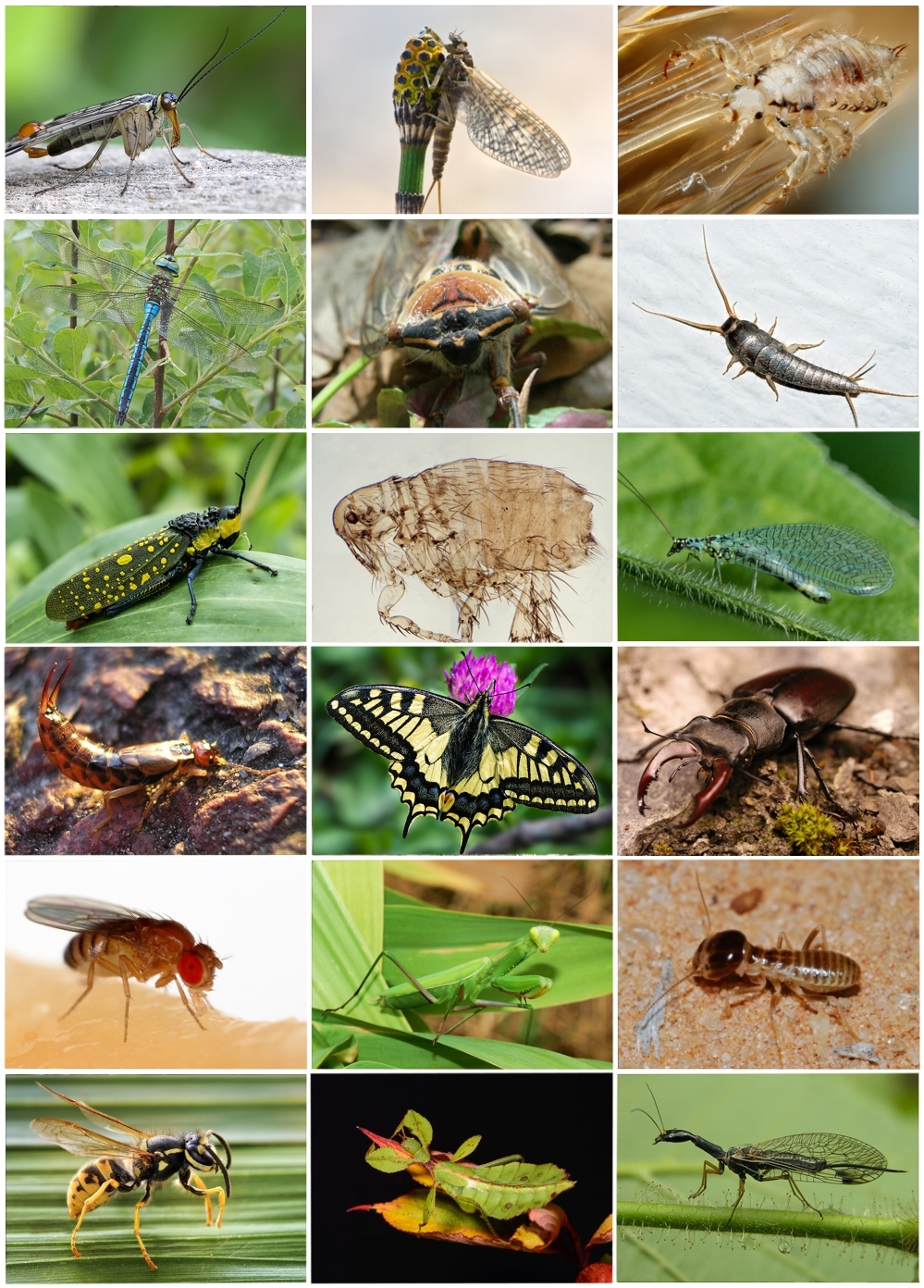
- Diversity of dicondylians from different orders.

Scientific classification
- Kingdom: Animalia
- Phylum: Arthropoda
- Clade: Pancrustacea
- Subphylum: Hexapoda
- Class: Insecta
- Clade?: Dicondylia; Hennig, 1953

Subgroups
- Zygentoma; †Strudiella?; Paranotalia; †Carbotriplurida; Pterygota; Incertae sedis; †unnamed mazon creek fossil? (Carbotriplurida?)

= Dicondylia =

Dicondylia Temporal range: 396–0 Ma Early Devonian (but see text)–Present

Unranked taxon

Dicondylia is a taxonomic group (taxon) that includes all insects except the jumping bristletails (Archaeognatha). Dicondylia species have a mandible attached with two hinges to the head capsule (dicondyl), in contrast to a hypothetical ancestral mandible with a single ball joint (monocondyl); the members of Archaeognatha do in fact have dicondylic mandibles, though they are not identical to the structure seen in "true" dicondylic insects.

== Dicondyle mandible and other features ==
The taxon is distinguished by the possession of a modified mandible with an additional joint canal, which also changes the muscle attachments of the mouth tools and allows a modified mandible movement compared to other mandibles (crustaceans, centipedes). This so-called dicondyle mandible has two joints with which it is attached to the head capsule, while non-insect taxa have only one single ball joint. The archaeognathans were once thought to have only a single articulation, but it has since been shown that they do possess two articulations that are homologous to those in other insects, though slightly different.

In addition to this feature, all members of Dicondylia have a number of other group-specific features in their blueprint. They have a continuous occipital seam, and a further joint between the upper and lower limbs. At the base of the oviposition tube (ovipositor), there is an additional sclerite, the gonangulum, which allows for the improved coordination of the movement of the gonapophyses. In addition, all these insects ancestrally have a five-membered tarsus and styli are present at their maximum at the two last abdominal segments. Another feature relates to embryonic development; all Dicondylia form a closed amniotic cavity around the embryos, producing two complete embryonic shells (the amnion and serosa).

== Systematics ==
Dicondylia includes all of the winged and secondarily wingless insects (Pterygota), along with the Zygentoma (silverfish, etc.) that were formerly classified with the jumping bristletails in the now deprecated order Thysanura.
