= Paralogidae =

Paralogidae Temporal range: Moscovian–Asselian

Scientific classification
- Kingdom: Animalia
- Phylum: Arthropoda
- Class: Insecta
- Order: †Meganisoptera
- Family: †Paralogidae; Handlirsch, 1906

Extinct genus of dragonfly-like insects

Paralogidae is an extinct family of griffinflies in the order Meganisoptera. There are at least two genera and three described species in Paralogidae.

== Genera ==
These three genera belong to the family Paralogidae:

- † Oligotypus Carpenter, 1931
- † Paralogus Scudder, 1893
- † Truemania Bolton, 1934
