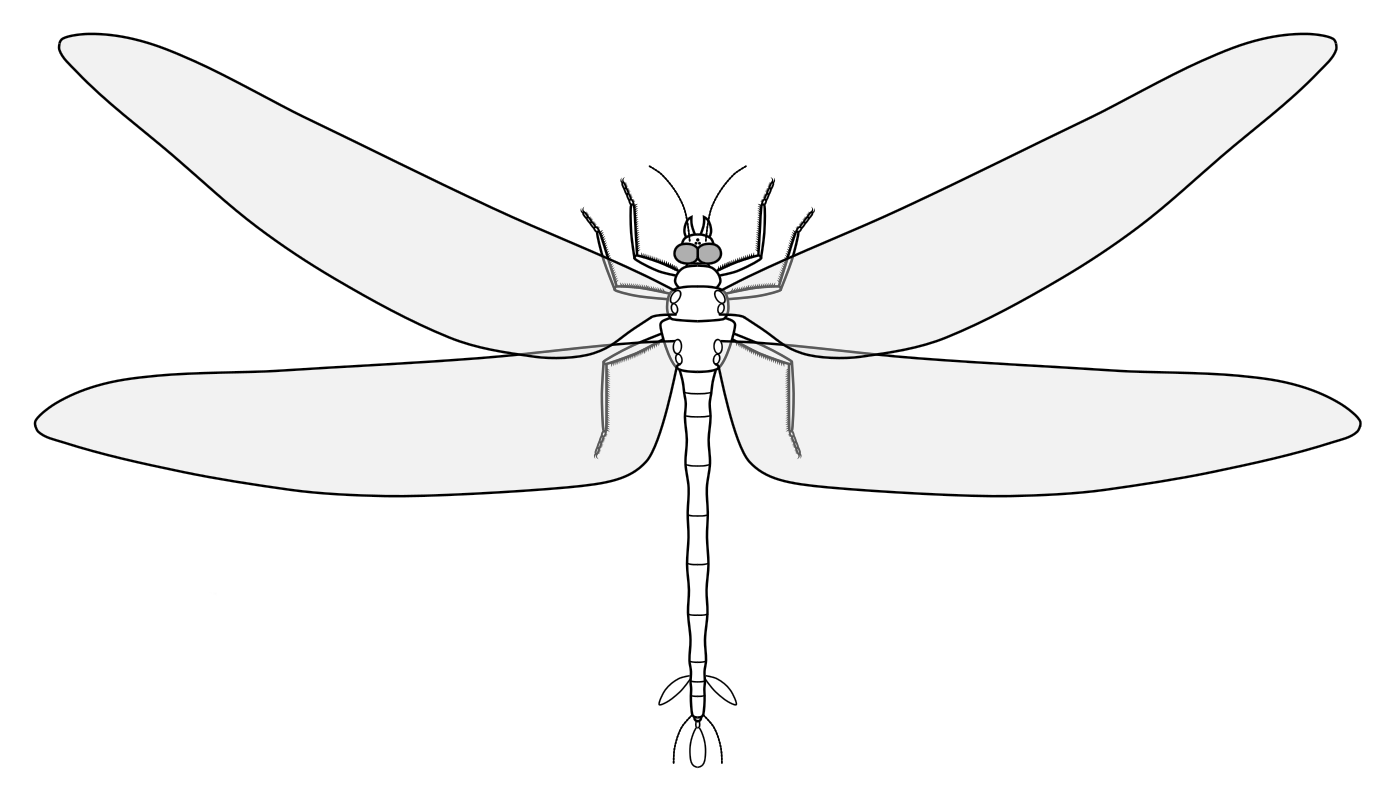
- Diagrammatic reconstruction of Meganeuropsis permiana

Scientific classification
- Kingdom: Animalia
- Phylum: Arthropoda
- Clade: Pancrustacea
- Class: Insecta
- Order: †Meganisoptera
- Family: †Meganeuridae
- Genus: †Meganeuropsis; Carpenter, 1939

Species
- †M. americana Carpenter, 1947; †M. permiana Carpenter, 1939

= Meganeuropsis =

Meganeuropsis Temporal range: Artinskian

Extinct genus of dragonfly-like insects

Meganeuropsis, from Ancient Greek μέγας (mégas), meaning "large", νεῦρον (neûron), meaning "nerve", and ὄψις (ópsis), meaning "appearance", is an extinct genus of griffenfly, order Meganisoptera, known from the Early Permian Wellington Formation of North America, and represents the largest known insect of all time. Meganeuropsis existed during the Artinskian age of the Permian period, 290.1–283.5 mya. The genus includes two described species by Frank Morton Carpenter, fossil insect curator at the Museum of Comparative Zoology at Harvard University:

Meganeuropsis permiana described in 1939 from Elmo, Kansas. It was one of the largest known insects that ever lived, with a reconstructed wing length of 330 millimetres (13 in), an estimated wingspan of up to 710 millimetres (28 in), and a body length from head to tail of almost 430 millimetres (17 in). The holotype is held in the Museum of Comparative Zoology.

Meganeuropsis americana, discovered in Noble, Oklahoma in 1940, is most probably a junior synonym of Meganeuropsis permiana. It is represented by a forewing fragment 280 millimetres (11 in) long. The complete reconstructed wing had an estimated total length of 305 millimetres (12.0 in), making it the largest insect wing ever found (with a resulting wing span of 690 millimetres (27 in)). The holotype is held in the Museum of Comparative Zoology.

== See also ==
- List of largest insects
