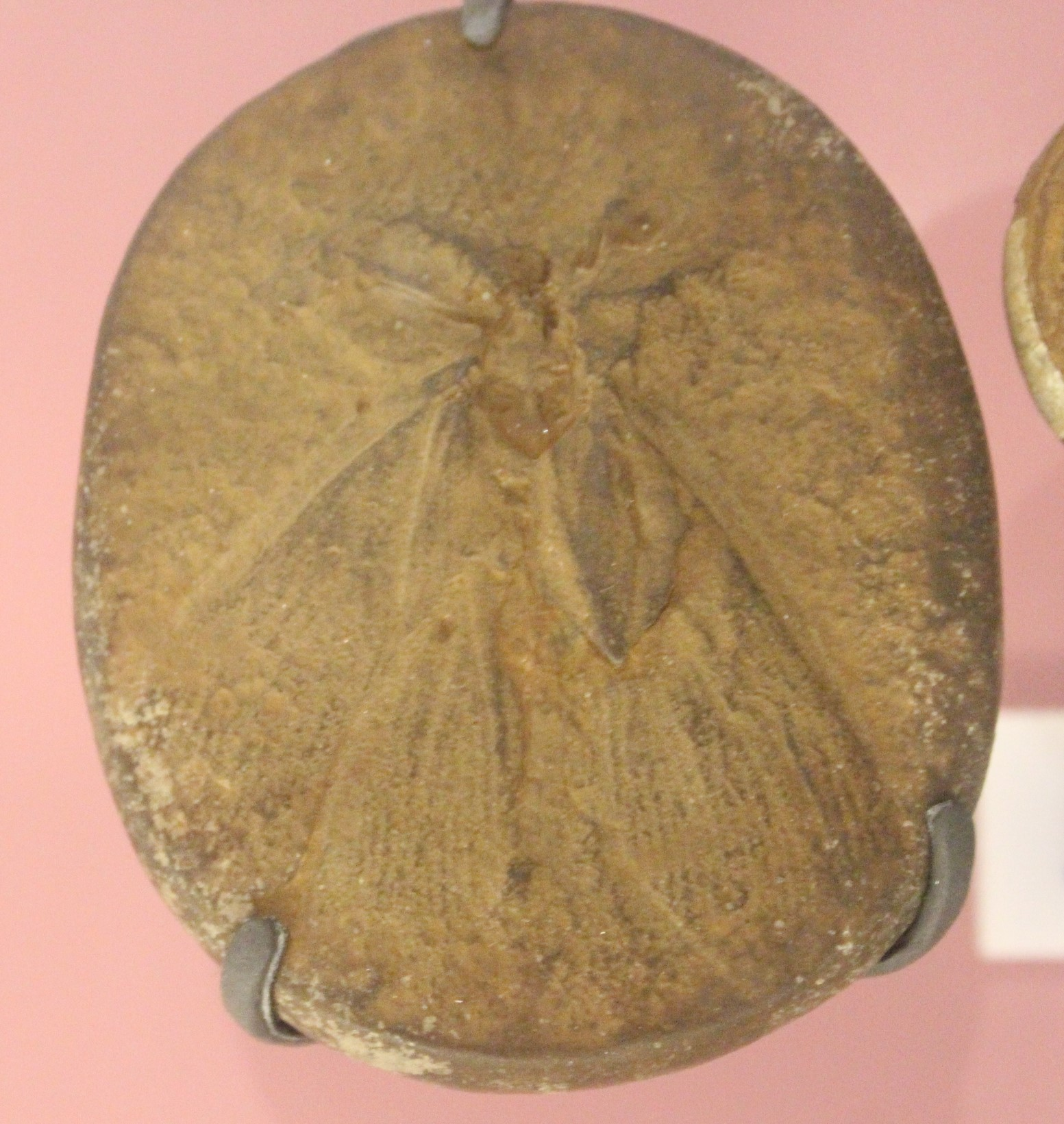
- Gerarus fossil, National Museum of Natural History

Scientific classification
- Kingdom: Animalia
- Phylum: Arthropoda
- Class: Insecta
- Superorder: Archaeorthoptera
- Order: incertae sedis
- Family: †Geraridae
- Genus: †Gerarus Scudder, 1885

= Gerarus =

Gerarus Temporal range: Carboniferous

Extinct genus of insects

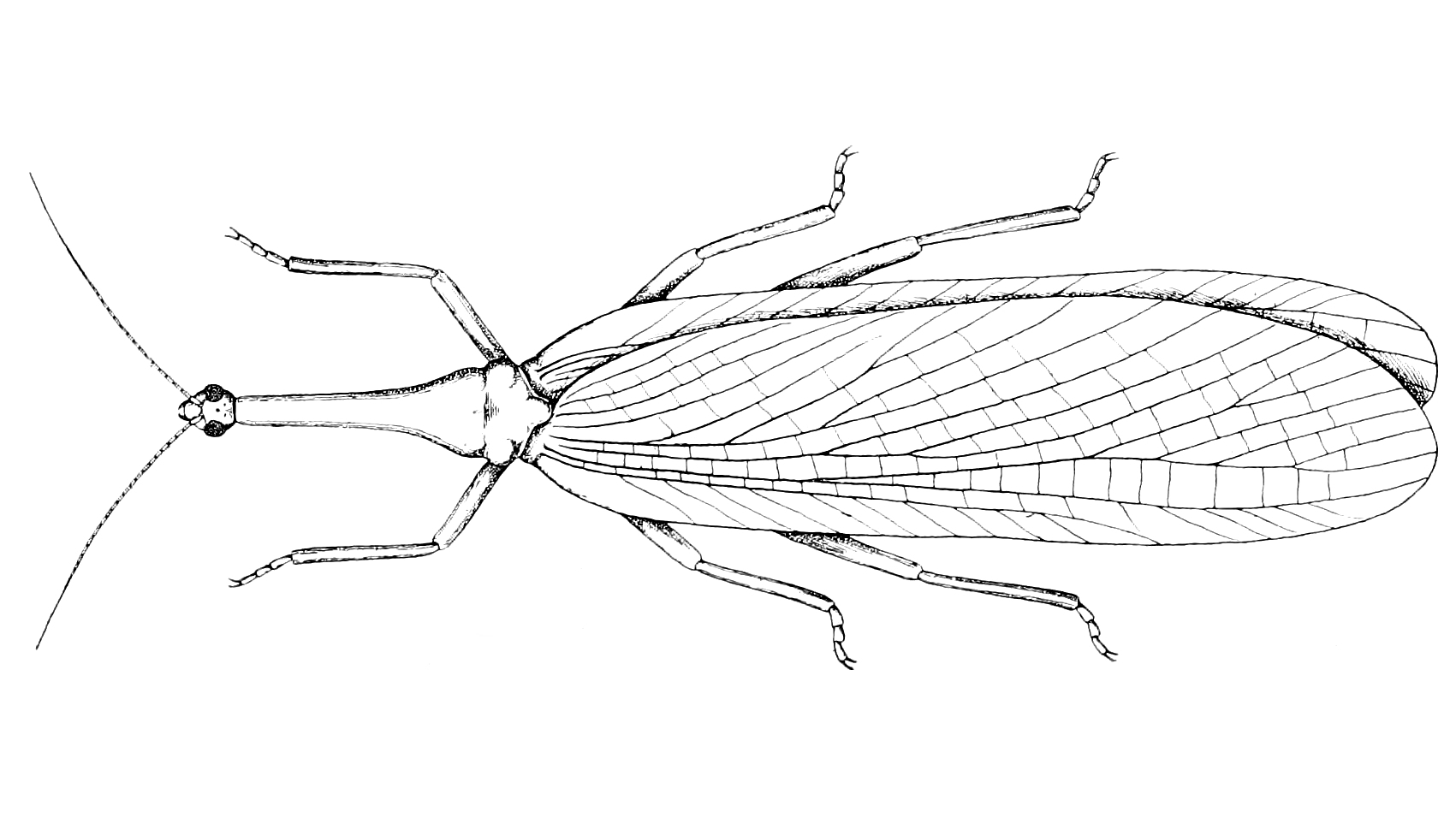
Illustration of Gerarus collaris

Gerarus is an extinct genus of archaeorthopteran insect, and is one of the most abundant genera of Carboniferous insects. They had a wingspan of up to 10 centimetres (4 in), and an inflated thorax armed with sharp spines up to 1 millimetre (0.04 in) long.

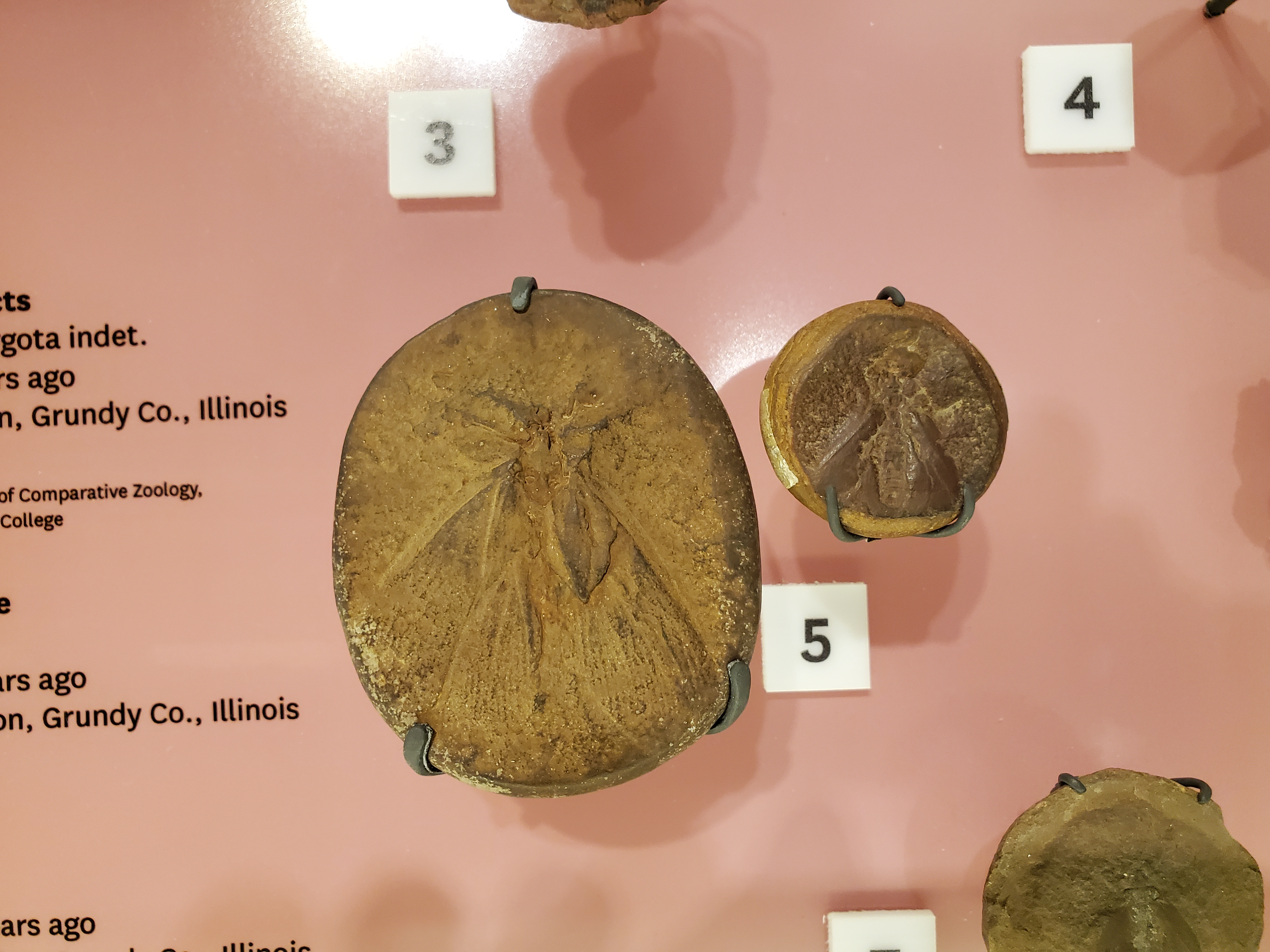
Gerarus sp. fossil and an indeterminate pterygote insect
