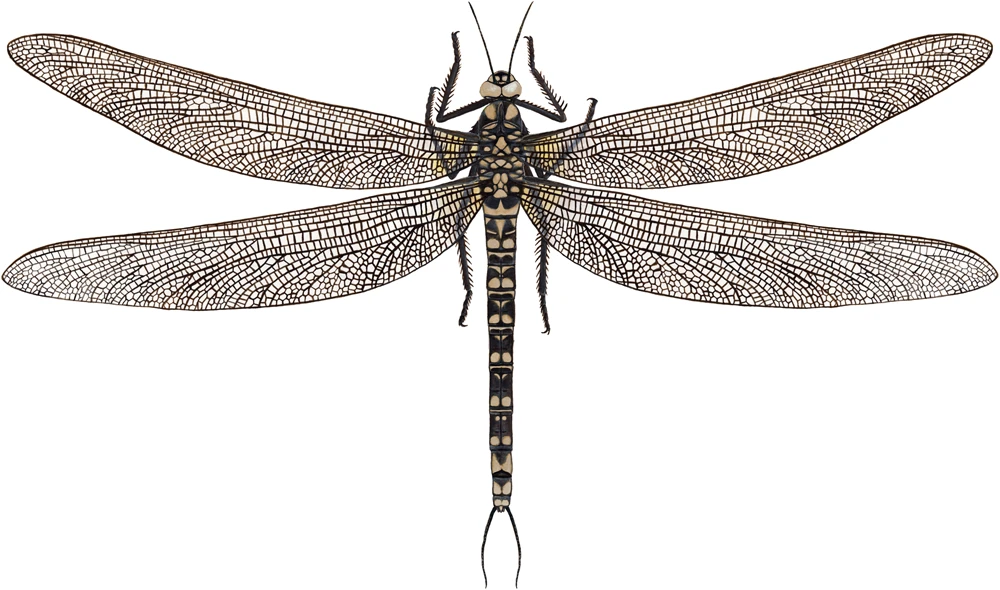
- Reconstruction of Meganeurites gracilipes

Scientific classification
- Kingdom: Animalia
- Phylum: Arthropoda
- Clade: Pancrustacea
- Class: Insecta
- Superorder: Odonatoptera
- Order: †Meganisoptera; Martynov, 1932

Families
- Aulertupidae Zessin & Brauckmann 2010; Kohlwaldiidae Guthörl 1962; Meganeuridae Handlirsch 1906; Namurotypidae Bechly 1996; Paralogidae Handlirsch 1906

Synonyms
- Protodonata C. Brongniart, 1893

= Meganisoptera =

Meganisoptera Temporal range: Pennsylvanian-Lopingian

Extinct order of dragonfly-like animals

Meganisoptera is an extinct order of large dragonfly-like insects, informally known as griffenflies, griffinflies, or (incorrectly) as giant dragonflies. The order was formerly named Protodonata, the "proto-Odonata", for their similar appearance and supposed relation to modern Odonata (damselflies and dragonflies). They range in Palaeozoic (Late Carboniferous to Late Permian) times. Though most were only slightly larger than modern dragonflies, the order includes the largest known insect species, such as the late Carboniferous Meganeura monyi and the even larger early Permian Meganeuropsis permiana, with wingspans of up to 71 centimetres (28 in).

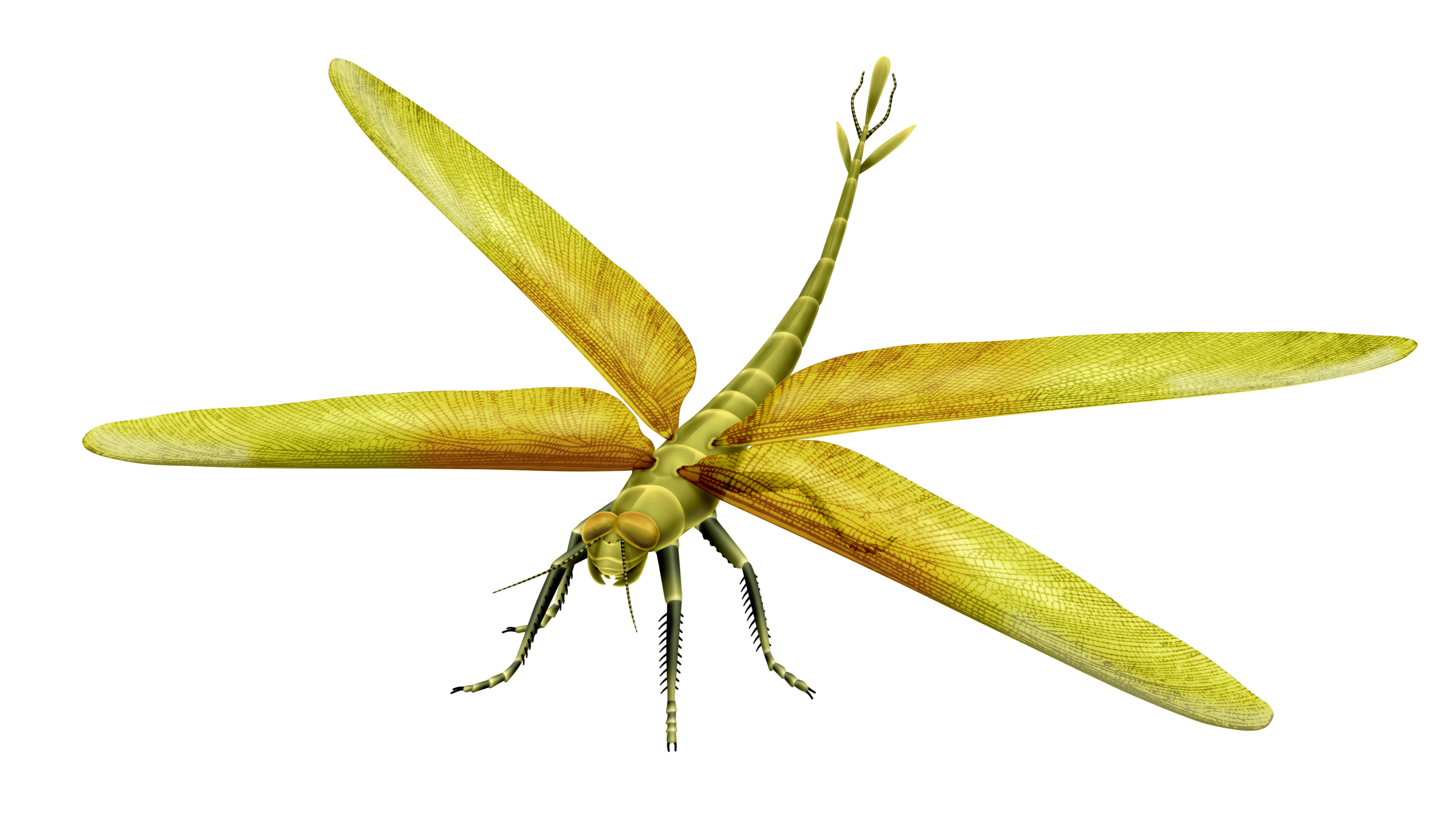
The giant Upper Carboniferous dragonfly relative, Meganeura monyi, attained a wingspan of about 680 millimetres (27 in)..

The forewings and hindwings are similar in venation (a primitive feature) except for the larger anal (rearwards) area in the hindwing. The forewing is usually slenderer and slightly longer than the hindwing. Unlike the true dragonflies, the Odonata, they had no pterostigmata, and had a somewhat simpler pattern of veins in the wings.

Most specimens are known from wing fragments only; with only a few as complete wings, and even fewer (of the family Meganeuridae) with body impressions. These show a globose head with large dentate mandibles, strong spiny legs, a large thorax, and long and slender dragonfly-like abdomen. Like true dragonflies, they were presumably predators.

A few nymphs are also known, and show mouthparts similar to those of modern dragonfly nymphs, suggesting that they were also active aquatic predators.

Although sometimes included under the dragonflies, the Meganisoptera lack certain distinctive wing features that characterise the Odonata. Grimaldi & Engel 2005 point out that the colloquial term "giant dragonfly" is therefore misleading, and suggest "griffenfly" instead.

== Size ==
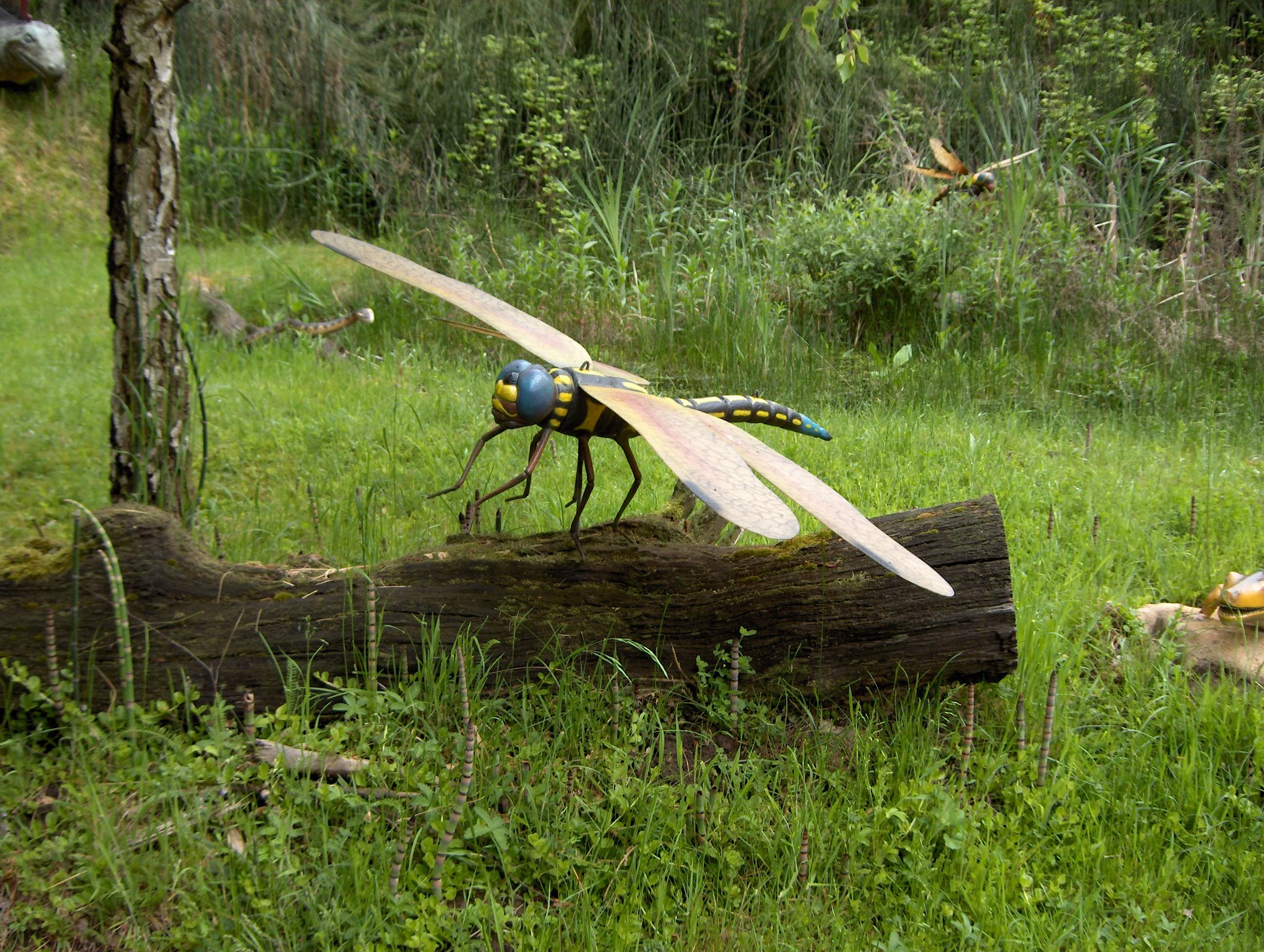
Scale model of a meganisopteran. (Note: The model in this photograph incorrectly depicts pterostigmata on the wings.)

Controversy has prevailed as to how insects of the Carboniferous period were able to grow so large. The way oxygen is diffused through the insect's body via its tracheal breathing system (see Respiratory system of insects) puts an upper limit on body size, which prehistoric insects seem to have well exceeded. It was originally proposed in Harlé (1911) that Meganeura was able to fly only because the atmosphere at that time contained more oxygen than the present 20%. This theory was dismissed by fellow scientists, but has found approval more recently through further study into the relationship between gigantism and oxygen availability. If this theory is correct, these insects would have been susceptible to falling oxygen levels and certainly could not survive in the modern atmosphere. Other research indicates that insects really do breathe, with "rapid cycles of tracheal compression and expansion".

Recent analysis of the flight energetics of modern insects and birds suggests that both the oxygen levels and air density provide a bound on size. A recent allometric model suggests that the power a unit of griffenfly muscle mass could produce must have scaled up about equally with the muscle mass itself to have allowed these giant insects to fly, in contrast to a mere estimated muscle power increase by mass^{0.24} in living dragonflies.

A general problem with all oxygen-related explanations of giant griffenflies is the circumstance that very large Meganeuridae (Arctotypus sp.) with a wingspan of 45 cm also occurred in the Late Permian of Lodève in France, when the oxygen content of the atmosphere was already much lower than in the Carboniferous and Early Permian.

Bechly 2004 suggests that the lack of aerial vertebrate predators allowed pterygote insects to evolve to maximum sizes during the Carboniferous and Permian periods. A later article seconds that hypothesis, finding that insect wing size historically varied in tandem with atmospheric oxygen till the end of the Triassic Period, when birds began to emerge: "Maximum insect size decreased even as atmospheric [oxygen concentration] rose in the Early Cretaceous following the evolution and radiation of early birds." Bechly also proposes an "evolutionary arms race" for increase in body size between plant-feeding Palaeodictyoptera and meganeurids as their predators.

== Families and genera ==
These families belong to the order Meganisoptera:

- Aulertupidae Zessin & Brauckmann 2010
- Kohlwaldiidae Guthörl 1962
- Meganeuridae Handlirsch 1906
- Namurotypidae Bechly 1996
- Paralogidae Handlirsch 1906

These genera belong to the order Meganisoptera, but have not been placed in families:

- Alanympha Kukalova-Peck 2009
- Asapheneura Pruvost 1919
- Dragonympha Kukalova-Peck 2009
- Palaeotherates Handlirsch 1906
- Paralogopsis Handlirsch 1911
- Schlechtendaliola Handlirsch, 1919
- Typoides Zalessky 1948

== Bibliography ==
- Bechly, G (2004). "Evolution and systematics" (PDF). In Hutchins, M.; Evans, A.V.; Garrison, R.W. & Schlager, N. (eds.). Grzimek's Animal Life Encyclopedia. Vol. Insects (2nd ed.). Farmington Hills, MI: Gale. pp. 7–16.
- Carpenter, F. M. (1992). "Superclass Hexapoda". Treatise on Invertebrate Paleontology. Vol. 3 of Part R, Arthropoda 4. Boulder, CO: Geological Society of America.
- Dudley, Robert (April 1998). "Atmospheric oxygen, giant Paleozoic insects and the evolution of aerial locomotion performance". The Journal of Experimental Biology. 201 (Pt8): 1043–1050. doi:10.1242/jeb.201.8.1043. PMID 9510518.
- Chapelle, Gauthier & Peck, Lloyd S. (May 1999). "Polar gigantism dictated by oxygen availability". Nature. 399 (6732): 114–115. Bibcode:1999Natur.399..114C. doi:10.1038/20099. S2CID 4308425.
- Grimaldi, David & Engel, Michael S. (2005-05-16). Evolution of the Insects. Cambridge University Press. ISBN 978-0-521-82149-0.
- Harlé, Edouard (1911). "Le Vol de grands reptiles et insectes disparus semble indiquer une pression atmosphérique élevée". Extr. Du Bulletin de la Sté Géologique de France (in French). 4 (9): 118–121.
- Hoell, H.V.; Doyen, J.T. & Purcell, A.H. (1998). Introduction to Insect Biology and Diversity (2nd ed.). Oxford University Press. ISBN 978-0-19-510033-4.
- Nel, André; Fleck, Günther; Garrouste, Romain; Gand, Georges; Lapeyrie, Jean; Bybee, Seth M & Prokop, Jakub (2009). "Revision of Permo-Carboniferous griffenflies (Insecta: Odonatoptera: Meganisoptera) based upon new species and redescription of selected poorly known taxa from Eurasia". Palaeontographica Abteilung A. 289 (4–6): 89–121. doi:10.1127/pala/289/2009/89.
- Nel, André; Fleck, Günther; Garrouste, Romain & Gand, Georges (2008). "The Odonatoptera of the Late Permian Lodève Basin (Insecta)". Journal of Iberian Geology. 34 (1): 115–122.
- Tasch, Paul (1980) [1973]. Paleobiology of the Invertebrates. John Wiley and Sons. p. 617.
- Tillyard, R.J. (1917). The Biology of Dragonflies. Cambridge University Press. p. 324. GGKEY:0Z7A1R071DD.
- Westneat, MW; Betz, O; Blob, RW; Fezzaa, K; Cooper, WJ & Lee, WK (January 2003). "Tracheal respiration in insects visualized with synchrotron x-ray imaging". Science. 299 (5606): 558–560. Bibcode:2003Sci...299..558W. doi:10.1126/science.1078008. PMID 12543973. S2CID 43634044.
