= Adrian Thomas (zoologist) =

- Born: Adrian Leland Rees Thomas; 1963 (age 62–63)
- Education: Abingdon School
- Alma mater: University of Oxford (MA); University of Lund (PhD)
- Spouse: Susan Thomas
- Children: Lauren Thomas
- Scientific career
- Fields: Zoology; Insect flight Ornithopters; Biomechanics
- Workplaces: University of Oxford; Animal Dynamics Ltd. University of Cambridge
- Thesis: On the tails of birds (1995)
- Website: www.zoo.ox.ac.uk/people/view/thomas_alr.htm

Adrian Leland Rees Thomas (born 1963) is a professor of biomechanics at the University of Oxford and Director of Studies in Biological Sciences at Lady Margaret Hall, Oxford running the Animal Flight Research Group. He is co-founder and Chief Scientific Officer at Animal Dynamics and is also chairman of the flight section of the Bionis International Biomimetics Network.

== Education ==
Thomas was educated at Abingdon School and studied zoology at Oxford as an undergraduate from 1981 to 1984. He completed a Doctor of Philosophy degree at Lund University in 1995 on the flight feathers of birds.

== Career and research ==
Thomas was appointed a fellow of Lady Margaret Hall in 1998 and professor of biomechanics in 2006. He founded the University of Oxford Animal Flight Research Group in 1996. His mechanical analogue of dragonflies was developed by his company, Animal Dynamics Ltd, to make small unmanned aerial vehicles (aka drones or ornithopters) to outperform quadcopters. His work has been funded by the Defence Science and Technology Laboratory, the research arm of the British Ministry of Defence, and the United States Air Force. The company is an Oxford University spin-off started in 2015 with co-founder Alex Caccia. The company has expanded into the biomechanics of fish to develop a machine powered by the same type of flapping propulsion.

His research investigates insect flight using dragonflies, butterflies, desert locusts and hawkmoths. Thomas has supervised several Doctor of Philosophy students including Graham Taylor, Simon Walker and Richard Bomphrey.

Thomas was a British champion in paragliding in 2006 and 2009. He is an executive board member of the British Hang Gliding and Paragliding Association. He was an aerodynamics consultant with Airwave Gliders GmbH, who manufactured paragliders, hang-gliders and ultralight aircraft.
