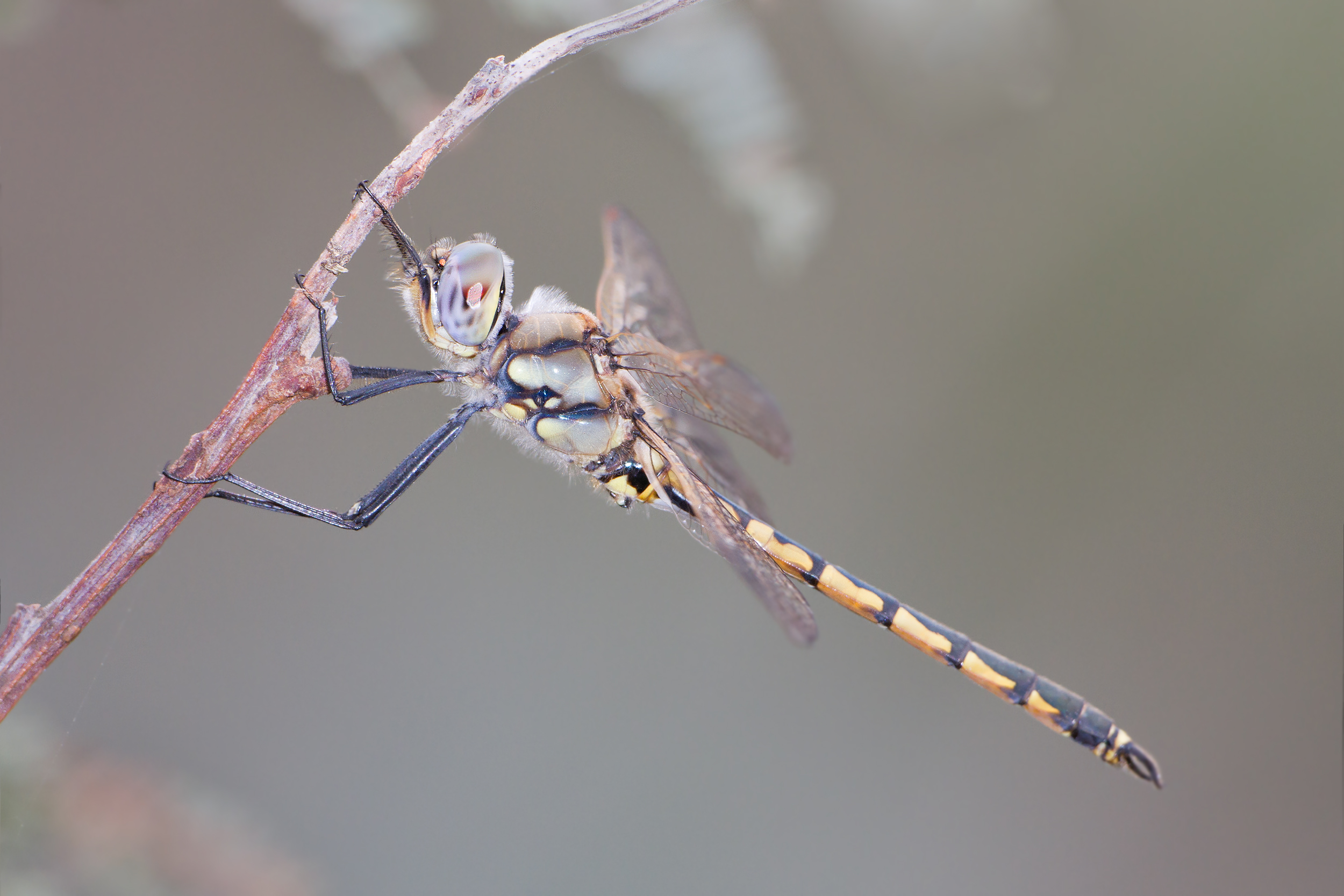
- Male
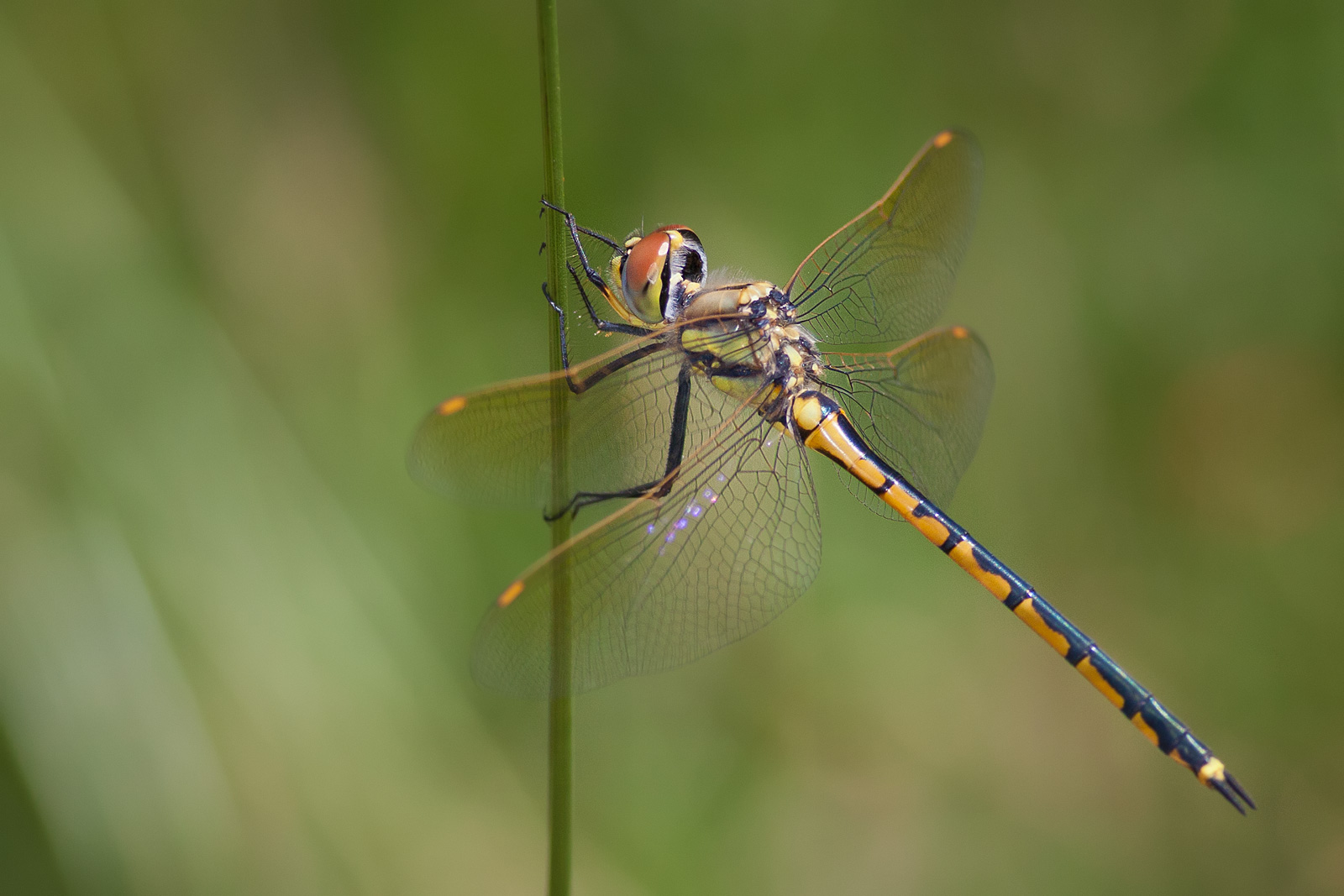
- Female

Conservation status
- Least Concern (IUCN 3.1)

Scientific classification
- Kingdom: Animalia
- Phylum: Arthropoda
- Clade: Pancrustacea
- Class: Insecta
- Order: Odonata
- Suborder: Anisoptera
- Superfamily: Libelluloidea
- Family: Corduliidae
- Genus: Hemicordulia
- Species: H. tau

Binomial name
- Hemicordulia tau (Selys, 1871)

= Tau emerald =

Species of dragonfly

The tau emerald (Hemicordulia tau) is a species of dragonfly in the family Corduliidae. The species was first described by Edmond de Sélys Longchamps in 1871.

== Description ==
=== Adult ===
The tau emerald is a medium-sized, black and yellow dragonfly with long legs, reaching a body length of about 50 mm. As is unique to dragonfly and mayfly species, H. tau has flight muscles attached directly to the wings, and in both the males and females the inboard edge of the hindwing is rounded. The 7th abdominal tergum is extensively black above and yellowish at the sides. The top of the frons are yellow with a dark T-mark. The species exhibits a linear relationship between head width and body length.

Nearly all of the dragonfly's head is eye, allowing incredible vision that encompasses almost every angle except right behind them. H. tau has a particularly large and well developed compound eye with two principal regions, the dorsal eye and the ventral eye. The dorsal eye is principally sensitive to short wavelength light, while the ventral eye has 3 or more spectral types of photoreceptors.

=== Larval stages ===
The length of time each larval stage of H. tau requires can decrease as the temperature of the water it inhabits increases. It is capable of completing its life cycle from egg to adult in less than 6 weeks. Nymphs reach a total length of 22–24 mm. No mid-dorsal abdominal spines are present unlike other Hemicordulia, but humps may be present on segments 4–9 and the lateral spines are very small. The nymphs have a ladle-shaped labium with premental and palpal setae, and well-developed palpal dentations bearing groups of setae. The prementum has a distinct ventro-basal midline/groove.

An analysis of head width frequencies of samples from Lake Eucumbene suggest there is at least 9 instars in the life history of H. tau, however the number of larval instars is known to vary between, and within, Odonata species.

== Ecology ==
H. tau is found in all parts of Australia except northern Queensland and north-western Western Australia and is one of Australia's most abundant dragonflies. It is considered a dry-country dragon fly, often inhabiting the arid Australian inland. The adults are vagrants and highly opportunistic users of habitat for breeding.

In addition to rivers, lakes and swamps H. tau has the ability to breed in temporary waters due to its short larval stages. Nymph have a high thermal growth coefficient and details of its life history may vary with their location. The nymph are able to tolerate the high temperatures found in temporary shallow ponds. The ability of H. tau to utilize temporary waters and reduce its larval life with increase in temperature contribute to its abundance and wide distribution. They are also able to overwinter in cold permanent refuges, and have been observed in water with a salinity between 7.8g/L to 13.9g/L.

H. tau larva, similar to other Odonata species, are associated with clean water and it has been suggested they could be monitored to detect changes in water quality. Larval habitat is typically leaf litter and weeds. Many aquatic invertebrates with terrestrial adult stages require a snag extending above the water surface for emergence to the adult stage.

Predators primarily include fish and birds.

== Conservation status ==
The tau emerald is listed as least concern under the International Union for Conservation of Nature and Natural Resources (IUCN) red list of threatened species. Population trend is classified as unknown and no conservation actions are recommended.

== Etymology ==
The genus name Hemicordulia is derived from the Greek ἡμι- (hēmi, "half"), combined with Cordulia, a genus name derived from the Greek κορδύλη (kordylē, "club" or "cudgel"). The name refers to the close relationship of the genus to Cordulia.

The species name tau is the name of the Greek letter τ (tau), corresponding to the Latin letter "T". The name refers to the T-shaped marking on the face.

== Gallery ==
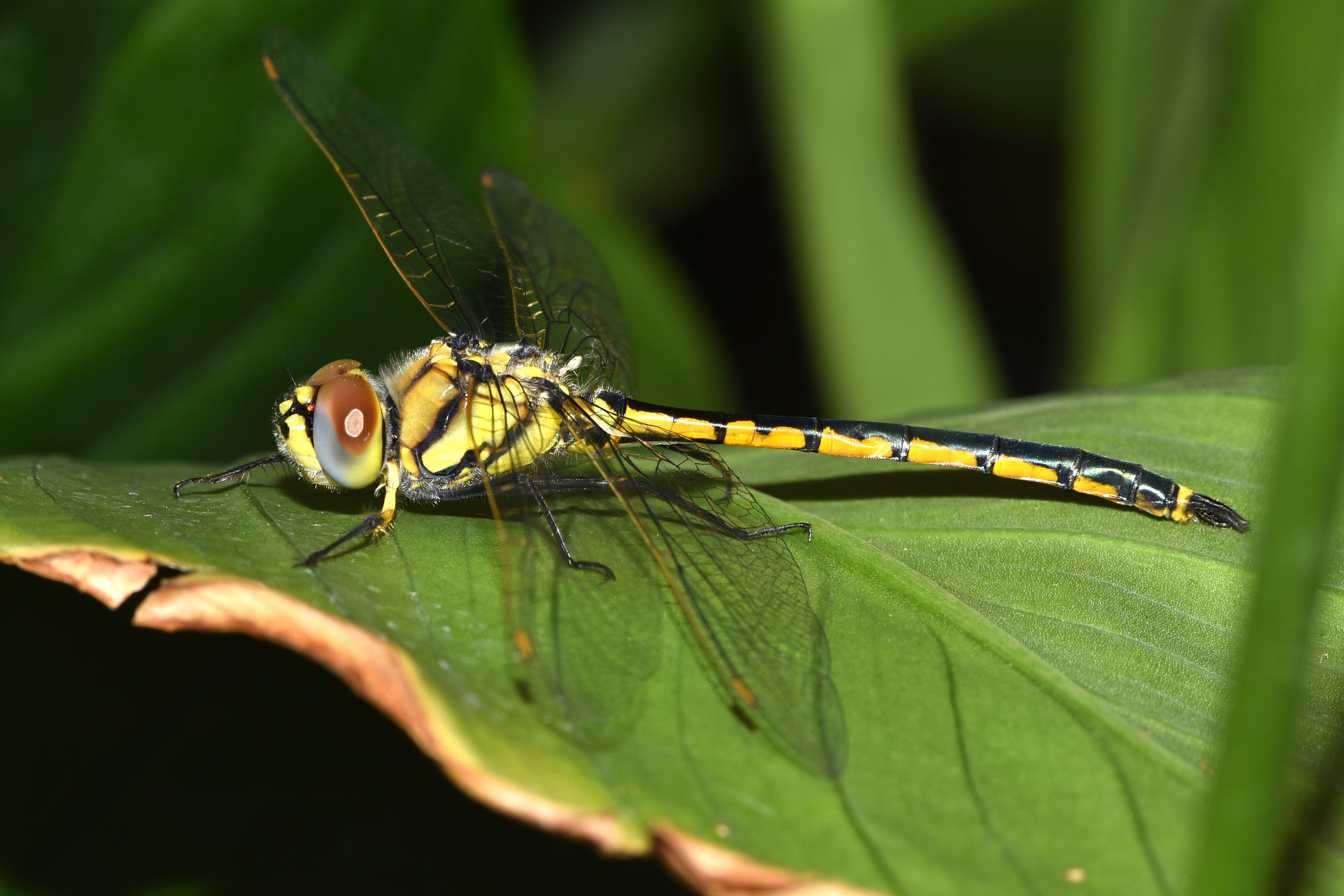
Tau Emerald Dragonfly

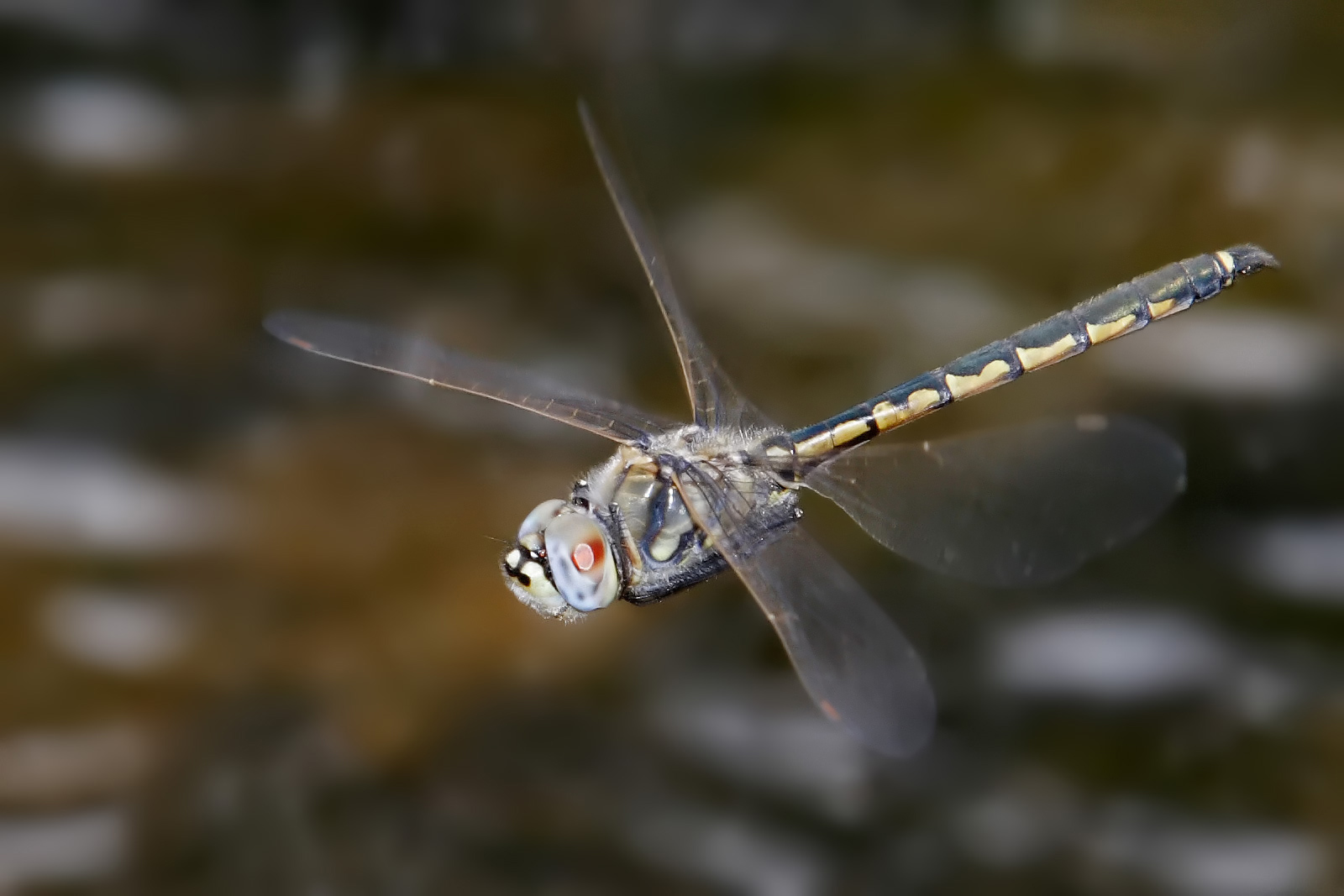
Male in flight

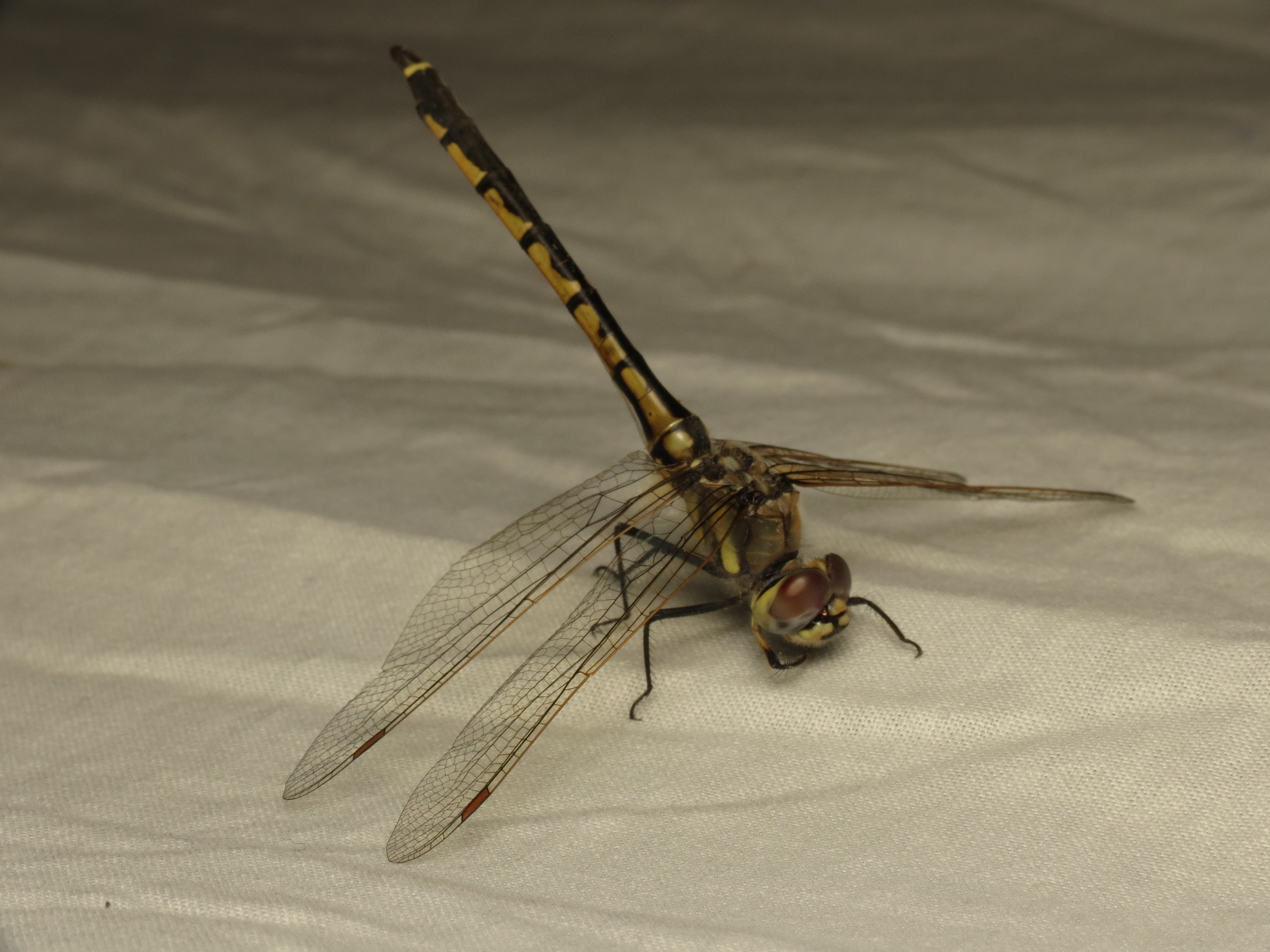
Female

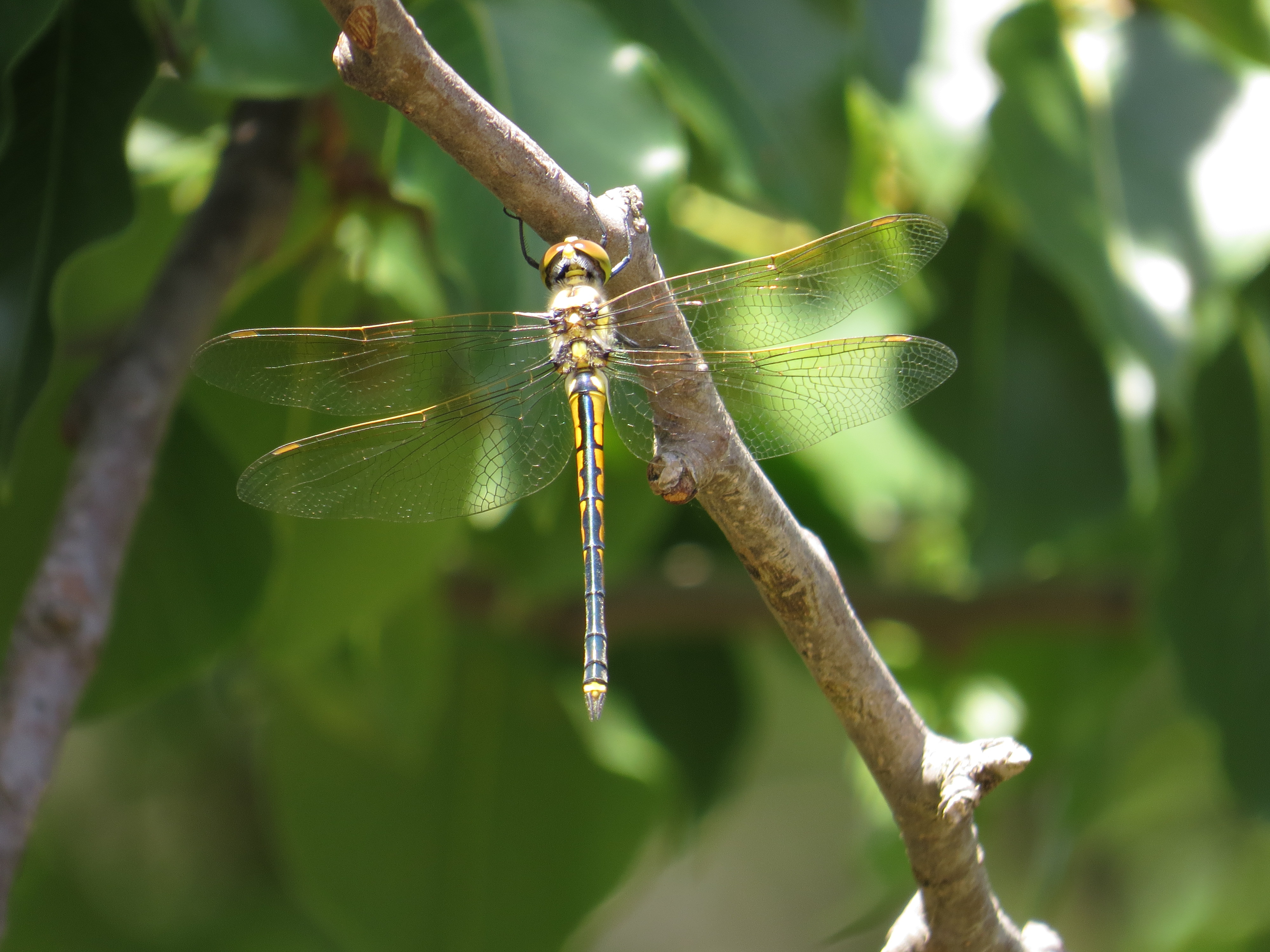
Female

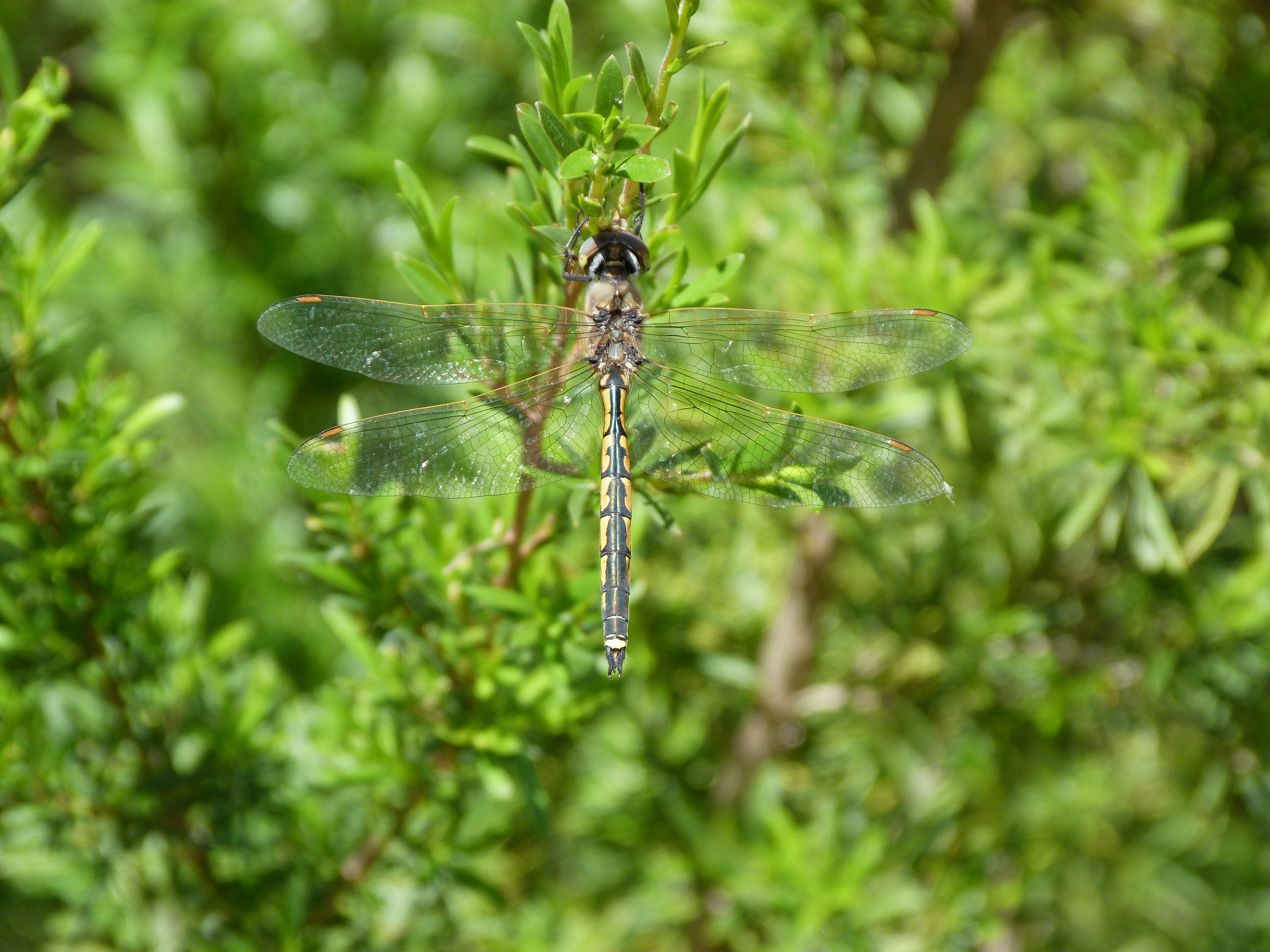
Male

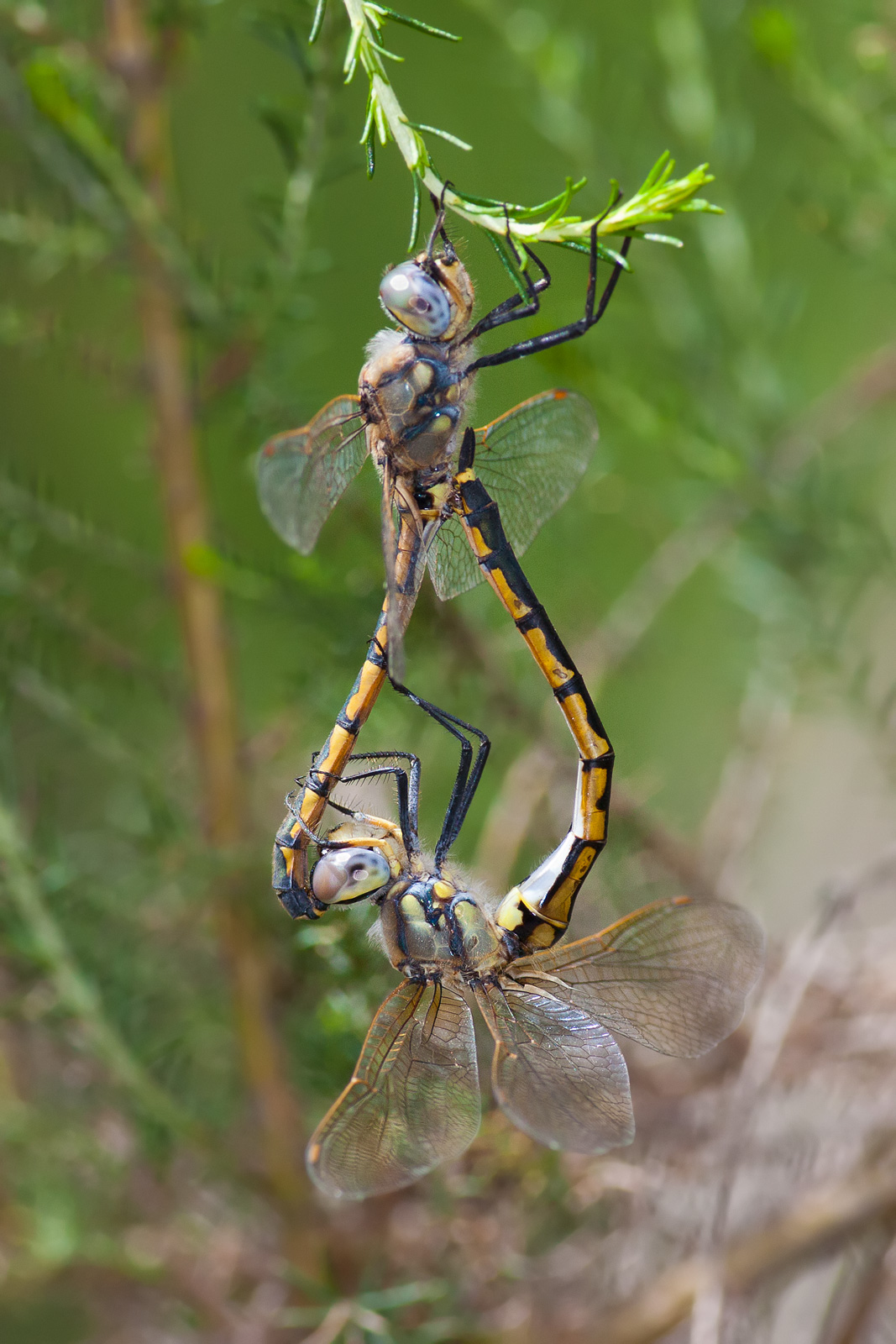
Mating pair

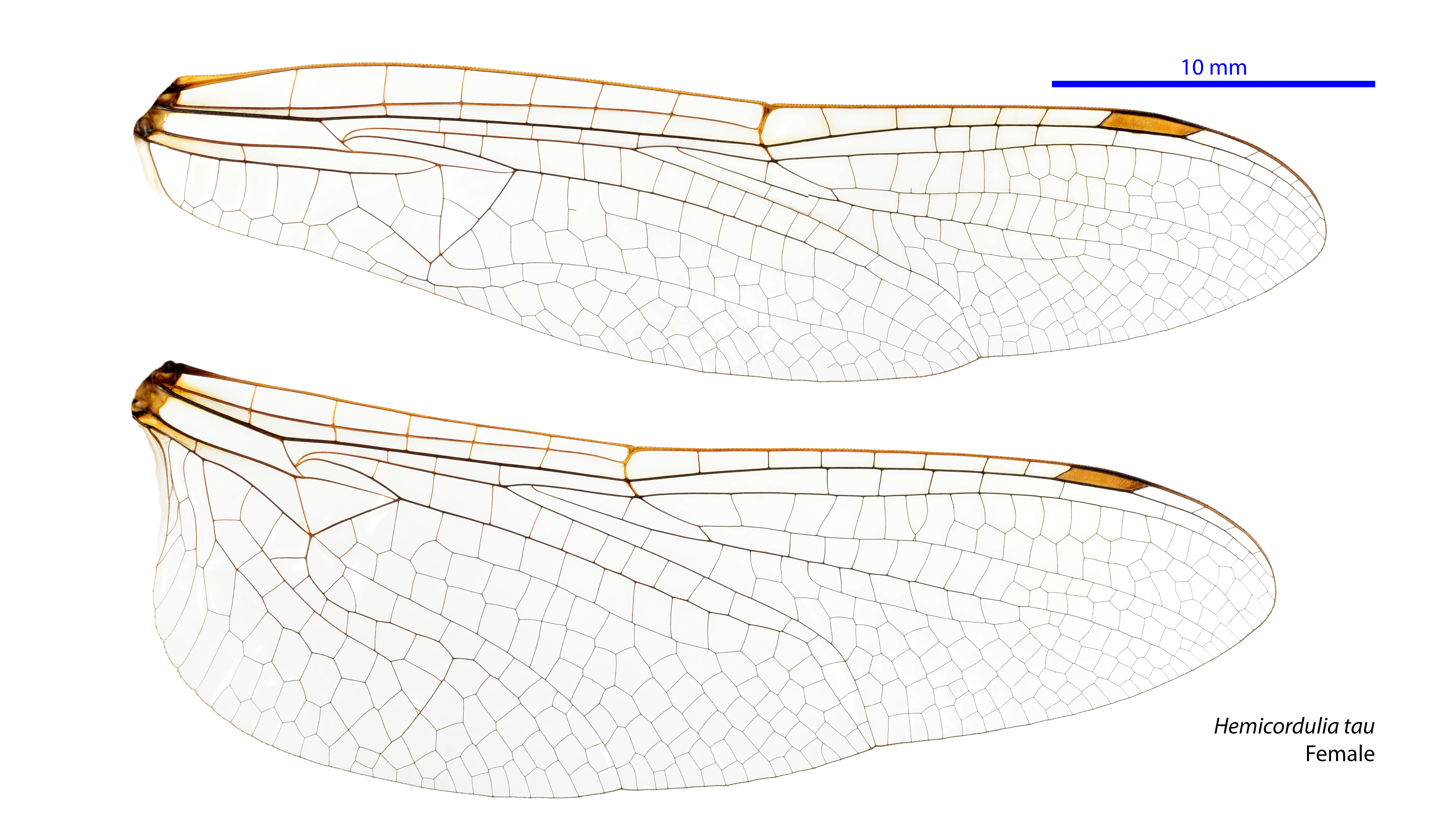
Female wings

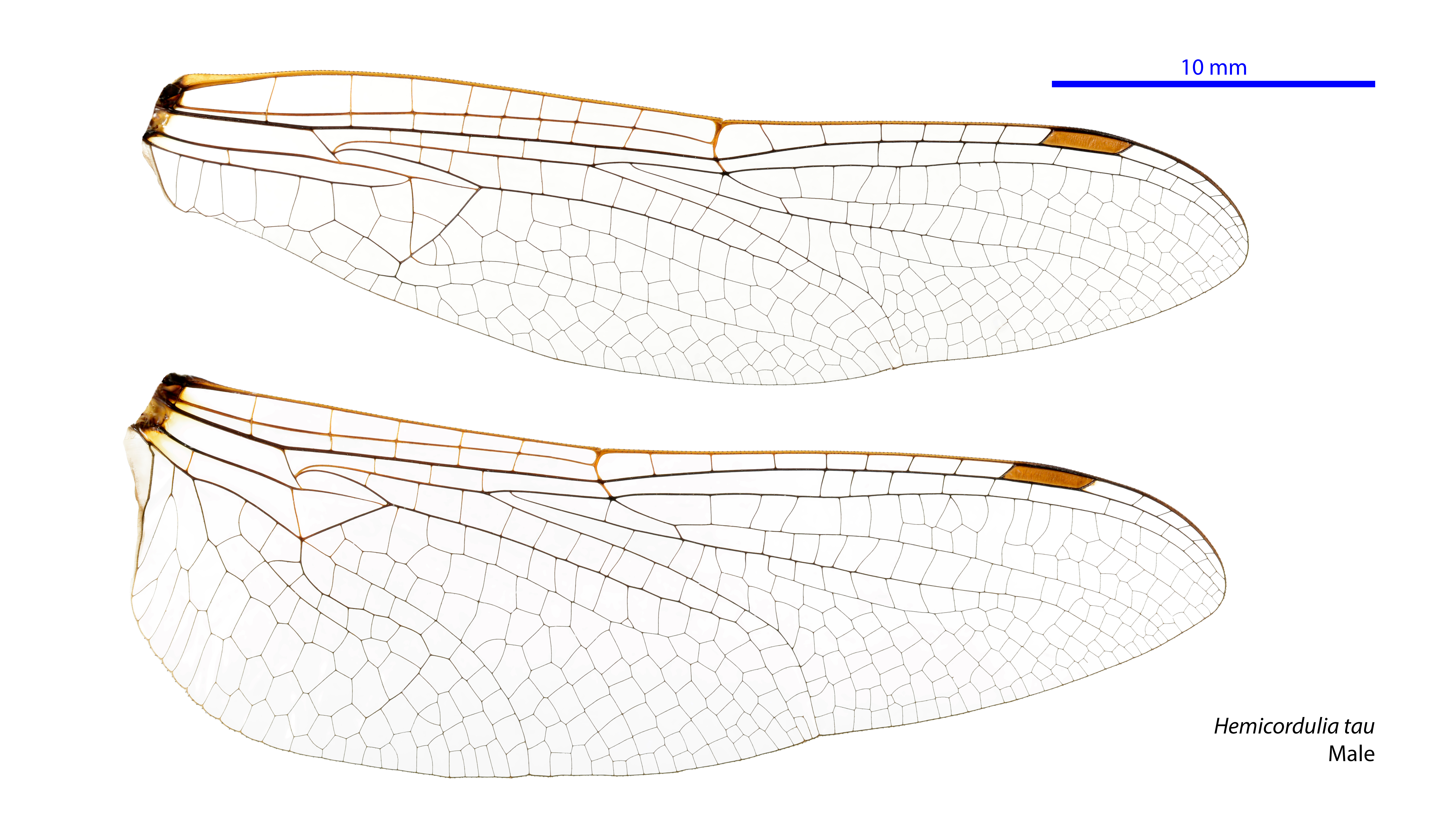
Male wings

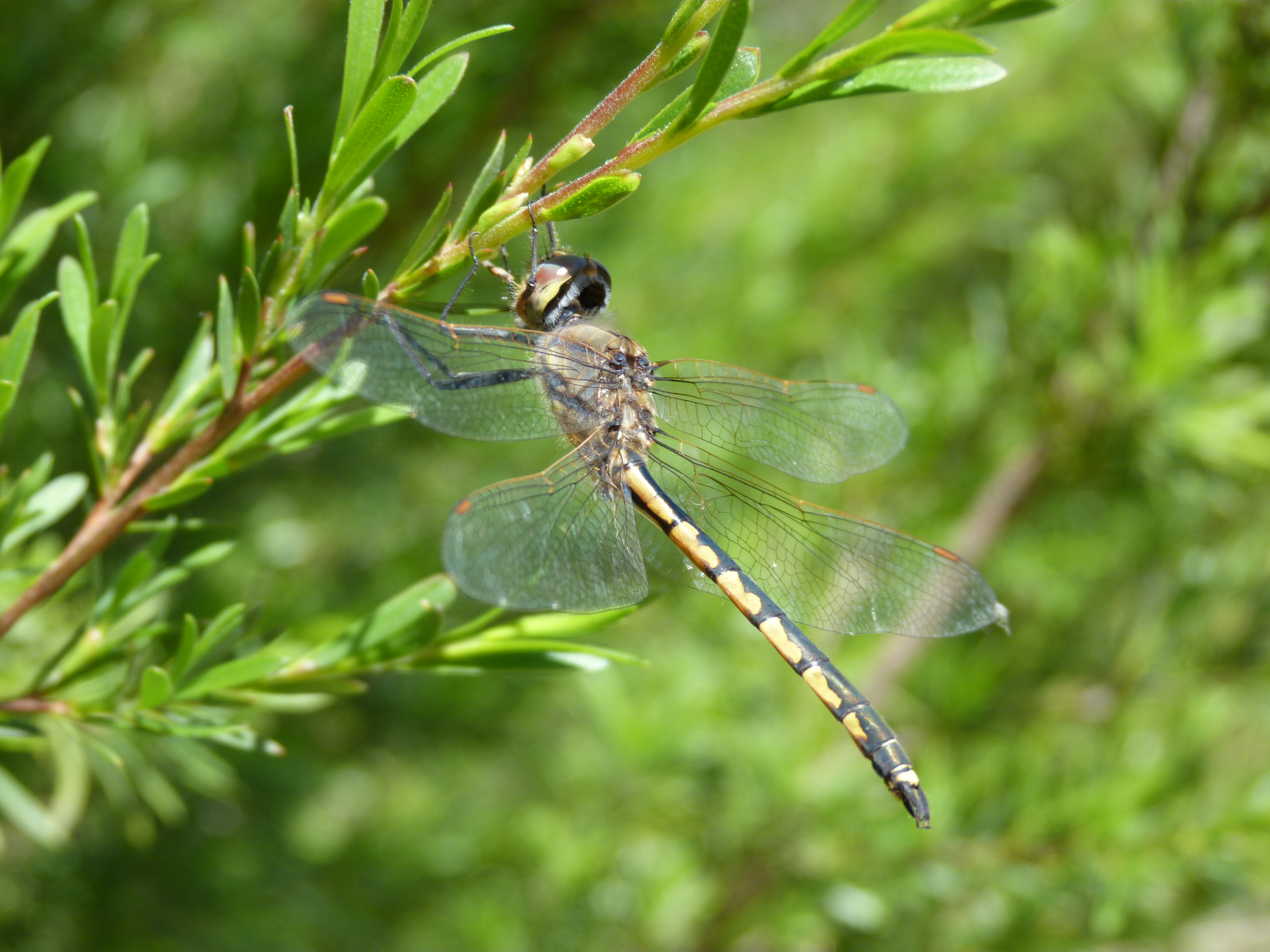
Hemicordulia tau

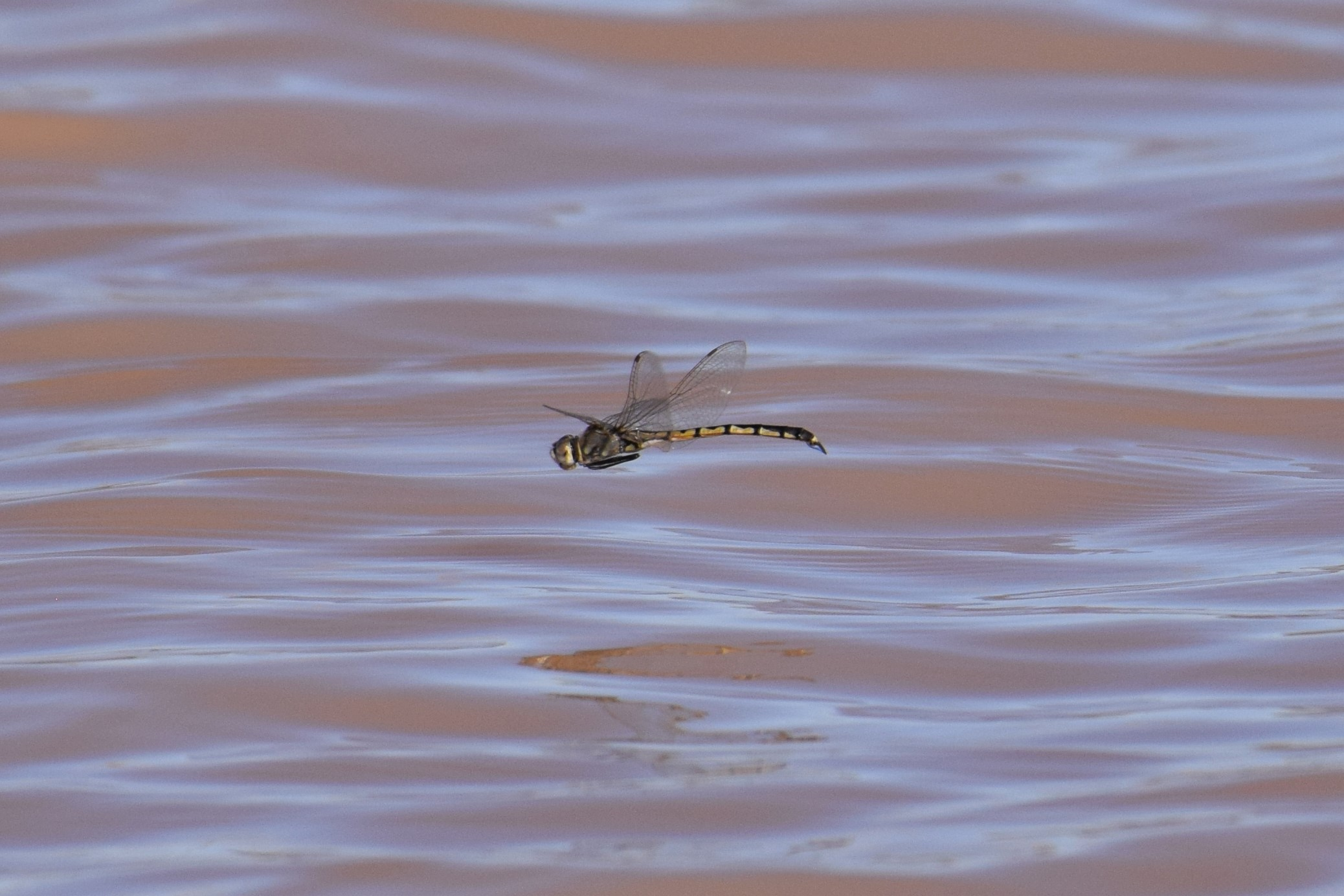
Hemicordulia tau in flight

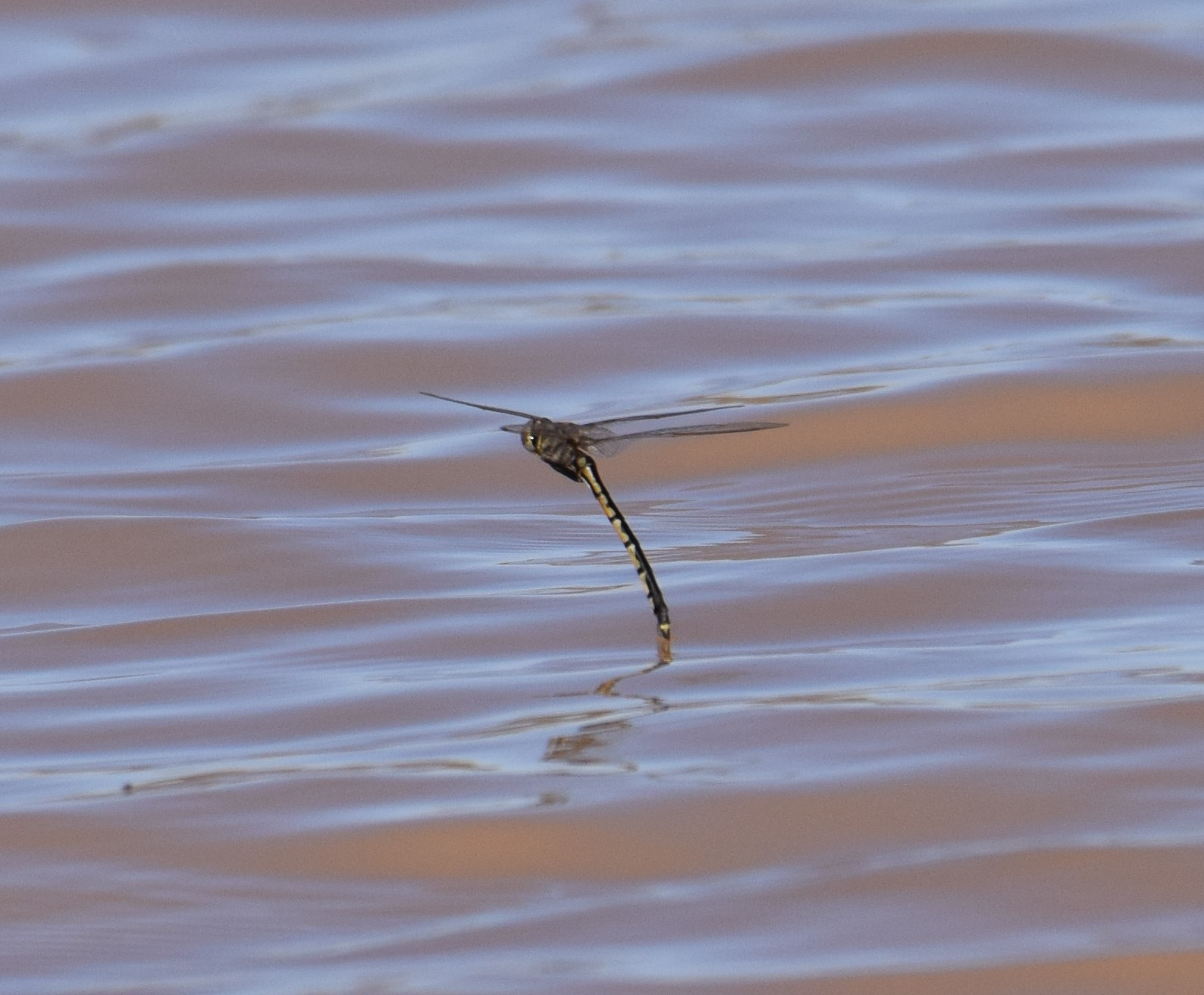
Hemicordulia tau dipping tail

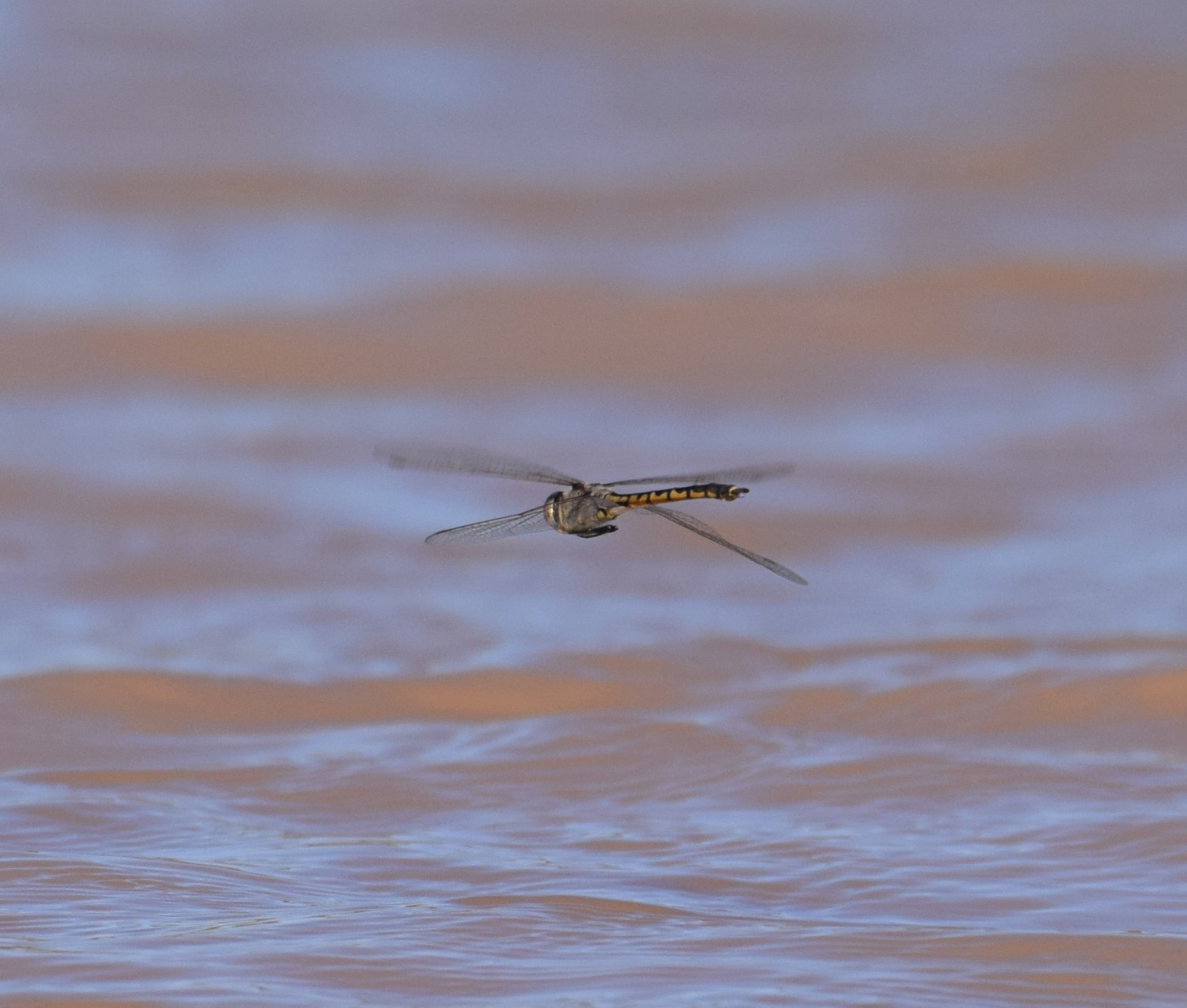
Hemicordulia tau
