= Becquerelia =

Becquerelia may refer to:

- Becquerelia (insect), a genus of fossil insects in the family Spilapteridae
- Becquerelia (plant), a genus of plants in the family Cyperaceae
