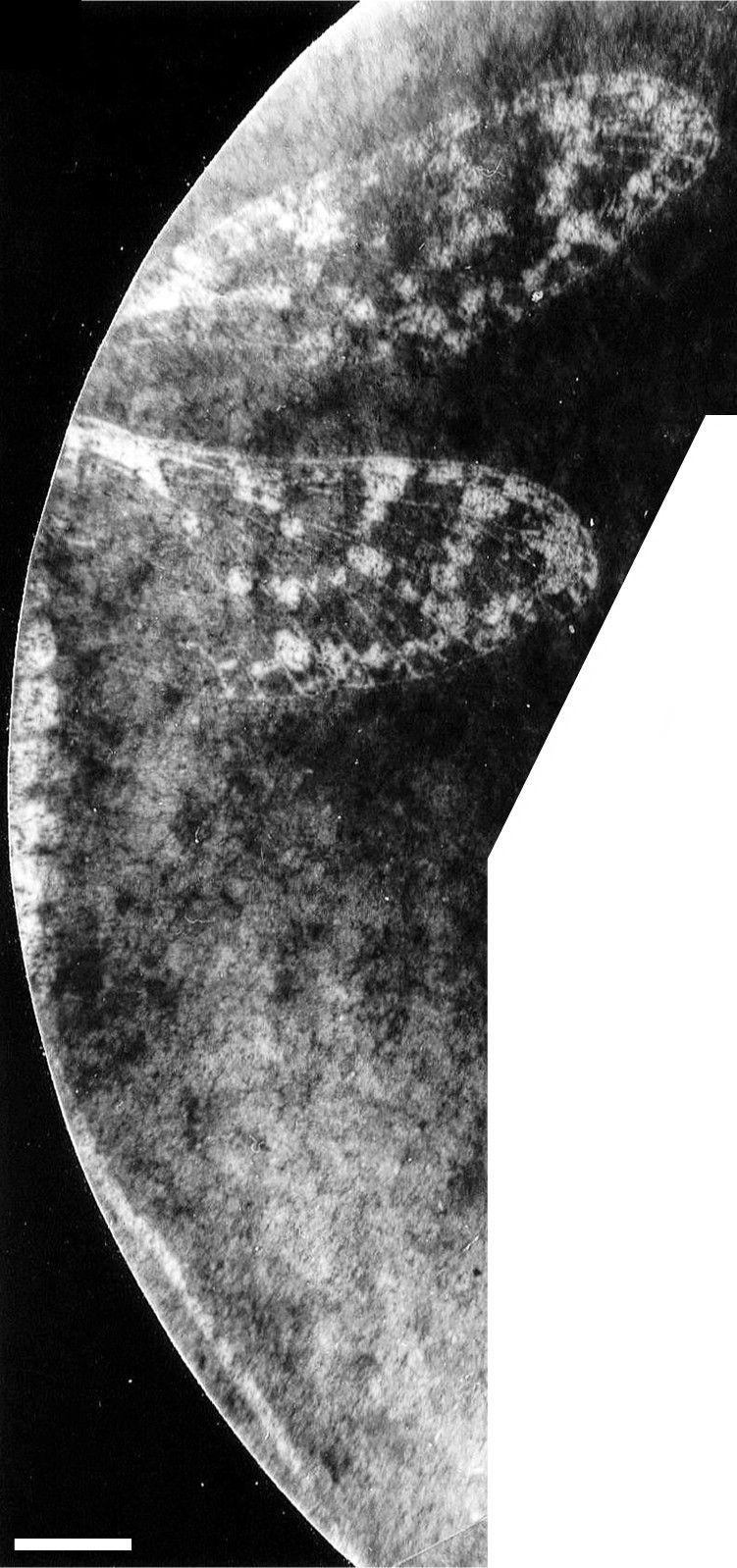

Scientific classification
- Kingdom: Animalia
- Phylum: Arthropoda
- Clade: Pancrustacea
- Class: Insecta
- Order: †Palaeodictyoptera
- Family: †Spilapteridae
- Genus: †Delitzschala; Brauckmann et Schneider, 1996
- Species: †D. bitterfeldensis

Binomial name
- †Delitzschala bitterfeldensis Brauckmann et Schneider, 1996

= Delitzschala =

Delitzschala Temporal range: Namurian

Extinct genus of insects

Delitzschala is an extinct palaeodictyopteran, the oldest known to science. It was discovered by two German entomologists in 1996. Delitzschala had a wingspan of just 2½ cm (1 in) and an irregular pattern of coloured spots on its wings. Although it was from Middle Carboniferous (Namurian), these spots were still visible in the fossil. It is possible that this camouflaged the animal, as it may have rested with its wings open as many modern-day insects do.
