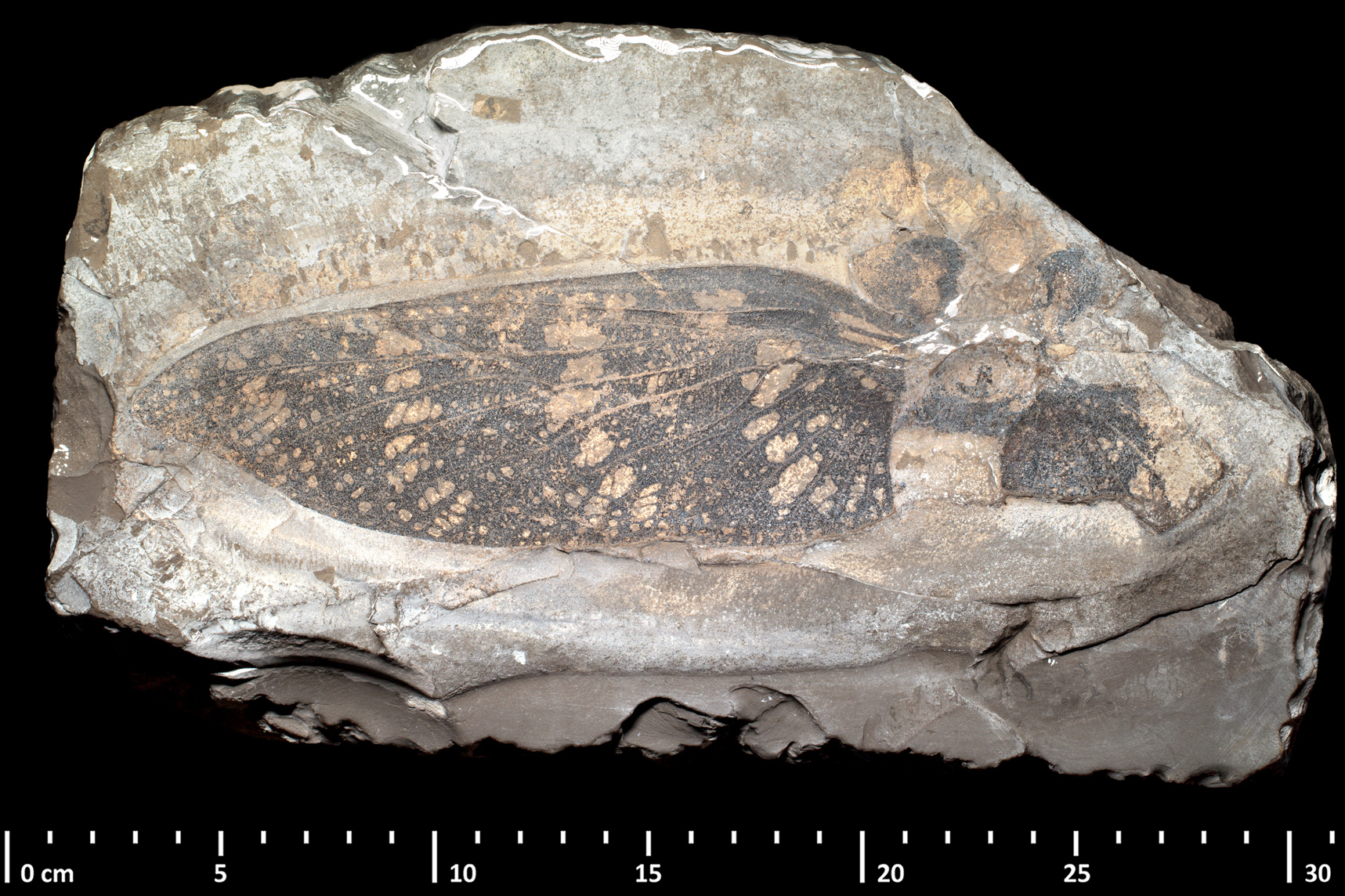
- Homoioptera gigantea specimen from the Auvergne

Scientific classification
- Kingdom: Animalia
- Phylum: Arthropoda
- Clade: Pancrustacea
- Class: Insecta
- Order: †Palaeodictyoptera
- Family: †Homoiopteridae
- Genus: †Homoioptera; Brongniart, 1894

Synonyms
- Anthracentomon Handlirsch, 1904; Homoeophlebia Handlirsch, 1906

= Homoioptera =

Homoioptera Temporal range: 314.6–298.9 Ma Carboniferous

Extinct genus of insects

Homoioptera is an extinct genus of winged insects from the Upper Carboniferous of Europe.

It contains the following species:

- †H. gigantea Agnus, 1902
- †H. kortumi Brauckmann and Herd, 2002
- †H. latipenne (Handlirsch, 1904)
- †H. vorhallensis Brauckmann and Koch, 1982
- †H. woodwardi Brongniart, 1890
