= Spilapteroidea =

Spilapteroidea Temporal range: Early Carboniferous

Scientific classification
- Kingdom: Animalia
- Phylum: Arthropoda
- Class: Insecta
- Order: †Palaeodictyoptera
- Superfamily: †Spilapteroidea

Family
- †Fouqueidae; †Mecynostomatidae; †Spilapteridae

Extinct superfamily of insects

Spilapteroidea is an extinct superfamily of palaeodictyopterans.
