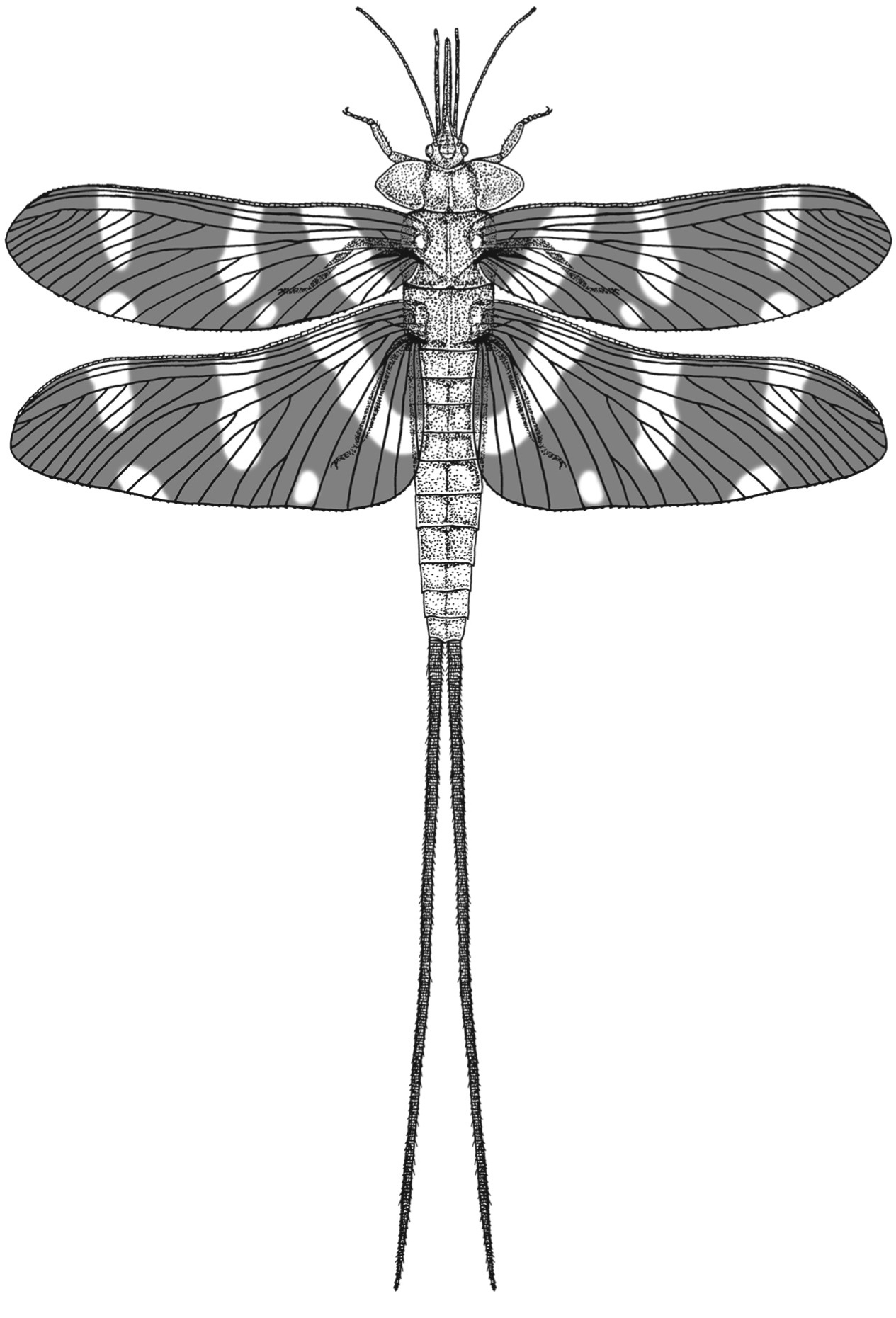
- Reconstruction of Dunbaria fasciipennis

Scientific classification
- Kingdom: Animalia
- Phylum: Arthropoda
- Clade: Pancrustacea
- Class: Insecta
- Subclass: Pterygota
- Superorder: †Palaeodictyopterida
- Order: †Palaeodictyoptera; Goldenberg, 1877

Taxa
- See Taxonomy

= Palaeodictyoptera =

Palaeodictyoptera Temporal range: Carboniferous, Late Mississippian (Arnsbergian)–Permian, Lopingian (Wuchiapingian)

Extinct order of insects

The Palaeodictyoptera are an extinct order of medium-sized to very large, primitive Palaeozoic paleopterous insects. They are informative about the evolution of wings in insects.

== Overview ==
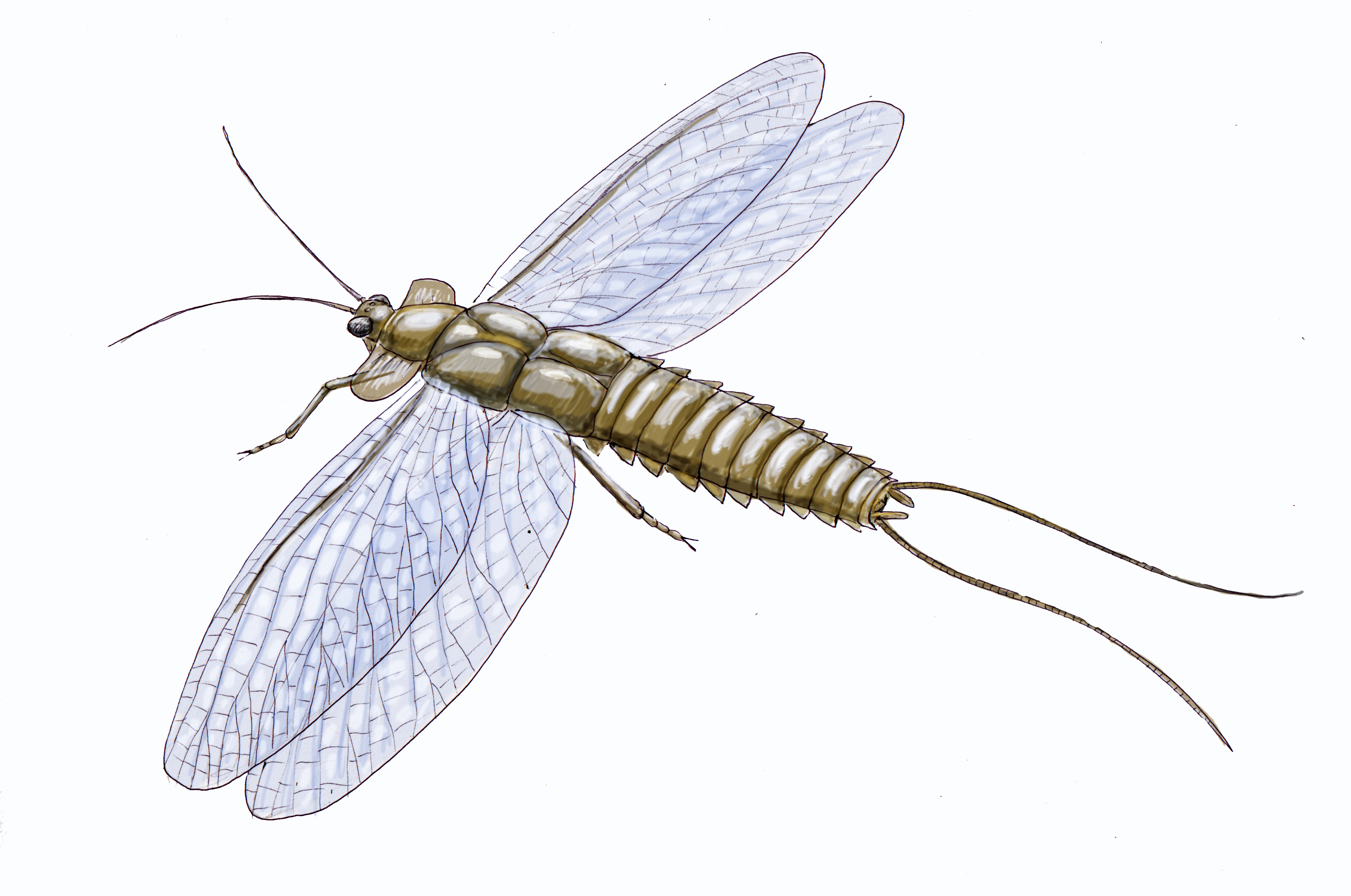
Restoration of Mazothairos

They were characterized by beak-like mouthparts, used to pierce plant tissues for feeding. There is a similarity between their fore- and hindwings, and an additional pair of winglets on the prothorax, in front of the first pair of wings. They are known as "six-winged insects" because of the presence of a pair of wings on each of the thoracic segments. Their winglets provide clues to the origins of the first insect wings.

The mouthparts were elongated, and included sharp piercing stylets, and possibly a sucking pump-like organ. Unlike modern sucking insects, such as the Hemipterans, the mouthparts were held vertically below the head, or projected forwards. They probably used these organs to suck juices from plants, although some may have been ectoparasites, or predators.

Some types attained huge size. For example, Mazothairos is estimated to have a wingspan of about 55 centimetres (22 in). Another distinctive feature was the presence of unusually long cerci, about twice the length of the abdomen.

The Palaeodictyoptera are a paraphyletic assemblage of basal palaeodictyopteroidean insects, rather than a clade, because they gave rise to other insect orders. They range in time from the Middle Carboniferous (late Serpukhovian or early Bashkirian in age) to the late Permian.

== Taxonomy ==
The following taxa are recognized as being included in the order Palaeodictyoptera:

- Suborder †Dictyoneurina Handlirsch 1906
  - Superfamily †Calvertielloidea Martynov 1932
    - Family †Calvertiellidae Martynov 1931
      - Genus †Calvertiella Tillyard 1925
      - Genus †Carrizopteryx Kukalová-Peck 1976
      - Genus †Lodetiella Béthoux et al. 2007
      - Genus †Moravia Kukalová 1964
      - Genus †Moraviptera Kukalová 1955
      - Genus †Sharovia Sinitshenkova 1977
      - Genus †Xiaheyanella Fu et al. 2015
  - Superfamily †Dictyoneuroidea Handlirsch 1906
    - Family †Dictyoneuridae Handlirsch 1906
      - Genus †Arltia Guthörl 1934
      - Genus †Cleffia Guthörl 1931
      - Genus †Dictyoneura Goldenberg 1854
      - Genus †Dictyoneurula Handlirsch 1906
      - Genus †Goldenbergia Scudder 1885
      - Genus †Hongius Özdikmen 2008
      - Genus †Kallenbergia Guthörl 1930
      - Genus †Macrodictya Guthörl 1940
      - Genus †Microdictya Brongniart 1894
      - Genus †Polioptenus Scudder 1885
      - Genus †Rotundopteris Guthörl 1940
      - Genus †Saarodictyum Guthörl 1939
      - Genus †Sagenoptera Handlirsch 1906
      - Genus †Schmidtopteron Brauckmann and Hahn 1978
      - Genus †Siberiodictya Sharov and Sinitshenkova 1977
      - Genus †Stenodictya Brongniart 1894
      - Genus †Stenodictyoneura Leriche 1911
      - Genus †Stilbocrocis Handlirsch 1906
    - Genus †Titanodictya Handlirsch 1906
- Suborder †Frankenholziina Guthörl 1962
  - Family †Hanidae Kukalová-Peck 1975
    - Genus †Forcynthia Sinitshenkova 2004
    - Genus †Hana Kukalová-Peck 1975

Superfamilies incertae sedis

- Superfamily †Breyerioidea Handlirsch 1906
  - Family †Breyeriidae Handlirsch 1906
    - Genus †Aviobreyeria Prokop et al. 2013
    - Genus †Breyeria de Borre 1875
    - Genus †Hasala Brauckmann 1995
    - Genus †Jugobreyeria Brauckmann et al. 1985
    - Genus †Megaptiloides Handlirsch 1906
    - Genus †Stobbsia Handlirsch 1908
    - Genus †Vernooijia Prokop et al. 2018
  - Family †Cryptoveniidae Bolton 1912
    - Genus †Cryptovenia Bolton 1912
- Superfamily †Eugereonoidea Sinitshenkova 2002
  - Family †Archaemegaptilidae Handlirsch 1919
    - Genus †Archaemegaptilus Meunier 1908
    - Genus †Haseneura Rosová et al. 2024
    - Genus †Osnabrugapteron Rosová et al. 2022
  - Family †Eugereonidae Handlirsch 1906
    - Genus †Dictyoptilus Brongniart 1894
    - Genus †Eugereon Dohrn 1866
    - Genus †Peromaptera Brongniart 1894
    - Genus †Sandiella Carpenter 1970
    - Genus †Valdeania Teixeira 1941
  - Family †Graphiptilidae Handlirsch 1906
    - Genus †Graphiptilus Brongniart 1894
    - Genus †Patteiskya Laurentiaux 1958
    - Genus †Rhabdoptilus Brongniart 1894
  - Family †Jongmansiidae Laurentiaux 1950
    - Genus †Jongmansia Laurentiaux 1950
    - Genus †Katosaxoniapteron Prokop et al. 2023
  - Family †Lithomanteidae Handlirsch 1906
    - Genus †Archaeophasma Matthew 1910
    - Genus †Catadyesthus Handlirsch 1906
    - Genus †Dyscritus Scudder 1868
    - Genus †Lithomantis Woodward 1876
    - Genus †Lusiella Laurentiaux and Teixeira 1958
  - Family †Lycocercidae Handlirsch 1906
    - Genus †Apopappus Handlirsch 1906
    - Genus †Lycocercus Handlirsch 1906
    - Genus †Lycodemas Carpenter and Richardson 1971
    - Genus †Lycodus Carpenter 1992
    - Genus †Madera Carpenter 1970
    - Genus †Notorachis Carpenter and Richardson 1971
  - Family †Namuroningxiidae Prokop and Ren 2007
    - Genus †Namuroningxia Prokop and Ren 2007
  - Family †Polycreagridae Handlirsch 1906
    - Genus †Polycreagra Handlirsch 1906
  - Family †Protagriidae Handlirsch 1906
    - Genus †Protagrion Brongniart 1894
  - Family †Synarmogidae Handlirsch 1910
    - Genus †Synarmoge Handlirsch 1910
  - Family †Tchirkovaeidae Sinitshenkova 1979
    - Genus †Paimbia Sinitshenkova 1979
    - Genus †Tchirkovaea Zalessky 1931
- Superfamily †Spilapteroidea Brongniart 1894
  - Family †Fouqueidae Handlirsch 1906
    - Genus †Fouquea Brongniart 1894
    - Genus †Neofouquea Carpenter 1967
  - Family †Mecynostomatidae Kukalová 1969
    - Genus †Mecynostomata Metcalf 1952
  - Family †Spilapteridae Brongniart 1894
    - Genus †Abaptilon Zalessky 1946
    - Genus †Baeoneura Sinitshenkova 1977
    - Genus †Becquerelia Brongniart 1894
    - Genus †Bizarrea Prokop et al. 2015
    - Genus †Delitzschala Brauckmann and Schneider 1996
    - Genus †Dunbaria Tillyard 1924
    - Genus †Epitethe Handlirsch 1906
    - Genus †Epithele Handlirsch 1906
    - Genus †Homaloneura Brongniart 1885
    - Genus †Lamproptilia Brongniart 1885
    - Genus †Mcluckiepteron Richardson 1956
    - Genus †Neuburgia Martynov 1930
    - Genus †Palaeoptilus Brongniart 1894
    - Genus †Paradunbaria Sharov and Sinitshenkova 1977
    - Genus †Permiakovia Martynov 1940
    - Genus †Saxonyptilus Rosová et al. 2022
    - Genus †Sinodunbaria Li et al. 2013
    - Genus †Spilaptera Brongniart 1885
    - Genus †Spiloptilus Handlirsch 1906
    - Genus †Tectoptilus Kukalová 1969
    - Genus †Tytthospilaptera Liu et al. 2015
    - Genus †Vorkutoneura Sinitshenkova 1977

Families incertae sedis

- Family †Elmoboriidae Carpenter 1976
  - Genus †Elmoboria Carpenter 1976
  - Genus †Oboria Kukalová 1960
- Family †Eubleptidae Handlirsch 1906
  - Genus †Eubleptus Handlirsch 1906
- Family †Homoiopteridae Handlirsch 1906
  - Genus †Adolarryia Kukalová-Peck and Richardson 1983
  - Genus †Ametretus Handlirsch 1911
  - Genus †Amousus Handlirsch 1911
  - Genus †Anglopterum Prokop et al. 2006
  - Genus †Boltonia Pruvost 1919
  - Genus †Homoioptera Brongniart 1894
  - Genus †Larryia Kukalová-Peck and Richardson 1983
  - Genus †Mazonopterum Kukalová-Peck and Richardson 1983
  - Genus †Mazothairos Kukalová-Peck and Richardson 1983
  - Genus †Ostrava Kukalová 1960
  - Genus †Paraostrava Prokop and Nel 2004
  - Genus †Parathesoneura Sinitshenkova 1977
  - Genus †Pharciphyzelus Beckemeyer and Engel 2011
  - Genus †Scepasma Handlirsch 1911
  - Genus †Thesoneura Carpenter 1943
  - Genus †Turneropterum Kukalová-Peck and Richardson 1983
- Family †Homothetidae Scudder 1885
  - Genus †Homothetus Scudder 1867
- Family †Megaptilidae Handlirsch 1906
  - Genus †Lithoptilus Lameere 1917
  - Genus †Megaptilus Brongniart 1885
- Family †Psychroptilidae Riek 1976
  - Genus †Psychroptilus Riek 1976
- Family †Straeleniellidae Laurentiaux-Vieira and Laurentiaux 1986
  - Genus †Straeleniella Laurentiaux-Vieira and Laurentiaux 1986

Genera incertae sedis

- Genus †Achaeoptilus Scudder 1881
- Genus †Aenigmatopsis Handlirsch 1937
- Genus †Althansia Guthörl 1934
- Genus †Anagesthes Handlirsch 1906
- Genus †Anthracosta Pruvost 1930
- Genus †Asiodictya Rohdendorf 1961
- Genus †Bathytaptus Handlirsch 1906
- Genus †Bojoptera Kukalová 1958
- Genus †Brongniartites Handlirsch 1919
- Genus †Brongniartula Handlirsch 1919
- Genus †Commentryites Handlirsch 1922
- Genus †Compsoneura Brongniart 1894
- Genus †Delafondia Langiaux and Parriat 1975
- Genus †Diexodus Handlirsch 1911
- Genus †Eumecoptera Handlirsch 1906
- Genus †Eurydictyella Carpenter 1986
- Genus †Eurythmopteryx Handlirsch 1906
- Genus †Gegenemene Handlirsch 1906
- Genus †Haplophlebium Scudder 1867
- Genus †Heolus Handlirsch 1906
- Genus †Idoptilus Wootton 1972
- Genus †Kansasia Tillyard 1937
- Genus †Mammia Handlirsch 1906
- Genus †Mecynoptera Handlirsch 1904
- Genus †Mecynostomites Handlirsch 1919
- Genus †Monsteropterum Kukalová-Peck 1972
- Genus †Palaiotaptus Handlirsch 1906
- Genus †Palapteris Guthörl 1940
- Genus †Paraboltonia Handlirsch 1922
- Genus †Paramecynostoma Handlirsch 1919
- Genus †Paramegaptilus Handlirsch 1906
- Genus †Platephemera Scudder 1867
- Genus †Propalingenia Handlirsch 1906
- Genus †Pseudomecynostoma Handlirsch 1919
- Genus †Pteronidia Bolton 1912
- Genus †Pyebrodia Brauckmann and Herd 2002
- Genus †Rochdalia Woodward 1913
- Genus †Saarlandia Guthörl 1930
- Genus †Sabitaptus Pruvost 1930
- Genus †Schedoneura Carpenter 1963
- Genus †Severinopsis Kukalová 1958
- Genus †Synaptoneura Pruvost 1919
- Genus †Titanophasma Brongniart 1882
- Genus †Turnbullia Richardson 1956
