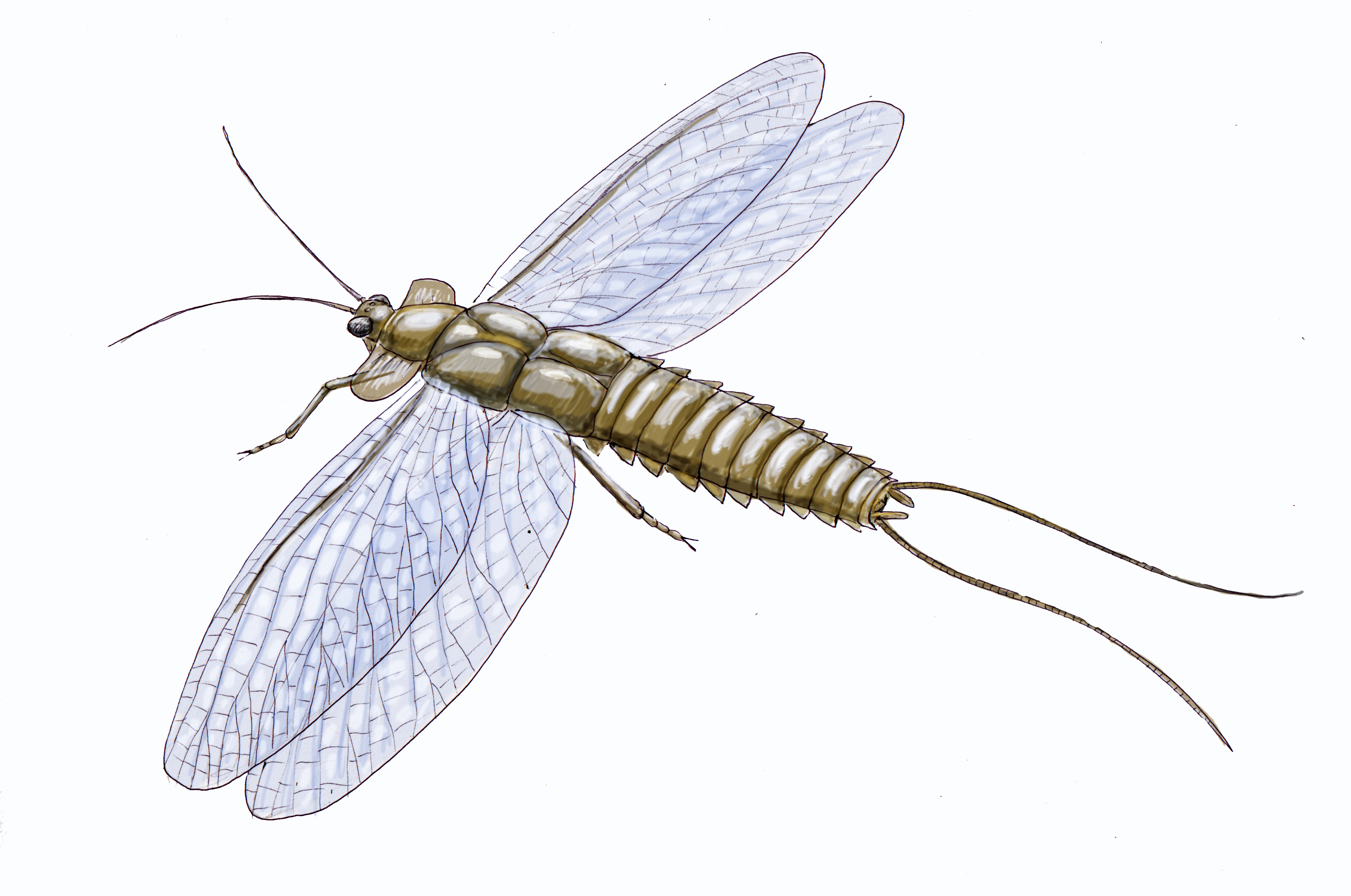
- Speculative reconstruction of Mazothairos enormis

Scientific classification
- Kingdom: Animalia
- Phylum: Arthropoda
- Clade: Pancrustacea
- Class: Insecta
- Order: †Palaeodictyoptera
- Family: †Homoiopteridae
- Genus: †Mazothairos; Kukalová-Peck & Richardson, 1983
- Species: †M. enormis

Binomial name
- †Mazothairos enormis Kukalová-Peck & Richardson, 1983

= Mazothairos =

Mazothairos Temporal range: 309 Ma

Extinct insect genus

Mazothairos (from Mazo, derived from its location of Mazon Creek and θαιρός, thairos, meaning 'hinge' in Greek) is an extinct genus of insect that lived during the Carboniferous period. It was a member of the order Palaeodictyoptera, and is only known from a single fossil composed of a segment of the tergum and some surrounding body parts. It is estimated to have had a wingspan of around 56 centimeters, making it one of the largest-known insects, similar in size to the largest members of the order Meganisoptera, such as Meganeura and Meganeuropsis.

As the largest representative of Palaeodictyoptera, it is believed to have had specialized sucking mouthparts, used to pierce plant tissues and drink their liquids, similarly to some of its relatives. It is also sometimes assumed to have had a pair of winglets on the prothorax in front of its first pair of wings (which give its order the epithet of "six-winged insects"), but the very fragmentary nature of its holotype specimen makes their presence difficult to verify.

Mazothairos lived in the Mazon Creek fossil beds in modern-day Illinois, a lagerstätte formed approximately 309 million years ago during the Pennsylvanian epoch of the Carboniferous period, which is thought to have been a part of a river delta system and have had a tropical climate.

== See also ==
- Palaeodictyopteroidea
- Meganeura
