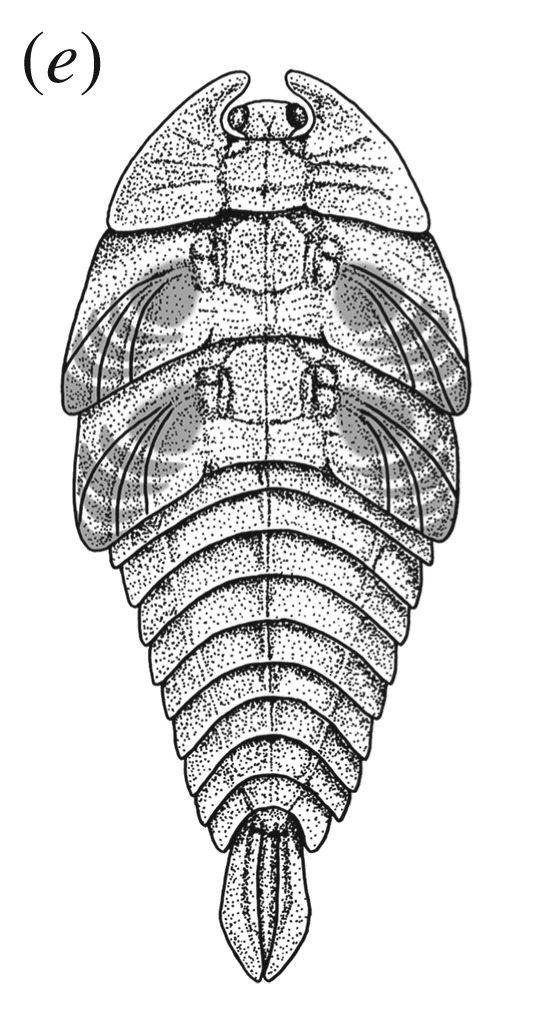
- Illustration of the habitus of specimen GLAHM A.2680a, a larval exuvia of an early instar of Idoptilus sp.

Scientific classification
- Kingdom: Animalia
- Phylum: Arthropoda
- Class: Insecta
- Order: †Palaeodictyoptera
- Family: †incertae sedis
- Genus: †Idoptilus; Wootton, 1972

Type species
- †Idoptilus onisciformis Wootton, 1972

Species
- †I. onisciformis Wootton, 1972; †I. peachii (Woodward 1887b)

= Idoptilus =

Idoptilus Temporal range: Carboniferous (Westphalian B)

Extinct genus of insects

Idoptilus is an extinct genus of palaeodictyopterans known from the Westphalian B subage of the United Kingdom. All specimens attributed to the genus are interpreted as juvenile stages, referred to as either larvae or nymphs. It contains two described species, Idoptilus onisciformis, known from the Round Green open cast mine, Stainborough (Barnsley, Yorkshire, England), and Idoptilus peachii, known from Greenhill Quarry, Kilmaurs (Ayrshire, Scotland). A specimen attributed to Idoptilus sp. is also known from the same site as I. onisciformis.
