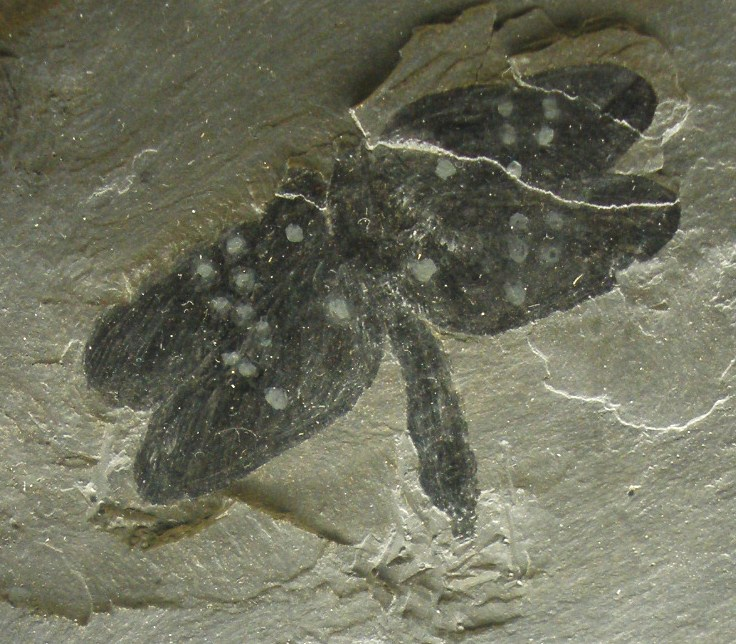
- Homaloneura ligeia fossil

Scientific classification
- Kingdom: Animalia
- Phylum: Arthropoda
- Class: Insecta
- Order: †Palaeodictyoptera
- Superfamily: †Spilapteroidea
- Family: †Spilapteridae

Genera
- See text

= Spilapteridae =

Spilapteridae Temporal range: Early Carboniferous

Extinct family of insects

Spilapteridae is an extinct family of palaeodictyopterans. It is regarded as one of the most species-rich of its order.

== Subdivisions ==
Subtaxa listed are genera, and all are extinct, unless otherwise noted.

- Abaptilon
- Baeoneura
- Becquerelia
- Bizarrea
- Boltoniella
- Delitzschala
- Dunbaria
- Epitethe
- Epithele
- Homaloneura
- Lamproptilia
- Mcluckiepteron
- Neuburgia
- Palaeoneuriinae (subfamily)
- Palaeoptilus
- Paradunbaria
- Permiakovia
- Sinodunbaria
- Spilaptera
- Spiloptilus
- Tectoptilus
- Tytthospilaptera
- Vorkutoneura
