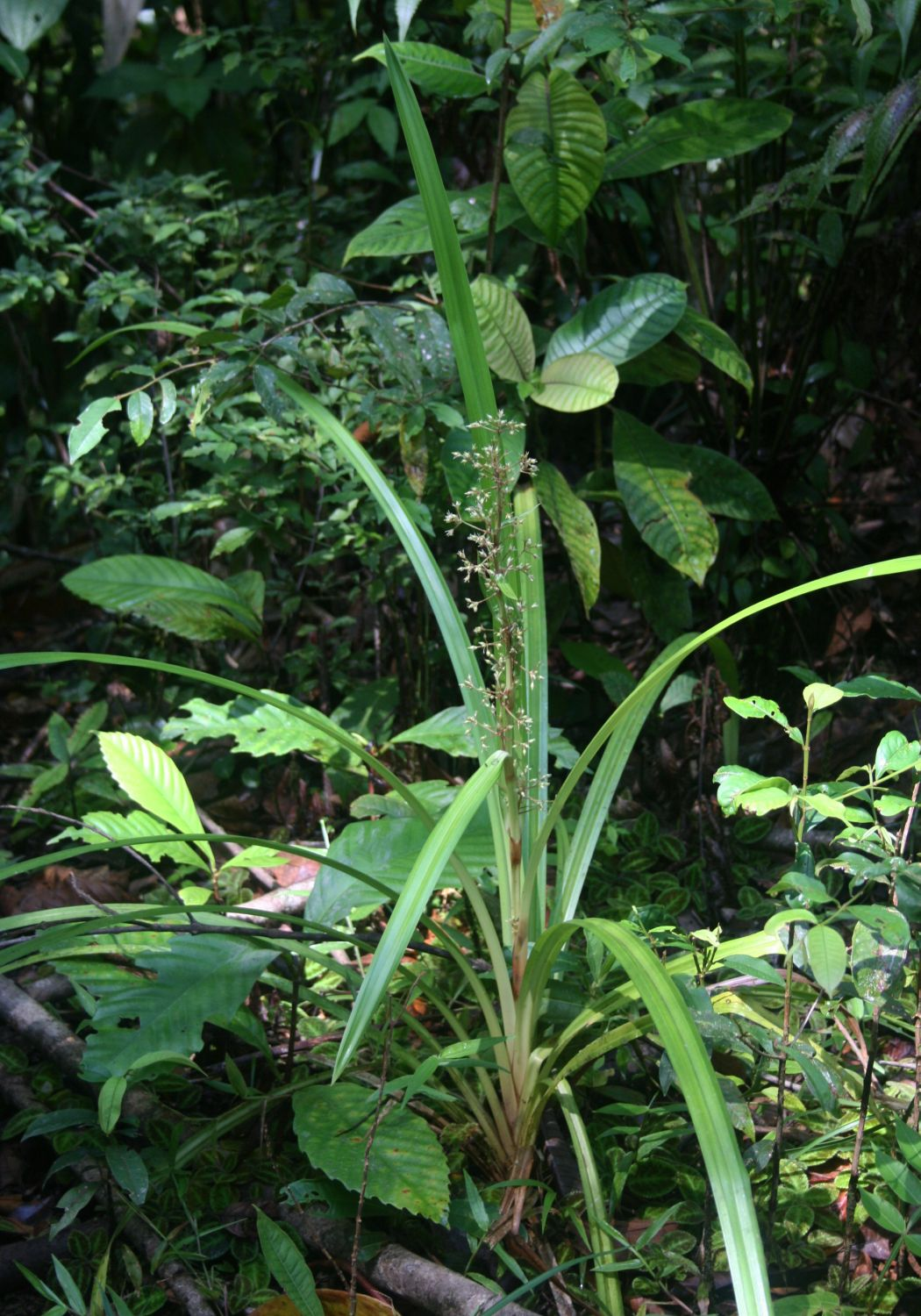
- Becquerelia cymosa

Scientific classification
- Kingdom: Plantae
- Clade: Tracheophytes
- Clade: Angiosperms
- Clade: Monocots
- Clade: Commelinids
- Order: Poales
- Family: Cyperaceae
- Genus: Becquerelia; Brongn.

= Becquerelia (plant) =

Genus of flowering plants

Becquerelia is a genus of flowering plants belonging to the family Cyperaceae.

Its native range is Tropical America.

Species:

- Becquerelia clarkei T.Koyama
- Becquerelia cymosa Brongn.
- Becquerelia discolor Kunth
- Becquerelia merkeliana Nees
- Becquerelia muricata (Boeckeler) Nees
- Becquerelia tuberculata (Boeckeler) H.Pfeiff.
