= 2013 in paleoentomology =

This list of 2013 in paleoentomology records new fossil insect taxa that were described during the year, as well as documents significant paleoentomology discoveries and events which occurred during that year.

== Blattaria ==
Name	Novelty	Status	Authors	Age	Unit	Location	Notes	Images
Chilgatermes	Gen. et sp. nov.	Valid	Engel, Pan & Jacobs	Late Oligocene		Ethiopia	A termite. The type species is Chilgatermes diamatensis.	
Colorifuzia	Gen. et sp. nov	Valid	Wei, Liang & Ren	Middle Jurassic	Jiulongshan Formation	China	A fuziid cockroach. The type species is Colorifuzia agenora.	
Dazhublattella	Gen. et sp. nov.	Valid	Fang et al.	Late Triassic	Xujiahe Formation	China	A caloblattinid cockroach. The type species is Dazhublattella lini.	
Ergaula stonebut	Sp. nov	Valid	Vršanský et al.	Paleocene (Danian)		Russia	A corydiid cockroach, a species of Ergaula.	
Kinklidoblatta youhei	Sp. nov	Valid	Wei et al.	Carboniferous (Pennsylvanian)		China	A stem-dictyopteran, a species of Kinklidoblatta.	
Mieroblattina	Gen. et sp. nov	Valid	Vršanský & Makhoul	Late Cretaceous (Cenomanian)		Lebanon	A mesoblattinid cockroach. The type species is Mieroblattina pacis.	
Morphna paleo	Sp. nov	Valid	Vršanský et al.	Paleocene (Danian)		Russia	A blaberid cockroach, a species of Morphna.	
Nuurcala obesa	Sp. nov	Valid	Wang & Ren	Early Cretaceous	Yixian Formation	China	A caloblattinid cockroach.	
Perlucipecta	Gen. et 2 sp. nov	Valid	Wei & Ren	Early Cretaceous	Sinuiju Formation; Yixian Formation	China; North Korea	A mesoblattinid cockroach. The type species is P. aurea; genus also contains P. vrsanskyi.	

== Coleoptera ==
Name	Novelty	Status	Authors	Age	Unit	Location	Notes	Images
Aenigmocoleus uralensis	Sp. nov	Valid	Ponomarenko in Aristov et al.	Late Permian (possibly Vyatkian)		Russia	A rhombocoleid beetle.	
Ambraaltica	Gen. et sp. nov	Valid	Konstantinov & Bukejs in Bukejs & Konstantinov	Late Eocene	Baltic amber	Russia (Kaliningrad Oblast)	A flea beetle. The type species is Ambraaltica baltica.	
Antiphloeus	Gen. et sp. nov	Valid	Kirejtshuk & Nel	Early Eocene	Oise amber	France	A silvanid beetle. The type species is Antiphloeus stramineus.	
Archaeocallirhopalus	Gen. et sp. nov	Valid	Legalov	Eocene	Baltic amber	Europe	An entimine curculionid weevil. The type species is A. larssoni.	
Atomaria cretacea	Sp. nov	Valid	Cai & Wang	Early Cretaceous	Shixi Formation	China	An atomariine cryptophagid beetle. Originally described as a species of Atomaria. Moved to Shixitomaria cretacea in 2018.	
Atomaria gedanicola	Sp. nov	Valid	Lyubarsky & Perkovsky	Late Eocene	Baltic amber	Russia	An atomariine cryptophagid beetle	
Bicoleus	Gen. et 2 sp. nov	Valid	Ponomarenko in Aristov et al.	Permian (Severodvinian)		Russia	An asiocoleid beetle. The type species is B. kuplensis genus also contains B. laticella.	
Boleopsis	Gen. et sp. nov	Valid	Kirejtshuk & Nel	Early Eocene	Oise amber	France	A cleroid beetle related to Melyridae. The type species is B. polinae.	
Brachycamacus	Gen. et sp. nov	Valid	Poinar, Legalov & Brown	Cenozoic (definite age uncertain, estimates range from late Eocene to early Miocene)		Dominican Republic	An entimine curculionid weevil found in Dominican amber. The type species is Brachycamacus gyrommatus.	
Brochocoleus crowsonae	Sp. nov	Valid	Jarzembowski et al.	Early Cretaceous	Weald Clay Group	United Kingdom	An ommatine beetle. Originally described as a species of Brochocoleus; Kirejtshuk (2020) transferred this species to the genus Diluticupes.	
Brochocoleus keenani	Sp. nov	Valid	Jarzembowski et al.	Early Cretaceous	Weald Clay Group	United Kingdom	A beetle, a species of Brochocoleus.	
Brochocoleus maximus	Sp. nov	Valid	Jarzembowski et al.	Early Cretaceous	Purbeck Limestone Group	United Kingdom	A beetle, a species of Brochocoleus.	
Brochocoleus tobini	Sp. nov	Valid	Jarzembowski et al.	Early Cretaceous	Weald Clay Group	United Kingdom	A beetle, a species of Brochocoleus.	
Brochocoleus yangshuwanziensis	Sp. nov	Valid	Jarzembowski et al.	Early Cretaceous	Yixian Formation	China	An ommatine beetle. Originally described as a species of Brochocoleus; Kirejtshuk (2020) transferred this species to the genus Diluticupes.	
Carabilarva triassica	Sp. nov	Valid	Makarov & Prokin in Prokin et al.	Late Triassic (late Carnian)	Hassberge Formation	Germany	A member of Caraboidea, a species of Carabilarva.	
Ceutorhynchus succinus	Sp. nov	Valid	Legalov	Eocene		Europe	A baridine curculionid weevil found in Baltic amber, a species of Ceutorhynchus.	
Colaspoides eocenicus	Sp. nov	Valid	Moseyko & Kirejtshuk	Eocene		Europe (Baltic Sea coast)	A leaf beetle belonging to the subfamily Eumolpinae found in Baltic amber, a species of Colaspoides.	
Coleopsis	Gen. et sp. nov	Valid	Kirejtshuk et al.	Early Permian (Asselian or early Sakmarian)		Germany	The oldest definitive beetle. The type species is Coleopsis archaica.	
Cretalbiana	Gen. et 2 sp. nov	Valid	Alexeev	Early Cretaceous (Albian)		Russia	A buprestid beetle. Genus contains two species: Cretalbiana sukatshevae and C. major.	
Cretasyne	Gen. et 2 sp. nov	Valid	Yan, Wang & Zhang	Early Cretaceous	Yixian Formation	China	A lasiosynid beetle. Contains two species: Cretasyne lata and C. longa.	
Cretodascillus	Gen. et sp. nov	Valid	Jin et al.	Early Cretaceous	Yixian Formation	China	A dascillid dascilloid beetle. The type species is Cretodascillus sinensis.	
Cretodytes incertus	Sp. nov	Valid	Prokin et al.	Early Cretaceous	Doronino Formation	Russia	A dytiscid beetle, a species of Cretodytes.	
Cretoprionus	Gen. et sp. nov	Valid	Wang et al.	Early Cretaceous	Yixian Formation	China	A longhorn beetle. The type species is Cretoprionus liutiaogouensis.	
Cretoprosopus	Gen. et sp. nov	Valid	Solodovnikov & Yue in Solodovnikov et al.	Early Cretaceous	Yixian Formation	China	A rove beetle. The type species is C. problematicus.	
Cretoquedius distinctus	Sp. nov	Valid	Solodovnikov & Yue in Solodovnikov et al.	Early Cretaceous	Yixian Formation	China	A rove beetle.	
Cretoquedius dorsalis	Sp. nov	Valid	Solodovnikov & Yue in Solodovnikov et al.	Early Cretaceous	Yixian Formation	China	A rove beetle.	
Cretoquedius infractus	Sp. nov	Valid	Solodovnikov & Yue in Solodovnikov et al.	Early Cretaceous	Yixian Formation	China	A rove beetle.	
Dieneremia	Gen. et sp. nov	Valid	Reike, Alekseev & Bukejs	Eocene	Baltic amber	Russia (Kaliningrad Oblast)	A minute brown scavenger beetle. The type species is D. rueckeri.	
Discoclavata	Gen. et sp. nov	Valid	Poinar			Dominican Republic	A bostrichid beetle found in Dominican amber. The type species is Discoclavata dominicana.	
Durothorax	Gen. et sp. nov	Valid	Solodovnikov & Yue in Solodovnikov et al.	Early Cretaceous	Yixian Formation	China	A rove beetle. The type species is D. creticus.	
Electranthribus	Gen. et sp. nov	Valid	Legalov	Eocene		Europe	An anthribine anthribid weevil found in Baltic amber. The type species is Electranthribus zherikhini.	
Electronycha	Gen. et sp. nov	Valid	Kazantsev	Eocene	Baltic amber	Europe (Baltic Sea coast)	A soldier beetle. The type species is E. prussica.	
Electrosilis	Gen. et sp. nov	Valid	Kazantsev	Eocene	Baltic amber	Europe (Baltic Sea coast)	A soldier beetle. The type species is E. minuta.	
Eocaenonemonyx	Gen et sp nov	Valid	Eocene; Bridgerian	Green River Formation; Lake Unita	USA; Utah	An Eocaenonemonychini tribe cretonemonychine pine flower weevil. The type species is E. kuscheli		
Eoceneithycerus	Gen. et sp. nov	Valid	Legalov	Eocene; Ypresian	Okanagan Highlands; Klondike Mountain Formation	United States; Washington	A New York weevil relative The type species is E. carpenteri.	Eoceneithycerus carpenteri
Erunakicupes grossus	Sp. nov	Valid	Ponomarenko in Aristov et al.	Permian (Severodvinian)		Russia	A rhombocoleid beetle, a species of Erunakicupes.	
Falsotanaos	Gen. et sp. nov	Valid	Legalov	Late Cretaceous (Turonian)		Kazakhstan	A weevil belonging to the family Brentidae. The type species is Falsotanaos convexus.	
Fortishybosorus	Gen. et sp. nov	Valid	Yan, Bai & Ren	Early Cretaceous	Yixian Formation	China	A hybosorid beetle. The type species is Fortishybosorus ericeusicus.	
Haliplus cretaceus	Sp. nov	Valid	Prokin & Ponomarenko	Early Cretaceous		Mongolia	A haliplid beetle, a species of Haliplus.	
Heterothops cornelli	Sp. nov	Valid	Chatzimanolis & Engel	Miocene (Burdigalian)	Dominican amber	Dominican Republic	A rove beetle. Originally described as a species of Heterothops; subsequently transferred to the genus Chiquiticus.	
Heterothops infernalis	Sp. nov	Valid	Chatzimanolis & Engel	Miocene (Burdigalian)	Dominican amber	Dominican Republic	A rove beetle. Originally described as a species of Heterothops; subsequently transferred to the genus Chiquiticus.	
Holisus funeratus	Sp. nov	Valid	Chatzimanolis & Engel	Miocene (Burdigalian)	Dominican amber	Dominican Republic	A rove beetle.	
Hydrobiomorpha heeri	Sp. nov	Valid	Fikáček & Schmied	Late Miocene		Germany	A hydrophilid beetle, a species of Hydrobiomorpha.	
Juroglypholoma talbragarense	Sp. nov	Valid	Cai et al.	Late Jurassic	Talbragar Fish Bed	Australia	A rove beetle, a species of Juroglypholoma.	
Karakanocoleus mutovinensis	Sp. nov	Valid	Ponomarenko in Aristov et al.	Permian (Severodvinian)		Russia	A rhombocoleid beetle, a species of Karakanocoleus.	
Larvula triassica	Sp. nov	Valid	Prokin & Ponomarenko in Prokin et al.	Late Triassic (late Carnian)	Hassberge Formation	Germany	A member of Polyphaga of uncertain phylogenetic placement, a species of Larvula.	
Lepiceroides	Gen. et sp. nov	Junior homonym	Kirejtshuk & Poinar	Early Cretaceous		Myanmar	A lepicerid beetle. The type species is Lepiceroides pretiosus. The generic name turned out to be preoccupied by Lepiceroides Schedl (1957); Kirejtshuk (2017) coined a replacement name Lepichelus for the genus.	
Liadytes aspidytoides	Sp. nov	Valid	Prokin et al.	Late Jurassic		Mongolia	A liadytid beetle, a species of Liadytes.	
Liadyxianus	Gen. et sp. nov	Valid	Prokin et al.	Early Cretaceous	Yixian Formation	China	A dytiscid beetle. The type species is Liadyxianus kirejtshuki.	
Lissantauga	Gen. et sp. nov	Disputed	Poinar			Dominican Republic	A eucnemid beetle found in Dominican amber. The type species is Lissantauga epicrana. In subsequent publications the genus Lissantauga was argued to be a junior synonym of the genus Calyptocerus or the genus Otho, though the species L. epicrana was maintained as distinct within those genera.	
Longotanaos	Gen. et sp. nov	Valid	Legalov	Late Cretaceous (Turonian)		Kazakhstan	A weevil belonging to the family Brentidae. The type species is Longotanaos rasnitsyni.	
Mediumiuga	Gen. et sp. nov	Valid	Peris & Ruzzier	Early Cretaceous (Albian)		Spain	A mordellid beetle. The type species is Mediumiuga sinespinis.	
Megolisthaerus minor	Sp. nov	Valid	Cai & Huang	Early Cretaceous	Yixian Formation	China	A rove beetle, a species of Megolisthaerus.	
Mesoderus ovatus	Sp. nov	Valid	Prokin et al.	Early Cretaceous	Yixian Formation	China	A dytiscid beetle, a species of Mesoderus.	
Mesoderus punctatus	Sp. nov	Valid	Prokin et al.	Early Cretaceous	Yixian Formation	China	A dytiscid beetle, a species of Mesoderus.	
Mesodytes	Gen. et sp. nov	Valid	Prokin et al.	Early Cretaceous	Yixian Formation	China	A dytiscid beetle. The type species is Mesodytes rhantoides.	
Mesohypna	Gen. et sp. nov	Valid	Nikolajev & Ren	Early Cretaceous	Yixian Formation	China	A glaphyrid beetle. The type species is Mesohypna lopatini.	
Mesostaphylinus antiquus	Sp. nov	Valid	Solodovnikov & Yue in Solodovnikov et al.	Early Cretaceous	Yixian Formation	China	A rove beetle.	
Mesostaphylinus elongatus	Sp. nov	Valid	Solodovnikov & Yue in Solodovnikov et al.	Early Cretaceous	Yixian Formation	China	A rove beetle.	
Mesostaphylinus yixianus	Sp. nov	Valid	Solodovnikov & Yue in Solodovnikov et al.	Early Cretaceous	Yixian Formation	China	A rove beetle.	
Mimoplatycis	Gen. et sp. nov	Valid	Kazantsev	Eocene	Baltic amber Rovno amber	Denmark; Russia (Kaliningrad Oblast); Ukraine	A soldier beetle. The type species is M. notha.	
Mordellaria friedrichi	Sp. nov	Valid	Perkovsky & Odnosum	Late Eocene		Europe	A mordellid beetle found in Baltic amber, a species of Mordellaria.	
Neoxantholinus apolithomenus	Sp. nov	Valid	Chatzimanolis & Engel	Miocene (Burdigalian)	Dominican amber	Dominican Republic	A rove beetle.	
Okamninus	Gen. et sp. nov	Valid	Mynhardt & Philips	Early to middle Miocene (15–10 Ma)		Dominican Republic	A spider beetle found in Dominican amber. The type species is Okamninus annae.	
Palaeodytes baissiensis	Sp. nov	Valid	Prokin et al.	Early Cretaceous	Baissa locality	Russia	A dytiscid beetle, a species of Palaeodytes.	
Palaeophelypera	Gen. et sp. nov	Valid	Legalov	Eocene		Europe	An entimine curculionid weevil found in Baltic amber. The type species is Palaeophelypera kuscheli.	
Palaeorhopalotria	Gen. et sp. nov	Valid	Legalov	Late Eocene		France	An oxycorynine belid weevil. The type species is Palaeorhopalotria neli.	
Paleosorius	Gen. et sp. nov	Valid	Ortega-Blanco, Chatzimanolis & Engel in Ortega-Blanco et al.	Early Eocene		India	An osoriine rove beetle found in Cambay amber. The type species is Paleosorius cambayensis.	
Paleothius	Gen. et sp. nov	Valid	Solodovnikov & Yue in Solodovnikov et al.	Early Cretaceous	Yixian Formation	China	A rove beetle. The type species is P. gracilis.	
Paleowinus	Gen. et 5 sp. nov	Valid	Solodovnikov & Yue in Solodovnikov et al.	Early Cretaceous	Yixian Formation	China	A rove beetle. The type species is P. rex; genus also includes P. fossilis, P. ambiguus, P. mirabilis and P. chinensis.	
Permocupes latus	Sp. nov	Valid	Ponomarenko in Aristov et al.	Permian (Urzhumian)		Russia	A permocupedid beetle, a species of Permocupes.	
Permunda	Gen. et sp. nov	Valid	Ponomarenko & Volkov	Probably late Permian	Mal'tseva Formation	Russia	A member of the family Trachypachidae. The type species is P. nana.	
Petrodromeus	Gen. et comb. nov	Valid	Ponomarenko & Volkov	Probably late Permian	Mal'tseva Formation	Russia	A member of the family Trachypachidae. The type species is "Ademosynoides" asiaticus Martynov (1936). Ponomarenko & Volkov (2013) also described new species P. minor, but this species was subsequently transferred to the separate genus Apermunda.	
Phanaeus violetae	Sp. nov	Valid	Zunino	Late Pleistocene	Cangahua Formation	Ecuador	A species of Phanaeus.	
Philonthus hades	Sp. nov	Valid	Chatzimanolis & Engel	Miocene (Burdigalian)	Dominican amber	Dominican Republic	A rove beetle, a species of Philonthus.	
Philonthus rhadamanthus	Sp. nov	Valid	Chatzimanolis & Engel	Miocene (Burdigalian)	Dominican amber	Dominican Republic	A rove beetle, a species of Philonthus.	
Phloeocharis agerata	Sp. nov	Valid	Chatzimanolis, Newton & Engel in Chatzimanolis et al.	Late Cretaceous (Turonian)	New Jersey Amber	United States	A phloeocharine rove beetle, a species of Phloeocharis.	
Pleurambus	Gen. et sp. nov	Valid	Poinar & Legalov	Tertiary		Dominican Republic	A belid weevil. The type species is Pleurambus strongylus.	
Potergosoma	Gen. et sp. nov	Valid	Kovalev, Kirejtshuk & Azar	Early Cretaceous		Lebanon	A throscid beetle, a member of Elateriformia. The type species is Potergosoma gratiosa.	
Pretanaos	Gen. et sp. nov	Valid	Legalov	Late Cretaceous (Turonian)		Kazakhstan	A weevil belonging to the family Brentidae. The type species is Pretanaos ocularis.	
Protocupoides elongatus	Sp. nov	Valid	Ponomarenko in Aristov et al.	Permian (Urzhumian)		Russia	A permocupedid beetle, a species of Protocupoides.	
Protocupoides esini	Sp. nov	Valid	Ponomarenko in Aristov et al.	Permian (Severodvinian)		Russia	A permocupedid beetle, a species of Protocupoides.	
Protodeleaster	Gen. et sp. nov	Valid	Cai et al.	Early Cretaceous	Yixian Formation	China	A rove beetle. The type species is Protodeleaster glaber.	
Protolopheros	Gen. et sp. nov	Valid	Kazantsev	Eocene		Europe	A lycid beetle found in Baltic amber. The type species is Protolopheros hoffeinsorum.	
Protoscelis medvedevi	Sp. nov	Valid	Legalov	Jurassic		Kazakhstan	An anthribid beetle, a species of Protoscelis.	
Protachinus	Gen. et sp. nov	Valid	Cai et al.	Late Jurassic	Talbragar Fish Bed	Australia	A rove beetle. The type species is Protachinus minor.	
Protolissodema	Gen. et sp. nov	Valid	Alekseev	Late Eocene	Prussian Formation	Russia (Kaliningrad Oblast)	A narrow-waisted bark beetle found in Baltic amber. The type species is Protolissodema ulrikae.	
Protonectes	Gen. et sp. nov	Valid	Prokin & Ponomarenko in Prokin et al.	Late Triassic (late Carnian)	Hassberge Formation	Germany	A member of Coptoclavidae. The type species is Protonectes germanicus.	
Pseudochrysomelites bashkuevi	Sp. nov	Valid	Ponomarenko in Aristov et al.	Permian (Severodvinian)		Russia	A schizocoleid beetle, a species of Pseudochrysomelites.	
Pseudochrysomelites longus	Sp. nov	Valid	Ponomarenko in Aristov et al.	Permian (Severodvinian)		Russia	A schizocoleid beetle, a species of Pseudochrysomelites.	
Pseudochrysomelites medialis	Sp. nov	Valid	Ponomarenko in Aristov et al.	Permian (Severodvinian)		Russia	A schizocoleid beetle, a species of Pseudochrysomelites.	
Pseudochrysomelites sphenoidalis	Sp. nov	Valid	Ponomarenko in Aristov et al.	Permian (Severodvinian)		Russia	A schizocoleid beetle, a species of Pseudochrysomelites.	
Psyllototus doeberli	Sp. nov	Valid	Bukejs & Nadein	Late Eocene		Russia (Kaliningrad Oblast)	A flea beetle found in Baltic amber, a species of Psyllototus.	
Ptenidium kishenehnicum	Sp. nov	Valid	Shockley & Greenwalt	Eocene	Kishenehn Formation	United States	A member of the family Ptiliidae.	
Quedius cretaceus	Sp. nov	Disputed	Cai & Huang	Early Cretaceous	Yixian Formation	China	A rove beetle, a species of Quedius. Brunke et al. (2019) considered this species to be a junior synonym of the species Cretoquedius infractus.	
Quedius electrodominicanus	Sp. nov	Valid	Chatzimanolis & Engel	Miocene (Burdigalian)	Dominican amber	Dominican Republic	A rove beetle, a species of Quedius.	
Revelieria groehni	Sp. nov		Sergi, Perkovsky & Reike	Late Eocene	Baltic amber	Russia (Kaliningrad Oblast)	A species of Revelieria.	
Rhomboaspis	Gen. et sp. nov	Valid	Kovalev, Kirejtshuk & Azar	Early Cretaceous		Lebanon	A throscid beetle, a member of Elateriformia. The type species is Rhomboaspis laticollis.	
Rhombocoleites uralensis	Sp. nov	Valid	Ponomarenko in Aristov et al.	Permian (Urzhumian)		Russia	A rhombocoleid beetle, a species of Rossocoleus.	
Rhombocoleus gomankovi	Sp. nov	Valid	Ponomarenko in Aristov et al.	Permian (Severodvinian)		Russia	A rhombocoleid beetle, a species of Rhombocoleus.	
Rossocoleus angustus	Sp. nov	Valid	Ponomarenko in Aristov et al.	Permian (Urzhumian)		Russia	A rhombocoleid beetle, a species of Rossocoleus.	
Rossocoleus aristovi	Sp. nov	Valid	Ponomarenko in Aristov et al.	Permian (Severodvinian)		Russia	A rhombocoleid beetle, a species of Rossocoleus.	
Rossocoleus novojilovi	Sp. nov	Valid	Ponomarenko in Aristov et al.	Permian (Urzhumian)		Russia	A rhombocoleid beetle, a species of Rossocoleus.	
Rossocoleus sakmara	Sp. nov	Valid	Ponomarenko in Aristov et al.	Late Permian (possibly Vyatkian)		Russia	A rhombocoleid beetle, a species of Rossocoleus.	
Sakmaracoleus	Gen. et sp. nov	Valid	Ponomarenko in Aristov et al.	Permian (Vyatkian)		Russia	A permosynid beetle. The type species is Sakmaracoleus orenburgensis.	
Salpingus henricusmontemini	Sp. nov	Valid	Alekseev	Eocene		Russia (Kaliningrad Oblast)	A narrow-waisted bark beetle found in Baltic amber, a species of Salpingus.	
Schizocoleus depressus	Sp. nov	Valid	Ponomarenko in Aristov et al.	Permian (Severodvinian)		Russia	A schizocoleid beetle, a species of Schizocoleus.	
Schizocoleus major	Sp. nov	Valid	Ponomarenko in Aristov et al.	Late Permian (possibly Vyatkian)		Russia	A schizocoleid beetle, a species of Schizocoleus.	
Schizocoleus minimus	Sp. nov	Valid	Ponomarenko in Aristov et al.	Permian (Severodvinian)		Russia	A schizocoleid beetle, a species of Schizocoleus.	
Schizocoleus robustus	Sp. nov	Valid	Ponomarenko in Aristov et al.	Permian (Severodvinian)		Russia	A schizocoleid beetle, a species of Schizocoleus.	
Schizotaldycupes pubescens	Sp. nov	Valid	Ponomarenko in Aristov et al.	Permian (Urzhumian)		Russia	An asiocoleid beetle, a species of Schizotaldycupes.	
Scirtes circumcisus	Sp. nov	Valid	Kirejtshuk & Nel	Early Eocene		France	A scirtid beetle found in Oise amber, a species of Scirtes.	
Simmondsia permiana	Sp. nov	Valid	Ponomarenko in Aristov et al.	Permian (Severodvinian)		Russia	A permocupedid beetle. Originally described as a species of Simmondsia; Kirejtshuk (2020) transferred it to the separate genus Lobanovia.	
Sinanthobium	Gen. et sp. nov	Valid	Cai & Huang	Middle Jurassic	Jiulongshan Formation	China	A rove beetle belonging to the subfamily Omaliinae and the tribe Anthophagini. The type species is S. daohugouense.	
Sinoxytelus transbaicalicus	Sp. nov	Valid	Cai, Yan & Vasilenko	Probably Early Cretaceous		Russia	A rove beetle, a species of Sinoxytelus.	
Stenaspidiotus	Gen. et sp. nov	Valid	Poinar			Dominican Republic	A chrysomeline leaf beetle found in Dominican amber. The type species is Stenaspidiotus microptilus.	
Succinometrioxena bachofeni	Sp. nov	Valid	Legalov	Eocene		Europe	An oxycorynine belid weevil found in Baltic amber, a species of Succinometrioxena.	
Succinorhynchites	Gen. et sp. nov	Valid	Legalov	Eocene		Europe	A rhynchitid weevil found in Baltic amber. The type species is Succinorhynchites alberti.	
Taldycupes cellulosus	Sp. nov	Valid	Ponomarenko in Aristov et al.	Permian (Severodvinian)		Russia	A taldycupedid beetle, a species of Taldycupes.	
Taphioporus	Gen. et sp. nov	Valid	Moseyko & Kirejtshuk	Eocene		Europe (Baltic Sea coast)	A leaf beetle belonging to the subfamily Eumolpinae found in Baltic amber. The type species is Taphioporus balticus.	
Tecticupes martynovi	Sp. nov	Valid	Ponomarenko in Aristov et al.	Permian (Urzhumian)		Russia	A taldycupedid beetle, a species of Tecticupes.	
Tetracoleus meyeni	Sp. nov	Valid	Ponomarenko in Aristov et al.	Permian (Vyatkian)		Russia	An asiocoleid beetle, a species of Tetracoleus.	
Tetracoleus orenburgensis	Sp. nov	Valid	Ponomarenko in Aristov et al.	Permian (Severodvinian)		Russia	An asiocoleid beetle, a species of Tetracoleus.	
Tetracoleus tricoleoides	Sp. nov	Valid	Ponomarenko in Aristov et al.	Permian (Severodvinian)		Russia	An asiocoleid beetle, a species of Tetracoleus.	
Tetratoma (Abstrulia) nikitskyi	Sp. nov	Valid	Alekseev	Eocene		Europe (Baltic Sea coast)	A member of Tetratomidae found in Baltic amber, a species of Tetratoma.	
Thayeralinus	Gen. et 4 sp. et comb. nov	Valid	Solodovnikov & Yue in Solodovnikov et al.	Early Cretaceous	Yixian Formation	China	A rove beetle. The type species is T. fieldi; genus also includes T. longelytratus, T. glandulifer and T. giganteus, as well as "Mesostaphylinus" fraternus Zhang, Wang & Xu (1992).	
Themus pristinus	Sp. nov	Valid	Kazantsev	Eocene	Baltic amber	Europe (Baltic Sea coast)	A soldier beetle.	
Tomoderus longelytratus	Sp. nov	Valid	Telnov	Late Eocene	Baltic amber	Europe (Baltic Sea region)	A species of Tomoderus.	
Triaplus sibiricus	Sp. nov	Valid	Volkov	Exact age uncertain, Permian–Triassic boundary	Mal'tseva Formation	Russia	A triaplid beetle. Originally described as a species of Triaplus, but subsequently argued to be a member of the genus Tunguskagyrus or Tomiaplus.	
Turonerirhinus	Gen. et 3 sp. nov	Valid	Legalov	Late Cretaceous (Turonian)		Kazakhstan	A weevil belonging to the family Curculionidae. The type species is Turonerirhinus karatavensis; genus also contains Turonerirhinus punctatus and Turonerirhinus poinari.	
Turononemonyx	Gen. et sp. nov	Valid	Legalov	Late Cretaceous (Turonian)		Kazakhstan	A weevil belonging to the family Nemonychidae. The type species is Turononemonyx samsonovi.	
Uskatocoleus convexus	Sp. nov	Valid	Ponomarenko in Aristov et al.	Permian (Severodvinian)		Russia	A schizocoleid beetle, a species of Uskatocoleus.	
Uskatocoleus micron	Sp. nov	Valid	Ponomarenko in Aristov et al.	Permian (Severodvinian)		Russia	A schizocoleid beetle, a species of Uskatocoleus.	
Uskatocoleus sukhonenis	Sp. nov	Valid	Ponomarenko in Aristov et al.	Permian (Severodvinian)		Russia	A schizocoleid beetle, a species of Uskatocoleus.	
Uskatocoleus uralensis	Sp. nov	Valid	Ponomarenko in Aristov et al.	Permian (Severodvinian)		Russia	A schizocoleid beetle, a species of Uskatocoleus.	

== Diptera ==
Name	Novelty	Status	Authors	Age	Unit	Location	Notes	Images
Anevrina shoumayae	Sp. nov	Valid	Brown	Eocene	Baltic amber	Europe	A phorid fly.	
Archistempellina	Gen. et 2 sp. nov	Valid	Giłka & Zakrzewska in Giłka et al.	Eocene	Baltic amber Rovno amber	Gdańsk Bay coast Ukraine	A member of Tanytarsini. The type species is A. bifurca; genus also includes A. falcifera.	
Caladomyia szadziewskii	Sp. nov	Valid	Giłka & Zakrzewska in Zakrzewska & Giłka	Eocene	Baltic amber	Europe	A member of Tanytarsini.	
Corneliola	Gen. et sp. nov	Valid	Giłka & Zakrzewska in Giłka et al.	Eocene	Baltic amber Rovno amber	Gdańsk Bay coast Ukraine	A member of Tanytarsini. The type species is C. avia.	
Daohugorhagio	Gen. et sp. nov	Valid	Zhang	Middle Jurassic	Daohugou Beds	China	A rhagionid. The type species is Daohugorhagio elongatus.	
Devalquia	Gen. et sp. nov	Jr synonym	Choufani & Nel in Choufani et al.	Late Cretaceous (Santonian)		France	A biting midge. The type species is D. brisaci. moved to Culicoides brisaciin 2016.	
Dicranomyia alexandri	Nom. nov	Valid	Kania, Penar & Krzemiński	Eocene	Baltic amber	Europe	A limoniid crane fly; a replacement name for "Limonia" flagellata Alexander (1931).	
Dicranomyia gorskii	Sp. nov	Valid	Kania, Penar & Krzemiński	Eocene	Baltic amber	Europe	A limoniid found in Baltic amber, a species of Dicranomyia.	
Ectaetia capdoliensis	Sp. nov	Valid	Fate, Perrichot & Nel	Cretaceous (late Albian-early Cenomanian)		France	A member of Scatopsidae, a species of Ectaetia.	
Elektrothopomyia	Gen. et 2 sp. nov	Valid	Coty & Nel	Late Oligocene to middle Miocene	Mexican amber	Mexico	A pachygastrine stratiomyid fly found in the Mexican amber. Genus contains two species: E. saltensis and E. tzotzili.	
Forcipomyia nadicola	Sp. nov	Valid	Szadziewski in Szadziewski & Sontag	Paleocene	Sakhalin amber	Russia	A species of Forcipomyia.	
Macrochile hornei	Sp. nov	Valid	Krzemiński et al.	Eocene	Baltic amber	Europe	A tanyderid fly	
Metahelea roggeroi	Sp. nov	basionym	Choufani & Nel in Choufani et al.	Late Cretaceous (early Santonian)		France	A biting midge. moved to Stilobezzia roggeroi in 2016.	
Nannotanyderus ansorgei	Sp. nov	Valid	Krzemiński, Azar & Skibińska	Early Cretaceous	Lebanese amber	Lebanon	A tanyderid fly	
Nannotanyderus kubekovensis	Sp. nov	Valid	Skibińska & Krzemiński	Middle Jurassic		Russia	A tanyderid fly	
Parachrysopilus	Gen. et sp. nov	Valid	Zhang	Middle Jurassic	Daohugou Beds	China	A rhagionid. The type species is P. jurassicus.	
Podemacrochile	Gen. et comb. nov	Valid	Krzemiński et al.	Eocene	Baltic amber	Europe	A tanyderid, a new genus for "Macrochile" baltica Podenas (1997).	
Ragas baltica	Sp. nov	Valid	Sinclair & Hoffeins	Eocene	Baltic amber	Europe	An Empididae	
Ragas electrica	Sp. nov	Valid	Sinclair & Hoffeins	Eocene	Baltic amber	Europe	An Empididae	
Ragas eocenica	Sp. nov	Valid	Sinclair & Hoffeins	Eocene	Baltic amber	Europe	An Empididae	
Ragas succinea	Sp. nov	Valid	Sinclair & Hoffeins	Eocene	Baltic amber	Europe	An Empididae	
Ragas ulrichi	Sp. nov	Valid	Sinclair & Hoffeins	Eocene	Baltic amber	Europe	An Empididae	
Rheotanytarsus alliciens	Sp. nov	Valid	Giłka & Zakrzewska in Giłka et al.	Eocene	Rovno amber	Ukraine	A member of Tanytarsini	
Sinorhagio sinuatus	Sp. nov	Valid	Zhang	Middle Jurassic	Daohugou Beds	China	A rhagionid, a species of Sinorhagio.	
Stenotabanus oleariorum	Sp. nov	Valid	Strelow et al.	Miocene	Mexican amber	Mexico	A horse-fly	
Strashila daohugouensis	Sp. nov	Valid	Huang et al.	Middle Jurassic	Daohugou Beds	China	A strashilid fly	
Succinarisemus totolapensis	Sp. nov	Valid	Coty et al.	Probably Oligocene or Miocene	Mexican amber	Mexico	A psychodine psychodid	
Tanytarsus congregabilis	Sp. nov	Valid	Giłka & Zakrzewska in Giłka et al.	Eocene	Rovno amber	Ukraine	A member of Tanytarsini	
Tipula (Platytipula) anatolica	Sp. nov	Valid	Kania & Nel	Aquitanian	Bes-Konak	Turkey	A crane fly	Tipula (Platytipula) anatolica
Tipula (Tipula) oligocenica	Sp. nov	Junior homonym	Kania & Nel	Aquitanian	Bes-Konak	Turkey	A crane fly. The name is preoccupied by Tipula oligocenica Savchenko (1971); a replacement name Tipula jarzembowskii was subsequently introduced.	Tipula (Tipula) oligocenica
Tipula (Trichotipula) paicheleri	Sp. nov	Valid	Kania & Nel	Aquitanian	Bes-Konak	Turkey	A crane fly	Tipula (Trichotipula) paicheleri
Trichorhagio	Gen. et sp. nov	Valid	Zhang	Middle Jurassic	Daohugou Beds	China	A rhagionid. The type species is T. gregarius.	
Trihennigma	Gen. et sp. nov	Valid	Lara & Lukashevich	Late Triassic	Potrerillos Formation	Argentina	A hennigmatid fly. The type species is T. zavattierii.	

== Ephemeroptera ==
Name	Novelty	Status	Authors	Age	Unit	Location	Notes	Images
Alexandrinia ipsa	Sp. nov	Valid	Sinitshenkova	Late Permian (Severodvinian)	Poldarsa Formation	Russia	A protereismatid mayfly, a species of Alexandrinia.	
Alexandrinia vitta	Sp. nov	Valid	Sinitshenkova	Late Permian (Severodvinian)	Poldarsa Formation	Russia	A protereismatid mayfly, a species of Alexandrinia.	
Khungtukunia	Gen. et sp. nov	Valid	Sinitshenkova	Early Triassic		Russia	A vogesonymphid mayfly. The type species is Khungtukunia sibirica.	
Misthodotes dubius	Sp. nov	Valid	Sinitshenkova	Late Permian (Severodvinian)	Poldarsa Formation	Russia	A misthodotid mayfly, a species of Misthodotes.	
Tunephemera	Gen. et sp. nov	Valid	Sinitshenkova	Early Triassic		Russia	A sharephemerid mayfly. The type species is Tunephemera tungussica.	

== Hemiptera ==
Name	Novelty	Status	Authors	Age	Unit	Location	Notes	Images
Aafrita	Gen. et sp. nov	Valid	Szwedo & Azar in Szwedo, Azar & Nohra	Early Cretaceous		Lebanon	A perforissid planthopper. The type species is Aafrita biladalshama.	
Aneurus goitschenus	Sp. nov	Valid	Heiss	Eocene		Germany	A member of Aradidae found in Bitterfeld amber, a species of Aneurus.	
Anthoscytina perpetua	Sp. nov	Valid	Li, Shih & Ren in Li et al.	Middle Jurassic (Bathonian–Callovian boundary)	Jiulongshan Formation	China	A procercopid froghopper, a species of Anthoscytina.	
Aradus grabenhorsti	Sp. nov	Valid	Heiss	Eocene		Germany	A member of Aradidae found in Bitterfeld amber, a species of Aradus.	
Archaesalepta	Gen. et sp. nov	Valid	Grimaldi & Engel in Grimaldi, Engel & Singh	Early Eocene		India	A member of Leptopodomorpha belonging to the family Leptopodidae and the subfamily Leptosaldinae found in Cambay amber. The type species is Archaesalepta schuhi.	
Archemyiomma schaeferi	Sp. nov	Valid	Herczek, Popov & Perkovsky	Late Eocene		Ukraine	An isometopine mirid hemipteran found in Rovno amber, a species of Archemyiomma.	
Aviorrhyncha	Gen. et sp. nov	Valid	Nel et al.	Carboniferous (Moscovian)		France	A euhemipteran hemipteran. The type species is Aviorrhyncha magnifica.	
Bugyrorinaphis bayana	Sp. nov	Valid	Kania & Węgierek	Early Cretaceous		Mongolia	An aphid, a species of Bugyrorinaphis.	
Burmacader	Gen. et sp. nov	Valid	Heiss & Guilbert	Late Cretaceous	Burmese amber	Myanmar	A lace bug. The type species is Burmacader multivenosus.	
Cicadocoris assimilis	sp nov	Valid	Dong, Yao & Ren	Middle Jurassic	Jiulongshan Formation	China	A progonocimicid hemipteran, a species of Cicadocoris.	
Clodionus	Gen. et sp. nov	Valid	Drohojowska & Szwedo	Early Eocene		France	A whitefly found in Oise amber. The type species is Clodionus fizoli.	
Ellinaphis mediata	Sp. nov	Valid	Kania & Węgierek	Early Cretaceous		Mongolia	An aphid, a species of Ellinaphis.	
Ellinaphis stricta	Sp. nov	Valid	Kania & Węgierek	Early Cretaceous		Mongolia	An aphid, a species of Ellinaphis.	
Eogyropsylla paveloctogenarius	Sp. nov	Valid	Ouvrard, Burckhardt & Greenwalt	Eocene (Lutetian)		United States	An aphalarine aphalarid psylloid, a species of Eogyropsylla.	
Gapenus	Gen. et sp. nov	Valid	Drohojowska & Szwedo	Early Cretaceous		Lebanon	An aleurodicine whitefly. The type species is Gapenus rhinariatus.	
Isaraselis	Gen. et sp. nov	Valid	Drohojowska & Szwedo	Early Eocene		France	A whitefly found in Oise amber. The type species is Isaraselis cladiva.	
Kubecora	Gen. et sp. nov	Valid	Ryzhkova	Middle Jurassic	Itat Formation	Russia	An archegocimicid leptopodomorph heteropteran. The type species is Kubecora ignamica.	
Leptosalda dominicana	Sp. nov	Valid	Grimaldi & Engel in Grimaldi, Engel & Singh	Miocene		Dominican Republic	A member of Leptopodomorpha belonging to the family Leptopodidae and the subfamily Leptosaldinae found in Dominican amber; a species of Leptosalda.	
Leptosalda niarchos	Sp. nov	Valid	Grimaldi & Engel in Grimaldi, Engel & Singh	Miocene		Dominican Republic	A member of Leptopodomorpha belonging to the family Leptopodidae and the subfamily Leptosaldinae found in Dominican amber; a species of Leptosalda.	
Longianteclypea	Gen. et comb. nov	Junior synonym	Zhang et al.	Early Cretaceous		Mongolia	A leptopodomorph heteropteran. A new genus for "Enicocoris" tibialis Popov, 1986; however, Ryzhkova (2012) already established a new genus for this species, Mongolocoris, in an earlier publication.	
Luculentsalda	Gen. et sp. nov	Valid	Zhang, Yao & Ren	Early Cretaceous	Yixian Formation	China	A shore bug. The type species is Luculentsalda maculosa.	
Lukotekia	Gen. et sp. nov	Valid	Drohojowska & Szwedo	Early Eocene		France	A whitefly found in Oise amber. The type species is Lukotekia menae.	
Minysporops	Gen. et sp. nov	Valid	Poinar & Heiss			Dominican Republic	A megaridid pentatomoid found in Dominican amber. The type species is Minysporops dominicanus.	
Mongoaphis	Gen. et 2 sp. nov	Valid	Kania & Węgierek	Early Cretaceous		Mongolia	An aphid. Genus contains two species: Mongoaphis maneta and Mongoaphis oblivia.	
Oisedicus	Gen. et sp. nov	Valid	Drohojowska & Szwedo	Early Eocene		France	A whitefly found in Oise amber. The type species is Oisedicus maginus.	
Paleocader gusenleitnerorum	Sp. nov	Valid	Heiss	Eocene		Europe	A member of Tingidae found in Baltic amber, a species of Paleocader.	
Panstrongylus hispaniolae	Sp. nov	Valid	Poinar	Tertiary (estimates range from Eocene to Miocene)		Dominican Republic	A reduviid hemipteran found in Dominican amber, a species of Panstrongylus.	
Parasinalda	Gen. et comb. et sp. nov	Valid	Heiss & Golub	Eocene		Europe	A member of Tingidae found in Baltic amber. A new genus for "Phatnoma" baltica Drake (1950); genus also contains P. froeschneri Golub & Popov (1989), as well as the new species Parasinalda groehni.	
Patollo	Gen. et 2 sp. nov	Valid	Szwedo & Stroiński	Eocene		Europe	A tropiduchid planthopper found in Baltic amber. Genus contains two species: Patollo natangorum and P. aestiorum.	
Poljanka strigosa	sp nov	Valid	Yang, Yao & Ren	Middle Jurassic	Jiulongshan Formation	China	A member of Sternorrhyncha, a protopsyllidiid; a species of Poljanka.	
Primpalaeoaphis	Gen. et sp. nov	Valid	Żyła & Węgierek	Late Jurassic or Early Cretaceous		Mongolia	A palaeoaphidid aphid. The type species is Primpalaeoaphis khotontensis.	
Priscoflata	Gen. et sp. nov	Valid	Szwedo, Stroiński & Lin	Paleocene		China	A flatid planthopper. The type species is Priscoflata subvexa.	
Propritergum	Gen. et sp. nov	Valid	Zhang, Engel, Yao & Ren in Zhang et al.	Early Cretaceous	Yixian Formation	China	A leptopodomorph heteropteran. The type species is Propritergum opimum.	
Rinorectuaphis verita	Sp. nov	Valid	Kania & Węgierek	Early Cretaceous		Mongolia	An aphid, a species of Rinorectuaphis.	
Spinitingis	Gen. et sp. nov	Valid	Heiss & Guilbert	Cenomanian	Burmese amber	Myanmar	A lace bug. The type species is Spinitingis ellenbergeri.	
Synapocossus	Gen. et sp. nov	Valid	Wang, Shih & Ren in Wang et al.	Middle Jurassic	Daohugou Beds	China	A palaeontinid cicadomorph. The type species is Synapocossus sciacchitanoae.	
Talaya	Gen. et sp. nov	Valid	Drohojowska, Szwedo & Azar	Early Cretaceous (early Aptian)	Abeih Formation	Lebanon	A protopsyllidiid psyllomorph, a member of Sternorrhyncha. The type species is Talaya batraba.	
Tetrafulgoria	Nom. nov	Valid	Doweld	Early Jurassic		Germany	A fulgoridiid planthopper; a replacement name for Tetragonidium Bode (1953).	
Tsagaanaphis	Gen. et sp. nov	Valid	Kania & Węgierek	Early Cretaceous		Mongolia	An aphid. The type species is Tsagaanaphis kinga.	

== Hymenoptera ==
Name	Novelty	Status	Authors	Age	Unit	Location	Notes	Images
Anomopterella ampla	Sp. nov	Valid	Li et al.	Middle Jurassic	Daohugou Beds	China	An anomopterellid evanioid, a species of Anomopterella.	
Anomopterella brachystelis	Sp. nov	Valid	Li et al.	Middle Jurassic	Daohugou Beds	China	An anomopterellid evanioid, a species of Anomopterella.	
Anomopterella coalita	Sp. nov	Valid	Li et al.	Middle Jurassic	Daohugou Beds	China	An anomopterellid evanioid, a species of Anomopterella.	
Anomopterella divergens	Sp. nov	Valid	Li et al.	Middle Jurassic	Daohugou Beds	China	An anomopterellid evanioid, a species of Anomopterella.	
Anomopterella ovalis	Sp. nov	Valid	Li et al.	Middle Jurassic	Daohugou Beds	China	An anomopterellid evanioid, a species of Anomopterella.	
Araripescolia	Gen. et sp. nov	Valid	Nel, Escuillie & Garrouste	Early Cretaceous	Crato Formation	Brazil	A scoliid wasp. The type species is Araripescolia magnifica.	
Archoxyelyda	Gen. et sp. nov	Valid	Wang, Rasnitsyn & Ren	Early Cretaceous	Yixian Formation	China	A sawfly belonging to the superfamily Pamphilioidea and the family Praesiricidae. The type species is A. mirabilis.	
Bilobomyrma	Gen. et 2 sp. nov	Valid	Radchenko & Dlussky	Late Eocene		Europe	An ant (possibly a member of Formicoxenini) found in Baltic amber and Rovno amber. Genus contains two species: B. ukrainica and B. baltica.	
Borneomymar pankowskiorum	Sp. nov	Valid	Engel, McKellar & Huber	Eocene (Lutetian)		Europe	A fairyfly found in Baltic amber, a species of Borneomymar.	
Burmaimetsha	Gen. et sp. nov	Valid	Perrichot	Cenomanian	Burmese amber	Myanmar	A maimetshid wasp. The type species is Burmaimetsha concava.	
Ceraphron ceuthonymus	Sp. nov	Valid	Engel	Miocene (Burdigalian)		Dominican Republic	A ceraphronid wasp found in Dominican amber, a species of Ceraphron.	
Choristopterella	Gen. et comb. nov	Valid	Li et al.	Late Jurassic		Kazakhstan	An anomopterellid evanioid; a new genus for "Anomopterella" stenocera Rasnitsyn (1975).	
Chronomyrmex	Gen et sp nov	Valid	McKellar, Glasier & Engel	Campanian	Canadian amber	Canada	A dolichoderine ant, Type speciesChronomyrmex medicinehatensis	Chronomyrmex medicinehatensis
Cretepyris	Gen. et sp. nov	Valid	Ortega-Blanco & Engel	Early Cretaceous (Albian)		Spain	A member of Bethylidae. The type species is Cretepyris martini.	
Cretevania bechlyi	Sp. nov	Valid	Jennings, Krogmann & Mew	Cenomanian	Burmese amber	Myanmar	An evaniid wasp, a species of Cretevania.	
Dominocephala	Gen. et sp. nov	Valid	Krogmann	Oligocene or early Miocene		Dominican Republic	A cerocephaline pteromalid found in Dominican amber. The type species is Dominocephala vibrissae.	
Ectenobythus	Gen. et sp. nov	Valid	Engel, Ortega-Blanco & McKellar	Early Cretaceous (Albian)		Spain	A scolebythid wasp. The type species is Ectenobythus iberiensis.	
Electrobaissa	Gen. et sp. nov	Valid	Engel	Late Cretaceous (Turonian)	New Jersey Amber	United States	A baissid evanioid wasp. The type species is Electrobaissa omega.	
Gurvanhelorus beipiaoensis	Sp. nov	Valid	Shi et al.	Early Cretaceous	Yixian Formation	China	A proctotrupoid. Originally described as a species of Gurvanhelorus; transferred to the genus Spherogaster by Li, Shih & Ren (2017).	
Haidoterminus	Gen at sp. nov	Valid	McKellar, Glasier & Engel	Campanian	Canadian amber	Canada	A Sphecomyrmin ant, only species H. cippus.	Haidoterminus cippus
Hoplitolyda	Gen. et sp. nov	Valid	Gao et al.	Early Cretaceous	Yixian Formation	China	A praesiricid sawfly. The type species is Hoplitolyda duolunica.	
Hyptia hennigi	Sp. nov	Valid	Jennings, Krogmann & Priya	Eocene		Europe	An evaniid wasp found in Baltic amber, a species of Hyptia.	
Iberopria	Gen. et sp. nov	Valid	Engel, Ortega-Blanco & Delclòs in Engel et al.	Early Cretaceous (Albian)		Spain	Originally described as a diapriid hymenopteran; Rasnitsyn & Öhm-Kühnle (2019) considered it to be a member of Proctotrupomorpha of uncertain phylogenetic placement, closely related to Cretacoformica explicata, and possibly related to Serphitoidea and Chalcidoidea. The type species is Iberopria perialla.	
Kronostephanus	Gen. et sp. nov	Valid	Engel & Grimaldi in Engel, Grimaldi & Ortega-Blanco	Cenomanian	Burmese amber	Myanmar	A schlettereriine stephanid wasp. The type species is Kronostephanus zigrasi.	
Laelius preteritus	Sp. nov	Valid	Barbosa & Azevedo in Barbosa, Perkovsky & Azevedo	Late Eocene		Ukraine	A bethylid hymenopteran found in Rovno amber, a species of Laelius.	
Laelius rovnensis	Sp. nov	Valid	Barbosa & Azevedo in Barbosa, Perkovsky & Azevedo	Late Eocene		Ukraine	A bethylid hymenopteran found in Rovno amber, a species of Laelius.	
Lancepyris alavaensis	Sp. nov	Valid	Ortega-Blanco & Engel	Early Cretaceous (Albian)		Spain	A member of Bethylidae. Originally described as a species of Lancepyris; subsequently made the type species of a separate genus Zophepyris by Engel, Ortega-Blanco & Azevedo (2016).	
Liztor	Gen. et sp. nov	Valid	Ortega-Blanco & Engel	Early Cretaceous (Albian)		Spain	A member of Bethylidae. The type species is Liztor pilosus.	
Maimetshasia	Gen. et sp. nov	Valid	Perrichot	Cenomanian	Burmese amber	Myanmar	A maimetshid wasp. The type species is Maimetshasia kachinensis.	
Melikertes (Melikertes) kamboja	Sp. nov	Valid	Engel & Ortega-Blanco in Engel et al.	Early Eocene (Ypresian)	Cambay Formation	India	A bee found in Cambay amber, a species of Melikertes.	
Melikertes (Paramelikertes) gujaratensis	Subgenus et sp. nov	Valid	Engel & Ortega-Blanco in Engel et al.	Early Eocene (Ypresian)	Cambay Formation	India	A bee found in Cambay amber, a species of Melikertes.	
Mymaropsis	Gen. et sp. nov	Valid	Engel & Ortega-Blanco in Engel et al.	Early Cretaceous (Albian)		Spain	A hymenopteran related to diapriids and maamingids. The type species is Mymaropsis turolensis.	
Necrobythus	Gen. et sp. nov	Valid	Engel, Ortega-Blanco & McKellar	Late Cretaceous (Campanian)		Canada	A scolebythid wasp. The type species is Necrobythus pulcher.	
Palaeogronotoma	Gen. et sp. nov	Valid	Peñalver, Fontal-Cazalla & Pujade-Villar	Miocene (Burdigalian)	Rubielos de Mora Basin	Spain	A member of the family Figitidae. The type species is P. nordlanderi.	
Parviformosus	Gen. et sp. nov	Valid	Barling, Heads & Martill	Early Cretaceous (Aptian)	Crato Formation	Brazil	Originally classified as a member of the family Pteromalidae; Haas et al. (2020) considered it to be a member of Proctotrupomorpha of uncertain phylogenetic placement. The type species is Parviformosus wohlrabeae.	
Platystasius gracilis	Gen. et sp. nov	Valid	Kononova & Simutnik	Late Eocene		Ukraine	A sceliotracheline platygastrid wasp found in Rovno amber, a species of Platystasius.	
Ponomarenkoa ellenbergeri	Sp. nov	Valid	Olmi, Xu & He	Late Cretaceous (Cenomanian)	Burmese amber	Myanmar	A member of the family Dryinidae or Embolemidae.	
Praeproapocritus flexus	Sp. nov	Valid	Li, Shih & Ren	Middle Jurassic	Jiulongshan Formation	China	An ephialtitid wasp, a species of Praeproapocritus.	
Proapocritus parallelus	Sp. nov	Valid	Li, Shih & Ren	Middle Jurassic	Jiulongshan Formation	China	An ephialtitid wasp, a species of Proapocritus.	
Sinohelorus	Gen. et sp. nov	Valid	Shi et al.	Early Cretaceous	Yixian Formation	China	A helorid proctotrupoid. The type species is Sinohelorus elegans.	
Spathiopteryx	Gen. et sp. nov	Valid	Engel & Ortega-Blanco in Engel et al.	Early Cretaceous (Albian)		Spain	A hymenopteran related to diapriids and maamingids. The type species is Spathiopteryx alavarommopsis.	
Spathopria	Gen. et sp. nov	Valid	Engel, Ortega-Blanco & Grimaldi in Engel et al.	Late Cretaceous (Turonian)	New Jersey Amber	United States	A hymenopteran related to diapriids and maamingids. The type species is Spathopria sayrevillensis.	
Sphakelobythus	Gen. et sp. nov	Valid	Engel, Ortega-Blanco & McKellar	Late Cretaceous (Campanian)		Canada	A scolebythid wasp. The type species is Sphakelobythus limnopous.	
Spherogaster saltatrix	Sp. nov	Valid	Shi et al.	Early Cretaceous	Yixian Formation	China	A proctotrupoid. Originally described as a species of Spherogaster; transferred to the genus Novhelorus by Li, Shih & Ren (2017).	
Stephanogaster ningchengensis	Sp. nov	Valid	Ding et al.	Middle Jurassic	Daohugou Beds	China	An ephialtitid wasp, a species of Stephanogaster.	
Synaphopterella	Gen. et sp. nov	Valid	Li et al.	Middle Jurassic	Daohugou Beds	China	An anomopterellid evanioid. The type species is Synaphopterella patula.	
Yantaromyrmex	Gen. et comb. et 2 sp. nov	Valid	Dlussky & Dubovikoff	Late Eocene		Europe	A dolichoderine ant. A new genus for "Hypoclinea" geinitzi Mayr (1868); genus also contains "Hypoclinea" constricta Mayr (1868) and "Iridomyrmex" samlandicus Wheeler (1915), as well as new species Yantaromyrmex intermedius and Yantaromyrmex mayrianum.	
Zigrasimecia	Gen. et sp. nov	Valid	Barden & Grimaldi	Cenomanian	Burmese amber	Myanmar	A Sphecomyrmine ant. Type species Z. tonsora	Zigrasimecia tonsora
Zoropelecinus	Gen. et sp. nov	Valid	Engel & Grimaldi in Engel, Grimaldi & Ortega-Blanco	Cenomanian	Burmese amber	Myanmar	A pelecinid wasp. The type species is Zoropelecinus zigrasi.	

== Lepidoptera ==
Name	Novelty	Status	Authors	Age	Unit	Location	Notes	Images
Akainalepidopteron	Gen. et sp. nov	Valid	Zhang, Shih, Labandeira & Ren in Zhang et al.	Middle Jurassic (Callovian–Oxfordian boundary)	Jiulongshan Formation	China	An eolepidopterigid lepidopteran. The type species is Akainalepidopteron elachipteron.	
Ascololepidopterix	Gen. et sp. nov	Valid	Zhang, Shih, Labandeira & Ren in Zhang et al.	Middle Jurassic (Callovian–Oxfordian boundary)	Jiulongshan Formation	China	An ascololepidopterigid lepidopteran. The type species is Ascololepidopterix multinerve.	
Bohemannia aschaueri	Sp. nov	Valid	Fischer	Eocene		Russia (Kaliningrad Oblast)	A pygmy moth found in Baltic amber, a species of Bohemannia.	
Bohemannia butzmanni	Sp. nov	Valid	Fischer	Eocene		Russia (Kaliningrad Oblast)	A pygmy moth found in Baltic amber, a species of Bohemannia.	
Dynamilepidopteron	Gen. et sp. nov	Valid	Zhang, Shih, Labandeira & Ren in Zhang et al.	Middle Jurassic (Callovian–Oxfordian boundary)	Jiulongshan Formation	China	An eolepidopterigid lepidopteran. The type species is Dynamilepidopteron aspinosus.	
Grammikolepidopteron	Gen. et sp. nov	Valid	Zhang, Shih, Labandeira & Ren in Zhang et al.	Middle Jurassic (Callovian–Oxfordian boundary)	Jiulongshan Formation	China	An eolepidopterigid lepidopteran. The type species is Grammikolepidopteron extensus.	
Kladolepidopteron	Gen. et 3 sp. nov	Valid	Zhang, Shih, Labandeira & Ren in Zhang et al.	Middle Jurassic (Callovian–Oxfordian boundary)	Jiulongshan Formation	China	A mesokristenseniid lepidopteran. The type species is Kladolepidopteron oviformis; genus also contains Kladolepidopteron subaequalis and Kladolepidopteron parva.	
Longcapitalis	Gen. et sp. nov	Valid	Zhang, Shih, Labandeira & Ren in Zhang et al.	Middle Jurassic (Callovian–Oxfordian boundary)	Jiulongshan Formation	China	An eolepidopterigid lepidopteran. The type species is Longcapitalis excelsus.	
Mesokristensenia trichophora	Sp. nov	Valid	Zhang, Shih, Labandeira & Ren in Zhang et al.	Middle Jurassic (Callovian–Oxfordian boundary)	Jiulongshan Formation	China	A mesokristenseniid lepidopteran, a species of Mesokristensenia.	
Pegolepidopteron	Gen. et sp. nov	Valid	Zhang, Shih, Labandeira & Ren in Zhang et al.	Middle Jurassic (Callovian–Oxfordian boundary)	Jiulongshan Formation	China	An ascololepidopterigid lepidopteran. The type species is Pegolepidopteron latiala.	
Petilicorpus	Gen. et sp. nov	Valid	Zhang, Shih, Labandeira & Ren in Zhang et al.	Middle Jurassic (Callovian–Oxfordian boundary)	Jiulongshan Formation	China	An eolepidopterigid lepidopteran. The type species is Petilicorpus cristatus.	
Quadruplecivena	Gen. et sp. nov	Valid	Zhang, Shih, Labandeira & Ren in Zhang et al.	Middle Jurassic (Callovian–Oxfordian boundary)	Jiulongshan Formation	China	An eolepidopterigid lepidopteran. The type species is Quadruplecivena celsa.	
Seresilepidopteron	Gen. et sp. nov	Valid	Zhang, Shih, Labandeira & Ren in Zhang et al.	Middle Jurassic (Callovian–Oxfordian boundary)	Jiulongshan Formation	China	An eolepidopterigid lepidopteran. The type species is Seresilepidopteron dualis.	
Trionolepidopteron	Gen. et sp. nov	Valid	Zhang, Shih, Labandeira & Ren in Zhang et al.	Middle Jurassic (Callovian–Oxfordian boundary)	Jiulongshan Formation	China	An ascololepidopterigid lepidopteran. The type species is Trionolepidopteron admarginis.	

== Mecoptera ==
Name	Novelty	Status	Authors	Age	Unit	Location	Notes	Images
Ageropanorpa danili	Sp. nov	Valid	Bashkuev in Aristov et al.	Permian (Severodvinian)		Russia	A permochoristid mecopteran, a species of Ageropanorpa.	
Bellicimbrophlebia	Gen. et 4 sp. nov	Valid	Yang, Shih & Ren	Middle Jurassic	Jiulongshan Formation	China	A relative of Cimbrophlebia and hangingflies. Genus contains 4 species: B. angusta, B. cruciata, B. disvena and B. eumorpha.	
Burmomerope	Gen. et sp. nov	Valid	Grimaldi & Engel	Cenomanian	Burmese amber	Myanmar	A meropeid mecopteran. The type species is Burmomerope eureka.	
Eorpa	Fam, Gen. et sp. nov	Valid	Archibald, Mathewes & Greenwood	Eocene		Canada; United States	three species: E. ypsipeda, E. elverumi & E. jurgeni.	
Fortiholcorpa	Gen. et sp. nov	Valid	Wang, Shih & Ren	Middle Jurassic (the Bathonian–Callovian boundary)	Jiulongshan Formation	China	A mecopteran of uncertain phylogenetic placement. The type species is Fortiholcorpa paradoxa.	
Mesochorista generalis	Sp. nov	Valid	Bashkuev in Aristov et al.	Permian (Severodvinian)		Russia	A permochoristid mecopteran, a species of Mesochorista.	
Miriholcorpa	Gen. et sp. nov	Valid	Wang, Shih & Ren	Middle Jurassic (the Bathonian–Callovian boundary)	Jiulongshan Formation	China	A mecopteran of uncertain phylogenetic placement. The type species is Miriholcorpa forcipata.	
Mirorcimbrophlebia	Gen. et sp. nov	Valid	Yang, Shih & Ren	Middle Jurassic	Jiulongshan Formation	China	A relative of Cimbrophlebia and hangingflies. The type species is Mirorcimbrophlebia daohugouensis.	
Neudolbenus	Gen. et 2 sp. nov	Valid	Bashkuev in Aristov et al.	Permian (Severodvinian)		Russia	A permochoristid mecopteran. The type species is Neudolbenus kopylovi; genus also contains Neudolbenus giganteus.	
Permeca media	Sp. nov	Valid	Bashkuev in Aristov et al.	Permian (Severodvinian)		Russia	A permochoristid mecopteran, a species of Permeca.	
Permeca pygmaea	Sp. nov	Valid	Bashkuev in Aristov et al.	Permian (Severodvinian)		Russia	A permochoristid mecopteran, a species of Permeca.	
Tatarakara variomaculata	Sp. nov	Valid	Bashkuev in Aristov et al.	Permian (Severodvinian)		Russia	A permochoristid mecopteran, a species of Tatarakara.	
Telobittacus bellus	Sp. nov	Valid	Yang, Shih & Ren	Middle Jurassic	Jiulongshan Formation	China	A relative of Cimbrophlebia and hangingflies, a species of Telobittacus.	

== Miomoptera ==
Name	Novelty	Status	Authors	Age	Unit	Location	Notes	Images
Balymotikha	Gen. et sp. nov	Valid	Rasnitsyn & Aristov in Aristov et al.	Permian (Vyatkian)		Russia	A member of Palaeomanteida. The type species is Balymotikha deterior.	
Epimastax mutovinensis	Sp. nov	Valid	Rasnitsyn & Aristov in Aristov et al.	Permian (Severodvinian)		Russia	A member of Palaeomanteida, a species of Epimastax.	
Epimastax tshepanikha	Sp. nov	Valid	Rasnitsyn & Aristov in Aristov et al.	Permian (Urzhumian)		Russia	A member of Palaeomanteida, a species of Epimastax.	
Issapaloptera	Gen. et sp. nov	Valid	Rasnitsyn & Aristov in Aristov et al.	Permian (Severodvinian)		Russia	A member of Palaeomanteida. The type species is Issapaloptera infracta.	
?Miomatoneurella rossoshana	Sp. nov	Valid	Rasnitsyn & Aristov in Aristov et al.	Permian (Urzhumian)		Russia	A member of Palaeomanteida, possibly a species of Miomatoneurella.	
Neembia	Gen. et sp. nov	Valid	Rasnitsyn & Aristov in Aristov et al.	Permian (Severodvinian)		Russia	A member of Palaeomanteida. The type species is Neembia ampla.	
Onthomastax	Gen. et sp. nov	Valid	Rasnitsyn & Aristov in Aristov et al.	Permian (Urzhumian)		Russia	A member of Palaeomanteida. The type species is Onthomastax coprinus.	
Permosialis udmurtensis	Sp. nov	Valid	Rasnitsyn & Aristov in Aristov et al.	Permian (Urzhumian)		Russia	A member of Palaeomanteida, a species of Permosialis.	
Permosialis zavialovensis	Sp. nov	Valid	Rasnitsyn & Aristov in Aristov et al.	Permian (Urzhumian)		Russia	A member of Palaeomanteida, a species of Permosialis.	
?Tridelopterum indebitum	Sp. nov	Valid	Rasnitsyn & Aristov in Aristov et al.	Permian (Severodvinian)		Russia	A member of Palaeomanteida, possibly a species of Tridelopterum.	

== Neuroptera ==
Name	Novelty	Status	Authors	Age	Unit	Location	Notes	Images
Adamsochrysa	Gen. et 2 sp. nov	Valid	Makarkin & Archibald	Early Eocene		Canada; United States	A chrysopid. Genus contains two species: Adamsochrysa aspera and A. wilsoni.	
Archaeochrysa profracta	Sp. nov	Valid	Makarkin & Archibald	Early Eocene		Canada	A chrysopid, a species of Archaeochrysa.	
Archaeodrepanicus	Gen. et 2 sp. nov	Valid	Jepson et al.	Early Cretaceous (Barremian)	Yixian Formation	China	A mantispid. Genus contains two species: Archaeodrepanicus nuddsi and Archaeodrepanicus acutus.	
Choristopsyche asticta	Sp nov	Valid	Qiao et al	Bathonian-Callovian	Jiulongshan Formation	China; Inner Mongolia	A choristopsychid mecopteran	
Choristopsyche perfecta	Sp nov	Valid	Qiao et al	Bathonian-Callovian	Jiulongshan Formation	China; Inner Mongolia	A choristopsychid mecopteran	
Clavifemora	Gen. et sp. nov	Valid	Jepson et al.	Middle Jurassic (Bathonian)	Jiulongshan Formation	China	A mantispid. The type species is Clavifemora rotundata.	
Dipteromantispa	Gen. et sp. nov	Valid	Makarkin, Yang & Ren	Early Cretaceous	Yixian Formation	China	A member of Neuroptera. The type species is Dipteromantispa brevisubcosta.	
Epipanfilovia	Gen. et sp. nov	Valid	Yang, Makarkin & Ren	Middle Jurassic	Daohugou Beds	China	A panfiloviid neuropteran, possibly a relative of osmylids. The type species is Epipanfilovia oviformis.	
Huiyingosmylus	Gen. et sp. nov	Valid	Liu et al.	Middle Jurassic	Daohugou Beds	China	A saucrosmyline neuropteran. The type species is Huiyingosmylus bellus.	
Neoconis paleocaribis	Sp. nov	Valid	Grimaldi & Engel in Grimaldi et al.	Miocene		Dominican Republic	A coniopterygid found in Dominican amber, a species of Neoconis.	
Mesithone carnaria	Sp. nov	Valid	Khramov	Late Jurassic		Kazakhstan	A mantispid neuropteran. Originally described as a species of Mesithone; subsequently transferred by Jepson (2015) to the separate genus Karataumantispa.	
Mesithone monstruosa	Sp. nov	Valid	Khramov	Late Jurassic		Kazakhstan	A mantispid neuropteran. Originally described as a species of Mesithone; subsequently transferred by Jepson (2015) to the separate genus Karataumantispa and by Jepson, Khramov & Ohl (2018) to the genus Ovalofemora.	
Okanaganochrysa	Gen. et sp. nov	Valid	Makarkin & Archibald	Early Eocene		Canada	A chrysopid. The type species is Okanaganochrysa coltsunae.	
Paristopsyche	Gen et sp nov	Valid	Qiao et al	Bathonian-Callovian	Jiulongshan Formation	China; Inner Mongolia	A choristopsychid mecopteran Type species P. angelineae	Paristopsyche angelineae
Protochrysa fuscobasalis	Sp. nov	Valid	Makarkin & Archibald	Early Eocene		Canada	A chrysopid, a species of Protochrysa.	
Pseudochrysopa	Gen. et sp. nov	Valid	Makarkin & Archibald	Early Eocene		Canada	A chrysopid. The type species is Pseudochrysopa harveyi.	
Sibelliberotha	Gen. et sp. nov	Valid	Azar & Nel	Early Cretaceous		Lebanon	A berothid neuropteran. The type species is Sibelliberotha rihanensis.	
Sinomesomantispa	Gen. et sp. nov	Valid	Jepson et al.	Early Cretaceous (Barremian)	Yixian Formation	China	A mantispid. The type species is Sinomesomantispa microdentata.	
Spiloconis eominuta	Sp. nov	Valid	Grimaldi & Engel in Grimaldi et al.	Eocene		India	A coniopterygid found in Cambay amber, a species of Spiloconis.	

== Notoptera ==
Name	Novelty	Status	Authors	Age	Unit	Location	Notes	Images
Abbrevikhosara	Gen. et sp. nov	Valid	Aristov in Aristov et al.	Permian (Severodvinian)		Russia	A megakhosarid, a relative of grylloblattids. The type species is Abbrevikhosara ovoidea.	
Baharellinus dilaceratus	Sp. nov	Valid	Aristov	Late Permian		Russia	A blattogryllid, a member of Grylloblattida/Eoblattida; a species of Baharellinus.	
Baharellinus porrectus	Sp. nov	Valid	Aristov in Aristov et al.	Permian (Severodvinian)		Russia	A blattogryllid, a relative of grylloblattids; a species of Baharellinus.	
Issadische	Gen. et sp. nov	Valid	Aristov	Late Permian		Russia	A member of Eoblattida/Grylloblattida of uncertain phylogenetic placement, possibly belonging to the family Bardapteridae. The type species is Issadische maximum.	
Issadonympha	Gen. et sp. nov	Valid	Aristov in Aristov et al.	Permian (Severodvinian)		Russia	A member of Grylloblattida of uncertain phylogenetic placement, a relative of grylloblattids. The type species is Issadonympha oculea.	
Kenguronympha	Gen. et sp. nov	Valid	Aristov in Aristov et al.	Permian (Severodvinian)		Russia	A member of Grylloblattida of uncertain phylogenetic placement, a relative of grylloblattids. The type species is Kenguronympha lenta.	
Kuplya	Gen. et sp. nov	Valid	Aristov	Late Permian		Russia	A tshekardominid, a member of Grylloblattida. The type species is Kuplya minutissima.	
Megakhosarodes borealis	Sp. nov	Valid	Aristov	Late Permian		Russia	A megakhosarid, a member of Grylloblattida/Eoblattida; a species of Megakhosarodes.	
Megakhosarodes tensilis	Sp. nov	Valid	Aristov	Late Permian		Russia	A megakhosarid, a member of Grylloblattida/Eoblattida; a species of Megakhosarodes.	
Mesoidelia gorochovi	Sp. nov	Valid	Aristov in Aristov et al.	Permian (Severodvinian)		Russia	A mesorthopterid, a relative of grylloblattids; a species of Mesoidelia.	
Parakhosara reticulata	Sp. nov	Valid	Aristov in Aristov et al.	Permian (Severodvinian)		Russia	A megakhosarid, a relative of grylloblattids; a species of Parakhosara.	
Permofossilis	Gen. et sp. nov	Valid	Aristov	Late Permian		Russia	A permotermopsid, a member of Grylloblattida/Eoblattida. The type species is Permofossilis commasticatus.	
Sharovites	Gen. et sp. nov	Valid	Aristov & Storozhenko	Middle Triassic	Madygen Formation	Kyrgyzstan	A member of Grylloblattida/Eoblattida belonging to the family Mesorthopteridae. The type species is S. alexanderi.	
Sigmophlebia rugulosa	Sp. nov	Valid	Aristov	Late Permian		Kazakhstan	A tshekardominid, a member of Grylloblattida; a species of Sigmophlebia.	

== Odonatoptera ==
Name	Novelty	Status	Authors	Age	Unit	Location	Notes	Images
Angustiphlebia	Gen. et sp. nov	Valid	Li et al.	Middle Jurassic	Jiulongshan Formation	China	A member of Odonata, a campterophlebiid. The type species is Angustiphlebia mirabilis.	
Aseripterella	Gen. et sp. nov	Valid	Li et al.	Carboniferous (early Pennsylvanian)		China	A member of Odonatoptera. The type species is Aseripterella sinensis.	
Burmaphlebia	Gen. et sp. nov	Valid	Bechly & Poinar	Early Cretaceous	Burmese amber	Myanmar	A burmaphlebiid odonate found in Cretaceous Burmese amber, probably closely related to Epiophlebia. The type species is Burmaphlebia reifi.	
Elektroeuphaea	Gen. et sp. nov	Valid	Nel, Krzemiński & Szwedo	Eocene		Europe (Baltic Sea coast)	A gossamerwing found in Baltic amber. The type species is Elektroeuphaea flecki.	
Eumorbaeschna adriankini	Sp. nov	Valid	Bechly & Kin	Late Tithonian		Poland	A eumorbaeschnid dragonfly, a species of Eumorbaeschna.	
Frenguellia iglesiasi	Sp. nov	Valid	Petrulevičius & Nel	Early Eocene		Argentina	A frenguelliid, a member of Odonata; a species of Frenguellia.	
Hsiufua	Gen. et sp. nov	Valid	Zhang & Wang in Zhang et al.	Middle Jurassic	Haifanggou Formation	China	A campterophlebiid, a member of Odonata. The type species is Hsiufua chaoi.	
Italophlebia baueri	Sp. nov	Valid	Barth, Nel & Franz	Late Triassic (latest Norian)		Germany	A triassolestid, a member of Odonata; a species of Italophlebia.	
Salagoulestes	Gen. et sp. nov	Valid	Fate, Lapeyrie & Nel	Middle Permian	Salagou Formation	France	A permagrionid protozygopteran odonatopteran. The type species is Salagoulestes wesleyi.	
Sinoeuthemis	Gen. et sp. nov	Valid	Li et al.	Middle Jurassic (Bathonian-Callovian boundary)	Jiulongshan Formation	China	A euthemistid odonate. The type species is Sinoeuthemis daohugouensis.	
Sylphalula	Gen. et sp. nov	Valid	Li et al.	Carboniferous (early Pennsylvanian)		China	A member of Odonatoptera. The type species is Sylphalula laliquei.	
Triassothemis gartzii	Sp. nov	Valid	Barth, Nel & Franz	Late Triassic (Norian-Rhaetian boundary)		Germany	A triassolestid, a member of Odonata; a species of Triassothemis.	

== Orthoptera ==
Name	Novelty	Status	Authors	Age	Unit	Location	Notes	Images
Archifergania	Gen. et sp. nov	Valid	Gorochov in Aristov et al.	Permian (Severodvinian)		Russia	A proparagryllacridid oedischioid ensiferan. The type species is Archifergania isadyensis.	
Ashanga borealis	Sp. nov	Valid	Fang et al.	Early Cretaceous	Yixian Formation	China	A chifengiine prophalangopsid orthopteran, a species of Ashanga.	
Meselcana udmurtica	Sp. nov	Valid	Gorochov in Aristov et al.	Permian (Urzhumian)		Russia	A permelcanid elcanoid ensiferan, a species of Meselcana.	
Meselcana vologodica	Sp. nov	Valid	Gorochov in Aristov et al.	Permian (Severodvinian)		Russia	A permelcanid elcanoid ensiferan, a species of Meselcana.	
Suchonoedischia	Gen. et sp. nov	Valid	Gorochov in Aristov et al.	Permian (Severodvinian)		Russia	A pruvostitid oedischioid ensiferan. The type species is Suchonoedischia incompleta.	

== Plecoptera ==
Name	Novelty	Status	Authors	Age	Unit	Location	Notes	Images
Boreoperlidium	Gen. et sp. nov	Valid	Sinitshenkova in Aristov et al.	Permian (Severodvinian)		Russia	A eustheniid gripopterygomorph plecopteran. The type species is Boreoperlidium borealis.	
Issadoperla	Gen. et sp. nov	Valid	Sinitshenkova in Aristov et al.	Permian (Severodvinian)		Russia	A tshekardoperlid perlomorph plecopteran. The type species is Issadoperla permiana.	
Kargaloperla decipiens	Sp. nov	Valid	Sinitshenkova in Aristov et al.	Permian (Severodvinian)		Russia	A palaeoperlid perlomorph plecopteran, a species of Kargaloperla.	
Kargaloperla furcata	Sp. nov	Valid	Sinitshenkova in Aristov et al.	Permian (Severodvinian)		Russia	A palaeoperlid perlomorph plecopteran, a species of Kargaloperla.	
Mirumoperla	Gen. et sp. nov	Valid	Sinitshenkova in Aristov et al.	Permian (Severodvinian)		Russia	A perlomorph plecopteran. The type species is Mirumoperla multinerva.	
Palaeonemoura amica	Sp. nov	Valid	Sinitshenkova in Aristov et al.	Permian (Severodvinian)		Russia	A palaeonemourid plecopteran, a species of Palaeonemoura.	
Palaeonemoura antrorsa	Sp. nov	Valid	Sinitshenkova in Aristov et al.	Permian (Severodvinian)		Russia	A palaeonemourid plecopteran, a species of Palaeonemoura.	
Palaeonemoura repleta	Sp. nov	Valid	Sinitshenkova in Aristov et al.	Permian (Urzhumian)		Russia	A palaeonemourid plecopteran, a species of Palaeonemoura.	
Palaeonemourisca diluta	Sp. nov	Valid	Sinitshenkova in Aristov et al.	Permian (Severodvinian)		Russia	A palaeonemourid plecopteran, a species of Palaeonemourisca.	
Palaeonemourisca formalis	Sp. nov	Valid	Sinitshenkova in Aristov et al.	Permian (Severodvinian)		Russia	A palaeonemourid plecopteran, a species of Palaeonemourisca.	
Palaeonemourisca strigosa	Sp. nov	Valid	Sinitshenkova in Aristov et al.	Permian (Urzhumian)		Russia	A palaeonemourid plecopteran, a species of Palaeonemourisca.	
Palaeotaeniopteryx adjecta	Sp. nov	Valid	Sinitshenkova in Aristov et al.	Permian (Severodvinian)		Russia	A palaeonemourid plecopteran, a species of Palaeotaeniopteryx.	
Palaeotaeniopteryx amissa	Sp. nov	Valid	Sinitshenkova in Aristov et al.	Permian (Severodvinian)		Russia	A palaeonemourid plecopteran, a species of Palaeotaeniopteryx.	
Palaeotaeniopteryx constricta	Sp. nov	Valid	Sinitshenkova in Aristov et al.	Permian (Severodvinian)		Russia	A palaeonemourid plecopteran, a species of Palaeotaeniopteryx.	
Palaeotaeniopteryx dejecta	Sp. nov	Valid	Sinitshenkova in Aristov et al.	Permian (Severodvinian)		Russia	A palaeonemourid plecopteran, a species of Palaeotaeniopteryx.	
Palaeotaeniopteryx fixa	Sp. nov	Valid	Sinitshenkova in Aristov et al.	Permian (Severodvinian)		Russia	A palaeonemourid plecopteran, a species of Palaeotaeniopteryx.	
Palaeotaeniopteryx mira	Sp. nov	Valid	Sinitshenkova in Aristov et al.	Permian (Severodvinian)		Russia	A palaeonemourid plecopteran, a species of Palaeotaeniopteryx.	
Palaeotaeniopteryx succida	Sp. nov	Valid	Sinitshenkova in Aristov et al.	Permian (Severodvinian)		Russia	A palaeonemourid plecopteran, a species of Palaeotaeniopteryx.	
Properla issadensis	Sp. nov	Valid	Sinitshenkova in Aristov et al.	Permian (Severodvinian)		Russia	A palaeoperlid perlomorph plecopteran, a species of Properla.	
Votaknemoura	Gen. et sp. nov	Valid	Sinitshenkova in Aristov et al.	Permian (Severodvinian)		Russia	A palaeonemourid plecopteran. The type species is Votaknemoura admiranda.	

== Trichoptera ==
Name	Novelty	Status	Authors	Age	Unit	Location	Notes	Images
Agraylea cumsacculo	Sp. nov	Valid	Wichard	Eocene	Baltic amber	Europe (Baltic Sea coast	A member of the family Hydroptilidae.	
Agraylea glaesaria	Sp. nov	Valid	Wichard	Eocene	Baltic amber	Europe (Baltic Sea coast	A member of the family Hydroptilidae.	
Allotrichia clara	Sp. nov	Valid	Wichard	Eocene	Baltic amber	Europe (Baltic Sea coast	A member of the family Hydroptilidae.	
Allotrichia superba	Sp. nov	Valid	Wichard	Eocene	Baltic amber	Europe (Baltic Sea coast	A member of the family Hydroptilidae.	
Archaeotinodes petropolitana	Sp. nov	Valid	Melnitsky & Ivanov	Late Eocene (40 million years old)		Europe	An ecnomid caddisfly found in Baltic amber, a species of Archaeotinodes.	
Archaeotinodes regiomontana	Sp. nov	Valid	Melnitsky & Ivanov	Late Eocene (40 million years old)		Europe	An ecnomid caddisfly found in Baltic amber, a species of Archaeotinodes.	
Archaeotinodes rossica	Sp. nov	Valid	Melnitsky & Ivanov	Late Eocene (40 million years old)		Europe	An ecnomid caddisfly found in Baltic amber, a species of Archaeotinodes.	
Aulacomyia wunderlichi	Sp. nov	Valid	Wichard	Eocene	Baltic amber	Europe (Baltic Sea coast	A member of the family Sericostomatidae.	
Baissoferus sinitsae	Sp. nov	Valid	Sukatsheva & Vassilenko	Late Jurassic–Early Cretaceous		Russia	A baissoferid caddisfly. Originally described as a species of Baissoferus, but subsequently transferred to the genus Pardoferus.	
Cladochorista issadica	Sp. nov	Valid	Sukatsheva & Aristov in Aristov et al.	Permian (Severodvinian)		Russia	A cladochoristid caddisfly, a species of Cladochorista.	
Cladochoristella ryzhkovae	Sp. nov	Valid	Sukatsheva & Aristov in Aristov et al.	Permian (Vyatkian)		Russia	A cladochoristid caddisfly, a species of Cladochoristella.	
Declinimodus	Gen. et sp. nov	Valid	Gao, Yao & Ren	Middle Jurassic	Jiulongshan Formation	China	A rhyacophilid caddisfly. The type species is Declinimodus setulosus.	
Dysoneura zherikhini	Sp. nov	Valid	Sukatsheva & Vassilenko	Late Jurassic–Early Cretaceous		Russia	A dysoneurid caddisfly, a species of Dysoneura.	
Electragapetus elegans	Sp. nov	Valid	Wichard	Eocene	Baltic amber	Europe (Baltic Sea coast	A member of the family Glossosomatidae.	
Electragapetus intectus	Sp. nov	Valid	Wichard	Eocene	Baltic amber	Europe (Baltic Sea coast	A member of the family Glossosomatidae.	
Electragapetus novus	Sp. nov	Valid	Wichard	Eocene	Baltic amber	Europe (Baltic Sea coast	A member of the family Glossosomatidae.	
Electroadicella	Gen. et 3 sp. et comb. nov	Valid	Wichard	Eocene	Baltic amber	Baltic Sea coast Germany	A member of the family Leptoceridae. Genus includes new species E. bitterfeldi, E. eocaenica and E. succina, as well as "Erotesis" evidens Mey (1988) and "Erotesis" concinnula Mey (1986).	
Electroapatania	Gen. et sp. nov	Valid	Wichard	Eocene	Baltic amber	Europe (Baltic Sea coast	A member of the family Apataniidae. Genus includes new species E. fossilis.	
Electrocryptochia	Gen. et sp. nov	Valid	Wichard	Eocene	Baltic amber	Europe (Baltic Sea coast	A member of the family Limnephilidae. Genus includes new species E. wigginsi.	
Electroganonema	Gen. et sp. nov	Valid	Wichard	Eocene	Baltic amber	Europe (Baltic Sea coast	A member of the family Calamoceratidae. Genus includes new species E. magna.	
Electrotriaenodes	Gen. et sp. nov	Valid	Wichard	Eocene	Baltic amber	Europe (Baltic Sea coast	A member of the family Leptoceridae. Genus includes new species E. hexapterus.	
Helicopsyche cona	Sp. nov	Valid	Wichard	Eocene	Baltic amber	Europe (Baltic Sea coast	A species of Helicopsyche.	
Helicopsyche damseni	Sp. nov	Valid	Wichard	Eocene	Baltic amber	Europe (Baltic Sea coast	A species of Helicopsyche.	
Helicopsyche scapi	Sp. nov	Valid	Wichard	Eocene	Baltic amber	Europe (Baltic Sea coast	A species of Helicopsyche.	
Holocentropus dugoi	Sp. nov	Valid	Ivanov & Melnitsky	Eocene		Europe	A caddisfly found in Baltic amber, a species of Holocentropus.	
Holocentropus fundamentalis	Sp. nov	Valid	Ivanov & Melnitsky	Eocene		Europe	A caddisfly found in Baltic amber, a species of Holocentropus.	
Holocentropus peregrinator	Sp. nov	Valid	Ivanov & Melnitsky	Eocene		Europe	A caddisfly found in Baltic amber, a species of Holocentropus.	
Holocentropus proximorepertus	Sp. nov	Valid	Ivanov & Melnitsky	Eocene		Europe	A caddisfly found in Baltic amber, a species of Holocentropus.	
Holocentropus telergon	Sp. nov	Valid	Ivanov & Melnitsky	Eocene		Europe	A caddisfly found in Baltic amber, a species of Holocentropus.	
Isochorema secunda	Sp. nov	Valid	Wichard	Eocene	Baltic amber	Europe (Baltic Sea coast	A member of the family Hydrobiosidae.	
Kamopanorpa maculata	Sp. nov	Valid	Sukatsheva & Aristov in Aristov et al.	Permian (Urzhumian)		Russia	A microptysmatid caddisfly, a species of Kamopanorpa.	
Kamopanorpa tshepanikhensis	Sp. nov	Valid	Sukatsheva & Aristov in Aristov et al.	Permian (Urzhumian)		Russia	A microptysmatid caddisfly, a species of Kamopanorpa.	
Maniconeurodes ruedigerwagneri	Sp. nov	Valid	Wichard	Eocene	Baltic amber	Europe (Baltic Sea coast	A member of the family Lepidostomatidae.	
Marilia succinea	Sp. nov	Valid	Wichard	Eocene	Baltic amber	Europe (Baltic Sea coast	A member of the family Odontoceridae.	
Meyochorema	Gen. et sp. nov	Valid	Wichard	Eocene	Baltic amber	Europe (Baltic Sea coast	A member of the family Hydrobiosidae. Genus includes new species M. prima.	
Molanna megategulae	Sp. nov	Valid	Wichard	Eocene	Baltic amber	Europe (Baltic Sea coast	A member of the family Molannidae.	
Molanna okraina	Sp. nov	Valid	Ivanov & Melnitsky	Eocene		Europe	A caddisfly found in Baltic amber, a species of Molanna.	
Nyctiophylax valideturbidus	Sp. nov	Valid	Ivanov & Melnitsky	Eocene		Europe	A caddisfly found in Baltic amber, a species of Nyctiophylax.	
Ogmomyia conspicua	Sp. nov	Valid	Wichard	Eocene	Baltic amber	Europe (Baltic Sea coast	A member of the new family Ogmomyidae.	
Ogmomyia ulmeri	Sp. nov	Valid	Wichard	Eocene	Baltic amber	Europe (Baltic Sea coast	A member of the new family Ogmomyidae.	
Plectrocnemia novokshonovi	Sp. nov	Valid	Ivanov & Melnitsky	Eocene		Europe	A caddisfly found in Baltic amber, a species of Plectrocnemia.	
Plectrocnemia synthesia	Sp. nov	Valid	Ivanov & Melnitsky	Eocene		Europe	A caddisfly found in Baltic amber, a species of Plectrocnemia.	
Plectrocnemia varigoria	Sp. nov	Valid	Ivanov & Melnitsky	Eocene		Europe	A caddisfly found in Baltic amber, a species of Plectrocnemia.	
Prochita	Gen. et sp. nov	Valid	Sukatsheva & Vassilenko	Late Jurassic–Early Cretaceous		Russia	A dysoneurid caddisfly. The type species is Prochita rasnitsyni.	
Prorhyacophila rasnitsyni	Sp. nov	Valid	Sukatsheva & Aristov in Aristov et al.	Permian (Vyatkian)		Russia	A prorhyacophilid caddisfly, a species of Prorhyacophila.	
Pulchercylindratus	Gen. et sp. nov	Valid	Gao, Yao & Ren	Middle Jurassic	Jiulongshan Formation	China	A hydrobiosid caddisfly. The type species is Pulchercylindratus punctatus.	
Rhyacophila electroscissa	Sp. nov	Valid	Wichard	Eocene	Baltic amber	Europe (Baltic Sea coast	A species of Rhyacophila.	
Rhyacophila palaeobaltica	Sp. nov	Valid	Wichard	Eocene	Baltic amber	Europe (Baltic Sea coast	A species of Rhyacophila.	
Rhyacophila palaeofurcata	Sp. nov	Valid	Wichard	Eocene	Baltic amber	Europe (Baltic Sea coast	A species of Rhyacophila.	
Rhyacophila succinea	Sp. nov	Valid	Wichard	Eocene	Baltic amber	Europe (Baltic Sea coast	A species of Rhyacophila.	
Stenoptilomyia incopula	Sp. nov	Valid	Wichard	Eocene	Baltic amber	Europe (Baltic Sea coast	A member of the family Sericostomatidae.	
Triplectides vondembuschi	Sp. nov	Valid	Wichard	Eocene	Baltic amber	Europe (Baltic Sea coast	A member of the family Leptoceridae.	

== Other ==
Name	Novelty	Status	Authors	Age	Unit	Location	Notes	Images
Afrogrylloblattus	Gen. et sp. nov	Valid	Aristov & Mostovski	Late Permian		South Africa	A skaliciid, a member of Polyneoptera/Gryllones belonging to the group Reculida. The type species is Afrogrylloblattus disputabilis.	
Aviobreyeria	Gen. et sp. nov	Valid	Prokop et al.	Late Carboniferous		France	A breyeriid palaeodictyopteran. The type species is Aviobreyeria gracilis.	
Avioxyela	Gen. et sp. nov	Valid	Nel et al.	Carboniferous (Moscovian)		France	A relative of hymenopterans. The type species is Avioxyela gallica.	
Carbonokata	Gen. et sp. nov	Valid	Aristov	Late Carboniferous		Russia	A member of Cnemidolestidae (a group of insects of uncertain phylogenetic placement, might be related to plecopterans or orthopterans). The type species is Carbonokata storozhenkoi.	
Chauliodites circumornatus	Sp. nov	Valid	Aristov in Aristov et al.	Permian (Severodvinian)		Russia	A chaulioditid; a species of Chauliodites.	
Chauliodites geniatus	Sp. nov	Valid	Aristov in Aristov et al.	Permian (Severodvinian)		Russia	A chaulioditid; a species of Chauliodites.	
Chauliodites kitshmengensis	Sp. nov	Valid	Aristov	Early Triassic		Russia	A chaulioditid, a member of Polyneoptera/Gryllones belonging to the group Reculida; a species of Chauliodites.	
Chauliodites nedubrovensis	Sp. nov	Valid	Aristov	Early Triassic		Russia	A chaulioditid, a member of Polyneoptera/Gryllones belonging to the group Reculida; a species of Chauliodites.	
Chauliodites niedzwiedzkii	Sp. nov	Valid	Aristov, Żyła & Węgierek	Triassic (late Olenekian or early Anisian)		Poland	A chaulioditid; a species of Alexandrinia.	
Chrysoraphidia	Gen. et sp. nov	Valid	Liu et al.	Early Cretaceous (Barremian)	Yixian Formation	China	A snakefly. The type species is Chrysoraphidia relicta.	
Cretalepisma	Gen. et sp. Nov	Valid	Mendes & Wunderlich	Cenomanian	Burmese amber	Myanmar	A lepismatid silverfish.	
Dvinopedes	Gen. et sp. nov	Valid	Aristov	Late Permian		Russia	A chaulioditid, a member of Polyneoptera/Gryllones belonging to the group Reculida. The type species is Dvinopedes salariovensis.	
Eocenoxenos	Gen. et sp. nov	Valid	Henderickx & Bosselaers in Henderickx et al.	Eocene		Europe	A corioxenid strepsipteran found in Baltic amber. The type species is Eocenoxenos palintropos.	
Eoglosselytrum biarmicum	Sp. nov	Valid	Rasnitsyn & Aristov in Aristov et al.	Permian (Urzhumian)		Russia	A member of Jurinida (=Glosselytrodea), a species of Eoglosselytrum.	
?Eoglosselytrum kultshumovense	Sp. nov	Valid	Rasnitsyn & Aristov in Aristov et al.	Permian (Severodvinian)		Russia	A member of Jurinida (=Glosselytrodea), possibly a species of Eoglosselytrum.	
Evenkiophlebia	Gen. et sp. nov	Valid	Aristov	Late Carboniferous		Russia	A member of Cnemidolestidae. The type species is Evenkiophlebia collucata.	
Falseshurabia	Gen. et sp. nov	Valid	Aristov in Aristov et al.	Permian (Severodvinian)		Russia	A member of Polyneoptera/Gryllones belonging to the group Reculida and the family Liomopteridae. The type species is Falseshurabia transitoria.	
Geinitzia subita	Sp. nov	Valid	Aristov in Aristov et al.	Permian (Severodvinian)		Russia	A geinitziid, a member of Polyneoptera/Gryllones belonging to the group Reculida; a species of Geinitzia.	
Glaphyrophlebia anderhalterorum	Sp. nov	Valid	Beckemeyer	Permian (Artinskian)	Wellington Formation	United States	A neopteran belonging to the family Blattinopsidae.	
Hadropsylla	Gen. et sp. nov	Valid	Huang et al.	Middle Jurassic	Jiulongshan Formation	China	A pseudopulicid flea. The type species is Hadropsylla sinica.	
Haplodiplatys crightoni	Sp. nov	Valid	Ross & Engel	Miocene		Mexico	A diplatyid earwig, a species of Haplodiplatys.	
Hymega	Gen. et sp. nov	Valid	Shcherbakov	Late Permian (~258 million years ago)		Russia	A relative of megalopterans. The type species is Hymega rasnitsyni.	
Idelopsocus mutovinus	Sp. nov	Valid	Rasnitsyn & Aristov in Aristov et al.	Permian (Severodvinian)		Russia	A member of Hypoperlida, a species of Idelopsocus.	
Isadelytron	Gen. et 2 sp. nov	Valid	Rasnitsyn & Aristov in Aristov et al.	Permian (Severodvinian, possibly also Urzhumian)		Russia	A member of Jurinida (=Glosselytrodea). Genus contains the type species Isadelytron speciosum and possibly also ?Isadelytron planum.	
Isadistica	Gen. et 2 sp. nov	Valid	Rasnitsyn & Aristov in Aristov et al.	Permian (Severodvinian)		Russia	A member of Caloneurida. Genus contains two species: Isadistica issada and Isadistica longa.	
Isadyphasma	Gen. et 3 sp. nov	Valid	Gorochov in Aristov et al.	Permian (Severodvinian)		Russia	A prochresmodoid phasmatopteran, possibly a member of Permophasmatidae. The type species is Isadyphasma bashkuevi; genus also contains Isadyphasma suchonae and Isadyphasma deminutum.	
Issadohymen	Gen. et sp. nov	Valid	Sinitshenkova & Aristov in Aristov et al.	Permian (Severodvinian)		Russia	A member of Mischopterida (=Megasecoptera). The type species is Issadohymen ponomarenkoi.	
Izykhia	Gen. et sp. nov	Valid	Aristov	Late Carboniferous		Russia	A member of Cnemidolestida/Cnemidolestodea belonging to the family Spanioderidae. The type species is Izykhia tridentis.	
?Jarmilacladus patiens	Sp. nov	Valid	Rasnitsyn & Aristov in Aristov et al.	Permian (Urzhumian)		Russia	A member of Hypoperlida, possibly a species of Jarmilacladus.	
?Karajurina desperata	Sp. nov	Valid	Rasnitsyn & Aristov in Aristov et al.	Permian (Severodvinian)		Russia	A member of Jurinida (=Glosselytrodea), possibly a species of Karajurina.	
Klyazmia	Gen. et sp. nov	Valid	Aristov	Late Permian		Russia	A chaulioditid, a member of Polyneoptera/Gryllones belonging to the group Reculida. The type species is Klyazmia karasevi.	
Liomofrater	Gen. et sp. nov	Valid	Aristov in Aristov et al.	Permian (Severodvinian)		Russia	A member of Polyneoptera/Gryllones belonging to the group Reculida and the family Liomopteridae. The type species is Liomofrater circumcisus.	
Liomopterites meridionalis	Sp. nov	Valid	Aristov & Mostovski	Late Permian		South Africa	A liomopterid; a species of Liomopterites.	
Liomopterites ulterior	Sp. nov	Valid	Aristov & Mostovski	Late Permian		South Africa	A liomopterid; a species of Liomopterites.	
Lydasialis	Gen. et sp. nov	Valid	Shcherbakov	Late Permian (~258 million years ago)		Russia	A relative of megalopterans. The type species is Lydasialis micheneri.	
Metabolarva	Gen. et sp. nov	Valid	Nel et al.	Carboniferous (Moscovian)		Germany	A member of Holometabola of uncertain phylogenetic placement. The type species is Metabolarva bella.	Metabolarva bella
Monstrotitan	Gen. et sp. nov	Valid	Gorochov in Aristov et al.	Permian (Severodvinian)		Russia	A deinotitanid, possibly a member of Titanoptera. The type species is Monstrotitan monstrosus.	
Nanosialis	Gen. et 2 sp. nov	Valid	Shcherbakov	Late Permian (~258 million years ago)		Russia	A relative of megalopterans. Genus contains two species: Nanosialis ponomarenkoi and Nanosialis bashkuevi.	
Narkemina kata	Sp. nov	Valid	Aristov	Late Carboniferous		Russia	A member of Cnemidolestidae, a species of Narkemina.	
Narkeminopsis inversa	Sp. nov	Valid	Aristov	Late Carboniferous		Russia	A member of Cnemidolestidae, a species of Narkeminopsis.	
Narkeminuta	Gen. et sp. nov	Valid	Aristov	Early Permian		Russia	A member of Cnemidolestidae. The type species is Narkeminuta permiana.	
Narkemulla	Gen. et sp. nov	Valid	Aristov	Late Carboniferous		Russia	A member of Cnemidolestidae. The type species is Narkemulla sibirica.	
Normandienoptera	Gen. et sp. nov	Valid	Aristov & Mostovski	Late Permian		South Africa	A skaliciid, a member of Polyneoptera/Gryllones belonging to the group Reculida. The type species is Normandienoptera serotina.	
Opisthocladus kargalensis	Sp. nov	Valid	Rasnitsyn & Aristov in Aristov et al.	Middle Permian	Amanak Formation	Russia	Originally described as a member of Hypoperlida and a species of Opisthocladus. Rasnitsyn & Aristov (2021) subsequently transferred it to the genus Tococladus in the eoblattid family Tococladidae.	
Parachauliodites	Gen. et sp. nov	Valid	Aristov	Late Permian		Russia	A chaulioditid, a member of Polyneoptera/Gryllones belonging to the group Reculida. The type species is Parachauliodites orthopteroides.	
Permyak	Gen. et sp. nov	Valid	Aristov in Aristov et al.	Permian (Severodvinian)		Russia	A chaulioditid. The type species is Permyak involucris.	
Pseudopulex wangi	Sp. nov	Valid	Huang et al.	Middle Jurassic	Jiulongshan Formation	China	A pseudopulicid flea, a species of Pseudopulex.	
Purtovinia	Gen. et sp. nov	Valid	Aristov in Aristov et al.	Permian (Severodvinian)		Russia	A chaulioditid. The type species is Purtovinia ustyugensis.	
Raphisialis	Gen. et sp. nov	Valid	Shcherbakov	Late Permian (~258 million years ago)		Russia	A relative of megalopterans. The type species is Raphisialis martynovi.	
Saurophthirus exquisitus	Sp. nov	Valid	Geo et al.	Early Cretaceous	Yixian Formation	China	A flea, a species of Saurophthirus.	
Shurabia permiana	Sp. nov	Valid	Aristov in Aristov et al.	Permian (Severodvinian)		Russia	A geinitziid, a member of Polyneoptera/Gryllones belonging to the group Reculida; a species of Shurabia.	
Silesiapteron	Gen. et sp. nov	Valid	Prokop et al.	Late Carboniferous		Poland	A member of Paoliidae, a possible relative of dictyopterans. The type species is Silesiapteron jarmilae.	
Sinodunbaria	Gen. et sp. nov	Valid	Li et al.	Late Carboniferous (Namurian)	Tupo Formation	China	A member of Palaeodictyoptera. The type species is Sinodunbaria jarmilae.	
Stenodictya (?) lusitanica	Sp. nov	Valid	Correia et al.	Late Carboniferous (early Gzhelian)		Portugal	A member of Palaeodictyoptera, possibly a species of Stenodictya.	
Stephanastus	Gen. et sp. nov	Valid	Nel et al.	Carboniferous (Gzhelian)		France	An insect of uncertain phylogenetic placement. Nel et al. (2013) interpreted it as a relative of beetles; Beutel, Yan & Kukalová-Peck (2018) considered it more likely to be a member of Protelytroptera. The type species is Stephanastus polinae.	Stephanastus polinae
Strephoptilus	Gen. et 2 sp. nov	Valid	Rasnitsyn & Aristov in Aristov et al.	Permian (Severodvinian)		Russia	A member of Hypoperlida. Genus contains two species: Strephoptilus borealis and Strephoptilus longus.	
Sukhonia	Gen. et sp. nov	Valid	Aristov in Aristov et al.	Permian (Severodvinian)		Russia	A geinitziid, a member of Polyneoptera/Gryllones belonging to the group Reculida. The type species is Sukhonia coriacea.	
Sylvaella semicolorata	Sp. nov	Valid	Aristov in Aristov et al.	Permian (Severodvinian)		Russia	A member of Polyneoptera/Gryllones belonging to the group Reculida and the family Liomopteridae; a species of Sylvaella.	
Tshunoptera	Gen. et sp. nov	Valid	Aristov	Late Carboniferous		Russia	A member of Cnemidolestidae. The type species is T. ampla.	
Tyrannopsylla	Gen. et sp. nov	Valid	Huang et al.	Early Cretaceous	Yixian Formation	China	A pseudopulicid flea. The type species is Tyrannopsylla beipiaoensis.	
Uzelothrips eocenicus	Species	Valid	Nel & Nel in Nel et al.	Lowermost Eocene		France	An uzelothripid thrip, a species of Uzelothrips.	
Westphalopsocus	Gen. et sp. nov	Valid	Nel et al.	Carboniferous (Moscovian)		France	A member of Psocodea. The type species is Westphalopsocus pumilio.	
