= Cephalothrips =

Scientific classification
- Kingdom: Animalia
- Phylum: Arthropoda
- Class: Insecta
- Order: Thysanoptera
- Family: Phlaeothripidae
- Subfamily: Phlaeothripinae
- Genus: Cephalothrips; Uzel, 1895

Species
- Several, including: Cephalothrips hesperus Hood, 1941; Cephalothrips monilicornis (Reuter, 1880)

Genus of thrips

Cephalothrips is a genus of thrips in the subfamily Phlaeothripinae.

== Species ==
- Cephalothrips albostriatus
- Cephalothrips brachychaitus
- Cephalothrips coxalis
- Cephalothrips fuscus
- Cephalothrips hesperus
- Cephalothrips longicapitus
- Cephalothrips merrilli
- Cephalothrips monilicornis
