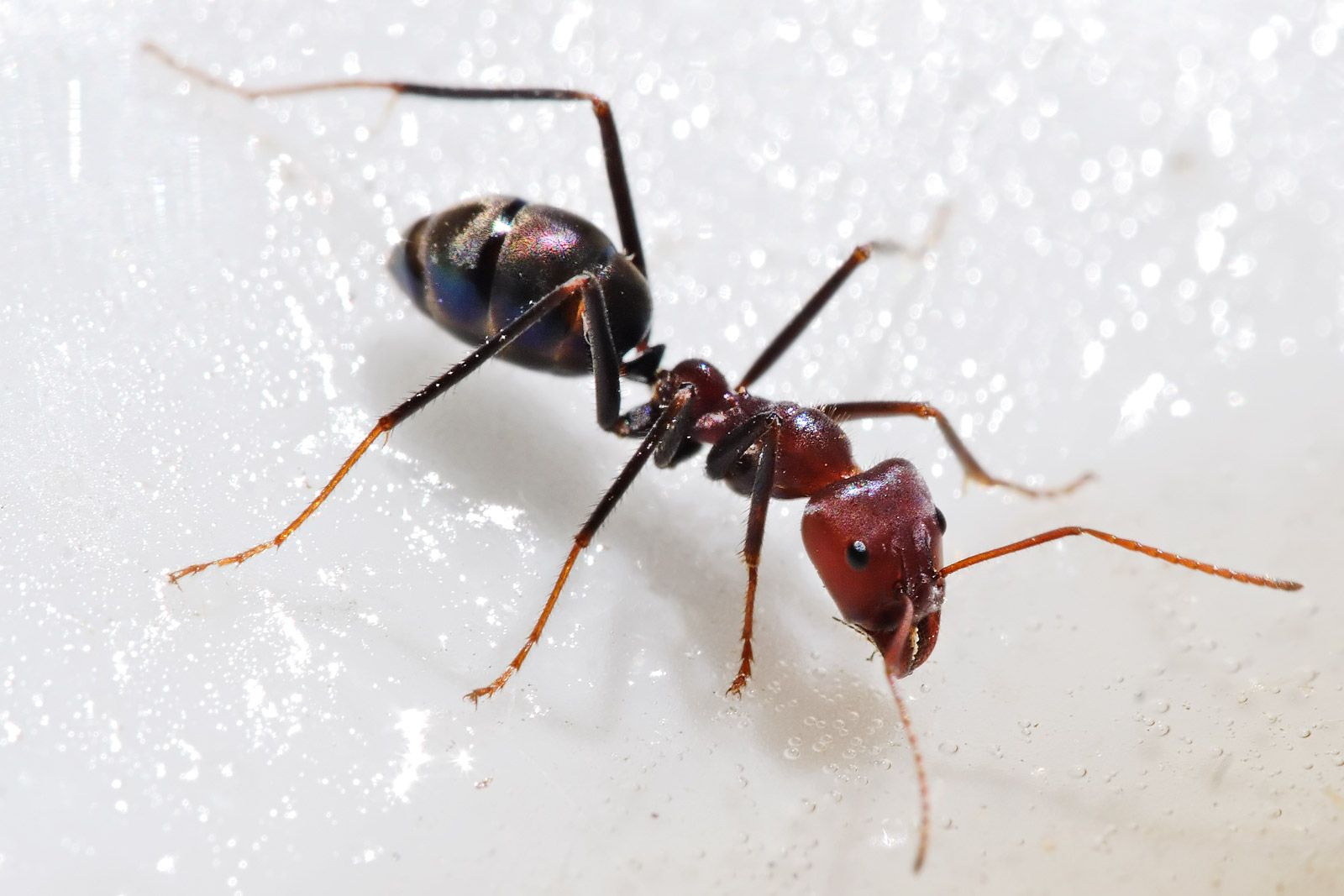
- Meat ant (I. purpureus)

Scientific classification
- Domain: Eukaryota
- Kingdom: Animalia
- Phylum: Arthropoda
- Class: Insecta
- Order: Hymenoptera
- Family: Formicidae
- Subfamily: Dolichoderinae
- Tribe: Leptomyrmecini; Emery, 1913

Genera
- See text

Diversity
- 16 genera 1 extinct genus

= Leptomyrmecini =

Tribe of ants

Leptomyrmecini is a tribe of Dolichoderinae ants with 16 genera and two extinct genera.

== Genera ==
- Anillidris Santschi, 1936
- Anonychomyrma Donisthorpe, 1947
- Azteca Forel, 1878
- †Chronomyrmex McKellar, Glasier & Engel, 2013
- Doleromyrma Forel, 1907
- Dorymyrmex Mayr, 1866
- Forelius Emery, 1888
- Froggattella Forel, 1902
- Gracilidris Wild & Cuezzo, 2006
- Iridomyrmex Mayr, 1862
- Leptomyrmex Mayr, 1862
- Linepithema Mayr, 1866
- Nebothriomyrmex Dubovikov, 2004
- Ochetellus Shattuck, 1992
- Papyrius Shattuck, 1992
- Philidris Shattuck, 1992
- Turneria Forel, 1895
