= Liadroporus =

Liadroporus Temporal range: Barremian–Aptian

Scientific classification
- Domain: Eukaryota
- Kingdom: Animalia
- Phylum: Arthropoda
- Class: Insecta
- Order: Coleoptera
- Suborder: Adephaga
- Family: Dytiscidae
- Subfamily: †Liadytiscinae
- Tribe: †Liadytiscini
- Genus: †Liadroporus; Prokin & Ren, 2010
- Species: †L. elegans

Binomial name
- †Liadroporus elegans Prokin & Ren, 2010

Genus of beetles

Liadroporus is an extinct genus of predaceous diving beetles in the family Dytiscidae. There is one described species in Liadroporus, L. elegans.
