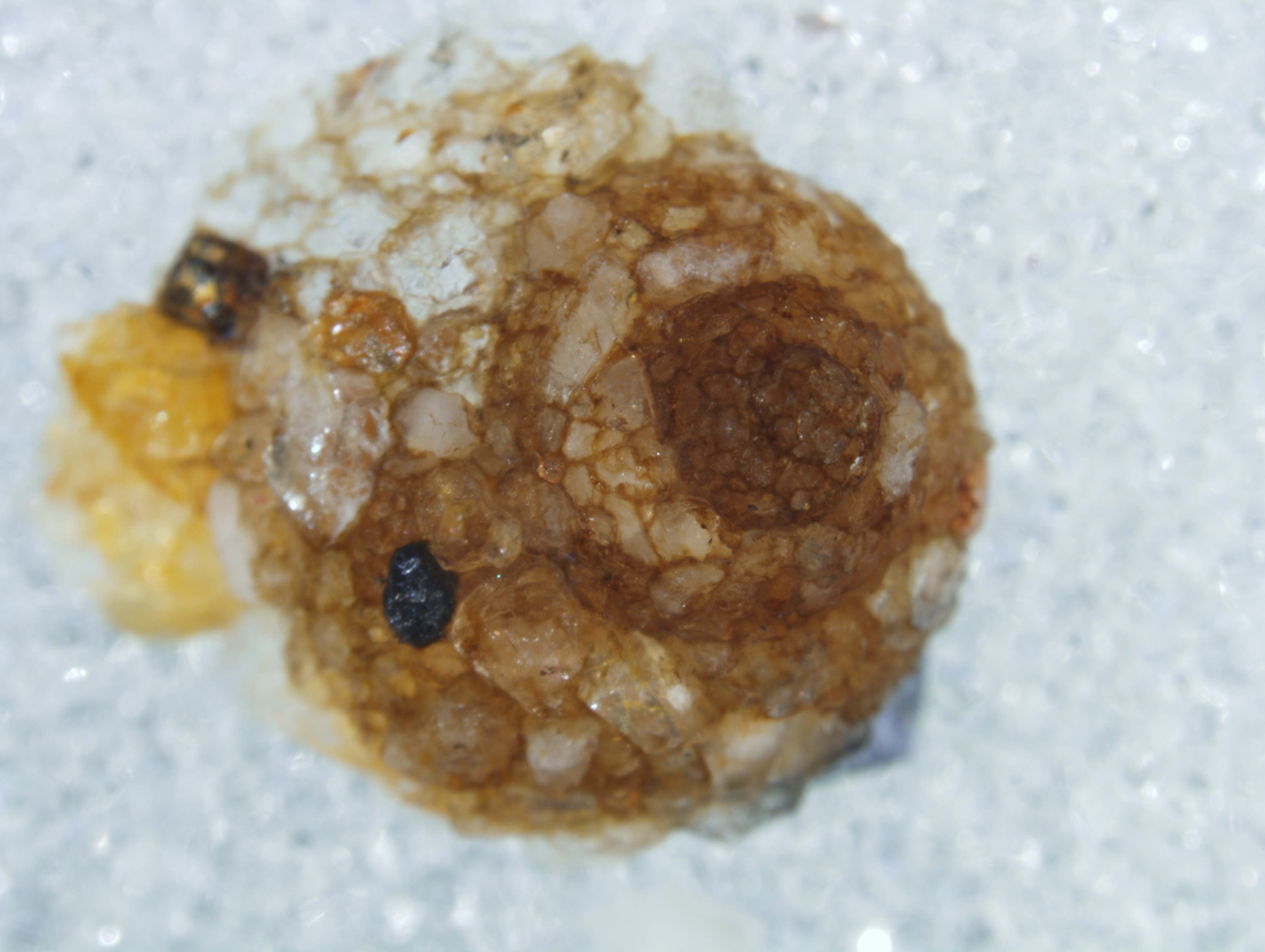
- Helicopsyche sp.

Scientific classification
- Domain: Eukaryota
- Kingdom: Animalia
- Phylum: Arthropoda
- Class: Insecta
- Order: Trichoptera
- Superfamily: Sericostomatoidea
- Family: Helicopsychidae; Ulmer, 1912

Genera
- Helicopsyche; Rakiura

= Snail-case caddisfly =

Family of caddisflies

Helicopsychidae (snail-case caddisflies) are a family of Trichoptera. The name refers to the helix shaped larval cases and they should not be confused with Limnephilidae which sometimes inhabit the snail shells. Their shells range from 6–8 millimetres (0.24–0.31 in) and are crafted from mineral grains. Their typical habitat is in slow-flowing water in ditches. Helicopsychidae larvae have a comb-like anal hook. Helicopsychidae is divided into two extant genera, Rakiura and Helicopsyche, and two fossil genera Electrohelicopsyche and Palaeohelicopsyche. The family contains more than 270 species and are present on all major faunal regions.
