= Liadytiscinae =

Liadytiscinae Temporal range: Aptian

Scientific classification
- Domain: Eukaryota
- Kingdom: Animalia
- Phylum: Arthropoda
- Class: Insecta
- Order: Coleoptera
- Suborder: Adephaga
- Family: Dytiscidae
- Subfamily: †Liadytiscinae; Prokin & Ren, 2010

Tribes
- Liadytiscini; Mesoderini

Subfamily of beetles

Liadytiscinae is a subfamily of extinct predaceous diving beetles in the family Dytiscidae. There are about 5 genera and 10 described species in Liadytiscinae. All currently known members of the subfamily are known from the Early Cretaceous Jehol Biota of China.

== Genera ==
These five genera belong to the subfamily Liadytiscinae:

- † Liadroporus Prokin & Ren, 2010 Yixian Formation, China, Early Cretaceous (Aptian)
- † Liadytiscus Prokin & Ren, 2010 Yixian Formation, China, Early Cretaceous (Aptian)
- † Mesoderus Prokin & Ren, 2010 Yixian Formation, China, Early Cretaceous (Aptian)
- † Liadyxianus Prokin, Petrov, B. Wang & Ponomarenko, 2013 Yixian Formation, China, Early Cretaceous (Aptian)
- † Mesodytes Prokin, Petrov, Wang & Ponomarenko, 2013 Yixian Formation, China, Early Cretaceous (Aptian)
