= Liadytiscus =

Liadytiscus Temporal range: Barremian–Aptian

Scientific classification
- Domain: Eukaryota
- Kingdom: Animalia
- Phylum: Arthropoda
- Class: Insecta
- Order: Coleoptera
- Suborder: Adephaga
- Family: Dytiscidae
- Subfamily: †Liadytiscinae
- Tribe: †Liadytiscini
- Genus: †Liadytiscus; Prokin & Ren, 2010

Genus of beetles

Liadytiscus is an extinct genus of predaceous diving beetles in the family Dytiscidae. There are at least three described species in Liadytiscus.

== Species ==
These three species belong to the genus Liadytiscus:

- † Liadytiscus cretaceus Prokin & Ren, 2010
- † Liadytiscus latus Prokin & Ren, 2010
- † Liadytiscus longitibialis Prokin & Ren, 2010
