= Rakiura vernale =

Scientific classification
- Kingdom: Animalia
- Phylum: Arthropoda
- Clade: Pancrustacea
- Class: Insecta
- Order: Trichoptera
- Family: Helicopsychidae
- Genus: Rakiura; McFarlane, 1973
- Species: R. vernale

Binomial name
- Rakiura vernale McFarlane, 1973

Genus of caddisflies

Rakiura is a genus of Trichoptera (caddisfly). The genus contains only one species, Rakiura vernale, which is endemic to New Zealand. Rakiura vernale represents the most basal taxon within the Helicopsychidae.

== Identification ==
Larvae have a case that is dextrally coiled, with the coils incompletely fused. The head, in dorsal view, is rounded with marginal carina and covered by loosely distribute setae. The posterior part of frontoclypeal is slender. In lateral view, the head is dorsally straight with eyes erected dorsad. Larvae have a strongly sclerotized pronotum with anterior-pointing megasetae. The mesonotum and metanotum are weakly sclerotized. No abdominal gills are present. An anal claw is present with a single row of comb-shaped accessory hooks.

Adults have 2-jointed maxillary palps, a basal joint with strong median setae, and a distal joint about 2,5 times longer than basal joint. Antennae are about as long as the fore wing. Adults have large, oval cephalic warts with an irregular median margin. Small postantennal warts are also present. Pronotum has a pair of oblong central warts. Mesonotum has setal warts divided into row of setal bases; setal warts are absent on metanotum. No postcutellar line present. Dimorphic fore wings with modifications are present only on males.
