= Mesoderus =

Mesoderus Temporal range: Barremian–Aptian

Scientific classification
- Domain: Eukaryota
- Kingdom: Animalia
- Phylum: Arthropoda
- Class: Insecta
- Order: Coleoptera
- Suborder: Adephaga
- Family: Dytiscidae
- Subfamily: †Liadytiscinae
- Tribe: †Mesoderini
- Genus: †Mesoderus; Prokin & Ren, 2010

Genus of beetles

Mesoderus is an extinct genus of predaceous diving beetles in the family Dytiscidae. There are at least four described species in Mesoderus.

== Species ==
These four species belong to the genus Mesoderus:

- † Mesoderus magnus Prokin & Ren, 2010
- † Mesoderus ovatus Prokin, Petrov, B. Wang & Ponomarenko, 2013
- † Mesoderus punctatus Prokin, Petrov, B. Wang & Ponomarenko, 2013
- † Mesoderus ventralis Prokin & Ren, 2010
