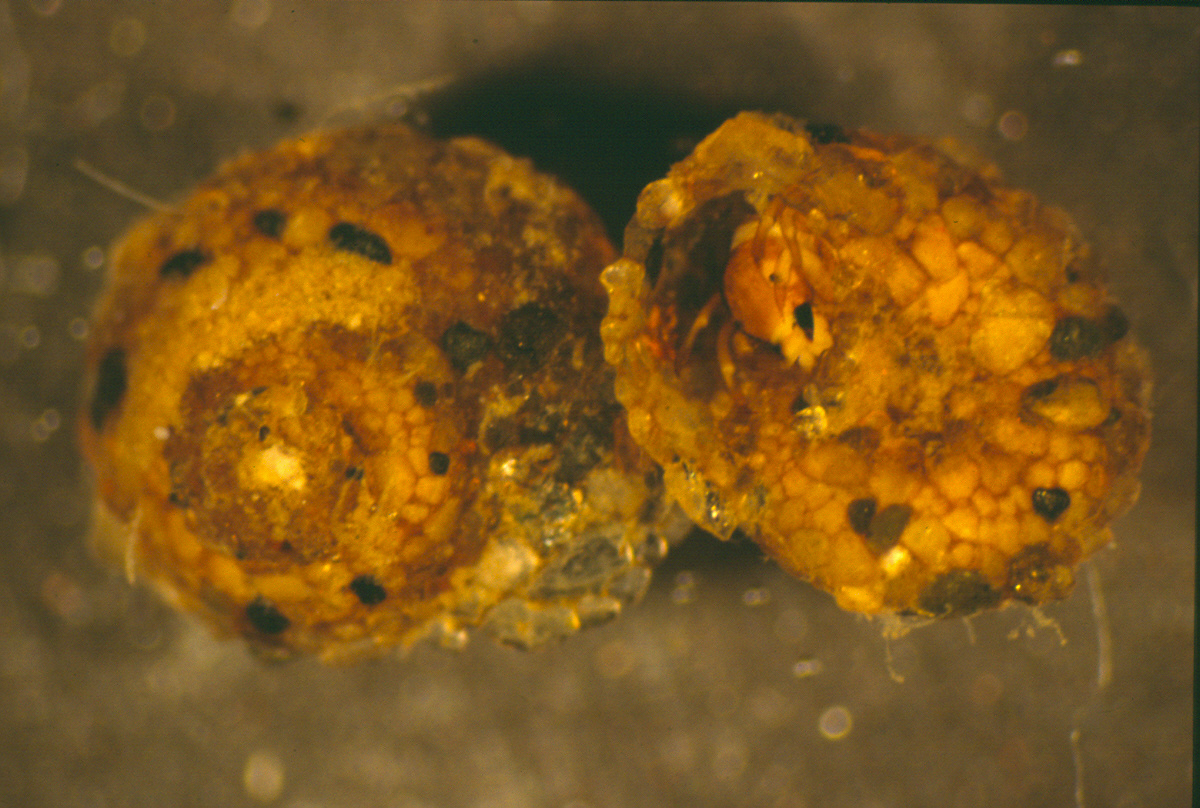
- Helicopsyche borealis

Scientific classification
- Kingdom: Animalia
- Phylum: Arthropoda
- Clade: Pancrustacea
- Class: Insecta
- Order: Trichoptera
- Family: Helicopsychidae
- Genus: Helicopsyche von Siebold, 1856

Subgenera
- Cochliopsyche; Petrotrichia; Helicopsyche; Feropsyche; Saetotrica; Galeopsyche

= Helicopsyche =

Genus of caddisflies

Helicopsyche is a genus of Trichoptera, the caddisflies. Helicopsyche contains more than 230 species and are represented on all major faunal regions with highest diversity in tropical and sub-tropical regions. The genus was first described by Siebold, 1856.

The abundance and wide distribution of the genus makes it important to fly fishing anglers, who know it as the "Speckled Peter".

== Diagnosis ==
=== Larva ===
The case is dextrally coiled, with coils usually completely fused. Head is oval in dorsal view and smooth except for long setae and lateral carina. In lateral view the head has a trianguloid shape with the dorsal margin straight or slightly concave. Pronotum is strongly sclerotized while meso-and metantoum are weakly sclerotized. Anal claw with a single row of comb shaped hooks. Abdominal gills either are present or absent.

=== Adult ===
The maxillary palps are 2-, 3-, or 4-jointed. Antennae as long as fore wing or two times longer than fore wing length. Cephalic warts variable. One pair of oblong central warts on pronotum. Mesonotum either has setal warts or not. Metanotum always with setal warts. Postscutellar line present. Male and females have similar fore wings.

== Phylogenetic relationship ==
Helicopsyche probably forms the sister group to Rakiura McFarlane, 1973. The genus is monophyletic, since the Cochliopsyche was included by Johanson 2003. Cochliopsyche was formerly introduced by Müller (1885) as another genus within Helicopsychidae with spur formula 1, 2, 2, and very long antennae, which give them a leptocerid-like appearance. Helicopsyche now contains the six following subgenera Cochilopsyche Müller, 1885 (16 species); Petrotrichia Ulmer, 1910; Helicopsyche (subgenus) Siebold, 1856; Feropsyche Johanson, 1998 (73 species); Saetotricha Brauer, 1865; Galeopsyche.

== Distribution ==
Europe: Italy, France, Portugal, Corsica, Bulgaria, Greece, Romania, Switzerland, Spain.

Asia: Sri Lanka, Thailand, India, Indonesia, Burma, Japan, Vietnam, China, Hong-Kong, Malaysia, Nepal, North Korea.

Oceania: Australia, New Zealand, New Caledonia.

Africa: Tanzania, Zaire, Seychelles, Madagascar, Zimbabwe.

Americas: Dominican Republic, Colombia, Ecuador, Venezuela, Dominica, Peru, Canada, Costa Rica, Guatemala, Mexico, Panama, United States, Chile, Brazil, Cuba, Jamaica, Nicaragua, Grenada, Guadeloupe, Martinique, St. Lucia, Haiti, El Salvador, Hispaniola, Trinidad, Paraguay, Puerto Rico, Honduras, Suriname.
