= Miomoptera =

Miomoptera Temporal range: 318–176 Ma Middle Carboniferous - Middle Jurassic

Scientific classification
- Domain: Eukaryota
- Kingdom: Animalia
- Phylum: Arthropoda
- Class: Insecta
- Clade: Eumetabola
- Order: †Miomoptera; Martynov, 1928

Families
- Metropatoridae; Archaemiopteridae; Palaeomanteidae

Synonyms
- Palaeomanteida

Extinct order of insects

Miomoptera is an extinct order of insects. Although it is thought to be a common ancestor of all holometabolous insects, because no smooth transition between Miomoptera and other holometabolous insect orders is known, it is considered to be in a separate order unto itself.

The Miomopterans were small insects, with unspecialised chewing mandibles and short abdominal cerci. They had four wings of equal size, with a relatively simple venation, similar to that of the more primitive living holometabolous insects, such as lacewings.

Adult morphology suggests the adults lived in open habitats. The morphology and gut content shows they fed on the pollen and strobili of gymnosperms. Based on the morphology of the ovipositor, larvae also fed on the pollen of strobili, moving between the scales from one microsporangium to another.

== Families and genera ==
- Metropatoridae
  - Metropator
- Archaemiopteridae Guthorl, 1939
  - Archaemioptera
  - Eodelopterum
  - Saaromioptera
  - Tychtodelopterum
- Palaeomanteidae Handlirsch, 1906
  - Palaeomantis
  - Delopterum
  - Miomatoneura
  - Miomatoneurella
  - Permodelopterum
  - Perunopterum
- Permosialidae Martynov, 1928
  - Epimastax Martynov, 1928
  - Permonka Riek, 1973
  - Sarbalopterodes Storozhenko, 1991
  - Permosialis Martynov, 1928
