= Jindřich Uzel =

Czech entomologist (1868–1946)

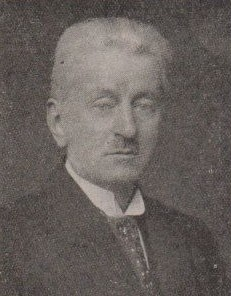

Jindřich Uzel Germanized as Heinrich Uzel (10 March 1868 – 19 May 1946) was a Czech naturalist, entomologist and plant pathologist. For his pioneering monograph on the thrips, he has been called the father of Thysanoptera studies. The genus Uzelothrips in the family Uzelothripidae is named in his honour.

Uzel was born in Chomutov then in the Austro-Hungarian Empire but grew up at Hradec Králové (Königgrätz) where he took an interest in nature thanks to his father Vincenc, a high school teacher. He studied at Charles University in Prague followed by studies in embryology and histology at Berlin. He published a monograph on the Thysanoptera in 1895. In 1905 he was made a special member of the Royal Czech Academy. Uzel worked briefly at the State Botanical Garden in Peradenia, Ceylon (Sri Lanka) followed by work on plant pathology at the sugar beet production research station in Prague and as a professor at the Czech Technical College from 1920.
