= Liadytidae =

Liadytidae Temporal range: Toarcian–Aptian

Scientific classification
- Domain: Eukaryota
- Kingdom: Animalia
- Phylum: Arthropoda
- Class: Insecta
- Order: Coleoptera
- Suborder: Adephaga
- Family: †Liadytidae; Ponomarenko, 1977

Family of beetles

Liadytidae is an extinct family of adephagan beetles. There are at least two genera and about seven described species in Liadytidae. They are known from the Early Jurassic to Early Cretaceous of Asia. They are members of the clade Dytiscoidea, and like other members of that group were adapted for aquatic life.

== Genera ==
These two genera belong to the family Liadytidae:

- † Liadytes Ponomarenko, 1963
- † Ovidytes Ren, Zhu & Lu, 1995
