= Perforissidae =

Perforissidae Temporal range: Barremian–Santonian

Scientific classification
- Kingdom: Animalia
- Phylum: Arthropoda
- Clade: Pancrustacea
- Class: Insecta
- Order: Hemiptera
- Suborder: Auchenorrhyncha
- Infraorder: Fulgoromorpha
- Superfamily: Fulgoroidea
- Family: †Perforissidae; Shcherbakov 2007

Genera
- See text

Extinct family of true bugs

Perforissidae is an extinct family of planthoppers. They are considered to belong to the group of "Cixiidae-like" planthoppers. Species are known from the Early to Late Cretaceous of Eurasia, North America and South America. The family was named by Shcherbakov in 2007

== Taxonomy ==
- †subfamily Cixitettiginae Shcherbakov 2007
  - †Aafrita Szwedo and Azar 2013 Lebanese amber, Barremian
  - †Cixitettix Shcherbakov 2007 Taimyr amber, Russia, Santonian
  - †Foveopsis Shcherbakov 2007 Burmese amber, Myanmar, Cenomanian
    - †Foveopsis fennahi Shcherbakov 2007
    - †Foveopsis heteroidea Zhang et al. 2017
  - †Iberofoveopsis Peñalver and Szwedo 2010 San Just amber, Escucha Formation, Albian
  - †Lanlakawa Luo et al. 2020 Burmese amber, Myanmar, Cenomanian
  - †Tsaganema Shcherbakov 2007 Dzun-Bain Formation, Mongolia, Aptian
- †subfamily Perforissinae Shcherbakov 2007
  - †Cretargus Shcherbakov 2007 Taimyr amber, Russia, Santonian
  - †Perforissus Shcherbakov 2007 New Jersey amber, Turonian
- †Aonikenkissus Petrulevicius et al. 2014 Mata Amarilla Formation, Argentina, Cenomanian
