= Ashanga =

Ashanga Ашанга
- Ulus
- Location within Republic of Buryatia Location within Russia
- Coordinates: 52°22′N 110°15′E
- Country: Russia
- Region: Republic of Buryatia
- District: Khorinsky District
- Time zone: UTC+8:00

Ashanga (Russian: Ашанга) is a rural locality (an ulus) in Khorinsky District, Republic of Buryatia, Russia. The population was 223 as of 2010. There are five streets.

== Geography ==
Ashanga is located 45 km northeast of Khorinsk (the district's administrative centre) by road. Amgalanta is the nearest rural locality.
