= Mesodytes =

Mesodytes Temporal range: Barremian–Aptian

Scientific classification
- Domain: Eukaryota
- Kingdom: Animalia
- Phylum: Arthropoda
- Class: Insecta
- Order: Coleoptera
- Suborder: Adephaga
- Family: Dytiscidae
- Subfamily: †Liadytiscinae
- Tribe: †Mesoderini
- Genus: †Mesodytes; Prokin, Petrov, Wang & Ponomarenko, 2013
- Species: †M. rhantoides

Binomial name
- †Mesodytes rhantoides Prokin, Petrov, B. Wang & Ponomarenko, 2013

Genus of beetles

Mesodytes is an extinct genus of predaceous diving beetles in the family Dytiscidae. There is one described species in Mesodytes, M. rhantoides.
