= Uzelothrips =

Uzelothrips Temporal range: 55.8–0 Ma Lower Eocene – Recent

Scientific classification
- Domain: Eukaryota
- Kingdom: Animalia
- Phylum: Arthropoda
- Class: Insecta
- Order: Thysanoptera
- Suborder: Terebrantia
- Family: Uzelothripidae; Hood, 1952
- Genus: Uzelothrips; Hood, 1952

Genus of thrips

Uzelothrips is a genus of thrips, and the only genus in the family Uzelothripidae. Up until 2012 it contained a single species, U. scabrosus, known from Belém, Brazil; Brisbane, Australia; Singapore, and Angola. In 2012 a new extinct species, U. eocenicus, was described from the lowermost Eocene of France by Patricia Nel and André Nel in 2012. The species name refers to the age it existed in. The group name is in honour of Jindřich (or Heinrich) Uzel, a Czech entomologist who published the first monograph on the thrips. The family is identified by the whip-like tip to the antenna.

U. scabrosus is known to inhabit dead debris from plants in the genera Hevea and Bixa, as well as the species Eucalyptus major.

== Species ==
- †Uzelothrips eocenicus
- Uzelothrips scabrosus
