= Tunguskagyrus =

Tunguskagyrus Temporal range: Lopingian

Scientific classification
- Kingdom: Animalia
- Phylum: Arthropoda
- Clade: Pancrustacea
- Class: Insecta
- Order: Coleoptera
- Suborder: Adephaga
- Family: Gyrinidae
- Genus: †Tunguskagyrus; Yan et al., 2018

Type species
- Tunguskagyrus planus Yan et al., 2018

Other species
- Tunguskagyrus yani Ponomarenko, 2021

Extinct genus of gyrinid coleopteran

Tunguskagyrus is an extinct taxon of gyrinid beetle that lived in Siberia during the Lopingian epoch.

== Etymology ==
The generic name Tunguskagyrus derives from the Tunguska River and the beetle genus Gyrinus. The specific epithet of the type species, Tunguskagyrus planus, references the flattened body of the insect.
