= Cretodytes =

Cretodytes Temporal range: Barremian–Turonian

Scientific classification
- Domain: Eukaryota
- Kingdom: Animalia
- Phylum: Arthropoda
- Class: Insecta
- Order: Coleoptera
- Suborder: Adephaga
- Family: Dytiscidae
- Subfamily: incertae sedis
- Genus: †Cretodytes; Ponomarenko, 1977

Genus of beetles

Cretodytes is an extinct genus of beetles in the family Dytiscidae, containing the following species:

- Cretodytes incertus Prokin, Petrov, Wang & Ponomarenko, 2013 Doronino Formation, Russia, Early Cretaceous (Barremian)
- Cretodytes latipes Ponomarenko, 1977 Kzyl-Zhar, Kazakhstan, Late Cretaceous (Turonian)
