= Choristopsychidae =

Choristopsychidae Temporal range: Pliensbachian–Oxfordian
- Paristopsyche angelineae

Scientific classification
- Domain: Eukaryota
- Kingdom: Animalia
- Phylum: Arthropoda
- Class: Insecta
- Order: Mecoptera
- Family: †Choristopsychidae; Martynov, 1937

Genera
- †Choristopsyche; †Paristopsyche

Extinct family of insects

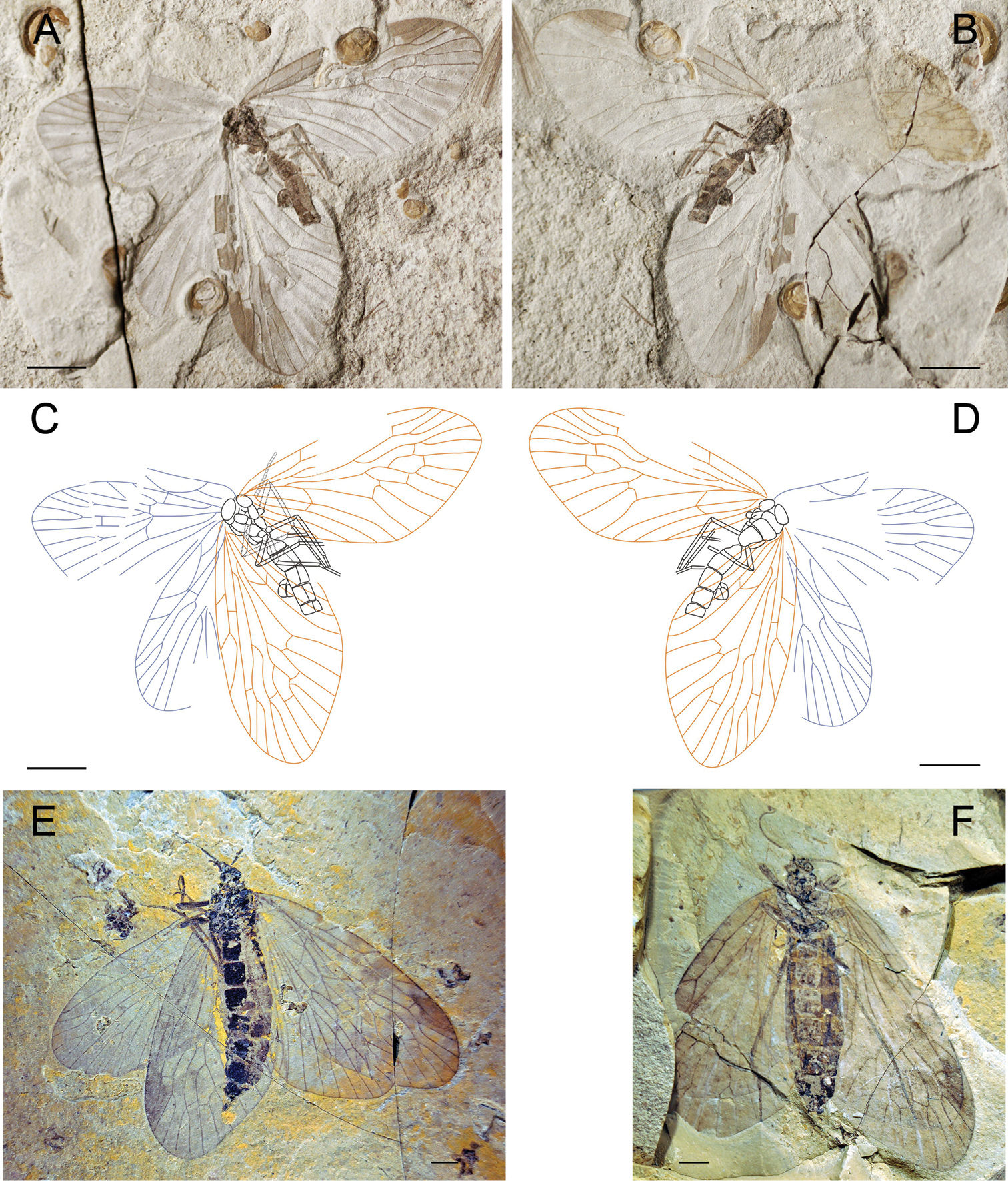
Fossils of Choristopsyche asticta

Choristopsychidae is an extinct family of scorpionflies, known from the Jurassic of Asia. The family was erected by Andrey Vasilyevich Martynov in 1937 to house Choristopsyche tenuinervis from the Early Jurassic (Pliensbachian) aged Sulyukta Formation in Kyrgyzstan. In 2013, two additional species in the genus Choristopsyche (C. perfecta and C. asticta) as well as a new second genus Paristopsyche containing the single species Paristopsyche angelineae were described from the Middle-Late Jurassic Jiulongshan Formation of Inner Mongolia, China. The family is noted for its distinctive broad wing shape, unique amongst mecopterans. Several members of the family have a distinct spotting pattern on the forewings.
