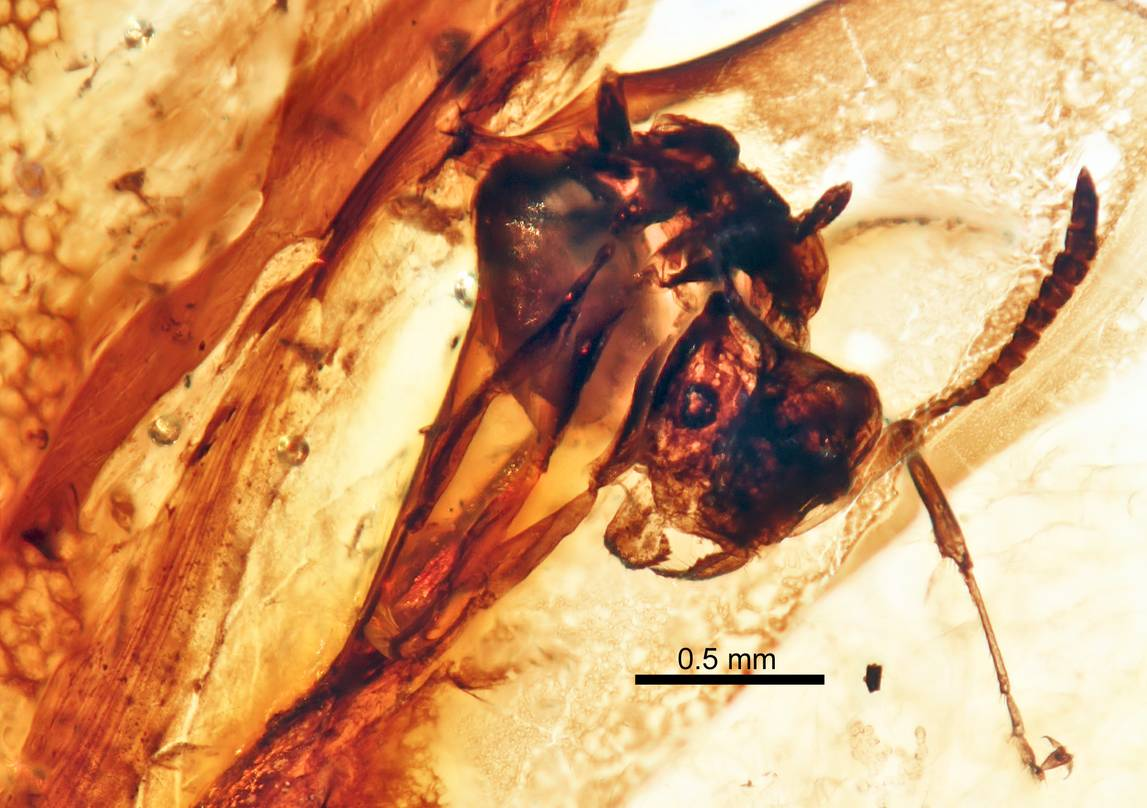

Scientific classification
- Domain: Eukaryota
- Kingdom: Animalia
- Phylum: Arthropoda
- Class: Insecta
- Order: Hymenoptera
- Family: Formicidae
- Subfamily: Dolichoderinae
- Tribe: Leptomyrmecini
- Genus: †Chronomyrmex; McKellar, Glasier & Engel, 2013
- Species: †C. medicinehatensis

Binomial name
- †Chronomyrmex medicinehatensis McKellar, Glasier & Engel, 2013

= Chronomyrmex =

Chronomyrmex Temporal range: Late Cretaceous

Genus of ants

Chronomyrmex is an extinct genus of ants of the subfamily Dolichoderinae. The genus only contains a single species Chronomyrmex medicinehatensis, discovered in Canada and described in 2013.
