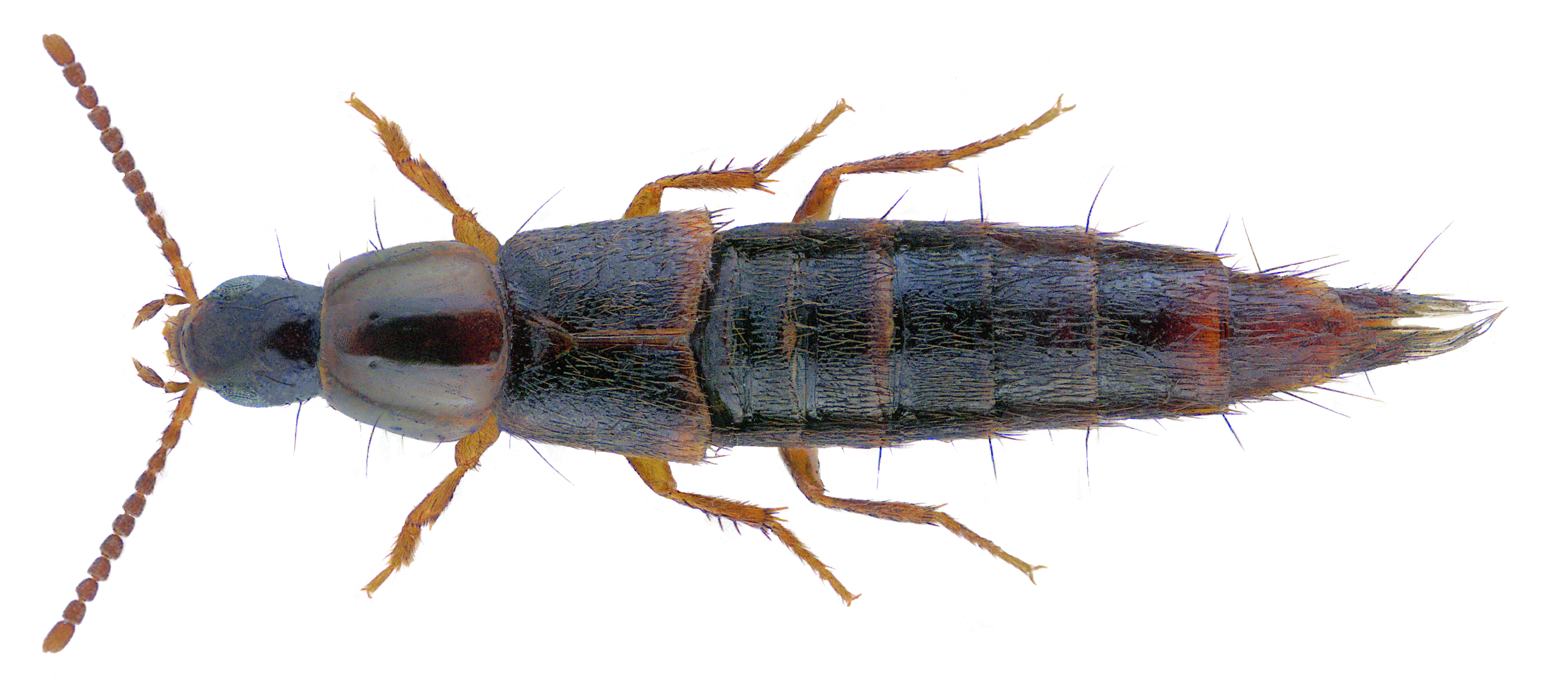
- Heterothops dissimilis

Scientific classification
- Kingdom: Animalia
- Phylum: Arthropoda
- Clade: Pancrustacea
- Class: Insecta
- Order: Coleoptera
- Suborder: Polyphaga
- Infraorder: Staphyliniformia
- Family: Staphylinidae
- Genus: Heterothops; Stephens, 1829

= Heterothops =

Genus of beetles

Heterothops is a genus of beetles belonging to the family Staphylinidae.

The genus has cosmopolitan distribution.

Species:

- Heterothops aeneiventris Smetana, 1971
- Heterothops amabilis Last, 1975
- Heterothops cognatus Sharp, 1874
- Heterothops conformis Smetana, 1971
- Heterothops praevius Erichson, 1839
- Heterothops sordidus Smetana, 1971
