= Glosselytrodea =

Glosselytrodea Temporal range: Permian–Upper Jurassic

Scientific classification
- Kingdom: Animalia
- Phylum: Arthropoda
- Clade: Pancrustacea
- Class: Insecta
- Cohort: Polyneoptera
- Order: †Glosselytrodea; Martynov, 1938

Families
- See text

Synonyms
- Jurinida Zalessky, 1929

Extinct order of insects

Glosselytrodea is an extinct order of insects, containing about thirty species. Its fossil record dates from the Permian to the Upper Jurassic, and is distributed across Eurasia, the Americas, and Australia. Its classification is uncertain, but may be closely related to Neuropterida or Polyneoptera (Orthopteroidea). While many details of their anatomy remain unclear, the wing venation of Permoberothidae resembles that of Neuropterida, whereas the wing venation of most other taxa is closer to that of orthopteroids (and thus Permoberothidae may not be closely related to the rest).

== Families and genera ==
After:

- Archoglossopteridae Martynova, 1958
  - Archoglossopterum Martynova, 1958 – Mitina Formation, Russia, Middle Permian (Roadian)
- Glosselytridae Martynov, 1938 (Synonym: Uskatelytridae Martynova, 1952)
  - Glosselytron Martynov, 1938 – Iva-Gora Beds Formation, Russia, Middle Permian (Roadian)
  - Karajurina Novokshonov and Vilesov, 1994 – Ak-Kolka Formation, Kazakhstan, Late Permian (Changhsingian); Poldarsa Formation, Russia, Late Permian (Wuchiapingian)
  - Mongolojurina Ponomarenko, 1988 – Bakhar Formation, Mongolia, Middle Jurassic (Aalenian/Bajocian); Tsanhin Formation, Mongolia, Late Permian (Capitanian/Wuchiapingian)
  - Sinojurina Huang, Nel, Lin and Dong, 2007 – Yinping Formation, China, Middle Permian (Capitanian)
  - Uskatelytrum Martynova, 1952 – Gramoteino Formation, Russia, Late Permian (Wuchiapingian)
- Glossopteridae Sharov, 1966
  - Glossopterum Sharov, 1966 – Chekarda site, Koshelevka Formation, Russia, Early Permian (Kungurian)
- Jurinidae Zalessky, 1929 (Synonyms: Anorthoneuridae Martynov, 1938; Eoglosselytridae Martynova, 1952)
  - Eoglosselytrum Martynova, 1952 – Mitino Formation, Middle Permian (Roadian); Croudance Bay Formation, Australia, Late Permian (Changhsingian); Ak-Kolka Formation, Kazakhstan, Late Permian (Changhsingian); Udmurtia (Chepanikha, Rossokha River Valley), Russia, Middle Permian (Wordian); Vyazovka Formation, Russia, Middle Permian (Capitanian)
  - Isadelytron Rasnitsyn and Aristov, 2013 – Poldarsa Formation, Russia, Late Permian (Wuchiapingian); Udmurtia (Chepanikha, Rossokha River Valley), Russia, Middle Permian (Wordian)
  - Jurina Zalessky, 1929 – Baitugan Formation, Russia, Middle Permian (Roadian); Iva-Gora Beds Formation, Russia, Middle Permian (Roadian)
  - Ladinoglosselytron Hong, 2007 – Tongchuan Formation, China, Middle Triassic (Ladinian)
  - Mesojurina Martynova, 1943 – Dzhil Formation, Kyrgyzstan, Early Jurassic (Hettangian/Sinemurian)
  - Protojurina Martynova, 1958 – Kazankovo-Markino, Russian, Middle Permian (Wordian)
  - Shaanxiglosselytron Hong, 2007 – Tongchuan Formation, China, Middle Triassic (Ladinian)
  - Sinoglosselytron Hong, 2007 – Tongchuan Formation, China, Middle Triassic (Ladinian)
  - Surijoka Martynova, 1958 – Kazankovo-Markino, Russian, Middle Permian (Wordian); Salagou Formation, France, Early Permian (Kungurian)
- Permoberothidae Tillyard, 1932
  - Moscheloptera Pérez‐de la Fuente, Nel and Poschmann, 2022 – Meisenheim Formation, Germany, Early Permian (Asselian–?Sakmarian)
  - Permoberotha Tillyard, 1932 – Wellington Formation, Kansas, United States, Early Permian (Artinskian)
  - Sylvaelytron Novokshonov, 1998 – Chekarda site, Koshelevka Formation, Russia, Early Permian (Kungurian)
- Polycytellidae Martynova, 1952
  - Argentinoglosselytrina Martins-Neto and Gallego, 2001 – Los Rastros Formation, Argentina, Late Triassic (Carnian)
  - Moltenojurina Béthoux and Anderson, 2021 – Molteno Formation, South Africa, Late Triassic (early Carnian)
  - Polycytella Tillyard, 1922 – Blackstone Formation, Australia, Late Triassic (Carnian-lowermost Norian); Molteno Formation, South Africa, Late Triassic (early Carnian)
