= Liadyxianus =

Liadyxianus Temporal range: Barremian–Aptian

Scientific classification
- Domain: Eukaryota
- Kingdom: Animalia
- Phylum: Arthropoda
- Class: Insecta
- Order: Coleoptera
- Suborder: Adephaga
- Family: Dytiscidae
- Subfamily: †Liadytiscinae
- Tribe: †Liadytiscini
- Genus: †Liadyxianus; Prokin, Petrov, B. Wang & Ponomarenko, 2013
- Species: †L. kirejtshuki

Binomial name
- †Liadyxianus kirejtshuki Prokin, Petrov, B. Wang & Ponomarenko, 2013

Genus of beetles

Liadyxianus is an extinct genus of predaceous diving beetles in the family Dytiscidae. There is one described species in Liadyxianus, L. kirejtshuki.
