= Kuplya =

Kuplya Купля
- Village
- Location within Vladimir Oblast Location within Russia
- Coordinates: 56°08′N 42°37′E
- Country: Russia
- Region: Vladimir Oblast
- District: Gorokhovetsky District
- Time zone: UTC+3:00

Kuplya (Russian: Купля) is a rural locality (a village) in Kupriyanovskoye Rural Settlement, Gorokhovetsky District, Vladimir Oblast, Russia. The population was 2 as of 2010. There are 3 streets.

== Geography ==
Kuplya is located 13 km southwest of Gorokhovets (the district's administrative centre) by road. Novovladimirovka is the nearest rural locality.
