= 2012 in paleoentomology =

This list of 2012 in paleoentomology records new fossil insect taxa that were described during the year, as well as documents significant paleoentomology discoveries and events which occurred during that year.

== Blattodea ==
Name	Novelty	Status	Authors	Age	Unit	Location	Notes	Images
Archimesoblatta shiva	Sp. nov	Valid	Engel & Pérez-de La Fuente	Middle Jurassic	Kota Formation	India	A mesoblattinid cockroach	
Arcofuzia	Gen. et sp. nov	Valid	Wei, Shih & Ren	Middle Jurassic	Jiulongshan Formation	China	A fuziid cockroach. The type species is Arcofuzia cana.	
Cariblattoides labandeirai	Sp. nov	Valid	Vršanský et al.	Eocene; Bridgerian	Green River Formation; Lake Unita	United States; Colorado	A Pseudophyllodromiine wood cockroach	
Divocina	Gen. et sp. nov.	Valid	Liang, Vršanský & Ren	Middle Jurassic (Bathonian)	Jiulongshan Formation	China	A raphidiomimid cockroach. The type species is Divocina noci.	
Entropia	Gen. et sp. nov	Valid	Vršanský, Liang & Ren	Middle Jurassic (Bathonian)		China	A liberiblattinid cockroach. The type species is Entropia initialis.	
Graciliblatta	Gen. et sp. nov	Valid	Liang, Huang & Ren	Middle Jurassic	Jiulongshan Formation	China	A raphidiomimid cockroach. The type species is Graciliblatta bella.	
Mutovia	Gen. et sp. nov	Valid	Vršanský & Aristov	Late Permian		Russia	A mutoviid cockroach. The type species is Mutovia intercalaria.	
Parvifuzia peregrina	Sp. nov	Valid	Wei, Liang & Ren	Middle Jurassic	Jiulongshan Formation	China	A fuziid cockroach, a species of Parvifuzia.	
Qilianiblatta	Sp. nov	Valid	Zhang, Schneider & Hong	Carboniferous (earliest Pennsylvanian)		China	A cockroach. The type species is Qilianiblatta namurensis.	
Stegoblatta	Gen. et sp. nov	Valid	Anisyutkin & Gröhn	Eocene	Baltic amber	Europe	A blaberid cockroach. The type species is Stegoblatta irmgardgroehni.	

== Coleoptera ==
Name	Novelty	Status	Authors	Age	Unit	Location	Notes	Images
Abrocar concavus	Sp. nov	Valid	Davis et al.	Early Cretaceous	Yixian Formation	China	A weevil, a species of Abrocar.	
Abrocar relicinus	Sp. nov	Valid	Davis et al.	Early Cretaceous	Yixian Formation	China	A weevil, a species of Abrocar.	
Abrohadeocoleodes	Gen. et 4 sp. nov	Valid	Tan et al.	Middle Jurassic	Jiulongshan Formation	China	A schizophorid archostematan beetle. Genus contains four species: A. eurycladus, A. ooideus, A. nii and A. patefactus.	
Alloioscarabaeus	Gen. et sp. nov	Valid	Bai, Ren & Yang in Bai et al.	Middle Jurassic	Jiulongshan Formation	China	An alloioscarabaeid scarabaeoid beetle. The type species is Alloioscarabaeus cheni.	
Alphitopsis	Gen. et sp. nov	Valid	Kirejtshuk, Nabozhenko & Nel	Early Cretaceous	Yixian Formation	China	A tenebrionine darkling beetle. The type species is Alphitopsis initialis.	
Anotylus archaicus	sp nov	Valid	Yue, Makranczy & Ren	Early Cretaceous	Yixian Formation	China	An oxyteline rove beetle, a species of Anotylus.	
Aphebodactyla	Gen. et sp. nov	Valid	Chatzimanolis et al.	Cretaceous	Burmese amber	Myanmar	A ptilodactylid byrrhoid beetle. The type species is Aphebodactyla rhetine.	
Aploceble (Chalcoaploceble) viridiaeneus	Subgen. et sp. nov	Valid	Tshernyshev	Eocene	Baltic amber	Russia (Kaliningrad Oblast)	A melyrid beetle belonging to the subfamily Dasytinae, a subgenus and species of Aploceble.	
Apticax	Gen. et 2 sp. nov	Valid	Schomann & Solodovnikov	Early Cretaceous (Aptian–Albian)	Crato Formation	Brazil	A rove beetle of uncertain phylogenetic placement. The type species is A. volans; genus also includes A. solidus.	
Archaeosciaphilus	Gen. et sp. nov	Valid	Legalov	Eocene		Europe	A curculionid beetle found in Baltic amber. The type species is Archaeosciaphilus marshalli.	
Attagenus yantarnyi	Sp. nov	Valid	Háva & Bukejs	Late Eocene	Prussian Formation	Russia (Kaliningrad Oblast)	A dermestid beetle found in Baltic amber, a species of Attagenus.	
Baltocar groehni	Sp. nov	Valid	Riedel in Riedel et al.	Eocene	Baltic amber	Russia (Kaliningrad Oblast)	A weevil belonging to the family Attelabidae.	
Baltocar hoffeinsorum	Sp. nov	Valid	Riedel in Riedel et al.	Eocene	Baltic amber	Russia (Kaliningrad Oblast)	A weevil belonging to the family Attelabidae.	
Baltocar subnudus	Sp. nov	Valid	Riedel in Riedel et al.	Eocene	Baltic amber	Russia (Kaliningrad Oblast)	A weevil belonging to the family Attelabidae.	
Cartodere (Aridius) succinobaltica	Sp. nov	Valid	Bukejs, Rücker & Kirejtshuk	Late Eocene		Europe	A latridiid beetle found in Baltic amber, a species of Cartodere.	
Catops perkovskyi	Sp. nov	Valid	Perreau	Eocene		Russia (Kaliningrad Oblast)	A leiodid beetle found in Baltic amber, a species of Catops.	
Conapium (Palaeoconapion) alleni	Subgen. et sp. nov	Valid	Legalov	Eocene	Baltic amber	Russia (Kaliningrad Oblast)	A beetle belonging to the family Brentidae, a subgenus and species of Conapium.	
Crassisorus	Gen. et sp. nov	Valid	Nikolajev, Wang & Zhang	Early Cretaceous	Yixian Formation	China	A member of the family Hybosoridae. The type species is C. fractus.	
Cretohypna	Gen. et sp. nov	Valid	Yan, Nikolajev & Ren	Early Cretaceous	Yixian Formation	China	A glaphyrid beetle. The type species is Cretohypna cristata.	
Cretotanaos	Gen. et sp. nov	Valid	Legalov	Early Cretaceous (Aptian)		Mongolia	An apionine brentid weevil. Type species is Cretotanaos bontsaganensis.	
Cryptophagus harenus	Sp. nov	Valid	Lyubarsky & Perkovsky	Late Eocene		Ukraine	A cryptophagid beetle found in Rovno amber, a species of Cryptophagus.	
Electotreta	Gen. et sp.	Valid	Kazantsev	Eocene		Lithuania	A firefly. The type species is Electotreta rasnitsyni.	
Electromethes	Gen. et sp. nov	Valid	Kazantsev	Eocene		Lithuania	An omethid beetle. The type species is Electromethes alleni.	
Electropteron	Gen. et sp. nov	Valid	Kazantsev	Oligocene		Dominican Republic	A lycid. The type species is E. avus.	
Elodes beigeli	Sp. nov	Valid	Klausnitzer	Eocene		Europe	A scirtid beetle found in Baltic amber, a species of Elodes.	
Elodes mysticopalpalis	Sp. nov	Valid	Klausnitzer	Eocene		Europe	A scirtid beetle found in Baltic amber, a species of Elodes.	
Enicmus adrianae	Sp. nov	Valid	Bukejs, Reike & Rücker	Late Eocene		Russia (Kaliningrad Oblast)	A member of Latridiidae found in Baltic amber, a species of Enicmus.	
Eocenorhynchites	Gen. et sp. nov	Valid	Legalov	Eocene		Europe	A rhynchitid beetle found in Baltic amber. The type species is Eocenorhynchites vossi.	
Eodromeus daohugouensis	sp nov	Valid	Wang, Zhang and Ponomarenko	Middle Jurassic	Daohugou Beds	China	A trachypachid, a species of Eodromeus.	
Eodromeus robustus	sp nov	Valid	Wang, Zhang and Ponomarenko	Middle Jurassic	Daohugou Beds	China	A trachypachid, a species of Eodromeus.	
Eoluciola	Gen. et sp. nov	Valid	Kazantsev	Eocene		Europe (Baltic Sea coast)	A lucioline firefly found in Baltic amber. The type species is Eoluciola varang.	
Euroleptochromus	Gen. et sp. nov	Valid	Jałoszyński	Eocene		Lithuania	A rove beetle found in Lithuanian Eocene Baltic amber. The type species is Euroleptochromus sabathi.	
Helophorus (Mesosperchus) inceptivus	Sp. nov	Valid	Fikáček et al.	Late Jurassic		Mongolia	A hydrophiloid beetle, a species of Helophorus.	
Helophorus (Mesosperchus) yixianus	Sp. nov	Valid	Fikáček et al.	Jurassic-Cretaceous boundary	Yixian Formation	China	A hydrophiloid beetle, a species of Helophorus.	
Hydroscapha? jeholensis	Sp. nov	Valid	Cai, Short & Huang	Early Cretaceous	Yixian Formation	China	A member of the family Hydroscaphidae.	
Juroglypholoma	Gen. et sp. nov	Valid	Cai et al.	Middle Jurassic	Daohugou Beds	China	A glypholomatine rove beetle. The type species is Juroglypholoma antiquum.	
Kararhynchus gratshevi	Species	Valid	Legalov	Middle-Late Jurassic	Karabastau Formation	Kazakhstan	An obrieniid beetle, a species of Kararhynchus.	
Kararhynchus jurassicus	Species	Valid	Legalov	Middle-Late Jurassic	Karabastau Formation	Kazakhstan	An obrieniid beetle, a species of Kararhynchus.	
Laetopsia	Gen. et comb. nov	Valid	Fikáček et al.	Early Cretaceous		China; Mongolia; Russia	A hydrophiloid beetle; a new genus for "Hydrophilopsia" baissensis Ponomarenko (1987), "H." bontsaganica Prokin (2009), "H." hydraenoides Prokin, Ren & Fikáček (2010), "H." mongolica Ponomarenko (1987) and "H." shatrovskiyi Prokin, Ren & Fikáček (2010).	
Lasiosyne cataphracta	Sp. nov	Valid	Yan	Early Cretaceous		Mongolia	A lasiosynid beetle, a species of Lasiosyne.	
Lasiosyne decora	Sp. nov	Valid	Yan	Early Cretaceous		Russia	A lasiosynid beetle, a species of Lasiosyne.	
Lasiosyne insculpta	Sp. nov	Valid	Yan	Late Jurassic		Mongolia	A lasiosynid beetle, a species of Lasiosyne.	
Lasiosyne longitarsa	Sp. nov	Valid	Yan	Late Jurassic		Mongolia	A lasiosynid beetle, a species of Lasiosyne.	
Lasiosyne punctata	Sp. nov	Valid	Yan	Early Cretaceous		Mongolia	A lasiosynid beetle, a species of Lasiosyne.	
Lasiosyne shartegiensis	Sp. nov	Valid	Yan	Late Jurassic		Mongolia	A lasiosynid beetle, a species of Lasiosyne.	
Leehermania	Gen. et sp. nov	Valid	Chatzimanolis, Grimaldi & Engel in Chatzimanolis et al.	Late Triassic (late Carnian or early Norian)	Cow Branch Formation	United States	A beetle of uncertain phylogenetic placement, might be the earliest known rove beetle or a member of Myxophaga related to the family Hydroscaphidae. The type species is Leehermania prorova.	
Lithohypna lepticephala	Sp. nov	Valid	Nikolajev & Ren	Early Cretaceous	Yixian Formation	China	A beetle belonging to the family Glaphyridae, a species of Lithohypna.	
Lithohypna longula	Sp. nov	Valid	Nikolajev & Ren	Early Cretaceous	Yixian Formation	China	A beetle belonging to the family Glaphyridae, a species of Lithohypna.	
Lithohypna tuberculata	Sp. nov	Valid	Nikolajev & Ren	Early Cretaceous	Yixian Formation	China	A beetle belonging to the family Glaphyridae, a species of Lithohypna.	
Lithohypna yuxiana	Sp. nov	Valid	Nikolajev & Ren	Early Cretaceous	Yixian Formation	China	A beetle belonging to the family Glaphyridae, a species of Lithohypna.	
Macratria alleni	Sp. nov	Valid	Telnov	Late Eocene		Latvia or Lithuania	A macratriine anthicid beetle found in Baltic amber, a species of Macratria.	
Melanapion (Melanapionoides) wanati	Subgen. et sp. nov	Valid	Legalov	Eocene	Baltic amber	Russia (Kaliningrad Oblast)	A beetle belonging to the family Brentidae, a subgenus and species of Melanapion.	
Menopraesagus oryziformis	Sp. nov	Valid	Tan et al.	Middle Jurassic	Jiulongshan Formation	China	A schizophorid archostematan beetle, a species of Menopraesagus.	
Nephus subcircularis	Sp. nov	Valid	Kirejtshuk & Nel	Earliest Eocene		France	A scymnine coccinellid beetle found in Oise amber, as species of Nephus	
Notocupes lini	Sp. nov	Valid	Ponomarenko et al.	Early Jurassic		China	Originally described as a species of Notocupes; Kirejtshuk (2020) transferred this species to the genus Zygadenia.	
Olemehlia	Gen. et sp. nov	Junior homonym	Batelka	Eocene (Lutetian)	Baltic amber	Lithuania	A member of the family Ripiphoridae belonging to the subfamily Ripidiinae. The type species is O. krali. The generic name is preoccupied by Olemehlia Holzschuh (2011); Batelka (2017) coined a replacement name Olemehliella.	
Omma delicata	Sp. nov		Tan et al.	Middle Jurassic	Jiulongshan Formation	China	A species of Omma	
Orchesia (Orchestera) turkini	Sp. nov	Valid	Alekseev & Bukejs	Late Eocene	Prussian Formation	Russia (Kaliningrad Oblast)	A melandryid beetle found in Baltic amber, a species of Orchesia.	
Palaeoerirhinus	Gen. et 4 sp. nov	Valid	Legalov	Early Cretaceous (Aptian)		Mongolia	A curculionid weevil. Type species is Palaeoerirhinus ponomarenkoi; genus also contains new species P. latus, P. thompsoni and P. longirostris.	
Palaeometrioxena	Gen. et sp. nov	Junior synonym	Legalov	Eocene	Baltic amber	Europe (Baltic Sea region)	A belid. The type species is Palaeometrioxena zherikhini. Legalov (2019) considered the genus Palaeometrioxena to be a junior synonym of the genus Archimetrioxena, and transferred the species P zherikhini to the latter genus.	
Pareuryomma	Nom. et 2 sp. nov		Tan et al.	Early Cretaceous	Yixian Formation	China	A member of the family Ommatidae; a replacement name for Euryomma Tan et al. (2006). The type species is "Euryomma" tylodes Tan et al. (2006); genus also includes new species P. cardiobasis. Additional new species described by Tan et al., P. ancistrodonta from the Middle Jurassic Jiulongshan Formation, was subsequently transferred to the genus Omma by Kirejtshuk (2020).	
Pleocoma dolichophylla	Sp. nov	Valid	Nikolajev & Ren	Early Cretaceous	Yixian Formation	China	A rain beetle, a species of Pleocoma.	
Prosinodendron	Gen. et sp. nov	Valid	Bai, Ren, & Yang	Barremian to early Aptian	Yixian Formation	China	A stag beetle. The type species is Prosinodendron krelli.	
Prosolierius	Gen. et 3 sp. nov	Valid	Thayer, Newton, & Chatzimanolis	Barremian to Albian		Lebanon; Myanmar	A rove beetle.	
Pseudobrienia	Gen. et sp. nov	Valid	Legalov	Middle-Late Jurassic	Karabastau Formation	Kazakhstan	An obrieniid beetle. Its type species is Pseudobrienia rasnitsyni.	
Pseudoglaesotropis	Gen. et sp. nov	Valid	Legalov	Eocene	Baltic amber	Europe (Baltic Sea region)	An anthribid beetle. The type species is Pseudoglaesotropis martynovi. Legalov (2019) subsequently changed the rank of the genus Pseudoglaesotropis to the subgenus of the genus Glaesotropis, and transferred the species P. martynovi to the latter genus.	
Pulcherhybosorus	Gen. et sp. nov	Valid	Yan, Bai & Ren	Early Cretaceous	Yixian Formation	China	A hybosorid beetle. The type species is Pulcherhybosorus tridentatus.	
Rhyzobius antiquus	Sp. nov	Valid	Kirejtshuk & Nel	Earliest Eocene	Oise amber	France	A cocciduline coccinellid beetle, a species of Rhyzobius	
Rhyzobius gratiosus	Sp. nov	Valid	Kirejtshuk & Nel	Earliest Eocene	Oise amber	France	A cocciduline coccinellid beetle, a species of Rhyzobius	
Septiventer	Gen. et sp. nov	Valid	Bai et al.	Late Jurassic or Early Cretaceous	Yixian Formation	China	A septiventerid scarabaeoid beetle. The type species is Septiventer quadridentatus.	
Shartegopsis	Gen. et sp. nov	Valid	Kirejtshuk	Late Jurassic		Mongolia	A clerid beetle. The type species is Shartegopsis miranda.	
Sinodromeus	Gen. et sp. nov	Valid	Wang, Zhang & Ponomarenko	Early Cretaceous	Yixian Formation	China	A trachypachid. The type species is Sinodromeus liutiaogouensis.	
Sinopeltis	Gen. et 2 sp. nov	Valid	Yu et al.	Middle Jurassic	Jiulongshan Formation	China	A peltine trogossitid beetle. Genus contains two species: S. jurrasica (type species) and S. amoena. Kirejtshuk (2017) considered the genus Sinopeltis to be a junior synonym of the genus Cervicatinius Tan & Ren (2007).	
Sinoschizala	Gen. et sp. nov	Valid	Jarzembowski et al.	Middle Jurassic	Daohugou Beds	China	A schizophorid beetle. The type species is Sinoschizala darani.	
Succinometrioxena	Gen. et sp. nov	Valid	Legalov	Eocene		Europe	A belid weevil found in Baltic amber. The type species is Succinometrioxena poinari.	
Sucinoptinus bukejsi	Sp. nov	Valid	Alekseev	Eocene (Priabonian)	Prussian Formation	Russia (Kaliningrad Oblast)	A spider beetle found in Baltic amber, a species of Sucinoptinus.	
Tafforeus	Gen. et sp. nov	Valid	Perreau	Eocene		Russia (Kaliningrad Oblast)	A leiodid beetle found in Baltic amber. The type species is Tafforeus cainosternus.	
Talbragarus	Gen. et sp. nov	Valid	Oberprieler & Oberprieler	Late Jurassic	Talbragar Fish Bed	Australia	A nemonychid weevil. The type species is Talbragarus averyi.	
Tetraphalerus decorosus	Sp. nov		Tan et al.	Middle Jurassic	Jiulongshan Formation	China	Originally described as a species of Tetraphalerus; Kirejtshuk (2020) transferred this species to the ommatine genus Monticupes.	
Toksunius	Gen. et comb. nov	Valid	Ponomarenko et al.	Late Triassic		China	A new genus for "Ademosynoides" chinaticus Lin (1992).	
Tomoderus balticus	Sp. nov	Valid	Telnov	Late Eocene		Latvia or Lithuania	A tomoderine anthicid beetle found in Baltic amber, a species of Tomoderus.	
Trixagus majusculus	sp nov	Valid	Kovalev, Kirejtshuk & Nel	Lowermost Eocene		France	A throscid beetle, a species of Trixagus.	
Unda chifengensis	sp nov	Valid	Wang, Zhang & Ponomarenko	Middle Jurassic	Daohugou Beds	China	A trachypachid, a species of Unda.	
Xenohimatium	Gen. et sp. nov	Valid	Lyubarsky & Perkovsky	Late Eocene	Rovno amber	Ukraine	A pleasing fungus beetle belonging to the subfamily Xenoscelinae. The type species is X. rovnense.	

== Diptera ==
Name	Novelty	Status	Authors	Age	Unit	Location	Notes	Images
Aetheapnomyia	Gen. et comb. nov	Valid	Harbach & Greenwalt	Eocene		Europe	A mosquito found in Baltic Amber, a new genus for "Aedes" hoffeinsorum Szadziewski 1998.	
Bibio anatolicus	Sp. nov	Valid	Skartveit & Nel	Oligocene		Turkey	A species of Bibio.	
Bibio nigricosta	Sp. nov	Valid	Skartveit & Nel	Oligocene		Turkey	A species of Bibio.	
Calosargus talbragarensis	Sp. nov	Valid	Oberprieler & Yeates	Late Jurassic		Australia	An archisargid brachyceran, a species of Calosargus.	
Clarumreddera	Gen. et 2 sp. nov	Valid	Fedotova & Perkovsky	Late Eocene	Rovno amber	Ukraine	A cecidomyiid fly, with two species: C. korneyevi and C. conceptiva.	
Culiseta kishenehn	Sp. nov	Valid	Harbach & Greenwalt	Eocene	Kishenehn Formation	United States	A mosquito, a species of Culiseta.	
Culiseta lemniscata	Sp. nov	Valid	Harbach & Greenwalt	Eocene	Kishenehn Formation	United States	A mosquito, a species of Culiseta.	
Curtonotum electrodominicum	Sp. nov	Valid	Grimaldi & Kirk-Spriggs	Miocene		Dominican Republic	A curtonotid found in Dominican amber, a species of Curtonotum.	
Daohugosargus	Gen. et comb. nov	Valid	Zhang	Middle Jurassic	Daohugou Beds	China	An archisargid brachyceran; a new genus for "Sharasargus" eximius Zhang, Yang & Ren (2008).	
Depressonotum	Gen. et sp. nov	Valid	Grimaldi & Kirk-Spriggs	Miocene		Dominican Republic	A curtonotid found in Dominican amber. The type species is Depressonotum priscum.	
Dicranomyia (Caenolimonia) alexbrowni	Sp. nov	Valid	Podenas & Poinar	Late Oligocene to early Miocene		Mexico	A species of Dicranomyia.	
Dicranomyia (Dicranomyia) chiapa	Sp. nov	Valid	Podenas & Poinar	Late Oligocene to early Miocene		Mexico	A species of Dicranomyia.	
Dicranomyia (Dicranomyia) mexa	Sp. nov	Valid	Podenas & Poinar	Late Oligocene to early Miocene		Mexico	A species of Dicranomyia.	
Dicranomyia (Dicranomyia) vella	Sp. nov	Valid	Podenas & Poinar	Late Oligocene to early Miocene		Mexico	A species of Dicranomyia.	
Didactylomyia dlusskyi	Sp. nov	Valid	Fedotova & Perkovsky	Late Eocene		Ukraine	A cecidomyiid fly found in Rovno amber, a species of Didactylomyia.	
Enischnomyia	Gen. et sp. nov	Valid	Poinar & Brown	Burdigalian	Dominican amber	Dominican Republic	A bat fly, type species E. stegosoma, host for the Plasmodiidae Vetufebrus ovatus	Enischnomyia stegosoma
Eoaedes	Gen. et comb. nov	Valid	Harbach & Greenwalt	Eocene		Europe	A mosquito found in Baltic Amber, a new genus for "Aedes" damzeni Szadziewski 1998.	
Eoptychopterina postica	Sp. nov	Disputed	Liu, Shih & Ren	Middle Jurassic	Jiulongshan Formation	China	A ptychopterid, a species of Eoptychopterina. Considered to be a junior synonym of Eoptychopterina elenae Ren & Krzemiński (2002) by Lukashevich & Ansorge (2026).	
Eotrichocera (Archaeotrichocera) spatiosa	Sp. nov	Valid	Liu, Shih & Ren	Middle Jurassic	Jiulongshan Formation	China	A trichocerid, a species of Eotrichocera.	
Erioptera (?Mesocyphona) beata	Sp. nov	Valid	Podenas & Poinar	Late Oligocene to early Miocene		Mexico	A species of Erioptera.	
Erioptera (Mesocyphona) diver	Sp. nov	Valid	Podenas & Poinar	Late Oligocene to early Miocene		Mexico	A species of Erioptera.	
Erioptera (?Mesocyphona) sherry	Sp. nov	Valid	Podenas & Poinar	Late Oligocene to early Miocene		Mexico	A species of Erioptera.	
Flagellisargus	Gen. et 3 sp. nov	Valid	Zhang	Callovian or Oxfordian	Daohugou Beds	China	An archisargid fly. Genus contains three species: Flagellisargus sinicus, F. venustus and F. robustus.	
Groveromyia	Gen. et 3 sp. et comb. nov	Valid	Fedotova & Perkovsky	Late Eocene	Rovno amber	Ukraine	A cecidomyiid fly with 4 species G. occlusa; G. digna, G. astrosa, and "Bryocrypta" concinna Fedotova (2005).	
Helius (Helius) collemus	Sp. nov	Valid	Podenas & Poinar	Late Oligocene to early Miocene		Mexico	A species of Helius.	
Jurochlus adustus	Sp. nov	Valid	Lukashevich & Przhiboro	Mesozoic		Mongolia	A chironomid, a species of Jurochlus.	
Jurochlus limbatus	Sp. nov	Valid	Lukashevich & Przhiboro	Mesozoic		Mongolia	A chironomid, a species of Jurochlus.	
Jurochlus lineatus	Sp. nov	Valid	Lukashevich & Przhiboro	Mesozoic		Mongolia	A chironomid, a species of Jurochlus.	
Jurochlus trivittatus	Sp. nov	Valid	Lukashevich & Przhiboro	Mesozoic		Mongolia	A chironomid, a species of Jurochlus.	
Lacrimyza	Gen. et 2 sp. nov	Valid	Roháček	Eocene		Europe	An anthomyzid. Genus contains two species: L. lacrimosa and L. christelae.	
Laiyangitabanus	Gen. et sp. nov	Valid	Zhang	Early Cretaceous	Laiyang Formation	China	A horse-fly. The type species is Laiyangitabanus formosus.	
Lithorhagio	Gen. et sp. nov	Valid	Zhang & Li	Middle Jurassic or lowermost Upper Jurassic	Daohugou Beds	China	A rhagionid. The type species is Lithorhagio megalocephalus.	
Lygistorrhina caribbiana	Sp. nov	Valid	Grund	Miocene		Dominican Republic	A lygistorrhinid fungus gnat found in Dominican amber, a species of Lygistorrhina.	
Mesorhyphus handlirschi	Sp. nov	Valid	Lukashevich	Upper Jurassic		Mongolia	An anisopodid bibionomorph, a species of Mesorhyphus.	
Mesorhyphus hennigi	Sp. nov	Valid	Lukashevich	Upper Jurassic		Mongolia	An anisopodid bibionomorph, a species of Mesorhyphus.	
Mesosciophila sigmoidea	sp nov	Valid	Wang, Zhao & Ren	Middle Jurassic	Jiulongshan Formation	China	A mesosciophilid nematoceran, a species of Mesosciophila.	
Mesosolva zhangae	Nom. nov	Valid	Zhang	Middle Jurassic	Daohugou Beds	China	An archisargid brachyceran; a replacement name for Brevisolva daohugouensis Zhang et al. (2010).	
Nemopalpus inexpectatus	Sp. nov	Valid	Wagner in Wagner & Stuckenberg	Late Eocene	Baltic amber	Europe	A bruchomyiine psychodid fly. Originally described as a species of Nemopalpus, but subsequently transferred to the genus Palaeosycorax.	
Nemopalpus velteni	Sp. nov	Valid	Wagner in Wagner & Stuckenberg	Cretaceous (Albian)	Burmese amber	Myanmar	A bruchomyiine psychodid fly. Originally described as a species of Nemopalpus, but subsequently transferred to the genus Palaeoglaesum.	
Orientisargus	Gen. et sp. nov	Valid	Zhang	Latest Middle Jurassic or earliest Late Jurassic	Daohugou Beds	China	An orientisargid archisargoid brachyceran. The type species is Orientisargus illecebrosus.	
Oryctochlus brundini	Sp. nov	Valid	Lukashevich	Late Jurassic		Mongolia	A podonomine chironomid, as species of Oryctochlus	
Oryctochlus kaluginae	Sp. nov	Valid	Lukashevich	Late Jurassic		Mongolia	A podonomine chironomid, as species of Oryctochlus	
Palaeopoecilostola eocenica	Sp. nov	Valid	Kania & Krzemiński	Eocene		Europe	A limoniid found in Baltic amber, a species of Palaeopoecilostola.	
Paramesosciophilodes aequus	sp nov	Valid	Wang, Zhao & Ren	Middle Jurassic	Jiulongshan Formation	China	A mesosciophilid nematoceran, a species of Paramesosciophilodes.	
Penthetria beskonakensis	Sp. nov	Valid	Skartveit & Nel	Oligocene		Turkey	A species of Penthetria.	
Probittacomorpha brisaci	sp nov	Valid	Krzemiński, Kania & Nel	Late Miocene		France	A ptychopterid, a species of Probittacomorpha.	
Procramptonomyia kovalevi	Sp. nov	Valid	Lukashevich	Upper Jurassic		Kazakhstan; Mongolia	A procramptonomyiid bibionomorph, a species of Procramptonomyia.	
Procramptonomyia ponomarenkoi	Sp. nov	Valid	Lukashevich	Upper Jurassic		Mongolia	A procramptonomyiid bibionomorph, a species of Procramptonomyia.	
Protanthomyza hennigi	Sp. nov	Valid	Roháček	Eocene		Europe	An anthomyzid, a species of Protanthomyza.	
Protanthomyza hoffeinsorum	Sp. nov	Valid	Roháček	Eocene		Europe	An anthomyzid, a species of Protanthomyza.	
Protanthomyza krylovi	Sp. nov	Valid	Roháček	Eocene		Europe	An anthomyzid, a species of Protanthomyza.	
Protanthomyza loewi	Sp. nov	Valid	Roháček	Eocene		Europe	An anthomyzid, a species of Protanthomyza.	
Protanthomyza meunieri	Sp. nov	Valid	Roháček	Eocene		Europe	An anthomyzid, a species of Protanthomyza.	
Protanthomyza presli	Sp. nov	Valid	Roháček	Eocene		Europe	An anthomyzid, a species of Protanthomyza.	
Protanthomyza tschirnhausi	Sp. nov	Valid	Roháček	Eocene		Europe	An anthomyzid, a species of Protanthomyza.	
Protoculicoides ciliatus	Sp. nov	Valid	Borkent	Cretaceous	Canadian amber	Canada	A member of the family Ceratopogonidae. Originally described as a species of Protoculicoides; Borkent (2019) transferred this species to the genus Atriculicoides.	
Protorhagio parvus	sp nov	Valid	Zhang & Li	Middle Jurassic or lowermost Upper Jurassic	Daohugou Beds	China	A rhagionid, a species of Protorhagio.	
Protorhyphus rohdendorfi	Sp. nov	Valid	Lukashevich	Upper Jurassic		Mongolia	A protorhyphid bibionomorph, a species of Protorhyphus.	
Rovnodidactylomyia	Gen. et 3 sp. et comb. nov	Valid	Fedotova & Perkovsky	Late Eocene		Europe	A cecidomyiid fly with 5 species R. zosimovichi, R. sidorenkoi, R. iconica) in Rovno amber, plus "Bryocrypta" girafa Meunier (1904) and "B." capitosa Meunier (1904) in Baltic amber.	
Sinallomyia	Nom. nov	Valid	Zhang	Early Cretaceous	Yixian Formation	China	An archisargid brachyceran; a replacement name for Allomyia Ren (1998).	
Sinocretomyia	Gen. et sp. nov	Valid	Zhang	Early Cretaceous	Laiyang Formation	China	An athericid. The type species is Sinocretomyia minuscula.	
Stilobezzia pikei	Sp. nov	Valid	Borkent	Cretaceous	Canadian amber	Canada	A species of Stilobezzia.	
Stomatosema iljieteugeniae	Sp. nov	Valid	Fedotova & Perkovsky	Late Eocene	Rovno amber	Ukraine	A cecidomyiid fly	
Tipula paleopannonia	Sp. nov	Valid	Engel & Gross	Miocene (ca. 11.3 Ma)	Paldau Formation	Austria	A crane fly, a species of Tipula.	

== Ephemeroptera ==
Name	Novelty	Status	Authors	Age	Unit	Location	Notes	Images
Alexandrinia	Gen. et sp.	Valid	Sinitshenkova & Vassilenko	Permian	Poldarsa Formation	Russia; United States	A mayfly. Species are A. gigantea and A. directum.	
Hammephemera	Gen. et sp. nov	Valid	Sinitshenkova in Bashkuev et al.	Early Triassic		Germany	A sharephemerid mayfly. The type species is Hammephemera pulchra.	
Misthodotes tshernovae	sp nov	Valid	Sinitshenkova & Vassilenko	Upper Permian	Poldarsa Formation	Russia	A mayfly, a species of Misthodotes.	
Ponalex	Gen. et sp. nov	Valid	Sinitshenkova & Aristov	Late Permian	Poldarsa Formation	Russia	A protereismatid mayfly. The type species is Ponalex maximus.	
Siphloplecton barabani	Sp. nov	Valid	Staniczek & Godunko	Eocene		Europe	A metretopodid mayfly found in Baltic amber, a species of Siphloplecton.	
Siphloplecton demoulini	Sp. nov	Valid	Staniczek & Godunko	Eocene		Europe	A metretopodid mayfly found in Baltic amber, a species of Siphloplecton.	
Siphloplecton hageni	Sp. nov	Valid	Staniczek & Godunko	Eocene		Europe	A metretopodid mayfly found in Baltic amber, a species of Siphloplecton.	
Siphloplecton picteti	Sp. nov	Valid	Staniczek & Godunko	Eocene		Europe	A metretopodid mayfly found in Baltic amber, a species of Siphloplecton.	

== Hemiptera ==
Name	Novelty	Status	Authors	Age	Unit	Location	Notes	Images
Acaricoris robertae	Sp. nov	Valid	Heiss & Poinar	Miocene		Dominican Republic	An aradid found in Dominican amber, a species of Acaricoris.	
Arctorthezia baltica	Sp. nov	Valid	Vea & Grimaldi	Eocene		Europe	An ortheziid found in Eocene Baltic amber, a species of Arctorthezia.	
Breviscutum	Gen. et sp. nov	Valid	Yao et al.	Cretaceous		China	A primipentatomid pentatomoid. The type species is Breviscutum lunatum.	
Burmacicada	Gen. et sp. nov	Valid	Poinar & Kritsky	Cretaceous	Burmese amber	Myanmar	A cicada. The type species is Burmacicada protera.	
Burmorthezia	Gen et 2 sp. nov	Valid	Vea & Grimaldi	Cretaceous (98 Ma)	Burmese amber	Myanmar	An ortheziid. Genus contains two species: Burmorthezia kotejai and B. insolita.	
Carventus bechlyi	Sp. nov	Valid	Heiss & Poinar	Miocene		Dominican Republic	An aradid found in Dominican amber, a species of Carventus.	
Cicadocoris varians	Sp. nov	Disputed	Dong, Yao & Ren	Middle Jurassic	Jiulongshan Formation	China	A moss bug belonging to the family Progonocimicidae. Jiang & Huang (2017) considered this species to be a probable junior synonym of Cicadocoris sinensis Hong (1983).	
Cinemala	Gen. et sp. nov	Valid	Shcherbakov	Middle or Late Jurassic	Bakhar Group	Mongolia	A member of Cicadomorpha belonging to the family Hylicellidae. The type species is C. contrasta.	
Cintux	Gen. et sp. nov	Valid	Stroiński & Szwedo	Palaeocene		France	A lophopid planthopper. The type species is Cintux menatensis.	
Conjucella	Gen. et sp. nov	Valid	Shcherbakov	Early Cretaceous	Zaza Formation	Russia	A member of Cicadomorpha belonging to the family Hylicellidae. The type species is C. selene.	
Dellashara	Gen. et sp. nov	Valid	Shcherbakov	Late Jurassic	Shar Teg Sequence	Mongolia	A member of Cicadomorpha belonging to the superfamily Membracoidea and the family Archijassidae. The type species is D. tega.	
Dominicicada	Gen. et sp. nov	Valid	Poinar & Kritsky			Dominican Republic	A cicada found in Dominican amber. The type species is Dominicicada youngi.	
Edessa protera	Sp. nov	Valid	Poinar & Thomas	Tertiary		Mexico	A pentatomid stink bug found in Mexican amber, a species of Edessa.	
Hispanocader	Gen. et sp. nov	Valid	Golub, Popov & Arillo	Albian	Escucha Formation	Spain	A relative of tingids. The type species is Hispanocader lisae.	
Hoffeinsoria	Gen. et sp. nov	Valid	Herczek & Popov	Eocene	Prussian Formation	Europe	An isometopine mirid found in Eocene Baltic amber. The type species is Hoffeinsoria robusta.	
Jiania	Gen. et 2 sp. nov	Valid	Wang & Szwedo in Wang, Szwedo & Zhang	Middle Jurassic	Daohugou Beds	China	A sinoalid froghopper. Genus contains two species: Jiania crebra and Jiania gracila. Fu, Cai & Huang (2018) considered J. gracila to be a junior synonym of J crebra.	
Kachinocoris	Gen. et sp. nov	Valid	Heiss	Cretaceous	Burmese amber	Myanmar	A flat bug found in Cretaceous Burmese Amber. The type species is Kachinocoris brevipennis.	
Kemobius	Gen. et sp. nov	Valid	Shcherbakov	Middle Jurassic	Itat Formation	Russia	A member of Cicadomorpha belonging to the superfamily Membracoidea and the family Archijassidae. The type species is K. lux.	
Kisa	Gen. et sp. nov	Valid	Shcherbakov	Middle Jurassic	Itat Formation	Russia	A member of Cicadomorpha belonging to the superfamily Membracoidea and the family Archijassidae. The type species is K. fasciata.	
Kubecola	Gen. et sp. nov	Valid	Shcherbakov	Middle Jurassic	Itat Formation	Russia	A member of Cicadomorpha belonging to the superfamily Membracoidea and the family Archijassidae. The type species is K. guttatus.	
Microaradus	Gen. et sp. nov	Valid	Heiss & Poinar	Mesozoic	Burmese amber	Myanmar	An archaearadine aradid found in Mesozoic Burmese amber. The type species is Microaradus anticus.	
Minyscapheus	Gen. et sp. nov.	Valid	Poinar, Kritsky & Brown			Dominican Republic	A cicada found in Dominican amber. The type species is Minyscapheus dominicanus.	
Mixorthezia dominicana	Sp. nov	Valid	Vea & Grimaldi	Miocene		Dominican Republic	An ortheziid found in Miocene Dominican amber, a species of Mixorthezia.	
Mixorthezia kozari	Sp. nov	Valid	Vea & Grimaldi	Miocene		Dominican Republic	An ortheziid found in Miocene Dominican amber, a species of Mixorthezia.	
Mongolocoris	Gen. et comb. nov	Valid	Ryzhkova	Early Cretaceous		Mongolia	An enicocorid leptopodomorph heteropteran, a new genus for "Enicocoris" tibialis Popov, 1986.	
Myanmezira	Gen. et sp. nov	Valid	Heiss & Poinar	Mesozoic	Burmese amber	Myanmar	A mezirine aradid found in Mesozoic Burmese amber. The type species is Myanmezira longicornis.	
Nesoproxius latocanus	Sp. nov	Valid	Heiss & Poinar	Miocene		Dominican Republic	An aradid found in Dominican amber, a species of Nesoproxius.	
Notonecta vetula	sp nov	Valid	Zhang, Yao & Ren	Late Jurassic	Chijinqiao Formation	China	A notonectid,a species of Notonecta.	
Oropentatoma	Gen. et sp. nov	Valid	Yao et al.	Cretaceous		China	A primipentatomid pentatomoid. The type species is Oropentatoma epichara.	
Poljanka hirsuta	sp nov	Valid	Yang, Yao & Ren	Middle Jurassic	Jiulongshan Formation	China	A member of Sternorrhyncha, a protopsyllidiid. Originally described as a species of Poljanka, but subsequently transferred to the genus Cicadellopsis.	
Primipentatoma	Gen. et 2 sp. nov	Valid	Yao et al.	Cretaceous		China	A primipentatomid pentatomoid. Genus contains two species: Primipentatoma peregrina and Primipentatoma fangi.	
Proneoproxius	Gen. et sp. nov	Valid	Heiss & Poinar	Miocene		Dominican Republic	An aradid found in Dominican amber. The type species is Proneoproxius cornutus.	
Purbecellus	Gen. et comb. nov	Valid	Shcherbakov	Early Cretaceous	Purbeck Group	United Kingdom	A member of Cicadomorpha belonging to the superfamily Membracoidea and the family Archijassidae. The type species is "Cicadellium" psocus Westwood (1854).	
Quadrocoris	Gen. et sp. nov	Valid	Yao et al.	Cretaceous		China	A primipentatomid pentatomoid. The type species is Quadrocoris radius.	
Sinaldocader rasnitsyni	Sp. nov	Valid	Golub & Popov	Turonian		Kazakhstan	A lace bug. Originally described as a species of Sinaldocader; Popov & Golub (2019) transferred this species to the separate genus Kzylcader.	
Sinoala	Gen. et sp. nov	Valid	Wang & Szwedo in Wang, Szwedo & Zhang	Middle Jurassic	Daohugou Beds	China	A sinoalid froghopper. The type species is Sinoala parallelivena.	
Sunotettigarcta hirsuta	sp nov	Valid	Li, Wang & Ren in Li et al.	Middle Jurassic	Daohugou Beds	China	A tettigarctid, a species of Sunotettigarcta.	
Ulanocoris	Gen. et 2 sp. nov	Valid	Ryzhkova	Early Cretaceous		Mongolia	An enicocorid leptopodomorph heteropteran. Genus contains two species: Ulanocoris femoralis and U. grandis.	
Venustsalda	Gen. et sp. nov	Valid	Zhang et al.	Lower Cretaceous	Yixian Formation	China	A saldid heteropteran. The type species is Venustsalda locella.	

== Hymenoptera ==
Name	Novelty	Status	Authors	Age	Unit	Location	Notes	Images
Agapia	Gen. et sp. nov	Valid	Kopylov	Late Cretaceous		Russia	An ichneumonid. The type species is Agapia sukatchevae.	
Agapteron	Gen. et sp. nov	Valid	Kopylov	Late Cretaceous		Russia	An ichneumonid. The type species is Agapteron popovi.	
Archimyrmex wedmannae	Sp. nov	Valid	Dlussky	Middle Eocene	Messel Pit	Germany	A myrmeciine ant.	Archimyrmex wedmannae
Anthophorula (Anthophorula) persephone	Sp. nov	Valid	Engel in Engel et al.	Early Miocene		Dominican Republic	An exomalopsine apid bee found in Dominican amber, a species of Anthophorula.	
Atefia	Gen. et sp. nov	Valid	Krogmann et al.	Early Cretaceous	Crato Formation	Brazil	A tenthredinoid hymenopteran sharing morphological characters with the families Pergidae and Diprionidae. The type species is Atefia rasnitsyni.	
Boltonidris	Gen. et sp. nov	Valid	Radchenko & Dlussky	Late Eocene	Rovno amber	Ukraine	A stenammine myrmicine ant found in Rovno amber. The type species is Boltonidris mirabilis.	
Bombus (Bombus) randeckensis	Sp. nov	Valid	Wappler & Engel in Wappler et al.	Miocene		Germany	A bumblebee.	
Casaleia eocenica	Sp nov	valid	Dlussky & Wedmann	Lutetian	Messel Formation	Germany	An amblyoponine ant.	Casaleia eocenica
Cascoscelio	Gen. et sp. nov.	Valid	Poinar in Poinar & Buckley	Early Cretaceous	Burmese amber	Myanmar	A platygastrid wasp, type species is C. incassus.	Cascoscelio incassa
Cephalopone	Gen. et 2 sp. nov	Valid	Dlussky & Wedmann	Eocene	Messel pit	Germany	A poneromorph ant. Two species: C. potens & C. grandis.	Cephalopone grandis
Cratoenigma	Gen. et sp. nov	Valid	Krogmann & Nél	Early Cretaceous (Aptian)	Crato Formation	Brazil	A probable relative of xiphydriids and euhymenopterans. The type species is C. articulata.	
Cretevania soplaensis	Sp. nov	Valid	De La Fuente, Peñalver & Ortega-Blanco	Albian		Spain	An evaniid, a species of Cretevania.	
Cretorhyssalus	Gen. et sp. nov	Valid	Belokobylskij	Cenomanian	Ola Formation	Russia	A braconid wasp. Type species is Cretorhyssalus brevis.	
Cyrtopone	Gen. et 4 sp. nov	Valid	Dlussky & Wedmann	Eocene	Messel Formation	Germany	A ponerinae ant. Genus contains four species: Cyrtopone curiosa, C. elongata, C. microcephala and C. striata.	C. striata
Gulgonga	Gen. et sp. nov	Valid	Oberprieler, Rasnitsyn & Brothers	Late Jurassic	Talbragar Fish Bed	Australia	A praeaulacid evanioid. The type species is Gulgonga beattiei.	
Haidomyrmex scimitarus	Sp. nov	Valid	Barden & Grimaldi	Late Aptian to Early Cenomanian	Burmese amber	Myanmar	A Sphecomyrmin ant	Haidomyrmex scimitarus
Haidomyrmex zigrasi	Sp. nov	Valid	Barden & Grimaldi	Campanian	Burmese amber	Myanmar	A Sphecomyrmin ant	Haidomyrmex zigrasi
Hyptia deansi	Sp. nov	Valid	Jennings, Krogmann & Mew	Late Oligocene or early Miocene		Mexico	An evaniid hymenopteran, a species of Hyptia.	
Ibalia (Ibalia) electra	Sp. nov	Valid	Engel & Liu	Eocene		Europe	An ibaliid found in Baltic amber, a species of Ibalia.	
Lancepyris	Gen. et sp. nov	Valid	Azevedo & Azar	Early Cretaceous		Lebanon	A lancepyrine bethylid found in Early Cretaceous Lebanese amber. The type species is Lancepyris opertus.	
Lonchodryinus balticus	Sp. nov	Valid	Olmi & Guglielmino	Late Eocene		Europe	A dryinid found in Baltic amber, a species of Lonchodryinus.	
Magadanobracon	Gen. et 2 sp. nov	Valid	Belokobylskij	Cenomanian	Ola Formation	Russia	A braconid wasp. The type species is M. rasnitsyni; a second species is M. zherikhini.	
Messelepone	Gen. et sp. nov	Valid	Dlussky & Wedmann	Eocene	Messel pit	Germany	A poneromorph ant. The type species is M. leptogenoides.	Messelepone leptogenoides
Mirabythus	Gen. et 2 sp. nov	Valid	Cai, Shih & Ren in Cai et al.	Early Cretaceous	Yixian Formation	China	A scolebythid chrysidoid. The genus contains two species: Mirabythus lechrius and M. liae.	
Pachycondyla eocenica	Sp. nov	Valid	Dlussky & Wedmann	Eocene	Messel pit	Germany	A Ponerinae ant.	Pachycondyla eocenica
Pachycondyla lutzi	Sp. nov	Valid	Dlussky & Wedmann	Eocene	Messel pit	Germany	A ponerine ant	Pachycondyla lutzi
Pachycondyla? messeliana	Sp. nov	Valid	Dlussky & Wedmann	Eocene	Messel pit	Germany	A ponerine ant.	Pachycondyla? messeliana
Pachycondyla minuta	Sp. nov	synonym	Dlussky & Wedmann	Eocene	Messel pit	Germany	A ponerine ant, name occupied, renamed P. parvula.	Pachycondyla parvula
Pachycondyla petiolosa	Sp. nov	Valid	Dlussky & Wedmann	Eocene	Messel pit	Germany	A ponerine ant.	Pachycondyla petiolosa
Pachycondyla petrosa	Sp. nov	Valid	Dlussky & Wedmann	Eocene	Messel pit	Germany	A poneromorph ant, a species of Pachycondyla.	Pachycondyla petrosa
Platyxyela	Gen. et sp. nov	Valid	Wang, Shih & Ren	Middle Jurassic	Jiulongshan Formation	China	A macroxyeline xyelid sawfly. The type species is Platyxyela unica.	
Praeichneumon dzhidensis	sp nov	Valid	Kopylov	Lower Cretaceous		Russia	A praeichneumonid ichneumonoid, a species of Praeichneumon.	
Praeichneumon khamardabanicus	sp nov	Valid	Kopylov	Lower Cretaceous		Russia	A praeichneumonid ichneumonoid, a species of Praeichneumon.	
Praeichneumon zakhaaminicus	sp nov	Valid	Kopylov	Lower Cretaceous		Russia	A praeichneumonid ichneumonoid, a species of Praeichneumon.	
Prionomyrmex wappleri	Sp. nov	Valid	Dlussky	Late Oligocene		Germany	A myrmeciine ant.	Prionomyrmex wappleri
Protodryinus	Gen. et sp. nov	Valid	Olmi & Guglielmino	Late Eocene		Europe	A dryinid found in Baltic amber. The type species is Protodryinus eocenicus.	
Protopone? dubia	Sp. nov	Valid	Dlussky & Wedmann	Eocene	Messel Formation	Germany	A ponerine ant	Protopone? dubia
Protopone germanica	Sp. nov	Valid	Dlussky & Wedmann	Eocene	Messel pit	Germany	A ponerine ant	Protopone germanica
Protopone magna	Sp. nov	Valid	Dlussky & Wedmann	Eocene	Messel pit	Germany	A ponerine ant	Protopone magna
Protopone oculata	Sp. nov	Valid	Dlussky & Wedmann	Eocene	Messel pit	Germany	A ponerine ant	Protopone oculata
Protopone sepulta	Sp. nov	Valid	Dlussky & Wedmann	Eocene	Messel pit	Germany	A ponerine ant	Protopone sepulta
Protopone vetula	Sp. nov	Valid	Dlussky & Wedmann	Eocene	Messel pit	Germany	A ponerine ant	Protopone vetula
Pseudectatomma	Gen. et 2 sp. nov	Valid	Dlussky & Wedmann	Eocene	Messel pit	Germany	An Ectatommin ant. Two species: P. eocenica and P. striatula.	Pseudectatomma eocenica
Trichelyon	Gen. et sp. nov	Disputed	Ortega-Blanco & Engel in Ortega-Blanco, Singh & Engel	Early Eocene (Ypresian)		India	A rhysipoline exothecine braconid wasp found in Cambay amber. The type species is Trichelyon tadkeshwarense. Belokobylskij & Manukyan (2024) considered Trichelyon to be a junior synonym of the genus Clinocentrus, though the authors maintained T. tadkeshwarense as a distinct species within the latter genus, resulting in a new combination Clinocentrus tadkeshwarense.	
Urotryphon baikurensis	Sp. nov	Valid	Kopylov	Late Cretaceous		Russia	An ichneumonid, a species of Urotryphon.	
Zatania electra	Sp. nov	Valid	Lapolla, Kallal & Brady	Eocene or Miocene	Dominican amber	Dominican Republic	A formicine ant, a species of Zatania.	Zatania electra

== Mecoptera ==
Name	Novelty	Status	Authors	Age	Unit	Location	Notes	Images
Baltipanorpa	Gen. et sp. nov	Valid	Krzemiński & Soszyńska-Maj	Middle Eocene	Baltic amber	Poland	A panorpid scorpionfly. The type species is B. damzeni.	
Exilibittacus	Gen. et sp. nov	Valid	Yang, Ren & Shih	Middle Jurassic	Jiulongshan Formation	China	A bittacid hangingfly. The type species is E. lii.	Exilibittacus lii
Jeholopsyche bella	Sp. nov	Valid	Qiao, Shih & Ren	Early Cretaceous	Yixian Formation	China	An aneuretopsychid mecopteran.	
Jeholopsyche completa	Sp. nov	Valid	Qiao, Shih & Ren	Early Cretaceous	Yixian Formation	China	An aneuretopsychid mecopteran.	
Jeholopsyche maxima	Sp. nov	Valid	Qiao, Shih & Ren	Early Cretaceous	Yixian Formation	China	An aneuretopsychid mecopteran.	
Juracimbrophlebia	Gen. et sp. nov	Valid	Wang, Labandeira, Shih & Ren in Wang et al.	Middle Jurassic (Bathonian or Callovian)	Jiulongshan Formation	China	A cimbrophlebiid mecopteran. Adults with Yimaia ginkglaean leaf mimicry. The type species is J. ginkgofolia.	Juracimbrophlebia ginkgofolia
Megabittacus spatiosus	Sp. nov	Valid	Yang, Ren & Shih	Late Jurassic or Early Cretaceous	Yixian Formation	China	A hangingfly, a species of Megabittacus.	
Orthophlebia nervulosa	sp nov	Valid	Qiao, Shih & Ren	Middle Jurassic	Jiulongshan Formation	China	A mecopteran, a species of Orthophlebia.	
Orthophlebia riccardii	Sp. nov	Valid	Petrulevičius & Ren	Middle Jurassic	Jiulongshan Formation	China	A mecopteran. Originally described as a species of Orthophlebia, subsequently transferred to the separate genus Gigaphlebia.	
Orthophlebia stigmosa	sp nov	Valid	Qiao, Shih & Ren	Middle Jurassic	Jiulongshan Formation	China	A mecopteran. Originally described as a species of Orthophlebia, subsequently transferred to the separate genus Longiphlebia.	
Perfecticimbrophlebia	Gen. et sp. nov	Valid	Yang, Shih & Ren in Yang et al.	Middle Jurassic	Jiulongshan Formation	China	A cimbrophlebiid mecopteran. The type species is Perfecticimbrophlebia laetus.	
Preanabittacus validus	sp nov	Valid	Yang, Shih & Ren in Yang et al.	Middle Jurassic	Jiulongshan Formation	China	A hangingfly, a species of Preanabittacus.	

== Neuroptera ==
Name	Novelty	Status	Authors	Age	Unit	Location	Notes	Images
Alloepipsychopsis	Gen. et sp. nov	Valid	Makarkin, Yang, et al.	Barremian	Yixian Formation	China	A psychopsid. Type species is Alloepipsychopsis lata.	
Chorilingia	Gen. et 4 sp. nov	Valid	Shi et al.	Middle Jurassic	Jiulongshan Formation	China	A grammolingiid neuropteran. Genus contains four species: of C. euryptera, C. parvica, C. translucida and C. peregrina.	
Guyiling	Gen. et sp. nov	Valid	Shi et al.	Early Cretaceous	Yixian Formation	China	A member of Myrmeleontiformia of uncertain phylogenetic placement. The type species is G. jianboni.	
Hallucinochrysa	Gen. et sp. nov	Valid	Pérez-de la Fuente, Delclòs, Peñalver & Engel in Pérez-de la Fuente et al.	Early Cretaceous (Albian)		Spain	A chrysopoid neuropteran (a relative of the green lacewings). The type species is Hallucinochrysa diogenesi.	
Kareninoides	Gen. et sp. et comb. nov	Valid	Yang, Makarkin & Ren	Early Cretaceous	La Huerguina Formation; Yixian Formation	China; Spain	A mesochrysopid neuropteran. The type species is Kareninoides lii; genus might also contain "Armandochrysopa" inexpecta Nel et al. (2005).	
Leptolingia oblonga	Sp. nov	Valid	Khramov	Late Jurassic		Mongolia	A grammolingiid neuropteran, a species of Leptolingia.	
Litholingia longa	Sp. nov	Valid	Khramov	Early or Middle Jurassic		Kyrgyzstan	A grammolingiid neuropteran, a species of Litholingia.	
Parakseneura	Gen. et 11 sp. nov	Valid	Yang, Makarkin & Ren in Yang et al.	Middle Jurassic	Jiulongshan Formation	China	A parakseneurid neuropteran. Genus contains 11 species.	
Protoaristenymphes daohugouensis	Sp. nov	Valid	Yang, Makarkin & Ren	Middle Jurassic	Daohugou Beds	China	A mesochrysopid neuropteran, a species of Protoaristenymphes.	
Protolingia	Gen. et sp. nov	Valid	Khramov	Early or Middle Jurassic		Kyrgyzstan	A grammolingiid neuropteran. The type species is Protolingia mira.	
Pseudorapisma	Gen. et 3 sp. nov	Valid	Yang, Makarkin & Ren in Yang et al.	Middle Jurassic	Jiulongshan Formation	China	A parakseneurid neuropteran. Genus contains 3 species: P. jurassicum, P. maculatum and P. angustipenne.	
Shuraboneura	Gen. et sp. nov	Valid	Khramov & Makarkin in Yang et al.	Early or Middle Jurassic	Sogul Formation	Kyrgyzstan	A parakseneurid neuropteran. The type species is Shuraboneura ovata.	

== Notoptera ==
Name	Novelty	Status	Authors	Age	Unit	Location	Notes	Images
Duoduo	Gen. et sp. nov	Junior synonym	Cui	Middle Jurassic	Daohugou Beds	China	A putative relative of grylloblattids. The type species is Duoduo qianae. Huang & Nel (2023) considered the genus Duoduo to be a junior synonym of the genus Plesioblattogryllus, while Cui et al. (2023) considered the species D. qianae to be a junior synonym of the species Plesioblattogryllus magnificus.	
Kitshuga	Gen. et sp. nov	Valid	Aristov	Upper Permian		Russia	A cacurgid grylloblattid. The type species is Kitshuga ryzhkovae.	
Oborella brauckmanni	sp nov	Valid	Prokop et al.	Early Permian	Meisenheim Formation	Germany	A euryptilonid grylloblattid, a species of Oborella.	
Oborella germanica	sp nov	Valid	Prokop et al.	Early Permian	Meisenheim Formation	Germany	A grylloblattid. Originally described as a species of Oborella, but subsequently transferred to the genus Pictoborella.	

== Odonatoptera ==
Name	Novelty	Status	Authors	Age	Unit	Location	Notes	Images
Austroprotolindenia	Gen. et sp. nov	Valid	Beattie & Nel	Late Jurassic	Talbragar Fossil Fish Bed	Australia	A dragonfly. The type species is Austroprotolindenia jurassica.	
Azaroneura	Gen. et sp. nov	Valid	Nel et al.	Permian (Kungurian)	Koshelevka Formation	Russia	A protozygopteran. The type species is A. permiana.	
Balticoagrion	Gen. et sp. nov	Valid	Bechly	Eocene		Europe	A damselfly found in Baltic amber. The type species is Balticoagrion paulyi.	
Decoraeshna	Gen. et sp. nov	Valid	Li et al.	Early Cretaceous	Yixian Formation	China	A progobiaeshnid dragonfly. The type species is Decoraeshna preciosus.	
Engellestes	Gen. et sp. nov	Valid	Nel et al.	Permian (Kungurian)	Koshelevka Formation	Russia	A protozygopteran. The type species is E. chekardensis.	
Epilestes angustapterix	Sp. nov	Valid	Nel et al.	Late Permian		Russia	A protozygopteran.	
Germanostenolestes	Gen. et sp. nov	Valid	Nel & Fleck	Middle Miocene		Germany	A sieblosiid epiproctophoran odonate. The type species is Germanostenolestes lutzi.	
Karatawia sinica	Sp. nov	Valid	Li, Nel & Ren in Li et al.	Middle Jurassic	Jiulongshan Formation	China	A campterophlebiid odonate,a species of Karatawia.	
Kennedya azari	Sp. nov	Valid	Nel et al.	Permian (Kungurian)	Koshelevka Formation	Russia	A protozygopteran.	
Kennedya ivensis	Sp. nov	Valid	Nel et al.	Late Permian		Russia	A protozygopteran.	
Kennedya pritykinae	Sp. nov	Valid	Nel et al.	Late Permian		Russia	A protozygopteran.	
Luiseia	Gen. et sp. nov	Valid	Nel et al.	Carboniferous/Permian boundary	Bursum Formation	United States	A protozygopteran. The type species is L. breviata.	
Mongoliaeshna exiguusens	Sp. nov	Valid	Li et al.	Early Cretaceous	Yixian Formation	China	A progobiaeshnid dragonfly, a species of Mongoliaeshna.	
Mongoliaeshna hadrens	Sp. nov	Valid	Li et al.	Early Cretaceous	Yixian Formation	China	A progobiaeshnid dragonfly, a species of Mongoliaeshna.	
Oligomazon	Gen. et comb. nov	Valid	Zessin & Brauckmann	Carboniferous (Pennsylvanian)		United States	A member of Meganisoptera, a paralogid; a new genus for "Oligotypus" makowskii Carpenter & Richardson (1971).	
Paragilsonia	Gen. et sp. nov (but see notes)	Valid	Zhang, Hong & Su in Su et al.	Carboniferous (Namurian)		China	A member of Odonatoptera; the type species is Paragilsonia orientalis. Li et al. (2013) synonymized Paragilsonia with the genus Tupus Sellards (1906); however, they retained P. orientalis as a distinct species within the latter genus.	
Paralogobora	Gen. et sp. nov	Valid	Zessin & Brauckmann	Early Permian		Czech Republic	A member of Odonata. The type species is Paralogobora guentherpetersi.	
Permolestes sheimogorai	Sp. nov	Valid	Nel et al.	Late Permian		Russia	A protozygopteran.	
Permolestes soyanaiensis	Sp. nov	Valid	Nel et al.	Late Permian		Russia	A protozygopteran.	
Progoneura grimaldii	Sp. nov	Valid	Nel et al.	Early Permian	Wellington Formation	United States	A protozygopteran.	
Pseudocymatophlebia boda	Sp. nov	Valid	Li, Nel & Ren in Li et al.	Early Cretaceous		China	An aktassiid odonate, a species of Pseudocymatophlebia.	
Sinierasiptera	Gen. et sp. nov (but see notes)	Valid	Zhang, Hong & Su in Su et al.	Carboniferous (Namurian)		China	A member of Odonatoptera; the type species is Sinierasiptera jini. Li et al. (2013) synonymized Sinierasiptera with the genus Erasipterella Brauckmann (1983); however, they retained S. jini as a distinct species within the latter genus.	
Sinojagoria cancellosa	Sp. nov	Valid	Li et al.	Early Cretaceous	Yixian Formation	China	A gomphaeschnid dragonfly, a species of Sinojagoria.	
Sinojagoria magna	Sp. nov	Valid	Li et al.	Early Cretaceous	Yixian Formation	China	A gomphaeschnid dragonfly, a species of Sinojagoria.	
Solikamptilon pectinatus	Sp. nov	Valid	Nel et al.	Late Permian		Russia	A protozygopteran.	

== Orthopterida ==
Name	Novelty	Status	Authors	Age	Unit	Location	Notes	Images
Archaboilus musicus	Sp. nov	Valid	Gu, Engel and Ren in Gu et al.	Bathonian to Callovian	Jiulongshan Formation	China	A haglid orthopteran.	
Eoerianthus	Gen. et sp. nov	Valid	Gorochov in Gorochov & Labandeira	Eocene; Bridgerian	Green River Formation; Lake Unita	United States; Colorado	A monkey grasshopper. The type species is E. eocaenicus.	
Eogryllus	Gen. et 2 sp. nov	Valid	Gorochov in Gorochov & Labandeira	Eocene	Green River Formation	United States	A Gryllini tribe grylline true cricket. The type species is E. unicolor Genus also tentatively includes E.? elongatus.	
Eomogoplistes	Gen. et sp. nov	Valid	Gorochov in Gorochov & Labandeira	Eocene; Bridgerian	Green River Formation; Lake Unita	United States; Colorado	A Mogoplistini tribe Mogoplistine scaly cricket. The type species is E. longipennis.	
Eotetrix	Gen. et sp. nov	Valid	Gorochov in Gorochov & Labandeira	Eocene; Bridgerian	Green River Formation; Lake Unita	United States; Colorado	A batrachideine pygmy grasshopper. The type species is E. unicornis.	
Eotrella	Gen. et sp. nov	Valid	Gorochov in Gorochov & Labandeira	Eocene; Bridgerian	Green River Formation; Lake Unita	United States; Colorado	A phalangopsine spider cricket The type species is E. mira.	
Eozacla	Gen. et 2 sp. nov	Valid	Gorochov in Gorochov & Labandeira	Eocene; Bridgerian	Green River Formation; Lake Unita	United States; Colorado	A phalangopsine spider cricket The type species is E. arachnomorpha Genus also includes E. problematica.	
Heterologus duyiwuer	Sp. nov	Valid	Béthoux, Gu & Ren	Late Carboniferous (Namurian)	Tupo Formation	China	An archaeorthopteran (stem-orthopteran), a species of Heterologus.	
Hirsutgerarus	Gen. et sp. nov	Valid	Zessin	Carboniferous (Stephanian)		Germany	A gerarid panorthopteran. The type species is Hirsutgerarus saxonicus.	
Liassophyllum caii	sp nov	Valid	Gu & Ren in Gu, Qiao, & Ren	Bathonian to Callovian	Jiulongshan Formation	China	A hagloid orthopteran, originally described as a haglid, but subsequently transferred to the family Tuphellidae; a species of Liassophyllum.	
Miamia maimai	Sp. nov	Valid	Béthoux et al.	Late Carboniferous (early Pennsylvanian)		China	A stem–orthopteran insect, a species of Miamia.	
Protogryllus (Protogryllus) lakshmi	Sp. nov	Valid	Pérez-de La Fuente et al.	Middle Jurassic	Kota Formation	India	A protogryllid grylloid ensiferan, a species of Protogryllus.	
Pteromogoplistes	Gen. et sp. nov	Valid	Gorochov in Gorochov & Labandeira	Eocene; Bridgerian	Green River Formation; Lake Unita	United States; Colorado	A Mogoplistini tribe Mogoplistine scaly cricket. The type species is P. grandis Genus tentatively also includes Pronemobius smithii (1890).	
Pterotriamescaptor? americanus	Sp. nov	Valid	Gorochov in Gorochov & Labandeira	Eocene; Bridgerian	Green River Formation; Lake Unita	United States; Colorado	A gryllotalpine mole cricket.	
Sunoptera	Gen. et sp. nov	Valid	Hong & Li	Middle Triassic	Tongchuan Formation	China	A sunopterid "protorthopteran". The type species is Sunoptera orientalis.	
Tettoraptor	Gen. et sp. nov	Valid	Gorochov in Gorochov & Labandeira	Eocene; Bridgerian	Green River Formation; Lake Unita	United States; Colorado	A Tettigoniid grasshopper of uncertain affiliations. The type species is T. maculatus.	

== Raphidioptera ==
Name	Novelty	Status	Authors	Age	Unit	Location	Notes	Images
Alavaraphidia	Gen et sp. nov	Valid	Pérez-de la Fuente et al.	Albian	Escucha Formation	Spain	A Mesoraphidiid snakefly. The sole species is A. imperterrita.	Alavaraphidia imperterrita
Amarantoraphidia	Gen et sp. nov	Valid	Pérez-de la Fuente et al.	Albian	Escucha Formation	Spain	A Mesoraphidiid snakefly. The sole species is A. ventolina.	Amarantoraphidia ventolina
Baissoptera? cretaceoelectra	Sp. nov	Valid	Pérez-de la Fuente et al.	Albian	Escucha Formation	Spain	A baissopterid snakefly.	
Necroraphidia	Gen. et sp.	Valid	Pérez-de la Fuente et al.	Albian	Las Peñosas Formation	Spain	A Mesoraphidiid snakefly. The only species is N. arcuata.	Necroraphidia arcuata
Styporaphidia? hispanica	sp. nov	Valid	Pérez-de la Fuente et al.	Albian	Escucha Formation	Spain	A Mesoraphidiid snakefly. The second species in Styporaphidia.	Styporaphidia? hispanica

== Other ==
Name	Novelty	Status	Authors	Age	Unit	Location	Notes	Images
Anebos	Gen. et sp. nov	Valid	Garwood et al.	Late Pennsylvanian	Assise de Montceau Formation	France	A polyneopteran insect nymph of uncertain affinities. The type species is Anebos phrixos.	Anebos phrixos
Bechala	Gen. et sp. nov	Valid	Ilger & Brauckmann	Late Carboniferous (Namurian)		Germany	A member of Odonatoptera, assigned to the new family Bechalidae. Originally interpreted as a megasecopteran. Type species is Bechala sommeri.	
Bruayaphis	Gen. et sp. nov	Valid	Nel, Szwedo & Roques in Nel et al.	Late Carboniferous (Bashkirian/Westphalian)		France	A member of Paraneoptera of uncertain phylogenetic placement. The type species is Bruayaphis oudardi.	
Cucullistriga	Gen. et sp. nov	Valid	Aristov & Rasnitsyn	Kungurian		Russia	A member of Grylloblattida/Eoblattida belonging to the family Idelinellidae; a relative of ice crawlers or cockroaches. Type species is Cucullistriga cucullata.	
Darekia sanguinea	Gen. et sp. nov	Valid	Prokop et al.	Late Carboniferous (Langsettian)	Upper Silesian Coal Basin	Poland	A member of Paoliida belonging to the family Paoliidae.	
Eochauliodes	Gen. et sp. nov	Valid	Liu et al.	Middle Jurassic (Bathonian-Callovian)	Jiulongshan Formation	China	A fishfly. The type species is Eochauliodes striolatus.	
Eospilopsyllus	Gen. et sp. nov	Valid	Beaucournu & Perrichot in Perrichot, Beaucournu & Velten	Early Miocene		Dominican Republic	A pulicid flea found in Dominican amber. The type species is Eospilopsyllus kobberti.	
Geinitzia aristovi	Sp. nov	Valid	Cui, Storozhenko & Ren	Middle Jurassic	Jiulongshan Formation	China	A geinitziid, a member of Polyneoptera/Gryllones belonging to the group Reculida; a species of Geinitzia.	
Gymnopollisthrips	Gen. et 2 sp. nov.	Valid	Peñalver, Nel & Nel in Peñalver et al.	Early Cretaceous		Spain	A melanthripid thrip. Genus contains two species: Gymnopollisthrips minor and G. maior.	
Lethe montana	Sp. nov	Valid	Miller, Miller & Ivie	Oligocene	Canyon Ferry Lagerstätte	United States	A buttefly, a species of Lethe	
Liadotaulius daohugouensis	Sp. nov	Valid	Wu & Huang	Middle Jurassic	Daohugou Beds	China	A caddisfly, a species of Liadotaulius.	
Netoxena	Nom. nov	Valid	Sohn in Sohn et al.	Early Cretaceous (late Aptian)	Crato Formation	Brazil	A lepidopteran, possibly a member of Eolepidopterigidae; a replacement name for Xena Martins-Neto (1999).	
Pseudopulex	Gen. et 2 sp. nov	Valid	Gao, Shih, & Ren in Gao et al.	Middle Jurassic to Early Cretaceous		China	A flea-like insect. The genus contains 2 species: P. jurassicus and P. magnus.	
Rasstriga	Gen. et sp. nov	Valid	Aristov & Rasnitsyn	Late Carboniferous (Desmoinesian)		United States	A member of Grylloblattida/Eoblattida probably belonging to the family Idelinellidae; a relative of ice crawlers or cockroaches. Its type species is Rasstriga americana.	
Scutistriga	Gen. et sp. nov	Valid	Aristov & Rasnitsyn	Kungurian		Russia	A member of Grylloblattida/Eoblattida belonging to the family Idelinellidae; a relative of ice crawlers or cockroaches. Its type species is Scutistriga scutata.	
Sharasialis	Gen. et sp. nov	Valid	Ponomarenko	Late Jurassic		Mongolia	An alderfly. The type species is Sharasialis fusiformis.	
Sinoprotodiplatys	Gen. et sp. nov	Valid	Nel et al.	Early Cretaceous	Yixian Formation	China	An earwig belonging to the family Protodiplatyidae. The type species is Sinoprotodiplatys zhangi.	
Strigulla	Gen. et comb. nov	Valid	Aristov & Rasnitsyn	Kungurian		Russia	A member of Grylloblattida/Eoblattida belonging to the family Idelinellidae; a relative of ice crawlers or cockroaches. A new genus for "Euryptilon" cuculiophoris (Aristov, 2002).	
Strudiella	Gen. et sp. nov.	Valid	Garrouste et al.	Late Devonian		Belgium	The first complete Late Devonian insect, probably terrestrial. The type species is Strudiella devonica.	
Zdenekia silesiensis	Sp. nov	Valid	Prokop et al.	Late Carboniferous (Langsettian)	Upper Silesian Coal Basin	Poland	A member of Paoliida belonging to the family Paoliidae.	

== General research ==
- The oldest member of the tiger moth subfamily Arctiinae is noted, but not described from the Klondike Mountain Formation.
