= Podonominae =

Scientific classification
- Kingdom: Animalia
- Phylum: Arthropoda
- Clade: Pancrustacea
- Class: Insecta
- Order: Diptera
- Family: Chironomidae
- Subfamily: Podonominae

Tribes
- See text

Subfamily of midges

Podonominae is a subfamily of midges in the non-biting midge family (Chironomidae).

== Tribes & genera ==
- Tribe Boreochlini Saether, 1981

- Genus Boreochlus Edwards, 1938
- Genus Lasiodiamesa Kieffer, 1924
- Genus Paraboreochlus Thienemann, 1939
- Genus Trichotanypus Kieffer, 1906

- Tribe Podonomini Kieffer, 1922

- Genus Parochlus Enderlein, 1912
