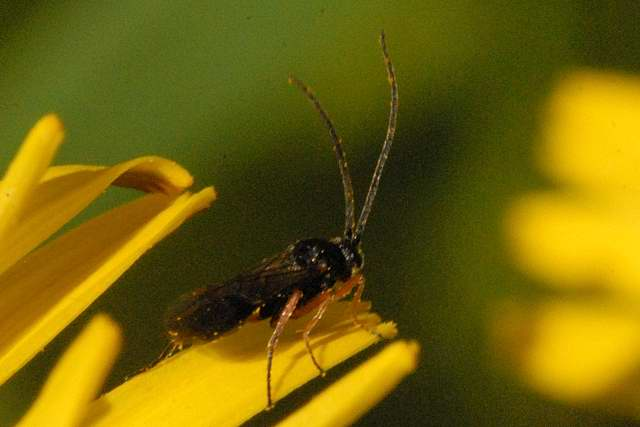
- A Shawiana catenator parasitoid wasp specimen

Scientific classification
- Kingdom: Animalia
- Phylum: Arthropoda
- Class: Insecta
- Order: Hymenoptera
- Family: Braconidae
- Subfamily: Exothecinae; Förster, 1863

Tribes
- Several, see text

= Exothecinae =

Subfamily of parasitoid wasps

The Exotheciane are a large subfamily of Braconidae parasitoid wasps.

== Genera ==
The following genera belong to Exotheciane.

- Afrorhysipolis
- Austrolysitermus
- Chremylus
- Colastes (including Shawiana)
- Colastinus
- Dimeris
- Eupambolus
- Gnaptodon
- Hormius
- Kerevata
- Notiopambolus
- Occipitotus
- Orientocolastes
- Palaeocolastes
- Pambolus
- Phaenodus
- Pilichremylus
- Plesiocedria
- Pseudophanomeris
- Spathiophaenodus
- Vietcolastes
- Xenarcha
