= Siphloplecton basale =

Scientific classification
- Domain: Eukaryota
- Kingdom: Animalia
- Phylum: Arthropoda
- Class: Insecta
- Order: Ephemeroptera
- Family: Metretopodidae
- Genus: Siphloplecton
- Species: S. basale

Binomial name
- Siphloplecton basale (Walker, 1853)

Synonyms
- Baetis basalis Walker, 1853; Siphloplecton flexus (Clemens, 1913); Siphloplecton signatum Traver, 1932; Siphlurus flexus Clemens, 1913

Species of mayfly

Siphloplecton basale is a species of cleftfooted minnow mayfly in the family Metretopodidae. It is found in all of Canada and the eastern United States.
