= Melizoderidae =

Scientific classification
- Domain: Eukaryota
- Kingdom: Animalia
- Phylum: Arthropoda
- Class: Insecta
- Order: Hemiptera
- Suborder: Auchenorrhyncha
- Superfamily: Membracoidea
- Family: Melizoderidae; Deitz and Dietrich, 1993

Genera
- Melizoderes; Llanquihuea

Family of tree-hoppers from South America

Melizoderidae is a family of treehoppers restricted to South America with only two genera, Melizoderes and Llanquihuea. The nymphs of melizoderids have the tergum of the 9th segment concealing the anal opening from above. The frontoclypeus (forehead) is convex and extended forward and below. The pronotum extends forward and above but not backward over the scutellum which is keeled posteriorly.
