= Kararhynchus =

Kararhynchus Temporal range: Oxfordian

Scientific classification
- Kingdom: Animalia
- Phylum: Arthropoda
- Class: Insecta
- Order: Coleoptera
- Family: †Obrieniidae
- Genus: †Kararhynchus; Zherikhin & Gratshev, 1994

Species
- K. gratshevi Legalov, 2012; K. jurassicus Legalov, 2012; K. occiduus Zherikhin & Gratshev, 1994 (type species)

Extinct genus of beetles

Kararhynchus is an extinct genus of beetles known from the middle Late Jurassic epoch of Kazakhstan. It was first described by Vladimir Zherikhin and Vadim Gratshev in 1994, who included in it a single species, Kararhynchus occiduus from the Karabastau Formation. Two further species, K. gratshevi and K. jurassicus, were described from the same formation by A. A. Legalov in 2012.
