= Melizoderes =

Scientific classification
- Domain: Eukaryota
- Kingdom: Animalia
- Phylum: Arthropoda
- Class: Insecta
- Order: Hemiptera
- Suborder: Auchenorrhyncha
- Family: Melizoderidae
- Genus: Melizoderes; Spinola, 1850

Genus of insects

Melizoderes is a genus of treehoppers belonging to the family Melizoderidae. It has 7 described species.

== Species ==
The following species are recognized in this genus:

- Melizoderes carinatus Blanchard, 1852
- Melizoderes darwini (Funkhouser, 1934)
- Melizoderes dentistylus Linnavuori & DeLong, 1979
- Melizoderes dohrnii Signoret, 1863
- Melizoderes gayi Spinola, 1852
- Melizoderes osborni (Funkhouser, 1930)
- Melizoderes variegatus (Funkhouser, 1930)
