= Catops geomysi =

Scientific classification
- Domain: Eukaryota
- Kingdom: Animalia
- Phylum: Arthropoda
- Class: Insecta
- Order: Coleoptera
- Suborder: Polyphaga
- Infraorder: Staphyliniformia
- Family: Leiodidae
- Genus: Catops
- Species: C. geomysi

Binomial name
- Catops geomysi Peck & Skelley, 2001

Species of beetle

Catops geomysi is a species of small carrion beetle in the family Leiodidae. It is found in North America.
