= Metretopus =

Scientific classification
- Domain: Eukaryota
- Kingdom: Animalia
- Phylum: Arthropoda
- Class: Insecta
- Order: Ephemeroptera
- Family: Metretopodidae
- Genus: Metretopus

Genus of insects

Metretopus is a genus of insects belonging to the family Metretopodidae.

The species of this genus are found in Europe, Russia and Northern America.

Species:

- Metretopus alter Bengtsson, 1930
- Metretopus borealis (Eaton, 1871)
