= Catops americanus =

Scientific classification
- Domain: Eukaryota
- Kingdom: Animalia
- Phylum: Arthropoda
- Class: Insecta
- Order: Coleoptera
- Suborder: Polyphaga
- Infraorder: Staphyliniformia
- Family: Leiodidae
- Genus: Catops
- Species: C. americanus

Binomial name
- Catops americanus Hatch, 1928

Species of beetle

Catops americanus is a species of small carrion beetle in the family Leiodidae. It is found in North America.
