= Catops alsiosus =

Scientific classification
- Kingdom: Animalia
- Phylum: Arthropoda
- Class: Insecta
- Order: Coleoptera
- Suborder: Polyphaga
- Infraorder: Staphyliniformia
- Family: Leiodidae
- Genus: Catops
- Species: C. alsiosus

Binomial name
- Catops alsiosus (Horn, 1885)

Species of beetle

Catops alsiosus is a species of small carrion beetle in the family Leiodidae. It is found in Europe and Northern Asia (excluding China) and North America.
