= Myerslopiidae =

Scientific classification
- Domain: Eukaryota
- Kingdom: Animalia
- Phylum: Arthropoda
- Class: Insecta
- Order: Hemiptera
- Suborder: Auchenorrhyncha
- Superfamily: Membracoidea
- Family: Myerslopiidae; Evans, 1957

Genera
- Myerslopia; Pemmation; Mapuchea

Family of true bugs

Myerslopiidae is a family of tree-hoppers which consist of about 20 species in three genera with a distribution limited to New Zealand and Chile. Adult hoppers have a strongly sclerotized body with elytra-like tegmina meeting along the median. The hindwing is undeveloped. Based on observations on Mapuchea chilensis, they are thought to feed on phloem sap. They were formerly mistakenly placed as a tribe within the Ulopinae (Cicadellidae) by Evans and then raised to subfamily rank before being moved to a different suborder.
