= Llanquihuea =

Scientific classification
- Domain: Eukaryota
- Kingdom: Animalia
- Phylum: Arthropoda
- Class: Insecta
- Order: Hemiptera
- Suborder: Auchenorrhyncha
- Family: Melizoderidae
- Genus: Llanquihuea; Linnavuori & DeLong, 1978
- Species: L. pilosa

Binomial name
- Llanquihuea pilosa Linnavuori & DeLong, 1978

Genus of insects

Llanquihuea is a genus of treehoppers belonging to the family Melizoderidae. It contains the single species Llanquihuea pilosa.
