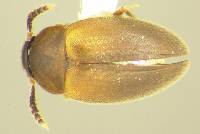

Scientific classification
- Kingdom: Animalia
- Phylum: Arthropoda
- Class: Insecta
- Order: Coleoptera
- Suborder: Polyphaga
- Infraorder: Staphyliniformia
- Family: Leiodidae
- Subfamily: Cholevinae
- Genus: Catops
- Species: C. basilaris

Binomial name
- Catops basilaris Say, 1823

= Catops basilaris =

Species of beetle

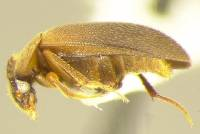
Lateral view

Catops basilaris is a species of small carrion beetle in the family Leiodidae. It is found in North America.
