= Hammephemera =

Scientific classification
- Kingdom: Animalia
- Phylum: Arthropoda
- Class: Insecta
- Order: Ephemeroptera
- Genus: †Hammephemera; Sinitshenkova in Bashkuev et al., 2012

Extinct genus of mayflies

Hammephemera is an extinct genus of mayflies which existed during the early Triassic in what is now Nepal. It was described by Nina Sinitshenkova in 2012, and the type species is H. pulchra. The forewings measure approximately 8.75 millimetres by 4.06 millimetres.
