= Cretorhyssalus =

Cretorhyssalus brevis Temporal range: Cenomanian

Scientific classification
- Domain: Eukaryota
- Kingdom: Animalia
- Phylum: Arthropoda
- Class: Insecta
- Order: Hymenoptera
- Family: Braconidae
- Genus: †Cretorhyssalus; Belokobylskij, 2012
- Species: †C. brevis

Binomial name
- †Cretorhyssalus brevis Belokobylskij, 2012

Extinct genus of wasps

Cretorhyssalus is an extinct genus of wasps which existed in what is now Russia during the Cenomanian age of the Late Cretaceous. It was described by Sergey A. Belokobylskij, and contains the species C. brevis.
