= Alloioscarabaeus =

Alloioscarabaeus Temporal range: Middle Jurassic

Scientific classification
- Domain: Eukaryota
- Kingdom: Animalia
- Phylum: Arthropoda
- Class: Insecta
- Order: Coleoptera
- Suborder: Polyphaga
- Infraorder: Scarabaeiformia
- Superfamily: Scarabaeoidea
- Family: †Alloioscarabaeidae; Bai, Ren & Yang, 2012
- Genus: †Alloioscarabaeus; Bai, Ren & Yang, 2012
- Species: †A. cheni

Binomial name
- †Alloioscarabaeus cheni Bai, Ren & Yang, 2012

Extinct genus of beetles

Alloioscarabaeus is an extinct genus of insect in the order Coleoptera in the clade Scarabaeoidea. It is the only known member of the family Alloioscarabaeidae, and the genus only has one species, Alloioscarbaeus cheni, from the middle Jurassic period, 164.7 million to 155.7 million years ago in Inner Mongolia, China.
