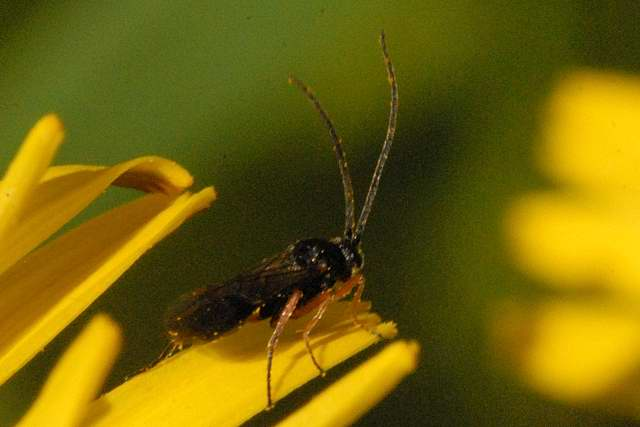
- Colastes (Shawiana) catenator

Scientific classification
- Kingdom: Animalia
- Phylum: Arthropoda
- Class: Insecta
- Order: Hymenoptera
- Family: Braconidae
- Genus: Colastes; Haliday, 1833

= Colastes =

Genus of wasps

Colastes is a genus of wasp in the family Braconidae. There are at least 80 described species in Colastes.

The genus Shawiana has been recently treated as a subgenus of Colastes.

== Species ==
The following 87 species belong to the genus Colastes:

- Colastes abdominalis Belokobylskij, 1986^{c g}
- Colastes abnormis (Wesmael, 1838)^{c g}
- Colastes abrogatus (Brues, 1910)^{c g}
- Colastes aciculatus Tobias, 1986^{c g}
- Colastes adjunctus Belokobylskij, 1998^{c g}
- Colastes affinis (Wesmael, 1838)^{c}
- Colastes alaskensis (Ashmead, 1902)^{c g}
- Colastes alboapicalis Belokobylskij, 1988^{c g}
- Colastes amoenus Belokobylskij, 2000^{c g}
- Colastes anervis Belokobylskij, 1992^{c g}
- Colastes anomalopterus (Spinola, 1851)^{c g}
- Colastes attonita (Papp, 1987)^{c g}
- Colastes avatsha Belokobylskij, 1998^{c g}
- Colastes baikalicus Belokobylskij, 1998^{c g}
- Colastes bohayicus Belokobylskij, 1996^{c g}
- Colastes borealis (Walley, 1936)^{c g}
- Colastes braconius Haliday, 1833^{c g}
- Colastes brevipetiolatus Tobias, 1986^{c g}
- Colastes catenator (Haliday, 1836)^{c g}
- Colastes cilipennis (Cameron, 1910)^{c g}
- Colastes cognatus Belokobylskij, 1992^{c g}
- Colastes colenutti (Cockerell, 1921)^{c g}
- Colastes cribellatus (Spinola, 1851)^{c g}
- Colastes curtifemur Zaykov & Basamakov, 1984^{c g}
- Colastes dersu Belokobylskij, 1998^{c g}
- Colastes distractus (Cockerell, 1921)^{c g}
- Colastes effectus (Papp, 1972)^{c g}
- Colastes elongatus Belokobylskij, 1998^{c g}
- Colastes flavitarsis (Thomson, 1892)^{c g}
- Colastes foveolator (Thomson, 1892)^{c g}
- Colastes fragilis (Haliday, 1836)^{c g}
- Colastes fritzeni van Achterberg & Shaw, 2008^{c g}
- Colastes grenadensis Ashmead, 1895^{c g}
- Colastes himalayicus Belokobylskij, 2000^{c g}
- Colastes hopkinsi (Ashmead, 1900)^{c}
- Colastes hungaricus (Szepligeti, 1906)^{c}
- Colastes incertus (Wesmael, 1838)^{c g}
- Colastes inopinatus Belokobylskij, 2000^{c g}
- Colastes insularis Belokobylskij, 1984^{c g}
- Colastes interdictus Belokobylskij, 1998^{c g}
- Colastes involutus Belokobylskij, 1992^{c g}
- Colastes ivani Belokobylskij, 1986^{c g}
- Colastes kiefferi (Nomine, 1938)^{c g}
- Colastes kurilensis Belokobylskij, 1996^{c g}
- Colastes laevis (Thomson, 1892)^{c g}
- Colastes lapponicus (Thomson, 1892)^{c g}
- Colastes laticarpus (Thomson, 1892)^{c g}
- Colastes longitergum Belokobylskij, 1988^{c g}
- Colastes luridiceps (Vachal, 1908)^{c g}
- Colastes lustrator (Haliday, 1836)^{c g}
- Colastes macropterus Belokobylskij, 1992^{c g}
- Colastes magdalenae Sterzynski, 1983^{c g}
- Colastes malayensis Belokobylskij, 1992^{c g}
- Colastes melanocephalus (Spinola, 1851)^{c g}
- Colastes mellipes (Provancher, 1880)^{c}
- Colastes mendax Belokobylskij, 1992^{c g}
- Colastes metalli (Muesebeck, 1932)^{c g}
- Colastes moldavicus Tobias, 1986^{c g}
- Colastes montanus (Tobias & Belokobylskij, 1986)^{c}
- Colastes nuptus Papp, 1983^{c g}
- Colastes opacus Belokobylskij, 1992^{c g}
- Colastes orchesiae (Ashmead, 1889)^{c g}
- Colastes orientalis Belokobylskij, 1998^{c g}
- Colastes pacificus Belokobylskij, 1998^{c g}
- Colastes pahangensis Belokobylskij, 2000^{c g}
- Colastes phyllotomae (Muesebeck, 1932)^{c g}
- Colastes pilosiventris Belokobylskij, 1988^{c g}
- Colastes pilosus Belokobylskij, 1984^{c g}
- Colastes polypori Mason, 1968^{c g}
- Colastes postfurcalis Belokobylskij, 2000^{c g}
- Colastes propinquus (Walley, 1936)^{c g}
- Colastes pubescens Belokobylskij, 1986^{c g}
- Colastes pubicornis (Thomson, 1892)^{c g}
- Colastes rupicola Belokobylskij, 1998^{c g}
- Colastes sandei van Achterberg & Shaw, 2008^{c g}
- Colastes santacheza Belokobylskij, 1998^{c g}
- Colastes subquadratus Papp, 1975^{c g}
- Colastes sylvicola Belokobylskij, 1998^{c g}
- Colastes taegeri Belokobylskij, 1995^{c g}
- Colastes tamdaoensis Belokobylskij, 1992^{c g}
- Colastes testaceus Brèthes, 1924^{c g}
- Colastes tobiasi Belokobylskij, 1998^{c g}
- Colastes tricolor (Szépligeti, 1908)^{c g}
- Colastes unicolor Belokobylskij, 1984^{c g}
- Colastes ussuricus Belokobylskij, 1996^{c g}
- Colastes vividus Papp, 1975^{c g}
- Colastes whartoni Belokobylskij, 1992^{c g}

Data sources: i = ITIS, c = Catalogue of Life, g = GBIF, b = Bugguide.net
