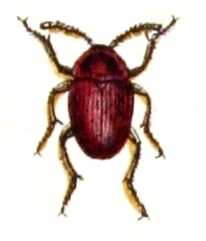

Scientific classification
- Kingdom: Animalia
- Phylum: Arthropoda
- Class: Insecta
- Order: Coleoptera
- Suborder: Polyphaga
- Infraorder: Staphyliniformia
- Family: Leiodidae
- Subfamily: Cholevinae
- Tribe: Cholevini
- Genus: Catops; Paykull, 1798

= Catops =

Genus of beetles

Catops is a genus of small carrion beetles in the family Leiodidae. There are about 16 described species in Catops.

== Species ==
- Catops alpinus Gyllenhal, 1827
- Catops alsiosus (Horn, 1885)
- Catops americanus Hatch, 1928
- Catops apterus Peck and Cook, 2002
- Catops basilaris Say, 1823
- Catops davidsoni Salgado, 1999
- Catops egenus (Horn, 1880)
- Catops geomysi Peck & Skelley, 2001
- Catops gratiosus (Blanchard, 1915)
- Catops kirbii (Spence, 1813)
- Catops luridipennis Mannerheim, 1853
- Catops luteipes Thomson, 1884
- Catops mathersi Hatch, 1957
- Catops neomeridionalis Peck and Cook, 2004
- Catops newtoni Peck, 1977
- Catops paramericanus Peck & Cook, 2002
- Catops simplex Say, 1825
