= Leptolingia =

Leptolingia Temporal range: Middle Jurassic

Scientific classification
- Kingdom: Animalia
- Phylum: Arthropoda
- Clade: Pancrustacea
- Class: Insecta
- Order: Neuroptera
- Family: †Grammolingiidae
- Genus: †Leptolingia

Extinct genus of insects

Leptolingia is an extinct genus of lacewing insect, which existed in what is now China during the Middle Jurassic period. It contains the species L. jurassica, L. tianyiensis, L. calonervis, and L. imminuta. L. imminuta is the smallest known species in the family Grammolingiidae.
