= Siphloplecton =

Scientific classification
- Domain: Eukaryota
- Kingdom: Animalia
- Phylum: Arthropoda
- Class: Insecta
- Order: Ephemeroptera
- Family: Metretopodidae
- Genus: Siphloplecton; Clemens, 1915

Genus of mayflies

Siphloplecton is a genus of cleftfooted minnow mayflies in the family Metretopodidae. There are about 15 described species in Siphloplecton.

== Species ==
These 15 species belong to the genus Siphloplecton:

- Siphloplecton barabani Staniczek & Godunko, 2012
- Siphloplecton basale (Walker, 1853)
- Siphloplecton basalis (Walker, 1853)
- Siphloplecton brunneum Berner, 1978
- Siphloplecton costalense Spieth, 1938
- Siphloplecton demoulini Staniczek & Godunko, 2012
- Siphloplecton fuscum Berner, 1978
- Siphloplecton interlineatum (Walsh, 1863)
- Siphloplecton jaegeri Demoulin, 1968
- Siphloplecton simile Berner, 1978
- Siphloplecton speciosum Traver, 1932
- † Siphloplecton gattolliati Staniczek & Godunko, 2016
- † Siphloplecton hageni Staniczek & Godunko, 2012
- † Siphloplecton picteti Staniczek & Godunko, 2012
- † Siphloplecton sartorii Staniczek & Godunko, 2016
