= Pseudobrienia =

Pseudobrienia Temporal range: Oxfordian

Scientific classification
- Kingdom: Animalia
- Phylum: Arthropoda
- Class: Insecta
- Order: Coleoptera
- Family: †Obrieniidae
- Genus: †Pseudobrienia; Legalov, 2012
- Species: †P. rasnitsyni

Binomial name
- †Pseudobrienia rasnitsyni Legalov, 2012

Extinct genus of beetles

Pseudobrienia is an extinct genus of beetles which existed in what is now Kazakhstan during the middle Late Jurassic epoch. It comprises a single species known from the Karabastau Formation, Pseudobrienia rasnitsyni, described by A. A. Legalov in 2012.
