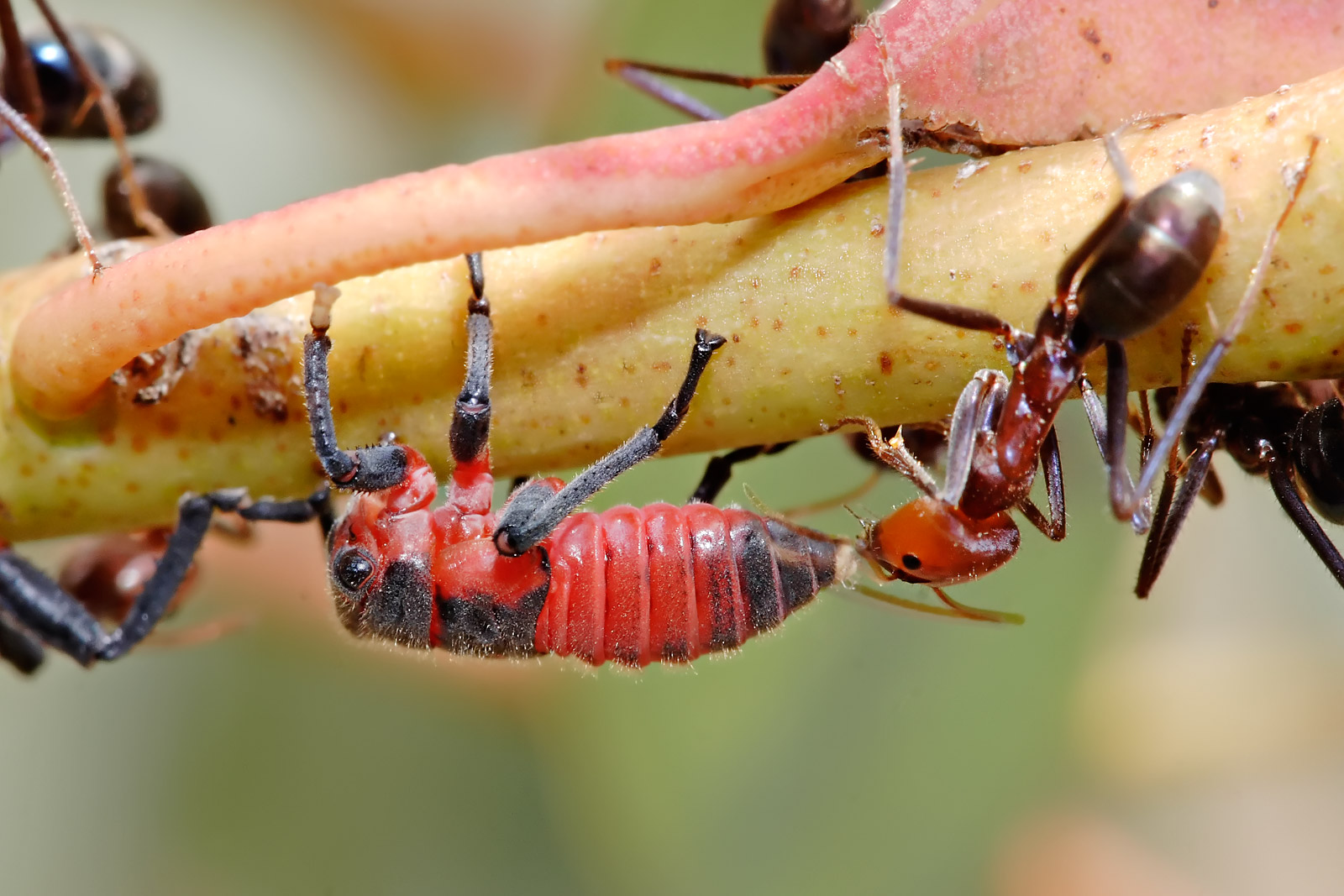
- Leafhopper nymph of the Common Jassid (Eurymela fenestrata) on a eucalyptus branch, with ant

Scientific classification
- Domain: Eukaryota
- Kingdom: Animalia
- Phylum: Arthropoda
- Class: Insecta
- Order: Hemiptera
- Suborder: Auchenorrhyncha
- Infraorder: Cicadomorpha
- Superfamily: Membracoidea; Rafinesque 1815

Families
- Aetalionidae; †Archijassidae; Cicadellidae; Melizoderidae; Membracidae; Myerslopiidae

= Membracoidea =

Membracoidea Temporal range: Late Triassic–Recent

Superfamily of true bugs

The superfamily Membracoidea of sap-sucking true-bugs includes two of the largest families within what used to be called the "Homoptera": the leafhoppers (Cicadellidae) and the treehoppers (Membracidae). The other families in this group are quite small, and have, at various points, generally been included as members within other families, though they are all presently considered to be valid, monophyletic groups. The relict family Myerslopiidae is restricted to New Zealand and South America while the Melizoderidae consist of two genera restricted to South America. The great diversity of Neotropical taxa suggests that the group originated in that region.

- Membracoidea
  - †Karajassidae
  - - †Jascopidae
    - - - - - Aetalionidae
            - Membracidae
          - Cicadellidae
        - Melizoderidae
      - Myerslopiidae

Family relations within the Membracoidea

The Membracoidea share the following anatomical characteristics, a tentorium which is incomplete, the midcoxae are enlarged; and the mid and hind tibiae have rows of setae. The position of Jascopidae represented by Jascopus notabilis and Homopterulum jelli is not entirely clear but they have setal rows on the front and middle tibiae.
