= Vadim Gratshev =

Russian entomologist (1963–2006)

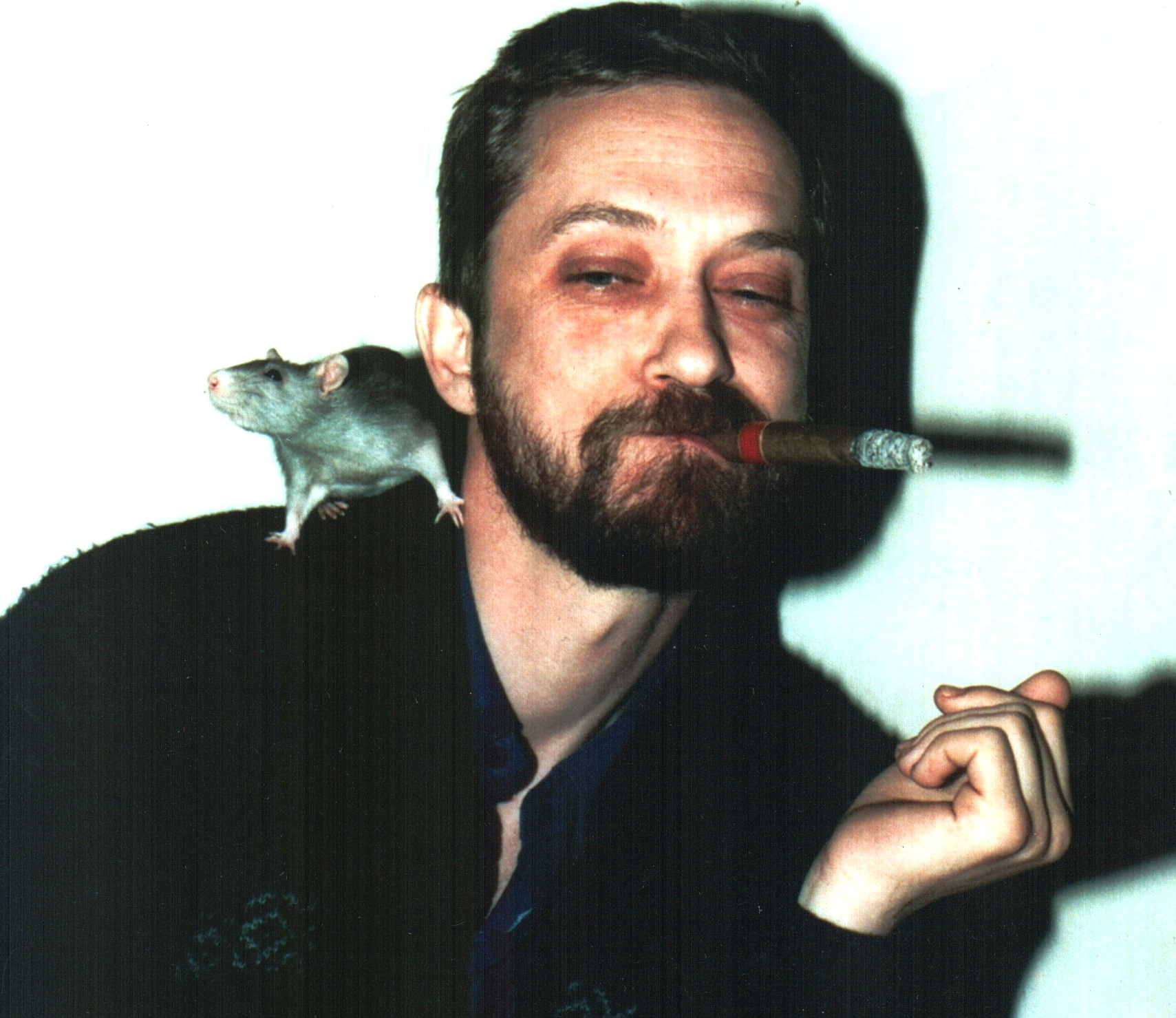
Vadim Gratshev

Vadim Gratshev (Russian: Вадим Геннадьевич Грачёв, Vadim Gennadievich Grachyov, also Grachev) (May 1, 1963 – October 17, 2006) was a Russian entomologist, and expert in paleoentomology.

== Legacy ==
Buryatnemonyx gratshevi is named after him. A number of zoological taxons are marked by "Gratshev".
