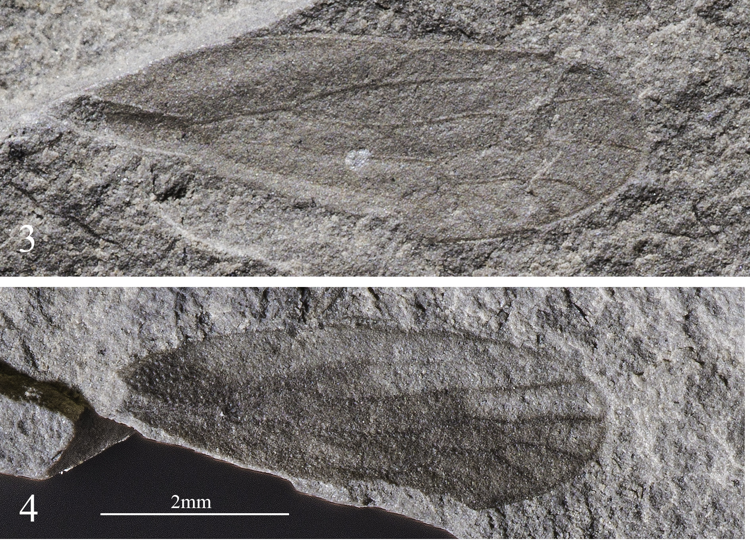
- Mesojassus ipsviciensis

Scientific classification
- Kingdom: Animalia
- Phylum: Arthropoda
- Clade: Pancrustacea
- Class: Insecta
- Order: Hemiptera
- Suborder: Auchenorrhyncha
- Superfamily: Membracoidea
- Family: †Archijassidae; Becker-Migdisova 1962

Subfamilies and genera
- See text

= Archijassidae =

Archijassidae Temporal range: Norian–Cenomanian

Extinct family of true bugs

Archijassidae is an extinct family of leafhoppers known from the Late Triassic to the early Late Cretaceous. It is the oldest member of Membracoidea, and is considered ancestral to modern leafhoppers and treehoppers.

== Taxonomy ==
Shcherbakov 2012 divided the family into 3 subfamilies, Shcherbakov considered the subfamily Dellasharinae to be ancestral to modern treehoppers and leafhoppers.

- †Formosixinia Chen and Wang 2019 Burmese amber, Myanmar, Cenomanian
  - †Formosixinia aeterna Chen and Wang 2019
- †subfamily Archijassinae Becker-Migdisova 1962
  - †Archijassus Handlirsch 1906
    - †Archijassus heeri Geinitz 1880 Green Series, Germany, Toarcian
    - †Archijassus minimus Martynov 1926 Karabastau Formation, Kazakhstan, Callovian
    - †Archijassus minutus Heer 1865 Insektenmergel Formation, Switzerland, Hettangian
    - †Archijassus morio Heer 1865 Insektenmergel Formation, Switzerland, Hettangian
    - †Archijassus plurinervis Zhang 1985 Laiyang Formation, China, Aptian
    - †Cixiella reducta Becker-Migdisova 1962 Dzhil Formation, Kyrgyzstan, Sinemurian
    - †Mesocicada verrucosa Becker-Migdisova 1962 Dzhil Formation, Kyrgyzstan, Sinemurian
  - †Ardela Ansorge 1996 Green Series, Germany, Toarcian
    - †Ardela grimmenensis Ansorge 1996
  - †Mesojassus Tillyard 1916 (= Triassojassus Tillyard, 1919, = Triassocotis Evans, 1956, = Hylicellites Becker-Migdisova, 1962) Blackstone Formation, Australia, Norian
    - Mesojassus ipsviciensis Tillyard, 1916 (= Triassojassus proavitus Tillyard, 1919, = Triassocotis stricta Evans, 1961)
    - Mesojassus australis (Evans, 1956) (= Triassocotis amplicata Evans, 1961 = Hylicellites reducta (Evans, 1956))
  - †Mesoledra Evans 1956 Green Series, Germany, Toarcian
    - †Mesoledra pachyneura Handlirsch 1939
  - †Karamayojassus Badaowan Formation, China, Early Jurassic (Sinemurian)
- †subfamily Dellasharinae Shcherbakov 2012
  - †Acocephalites Meunier 1904 La Pedrera de Rúbies Formation, Spain, Barremian
    - †Acocephalites breddini Meunier 1904
  - †Dellashara Shcherbakov 2012 Shar-Teg, Mongolia, Tithonian
    - †Dellashara tega Shcherbakov 2012
  - †Homopterulum Handlirsch 1907
    - †Homopterulum jelli Hamilton 1992 Koonwarra Fossil Bed, Australia, Aptian
    - †Homopterulum signoretii Westwood 1854 Lulworth Formation, United Kingdom, Berriasian
  - †Mesoccus Zhang 1985 Laiyang Formation, China, Aptian
    - †Mesoccus advenus Zhang 1985
    - †Mesoccus lutarius Zhang 1985
  - †Myangadina Shcherbakov 1986
    - †Myangadina longa Shcherbakov 1986 Gurvan-Eren Formation, Mongolia, Aptian
    - †Myangadina nana Shcherbakov 1986 Gurvan-Eren Formation, Mongolia, Aptian
    - †Myangadina tetrops Shcherbakov 1988 Kutinskaya Formation, Russia, Barremian
- †subfamily Karajassinae Shcherbakov 1992
  - †Cicadellium Westwood 1854
    - †Cicadellium dipsas Westwood 1854 Durlston Formation, United Kingdom, Berriasian
    - †Cicadellium pulcher Brodie 1845 Lulworth Formation, United Kingdom, Berriasian
  - †Karajassus Martynov 1926 Karabastau Formation, Kazakhstan, Callovian
    - †Karajassus crassinervis Martynov 1926
  - †Kemobius Shcherbakov 2012 Itat Formation, Russia, Bathonian
    - †Kemobius lux Shcherbakov 2012
  - †Kisa Shcherbakov 2012 Itat Formation, Russia, Bathonian
    - †Kisa fasciata Shcherbakov 2012
  - †Kubecola Shcherbakov 2012 Itat Formation, Russia, Bathonian
    - †Kubecola guttatus Shcherbakov 2012
  - †Purbecellus Shcherbakov 2012 Durlston Formation, United Kingdom, Berriasian
    - †Purbecellus psocus (Westwood 1854)
