= Electromethes =

Scientific classification
- Domain: Eukaryota
- Kingdom: Animalia
- Phylum: Arthropoda
- Class: Insecta
- Order: Coleoptera
- Suborder: Polyphaga
- Infraorder: Elateriformia
- Family: Omethidae
- Genus: †Electromethes; Kazantsev, 2012

Other species
- †Electromethes kazantsevi Alekseev, 2025

Genus of beetles

Electromethes is an extinct genus of beetle closely resembling members of the family Omethidae. It existed in what is now Lithuania during the Eocene epoch. It was described by Sergey V. Kazantsev in 2012, and contains the species Electromethes alleni, which was found within Baltic amber.
