= Grammolingiidae =

Grammolingiidae Temporal range: Middle Jurassic

Scientific classification
- Kingdom: Animalia
- Phylum: Arthropoda
- Class: Insecta
- Order: Neuroptera
- Family: †Grammolingiidae

Genera
- Chorilingia; Grammolingia; Leptolingia; Litholingia

Extinct family of insects

Grammolingiidae is an extinct family of lacewing insect which existed in what is now China during the Middle Jurassic period.

Leptolingia imminuta, a species described in 2011, is the smallest known species in the family Grammolingiidae.

== See also ==
- 2011 in paleontology
- 2012 in arthropod paleontology
