= Trichotanypus =

Scientific classification
- Domain: Eukaryota
- Kingdom: Animalia
- Phylum: Arthropoda
- Class: Insecta
- Order: Diptera
- Family: Chironomidae
- Genus: Trichotanypus; Kieffer, 1906

Genus of flies

Trichotanypus is a genus of flies belonging to the family Chironomidae.

The species of this genus are found in Northern Europe and North America.

Species:

- Trichotanypus abditus (Kieffer, 1924)
- Trichotanypus aberrata Makarchenko, 1983
