= Hormius =

Scientific classification
- Kingdom: Animalia
- Phylum: Arthropoda
- Clade: Pancrustacea
- Class: Insecta
- Order: Hymenoptera
- Family: Braconidae
- Tribe: Hormiini
- Genus: Hormius; Nees, 1818

Genus of wasps

Hormius is a genus of parasitoid wasp in the subfamily Hormiinae first described by Christian Gottfried Daniel Nees von Esenbeck in 1818.

== Species ==
- Hormius abnormis Belokobylskij, 1995
- Hormius aemulus Belokobylskij, 1989
- Hormius affinis (Hedqvist, 1963)
- Hormius albipes Ashmead, 1895
- Hormius americanus Ashmead, 1890
- Hormius amus Papp, 1990
- Hormius anamariamongeae Sharkey, 2021
- Hormius angelsolisi Sharkey, 2021
- Hormius anniapicadoae Sharkey, 2021
- Hormius antefurcalis Belokobylskij, 1995
- Hormius appositus Belokobylskij, 1995
- Hormius argutus Belokobylskij, 1989
- Hormius arthurchapmani Sharkey, 2021
- Hormius australis Belokobylskij, 1989
- Hormius barryhammeli Sharkey, 2021
- Hormius belliatus Belokobylskij, 1989
- Hormius caboverdensis Hedqvist, 1965
- Hormius capensis Hedqvist, 1963
- Hormius carloswalkeri Sharkey, 2021
- Hormius carmenretanae Sharkey, 2021
- Hormius cesarsuarezi Sharkey, 2021
- Hormius crassivalvus Belokobylskij, 1989
- Hormius danbrooksi Sharkey, 2021
- Hormius decembris Belokobylskij, 1990
- Hormius deletus Wharton, 1993
- Hormius dispar (Brues, 1907)
- Hormius eddysanchezi Sharkey, 2021
- Hormius elegans Szepligeti, 1914
- Hormius elongatus (Hedqvist, 1963)
- Hormius erikframstadi Sharkey, 2021
- Hormius ferrugineus (Hedqvist, 1963)
- Hormius flavicauda Granger, 1949
- Hormius gelechiae Belokobylskij, 2001
- Hormius georgedavisi Sharkey, 2021
- Hormius grettelvegae Sharkey, 2021
- Hormius gustavoinduni Sharkey, 2021
- Hormius hartmanguidoi Sharkey, 2021
- Hormius hectoraritai Sharkey, 2021
- Hormius hesiquiobenitezi Sharkey, 2021
- Hormius hirtus Belokobylskij, 1989
- Hormius ikarus Belokobylskij, 1995
- Hormius intermedius (Hedqvist, 1963)
- Hormius irenecanasae Sharkey, 2021
- Hormius isidrochaconi Sharkey, 2021
- Hormius jaygallegosi Sharkey, 2021
- Hormius jimbeachi Sharkey, 2021
- Hormius jimlewisi Sharkey, 2021
- Hormius joelcracrafti Sharkey, 2021
- Hormius johanvalerioi Sharkey, 2021
- Hormius johnburleyi Sharkey, 2021
- Hormius joncoddingtoni Sharkey, 2021
- Hormius jorgecarvajali Sharkey, 2021
- Hormius juanmatai Sharkey, 2021
- Hormius keralicus Narendran, 1999
- Hormius lamidae Papp, 1990
- Hormius longipilosus Belokobylskij, 1989
- Hormius longistigmus Belokobylskij, 1989
- Hormius longiventris Belokobylskij, 1988
- Hormius macroculatus Belokobylskij, 1989
- Hormius maderae Graham, 1986
- Hormius manuelzumbadoi Sharkey, 2021
- Hormius melleus (Ashmead, 1889)
- Hormius mercedesfosterae Sharkey, 2021
- Hormius minialatus Tobias, 1977
- Hormius modonnellyae Sharkey, 2021
- Hormius moniliatus (Nees, 1811)
- Hormius montanus Belokobylskij, 1995
- Hormius nelsonzamorai Sharkey, 2021
- Hormius notus Belokobylskij, 1995
- Hormius oreas Graham, 1986
- Hormius orientalis Belokobylskij, 1980
- Hormius pacificus (Ashmead, 1905)
- Hormius pallidus Belokobylskij, 1990
- Hormius pamelacastilloae Sharkey, 2021
- Hormius paraphrasis Belokobylskij, 1995
- Hormius propodealis (Belokobylskij, 1989)
- Hormius radialis Telenga, 1941
- Hormius raycypessi Sharkey, 2021
- Hormius ritacolwellae Sharkey, 2021
- Hormius robcolwelli Sharkey, 2021
- Hormius rogerblancosegurai Sharkey, 2021
- Hormius romani (Hedqvist, 1963)
- Hormius ronaldzunigai Sharkey, 2021
- Hormius rugosicollis Ashmead, 1895
- Hormius rugosus (Hedqvist, 1963)
- Hormius russchapmani Sharkey, 2021
- Hormius sculpturatus Tobias, 1967
- Hormius similis Szepligeti, 1896
- Hormius solocipes (Enderlein, 1912)
- Hormius submersus (Brues, 1933)
- Hormius tenuicornis Graham, 1986
- Hormius teutoniae (Hedqvist, 1963)
- Hormius tsugae Mason, 1968
- Hormius virginiaferrisae Sharkey, 2021
- Hormius vitabilis Papp, 1990
- Hormius vulgaris Ashmead, 1893
- Hormius warrenbrighami Sharkey, 2021
- Hormius willsflowersi Sharkey, 2021
