= Magadanobracon =

Magadanobracon Temporal range: Cenomanian

Scientific classification
- Kingdom: Animalia
- Phylum: Arthropoda
- Class: Insecta
- Order: Hymenoptera
- Family: Braconidae
- Subfamily: †Protorhyssalinae
- Genus: †Magadanobracon; Belokobylskij, 2012

Extinct genus of wasps

Magadanobracon is an extinct genus of wasps which existed in what is now Russia during the Cenomanian age. It was described by Sergey A. Belokobylskij, and contains the species M. rasnitsyni and M. zherikhini.
