= Lasiodiamesa =

Scientific classification
- Kingdom: Animalia
- Phylum: Arthropoda
- Clade: Pancrustacea
- Class: Insecta
- Order: Diptera
- Family: Chironomidae
- Genus: Lasiodiamesa; Kieffer, 1924

Genus of flies

Lasiodiamesa is a genus of flies belonging to the family Chironomidae. The species of this genus are found in Europe and North America.

Species in the genus include:

- Lasiodiamesa arietina (Coquillett, 1908)
- Lasiodiamesa armata Brundin, 1966
- Lasiodiamesa gracilis (Kieffer 1924)
- Lasiodiamesa sphagnicola (Kieffer 1925)
