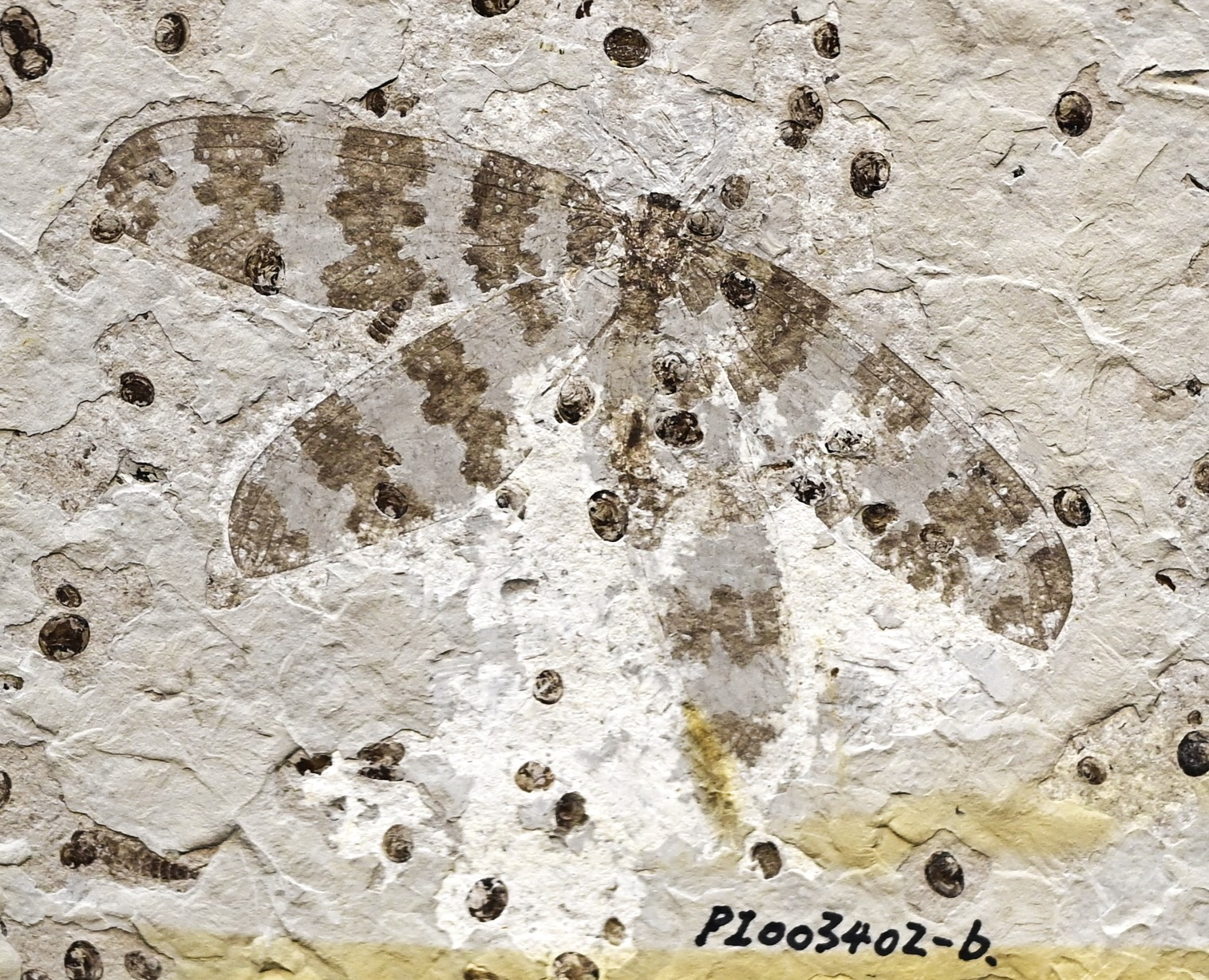
- L. rhora, National Natural History Museum of China

Scientific classification
- Kingdom: Animalia
- Phylum: Arthropoda
- Clade: Pancrustacea
- Class: Insecta
- Order: Neuroptera
- Family: †Grammolingiidae
- Genus: †Litholingia

= Litholingia =

Litholingia Temporal range: Middle Jurassic

Extinct genus of insects

Litholingia is an extinct genus of lacewing insect which existed in what is now China during the Middle Jurassic period. It contains the species L. ptesa, L. rhora, L. eumorpha, and L. polychotoma.
