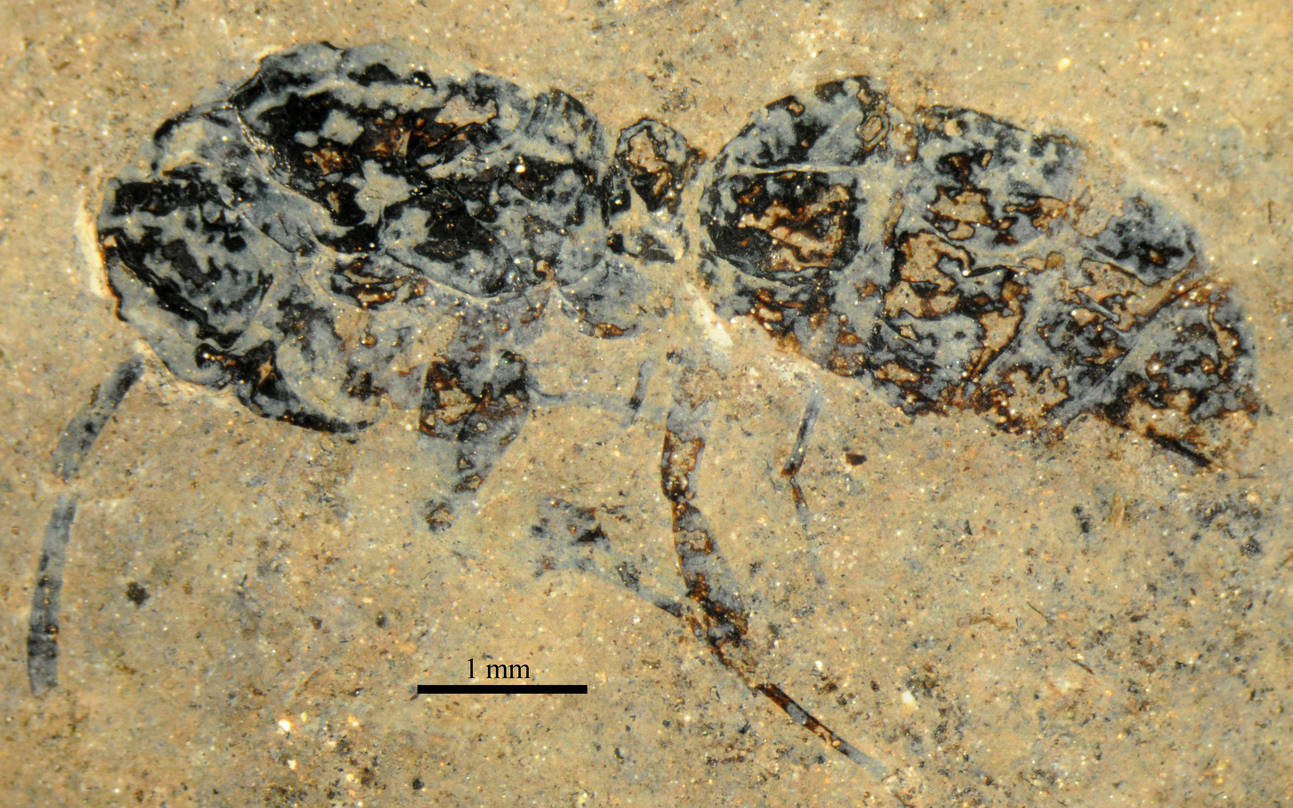
- P. eocenica holotype

Scientific classification
- Kingdom: Animalia
- Phylum: Arthropoda
- Clade: Pancrustacea
- Class: Insecta
- Order: Hymenoptera
- Family: Formicidae
- Subfamily: Ectatomminae
- Genus: †Pseudectatomma; Dlussky & Wedmann, 2012

Type species
- Pseudectatomma eocenica Dlussky & Wedmann, 2012

Other species
- P. striatula Dlussky & Wedmann, 2012

= Pseudectatomma =

Pseudectatomma Temporal range: Lutetian, 47 Ma

Genus of ants

Pseudectatomma is an extinct genus of ants in the formicid subfamily Ectatomminae described from fossils found in Europe. The genus contains two species dating from the Eocene, Pseudectatomma eocenica and Pseudectatomma striatula.

== History and classification ==
When described, Pseudectatomma was known from four fossil insects which are compression-impression fossils preserved in layers of soft sedimentary rock. Along with other well preserved insect fossils, the Pseudectatomma specimens were collected from layers of the Lutetian Messel pit World Heritage Site. The formation is composed of brown coals, oil shales, and bituminous shale, which preserved numerous insects, fish, birds, reptiles, and terrestrial mammals as a notable lagerstätten. The area is a preserved maar lake which initially formed approximately 47 million years ago as the result of volcanic explosions.

At the time of description, the holotype and paratype specimens were preserved in the Senckenberg Research Station Messel fossil collections. The fossils were described by Gennady Dlussky and Sonja Wedmann in a 2012 paper on the poneromorph ants of Messel, with the genus and both species named in it. The genus name is a combination of the ant genus Ectatomma and the Greek word pseudo, meaning false. The specific epithet "eocenica" is derived from the Eocene age of the fossil, while the name "striatula" is based on the Latin striatulus, meaning "marked by parallel lines".

== Description ==
In both species the pronotum has an upper front surface that is rounded and not angular, lacking a tooth. The petiole is node shaped, separating it from the extinct genus Electroponera that has a much more angular petiole. The rear side of the metatibiae do not have a median tooth, as seen in modern Ectatomminae genera. The gaster is different from the modern Gnamptogenys and Rhytidoponera in that the trapezoid shaped second segment is not notably rounded as in the modern genera.

== Species ==
As of 2024, Pseudectatomma contains two valid species, both of which are extinct.

- Pseudectatomma eocenica
- Pseudectatomma striatula

=== Pseudectatomma eocenica ===
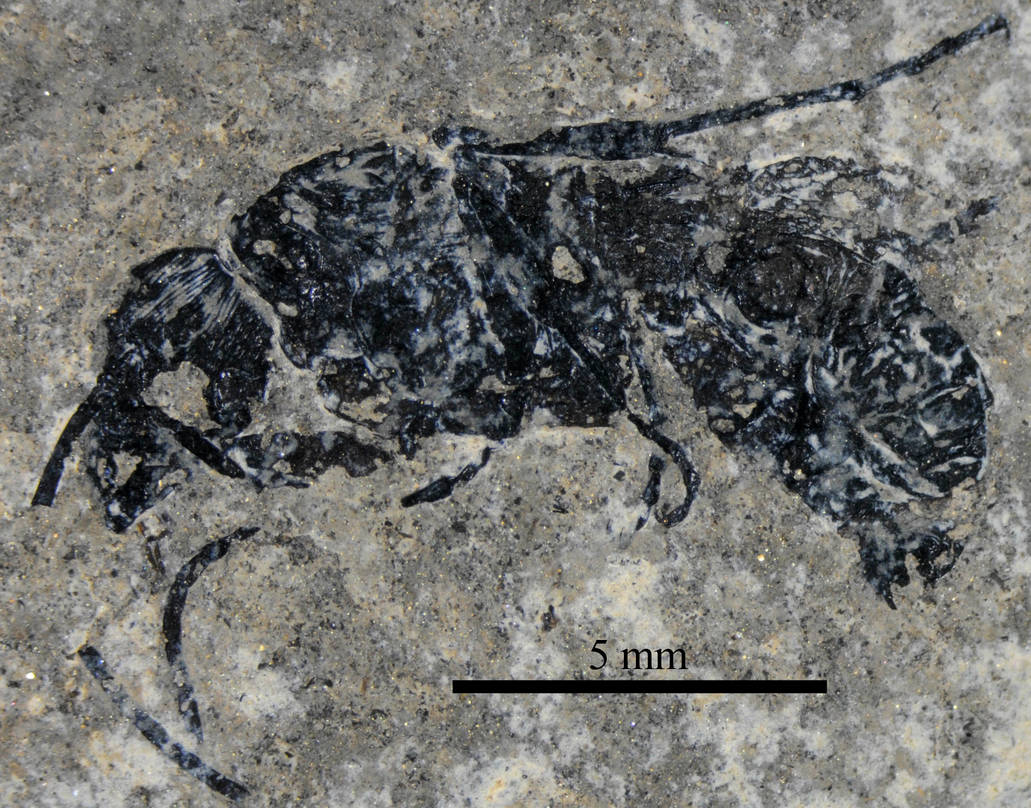
P. striatula holotype,

The type fossil for P. eocenica is a female gyne that was preserved as a lateral imprint in the matrix. Overall the body length as preserved is 9.2 mm (0.36 in) with forewings that are 3.2 mm (0.13 in) long. The eyes, funicular segment, tibial spurs and pretarsal claws are all missing or not preserved in the only known fossil. The head capsule is longer than wide, and The scape is 1.5 times as long as the head capsule, extending beyond the occipital margin. Over half of the head length is composed of the mandibles, which are triangular in outline, with no tooth dentition preserved.

=== Pseudectatomma striatula ===
P. striatula is known from both lateral and dorsal imprints of reproductive females. The dorsal imprint is not fully preserved but the length is estimated between 15–16 mm (0.59–0.63 in). Unlike P. eocenica, the head capsule is nearly the same length as it is wide. The eyes are preserved and show the compound eyes placed just to the rear of the heads midpoint and there are three ocelli placed into a triangle. The scape is about as long as the head and protrudes beyond the posterior margin. The mandibles are just over half the heads length, with at least five teeth on each. There are notable distinct parallel longitudinal lines on the head.
