= Electotreta =

Scientific classification
- Kingdom: Animalia
- Phylum: Arthropoda
- Class: Insecta
- Order: Coleoptera
- Suborder: Polyphaga
- Infraorder: Elateriformia
- Family: Lampyridae
- Subfamily: Ototretinae
- Genus: †Electotreta; Kazantsev, 2012

Extinct genus of fireflies

Electotreta is an extinct genus of firefly closely resembling Ototretinae from the Eocene Epoch. It was described by Sergey V. Kazantsev in 2012, and the type species is Electotreta rasnitsyni. It was found within Baltic amber.
