= Glypholomatinae =

Scientific classification
- Kingdom: Animalia
- Phylum: Arthropoda
- Clade: Pancrustacea
- Class: Insecta
- Order: Coleoptera
- Suborder: Polyphaga
- Infraorder: Staphyliniformia
- Family: Staphylinidae
- Subfamily: Glypholomatinae; Jeannel, 1962

Glypholomatinae is a subfamily of beetles in the family Staphylinidae. It was first described by Jeannel in 1962. There are 10 species split between 3 genera.

== Genera and species ==
Genus: Glypholoma Jeannel, 1962

- Glypholoma chepuense Thayer, 1997
- Glypholoma germaini Thayer, 1997
- Glypholoma pecki Thayer & Newton, 1979
- Glypholoma pustuliferum Jeannel, 1962
- Glypholoma rotundulum Thayer & Newton, 1979
- Glypholoma temporale Thayer & Newton, 1979
- Glypholoma tenuicorne Thayer & Newton, 1979

Genus: †Jurglypholoma Cai, Chenyang, Diying Huang, Thayer & Newton, 2012

- †Juroglypholoma antiquum Cai, Chenyang, Diying Huang, Thayer & Newton, 2012
- †Jurglypholoma talbragarense Cai, chenyang, Yan, Beattie, Bo Wang & Diying Huang, 2013

Genus: Proglypholoma Thayer, 1997

- Proglypholoma aenigma Thayer, 1997
