= Alexandrinia =

Alexandrinia Temporal range: Early Permian–Upper Permian

Scientific classification
- Domain: Eukaryota
- Kingdom: Animalia
- Phylum: Arthropoda
- Class: Insecta
- (unranked): Panephemeroptera
- (unranked): Ephemerida
- (unranked): †Permoplectoptera
- Family: †Protereismatidae
- Genus: †Alexandrinia; Sinitshenkova & Vassilenko, 2012

Type species
- Alexandrinia gigantea Sinitshenkova & Vassilenko, 2012

Species
- Alexandrinia directa (Carpenter, 1979); Alexandrinia gigantea Sinitshenkova & Vassilenko, 2012; Alexandrinia ipsa Sinitshenkova, 2013; Alexandrinia vitta Sinitshenkova, 2013

Genus of stem-group mayflies from the Permian

Alexandrinia is an extinct genus of stem-group mayflies which existed in what is now Russia and the United States during the Permian period. It was described by N. D. Sinitshenkova and D. V. Vassilenko in 2012, and contains four species: A. gigantea, A. directa, A. ipsa and A. vitta. The genus is named in honor of Russian entomologist Alexandr Rasnitsyn.
