= Olemehlia =

Scientific classification
- Kingdom: Animalia
- Phylum: Arthropoda
- Class: Insecta
- Order: Coleoptera
- Suborder: Polyphaga
- Infraorder: Cucujiformia
- Family: Disteniidae
- Genus: Olemehlia; Holzschuh, 2011
- Species: O. mystica

Binomial name
- Olemehlia mystica Holzschuh, 2011

Genus of beetles

Olemehlia is a genus of disteniid beetles. It is monotypic, being represented by the single species Olemehlia mystica.
