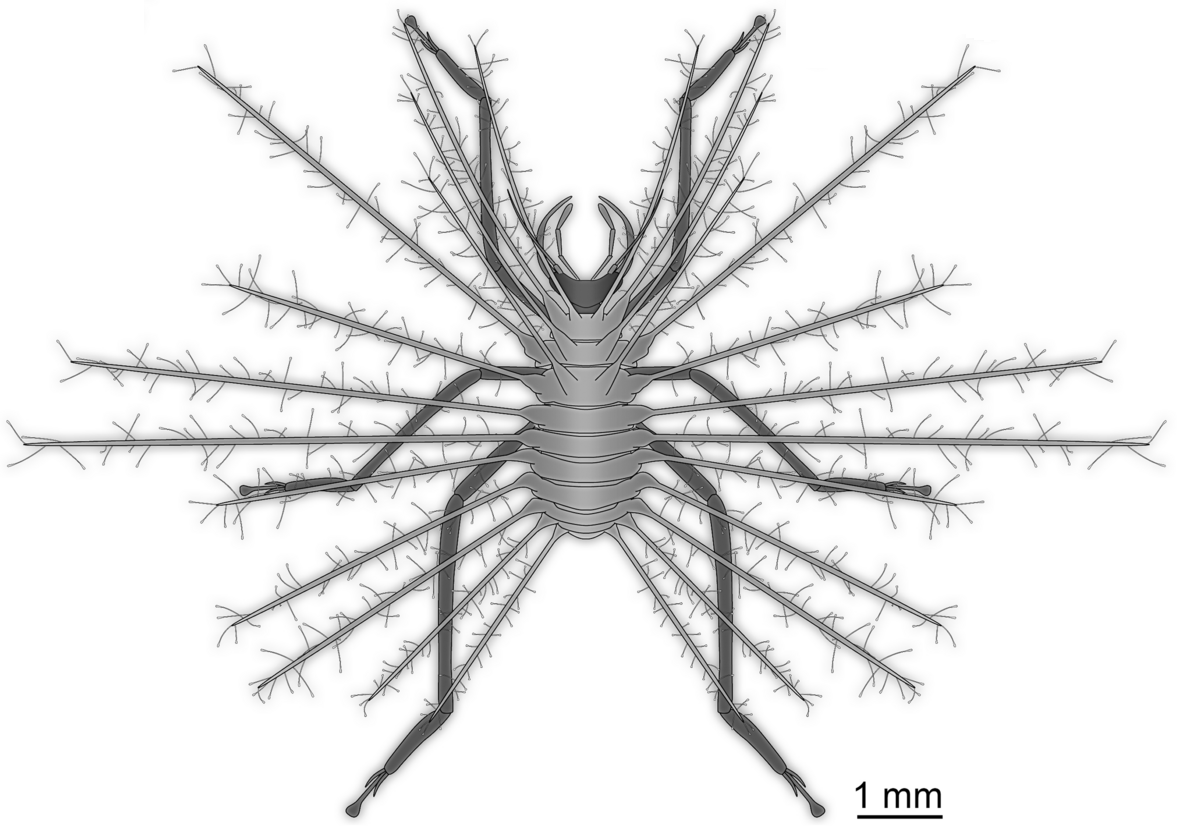
- Restoration

Scientific classification
- Kingdom: Animalia
- Phylum: Arthropoda
- Clade: Pancrustacea
- Class: Insecta
- Order: Neuroptera
- Family: Chrysopidae
- Genus: †Hallucinochrysa; Pérez-de la Fuente et al., 2012

Type species
- †Hallucinochrysa diogenesi Pérez-de la Fuente et al., 2012

= Hallucinochrysa =

Hallucinochrysa Temporal range: Early Cretaceous (Albian), 110 Ma

Extinct genus of green lacewing from the Early Cretaceous

Hallucinochrysa (meaning "peculiar green lace wing") is an extinct genus of green lacewing from the Early Cretaceous period, approximately 110 million years ago.

== Discovery ==
Discovered in 2008 in Spain, by a team of researchers, including Ricardo Pérez-de la Fuente and Xavier Delclòs, who later formally described it in 2012. The fossil was found in amber from the El Soplao outcrop in Cantabria, Spain, and dates back to the Early Cretaceous period, approximately 110 million years ago. The discovery revealed significant information about the ancient ecosystem of the time and the diversity of insects during the Cretaceous.

== Description ==
Photo of the holotype fossil (top) and speculative life restoration of two individuals (bottom)

The fossilized larva measures approximately 4 millimeters in length and exhibits a distinctive form compared to modern green lacewing larvae. Its body is adorned with elongated, trumpet-shaped tubercles that anchor a dense collection of plant trichomes, primarily from ferns. This arrangement forms a dorsal basket, effectively camouflaging the larva and protecting it from predators. This behavior, known as "trash-carrying", is observed in contemporary lacewing larvae and provides insight into early evolutionary adaptations for survival.

== Etymology ==
The name Hallucinochrysa is derived from 'hallucinatus', referencing its peculiar and seemingly surreal appearance, and 'Chrysa', a common suffix in Chrysopidae, while the species name diogenesi honors the Greek philosopher Diogenes, referring to the behavior of the larva.
