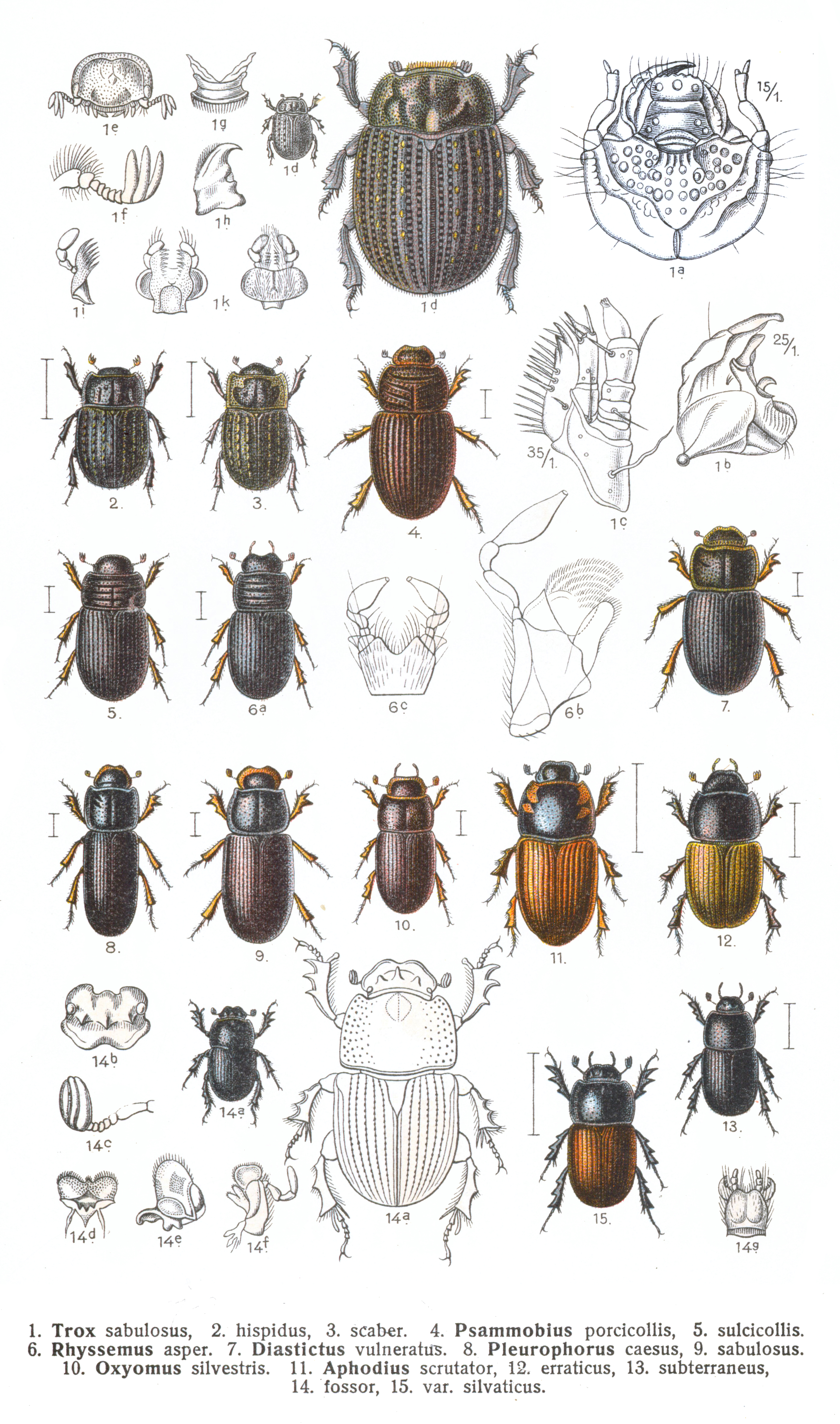
- Scarabaeoidea from Central Europe with anatomical details

Scientific classification
- Kingdom: Animalia
- Phylum: Arthropoda
- Clade: Pancrustacea
- Class: Insecta
- Order: Coleoptera
- Suborder: Polyphaga
- Infraorder: Scarabaeiformia; Crowson, 1960
- Superfamily: Scarabaeoidea; Latreille, 1802

= Scarabaeoidea =

Scarabaeoidea Temporal range: Jurassic–Recent

Superfamily of beetles

Scarabaeoidea is a superfamily of beetles, the only subgroup of the infraorder Scarabaeiformia. Around 35,000 species are placed in this superfamily and some 200 new species are described each year. Some of its constituent families are undergoing revision, and the family list below is provisional. This superfamily includes some of the largest beetles extant today, including rhinoceros beetles (Dynastinae), especially the Hercules beetle (Dynastes hercules) and the Goliath beetles (Goliathus sp.).

The oldest confirmed member of the group is the extinct genus Alloioscarabaeus from the Middle Jurassic period Jiulongshan Formation of Inner Mongolia, China.

== Families ==
The following families are currently recognised:

- Belohinidae Paulian, 1959
- Bolboceratidae Mulsant, 1842
- Diphyllostomatidae Holloway, 1972 (false stag beetles)
- Geotrupidae Latreille, 1802 (earth-boring dung beetles)
- Glaphyridae MacLeay, 1819 (bumble bee scarab beetles)
- Glaresidae Kolbe, 1905 (enigmatic scarab beetles)
- Hybosoridae Erichson, 1847 (scavenging scarab beetles)
  - inclusive of Ceratocanthidae White, 1842 (pill scarab beetles)
- Lucanidae Latreille 1804 (stag beetles)
- Ochodaeidae Mulsant and Rey 1871 (sand-loving scarab beetles)
- Passalidae Leach, 1815 (bess beetles)
- Pleocomidae LeConte 1861 (rain beetles)
- Scarabaeidae Latreille 1802 (scarab beetles)
- Trogidae MacLeay 1819 (hide beetles)
- † Alloioscarabaeidae Bai, Ren & Yang, 2012
- † Coprinisphaeridae Genise, 2004 (ichnotaxon)
- † Pallichnidae Genise, 2004 (ichnotaxon)
- † Passalopalpidae Boucher, et al., 2016
- † Septiventeridae Bai et al., 2012

== See also ==
- List of subgroups of the order Coleoptera
