= Praeichneumon =

Praeichneumon Temporal range: Lower Cretaceous

Scientific classification
- Kingdom: Animalia
- Phylum: Arthropoda
- Class: Insecta
- Order: Hymenoptera
- Superfamily: Ichneumonoidea
- Family: †Praeichneumonidae; Rasnitsyn, 1983
- Genus: †Praeichneumon; Rasnitsyn, 1983

Species
- P. townesi Rasnitsyn, 1983; P. transbaikalicus Rasnitsyn, 1990; P. dzhidensis Kopylov, 2012; P. khamardabanicus Kopylov, 2012; P. zakhaaminicus Kopylov, 2012

Extinct genus of wasps

Praeichneumon is an extinct genus of ichneumon wasps from the Lower Cretaceous of Mongolia and the Russian region of Transbaikalia. It was originally described by Alexandr Pavlovich Rasnitsyn in 1983, who also added a second species in 1990. Three new species were described by D. S. Kopylov in 2012.
