= Bechala =

Bechala Temporal range: Namurian

Scientific classification
- Domain: Eukaryota
- Kingdom: Animalia
- Phylum: Arthropoda
- Class: Insecta
- Superorder: Odonatoptera
- Family: †Bechalidae
- Genus: †Bechala
- Species: †B. sommeri

Binomial name
- †Bechala sommeri Ilger & Brauckmann, 2012

Extinct genus of insects

Bechala is a genus of insects that existed during the Late Carboniferous in what is now Germany. It was first described by Jan-Michael Ilger and Carsten Brauckmann in 2012, and the type species is B. sommeri. Its type specimen was a wing (AKH 524) discovered at the Küchenberg quarry, in the Ziegelschiefer Formation. The wing measurements are 39×6 millimetres. Bechala was originally assigned to the extinct order Megasecoptera, but a restudy instead assigned it to the superorder Odonatoptera.
