= Metretopodidae =

Scientific classification
- Domain: Eukaryota
- Kingdom: Animalia
- Phylum: Arthropoda
- Class: Insecta
- Order: Ephemeroptera
- Suborder: Pisciforma
- Family: Metretopodidae

Family of mayflies

Metretopodidae is a family of cleftfooted minnow mayflies in the order Ephemeroptera. There are at least 3 genera and more than 20 described species in Metretopodidae.

== Genera ==
These three genera belong to the family Metretopodidae:

- Metreplecton Kluge, 1996
- Metretopus Eaton, 1901
- Siphloplecton Clemens, 1915
