= Paleobiota of the Koshelevka Formation =

The Koshelevka Formation is a Permian formation in Russia containing the Tshekarda lagerstätte, which preserves over 200 insect species.

== Insects ==
=== Odonatoptera ===
Odonatopterans
Genus	Species	Higher taxon	Notes	Images
Ditaxineurella	D. stigmalis	Protanisoptera incertae sedis		
Proditaxineura	P. pritykinae	Ditaxineuridae (Protanisoptera)		

=== Holometabola ===
Holometabolans
Genus	Species	Higher taxon	Notes	Images
Sylvacoleus	S. richteri, S. sharovi	Tshekardocoleidae	Has a relatively long abdomen, named after the Sylva River	Isolated elytron of S. richteri
Sylvacoleodes	S. admirandus	Tshekardocoleidae	Resembles Sylvacoleus, but has a narrower head	
Tshekardocoleus	T. magnus	Tshekardocoleidae	Type genus of the family, wing venation quite similar to the hypothetical ancestral beetle	
Cavalarva	C. caudata	Holometabola incertae sedis	Shares characteristics with larvae from numerous holometabolan orders	

=== Paraneoptera ===
Paraneopterans
Genus	Species	Higher taxon	Notes	Images
Graticladus	G. apiatus	Ischnoneuridae (Hypoperlida)	Placed in Hypoperlida, which was reclassified as stem-Paraneoptera in 2017	
Tshekardoclardus	T. sparsus	Tococladidae	Placed in Hypoperlida, which was reclassified as stem-Paraneoptera in 2017	

=== Polyneoptera (excluding Notoptera) ===
Non-Notopteran Polyneopterans
Genus	Species	Higher taxon	Notes	Images
Arachnophasma	A. scurra	Permophasmatidae	Oldest stick insect known, has very long legs and a short body	
Uraloblatta	U. insignis	Archimylacridae ("Eoblattodea")	Has a relatively long oviscapt	

=== Notoptera ===
Notopterans
Genus	Species	Higher taxon	Notes	Images
Artinska	A. infigurabilis	Lemmatophoridae		
Bardapteron	B. ovale	Atactophlebiidae	Formerly placed with paleodictyopterans, known from the less diverse Barda locality as opposed to Chekarda	
Chelopterum	C. ultimum	Chelopteridae		
Cucullistriga	C. cucullata	Idelinellidae	Named after the hood-like pronotum covering its head	
Culiciforma	C. formosa	Lemmatophoridae	Similar to Megorkhosa	
Czekardia	C. blattoides	Eoblattida incertae sedis	Preserves stripes and spots on its tergites, only known from a nymph	
Depressopterum	D. bardum	Liomopteridae		
Euryptilodes	E. commatulus	Euryptilonidae	Known from wings and exuviae of nymphs	
Iblatta	I. attrepida	Eoblattida incertae sedis	Only known from a nymph, has quite short legs and a small head	
Jubala	J. pectinata	Euryptilonidae	Formerly placed within Sylvardembia	
Khosarophlebia	K. sylvaensis	Liomopteridae	Formerly known from a wing fragment, but had a complete specimen discovered later	
Kishertia	K. tricubitalis	Pinideliidae	Distinguished from Pinidelia by wing venation and size	
Koshelevka	K. megakhosaroides	Doubraviidae	Formerly included in Cerasopterum	
Kungurocauda	K. spinosa	Sylviaphlebiidae	Second-smallest member of the family behind Sylvophenoptera	
Kungurolioma	K. cancellata	Liomopteridae		
Lemmatonympha	L. gracilis, L. gracilissima	Lemmatophoridae	Identifiable to family based on its tarsi and cerci	
Liomopterella	L. kungurica	Liomopteridae		
Micaidelia	M. minutissima	Ideliidae	Similar to Anaidelia	
Neprotembia	N. truncata	Permulidae	Similar to Neraphidia	
Neraphidia	N. mitis, N. rigida	Neraphidiidae	Formerly only known from part of a forewing, but a complete specimen was discovered later	
Novokshonovus	N. ignoratus	Atactophlebiidae	Related to Kirkorella	
Ornaticosta	O. novokshonovi	Liomopteridae		
Parakhosara	P. coalita	Megakhosaridae		
Parasheimia	P. truncata, P. rotundata	Sheimiidae	Larger than Sheimia and has a wider pronotum	
Parastenaropodites	P. stirps	Mesorthopteridae		
Parasylvaella	P. umbra, P. minor	Liomopteridae		
Parasylviodes	P. tetracladus	Liomopteridae		
Paratillyardembia	P. sepicolorata	Protembiidae	Has an unusual pronotum	
Parmaptera	P. permiana	Parmapteridae	Placed within its own monotypic family	
Pectinokhosara	P. sylvardembiodes	Megakhosaridae	Has elongated wings	
Permedax	P. effertus	Tillyardembiidae	Differs from all other known grylloblattid nymphs by its elongate body, but this is also a character of adult tillyardembiids	
Permula	P. tshekardensis, P. minor	Permulidae	Formerly placed within Sojanopermula, with Permula itself being a replacement name for Allicula.	
Permoshurabia	P. kungurica	Geinitziidae	One of the earliest geinitziids	
Permostriga	P. augustalis	Idelinellidae		
Pseudosheimia	P. caudata	Sheimiidae	Has longer cerci than Sheimia	
Scutistriga	S. scutata	Idelinellidae	Named after its shield-like pronotum	
Sheimia	S. tshekardensis	Sheimiidae	Bears larger eyes than other Sheimia species	
Strigulla	S. cuculiophoris	Idelinellidae	Formerly placed within Euryptilon	
Suksunus	S. bicodex	Cacurgidae	Similar to Kochopteron	
Sylvaclinicus	S. echinatus	Grylloblattida incertae sedis	Only known from nymphs	
Sylvafossor	S. forcipatus	Probnidae	Has unusual earwig-like cerci	
Sylvamicropteron	S. harpax	Grylloblattida incertae sedis	An unusual micropterous grylloblattid	
Sylvaphlebia	S. tuberculata, S. fucata	Sylvaphlebiidae	Has a pigmented wing strip	
Sylvaprisca	S. gravis, S. forta, S. focaleata	Lemmatophoridae	Named after the lemmatophorid genus Paraprisca	
Sylvardembia	S. matura, S. tamaena	Sylvardembiidae		
Sylvastriga	S. miranda	Idelinellidae		
Sylvictor	S. major	Liomopteridae	One of the largest notopterans from Koshelevka	
Sylviodes	S. perloides	Mesorthopteridae	Formerly placed in Ideliidae	
Sylvonympha	S. tshekardensis	Grylloblattida incertae sedis	Unusually for a grylloblattid, the larva has gills	
Sylvophenoptera	S. perlongata, S. fimbriata	Sylvaphlebiidae	Resembles Phenopterum but has a longer ovipositor	
Tillyardembia	T. antennaeplana, T. ravisedorum	Tillyardembiidae	Most common insects from Koshelevka alongside the earliest insects with preserved pollen attached to them	
Tshekardanympha	T. lienterica, T. bardensis	Grylloblattida incertae sedis	Split from Tshekardites	
Tshekardeigma	T. rasnitsyni	Epideigmatidae		
Tshekardelia	T. media	Ideliidae	One of the first ideliids known from a well-preserved body	
Tshekardites	T. comitialis	Grylloblattida incertae sedis	First established as a nymphal form taxon, before all other species were split out	
Tshekardomina	T. maculatus, T. imbecilla, T. imbecillissima, T. subincurvata	Tshekardominidae (Grylloblattida)	Type specimen preserves several eggs inside the abdomen, rest of specimens are all female (possibly suggesting flightless males?)	
Tshekardophlebia	T. capitata	Sylvaphlebiidae	Resembles Sylvaphlebia but has a larger head	
Tshekardushka	T. artenatis	Reculida incertae sedis	Only known from a nymph. Preserves an oval impression, likely representing a bolus of inorganic material	
Uralioma	U. maxima	Liomopteridae	Incompletely preserved, may belong to a separate genus	
Uraloprisca	U. uralica	Lemmatophoridae	Formerly included in Paraprisca	
Visherifera	V. sylvaensis	Visheriferidae	Originally described from a late Permian locality in the Solikamsk Formation	

=== Glosselytrodea ===
Glosselytrodeans
Genus	Species	Higher taxon	Notes	Images
Glossopterum	G. martynovae, G. sharovi	Glossopteridae		
Sylvaelytron	S. latipennatum	Permoberothidae		

== Misc. Arthropoda ==
Miscellaneous arthropods
Genus	Species	Higher taxon	Notes	Images
Permarachne	P. novokshonovi	Uraraneida	Previously identified as a spider	
Permocrassacus	P. novokshonovi	Scolopendromorpha	First described Permian centipede	

== Plants ==
=== Seed plants ===
==== Conifers ====
Conifers
Genus	Species	Higher taxon	Notes	Images
Cyparissidium	C. appressum	Voltziales	Formerly placed within Walchia	
Kungurodendron	K. sharovii	Voltziales	Similar to Walchia, although differs in having seed stalks	
Taxodiella	T. bardaeana	Voltziales	Formerly placed within Walchia, synonymous with several species	
