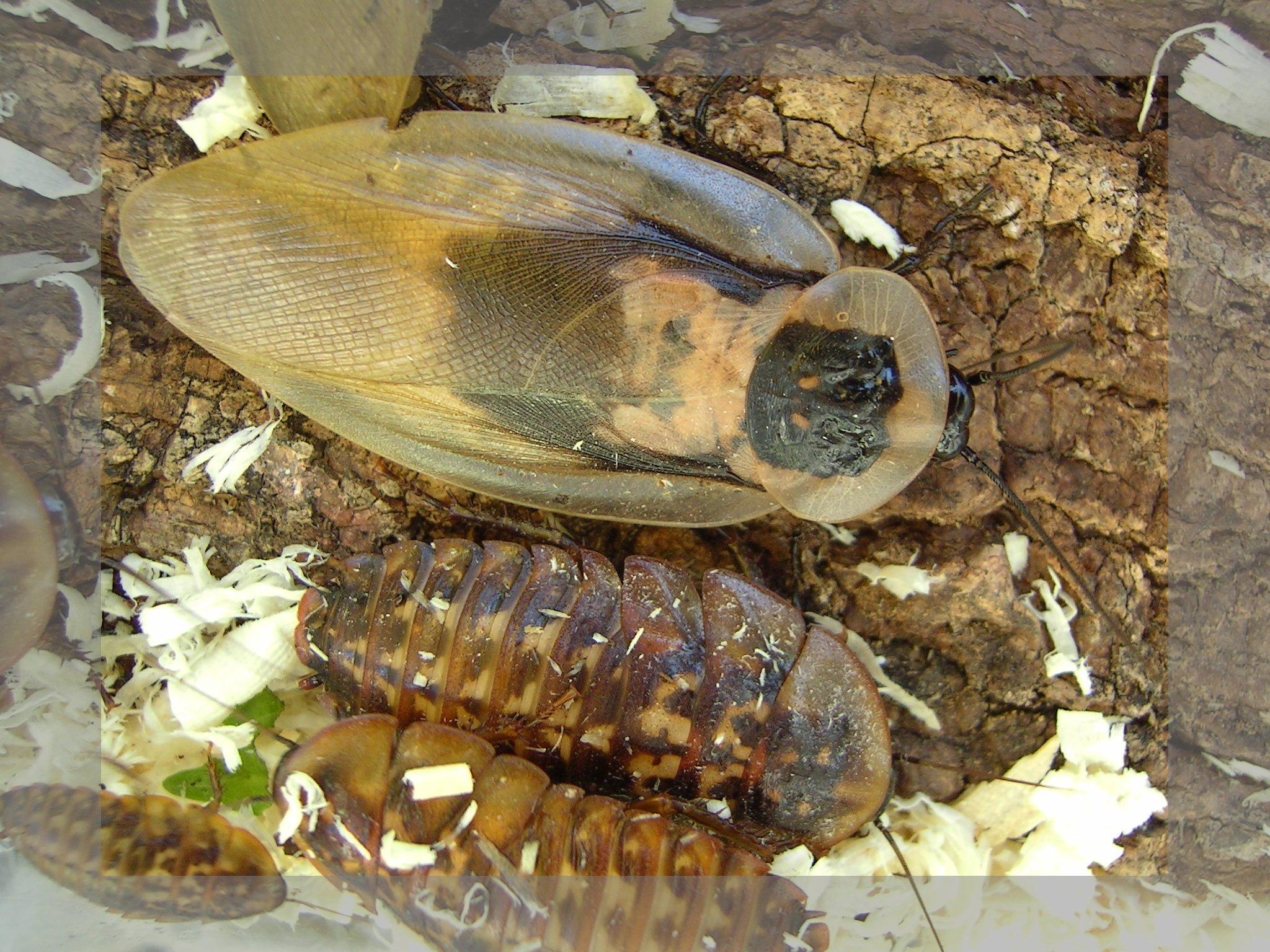
- Death's head cockroach or brown-winged Blaberus hybrid. Adult (above) and two immatures (note wing stubs)

Scientific classification
- Kingdom: Animalia
- Phylum: Arthropoda
- Class: Insecta
- Infraclass: Neoptera
- Superorder: Exopterygota

Orders
- Grylloblattodea (ice-crawlers); Mantophasmatodea (gladiators); Plecoptera (stoneflies); Embioptera (webspinners); Zoraptera (angel insects); Dermaptera (earwigs); Orthoptera (grasshoppers, etc); Phasmatodea (stick insects); Blattodea (cockroaches and termites); Mantodea (mantids); Psocoptera (booklice, barklice); Thysanoptera (thrips); Phthiraptera (lice); Hemiptera (true bugs); For extinct groups and possible future splits, see text.

= Exopterygota =

Exopterygota Temporal range: Carboniferous–Recent

Superorder of insects

The Exopterygota (Ancient Greek ἔξω (éxō, "outside") + πτερόν (pterón, "wing") + Neo-Latin -ota ("having")), also known as Hemimetabola, are a superorder of insects of the subclass Pterygota in the infraclass Neoptera, in which the young resemble adults but have externally developing wings. They undergo a modest change between immature and adult, without going through a pupal stage. The nymphs develop gradually into adults through a process of moulting.

The Exopterygota are a highly diverse insect superorder, with at least 130,000 living species divided between 15 orders. They include cockroaches, termites, grasshoppers, thrips, lice and stick insects, among many other types of insects.

Exopterygota are distinguished from the Endopterygota (or Holometabola) by the way their wings develop. Endopterygota (meaning literally "internal winged forms") develop wings inside the body and undergo an elaborate metamorphosis involving a pupal stage. Exopterygota ("external winged forms") develop wings on the outside of their bodies without going through a true pupal stage, though a few have something resembling a pupa (e.g., Aleyrodidae).

Ephemeroptera (mayflies) and Odonata (dragonflies and damselflies) also have gradual wing development, this being a plesiomorphic trait. These two orders belong to the infraclass Palaeoptera however, which is not included in Neoptera. As opposed to Neoptera, they cannot fold their wings over their back in the horizontal plane, only vertically (as damselflies do) if at all.

== Systematics ==
Traditionally Exopterygota included all neopterans that show incomplete metamorphosis. More recently, there is increasing debate about how to subdivide the Exopterygota, and the Neoptera in general. It is realized that some presumed Exopterygota may in fact be basal neopterans, making the superorder paraphyletic.

Here is a complete list of living and extinct orders of "exopterygotes", with some proposed subdivisions:

Superorder Exopterygota sensu stricto

- Polyneoptera
  - Caloneurodea †(extinct)
  - Titanoptera †(extinct)
  - Protorthoptera †(extinct)
  - Plecoptera (stoneflies)
  - Embioptera (webspinners)
  - Zoraptera (angel insects)
  - Dermaptera (earwigs)
  - Orthoptera (grasshoppers, etc.)
  - Phasmatodea (stick insects – tentatively placed here)
  - Grylloblattodea (ice-crawlers – tentatively placed here)
  - Mantophasmatodea (gladiators – tentatively placed here)
  - Superorder Dictyoptera
    - Blattodea (cockroaches and termites)
    - Mantodea (mantises)
    - Alienoptera †(extinct)
- Superorder Paraneoptera
  - Psocoptera (booklice, barklice)
  - Thysanoptera (thrips)
  - Phthiraptera (lice)
  - Hemiptera (true bugs)
