= B. giganteus =

B. giganteus may refer to:

- Bathynomus giganteus, the giant isopod, the largest known isopod species
- Blaberus giganteus, the giant cockroach, one of the world's longest roach species
- Brachystephanus giganteus, a plant species found in Cameroon and Equatorial Guinea
- Burhinus giganteus, a large shorebird widespread around coasts from the Andaman Islands to Australia
