= Polyorthoptera =

Polyorthoptera is an outdated(?) magnorder of insects within the cohort polyneoptera that includes Dermaptera Grylloblattodea Mantophasmatodea Phasmatodea and Orthoptera. It is also sometimes used as a synonym for the Polyneoptera in general.
