= Brachystephanus (disambiguation) =

Brachystephanus may refer to:

- Brachystephanus, a genus of plants in the family Acanthaceae
- Brachystephanus (mammal), a genus of notoungulates in the family Oldfieldthomasiidae
- Antepithecus brachystephanus, a species of notoungulates in the family Interatheriidae from the Eocene of South America
