= Z. grandis =

Z. grandis may refer to:

- Zaprionus grandis, a fruit fly species in the genus Zaprionus
- Zdenekia grandis, a prehistoric winged insect species from the Czech Republic
- Zeuxine grandis, an orchid species in the genus Zeuxine

== See also ==
- Grandis (disambiguation)
