= Bajanzhargalanidae =

Bajanzhargalanidae Temporal range: Kungurian–Jurassic

Scientific classification
- Kingdom: Animalia
- Phylum: Arthropoda
- Class: Insecta
- Cohort: Polyneoptera
- Superorder: Notoptera
- Order: Grylloblattodea
- Family: †Bajanzhargalanidae; Storozhenko, 1992

Extinct family of insects

Bajanzhargalanidae is an extinct family of winged polyneopteran insects, recorded from the Permian and Jurassic but not the Triassic. They are considered poorly known members of the "Grylloblattida", a poorly defined group of extinct insects thought to be related to modern ice crawlers (Grylloblattidae). There are at least four genera and about seven described species in Bajanzhargalanidae.

== Genera ==
These four genera belong to the family Bajanzhargalanidae:

- † Bajanzhargalana Storozhenko, 1988 Ulaan-Ereg Formation, Mongolia, Late Jurassic (Tithonian)
- † Nele Ansorge, 1996 Grimmen locality, Germany, Early Jurassic (Toarcian)
- † Sinonele Cui, Béthoux, Klass & Ren, 2015 Daohugou Formation, China, Middle/Late Jurassic (Callovian/Oxfordian)
- (?) † Sylvafossor Aristov, 2004 Koshelevka Formation, Russia, Early Permian (Kungurian)
