= Geinitzia (insect) =

Geinitzia Temporal range: Permian-Jurassic ~272.5–155.7 Ma

Scientific classification
- Kingdom: Animalia
- Phylum: Arthropoda
- Class: Insecta
- Order: †Reculida
- Family: †Geinitziidae
- Genus: †Geinitzia; Handlirsch 1906

Species
- See text

Synonyms
- Ominea Fujiyama, 1973

Extinct genus of insect

Geinitzia is an extinct genus of flying insects belonging to the order Reculida and family Geinitziidae. Species belonging to the genus lived from the Permian to the Jurassic and have been found in China, Germany, Kyrgyzstan, the United Kingdom, Japan, and Russia.

== Species ==
A number of species have been described in Geinitzia.

G. annosa (Aristov, 2004) – Maltsevo Formation, Early Triassic (Griesbachian), Russia
G. aristovi Cui et al., 2012 – Jiulongshan Formation, Middle-Late Jurassic (Callovian-Oxfordian), China
G. asiatica Storozhenko, 1990 – Sagul Formation, Early Jurassic (Toarcian), Kyrgyzstan
G. carpentieri Zeuner, 1937 – Dumbleton, Gloucestershire, Early Jurassic (Toarcian), United Kingdom
G. dorni Bode, 1953 – Posidonia Shale Formation, Early Jurassic (Toarcian), Germany
G. fasciata (Bode, 1905) – Posidonia Shale Formation, Early Jurassic (Toarcian), Germany
G. ima Aristov, 2015 – Iva-Gora Beds Formation, Middle Permian (Roadian), Russia
G. latrunculorum Bode, 1953 – Posidonia Shale Formation, Early Jurassic (Toarcian), Germany
G. minor Handlirsch, 1906 – Dobbertin, Mecklenburg, Early Jurassic (Toarcian), Germany
G. perlaesa Bode, 1953 – Posidonia Shale Formation, Early Jurassic (Toarcian), Germany
G. reticulata (Fujiyama, 1973) – Momonoki Formation, Late Triassic (Carnian), Japan
G. sagulensis Aristov et al., 2009 – Sagul Formation, Early Jurassic (Toarcian), Kyrgyzstan
G. schlieffeni (Geinitz, 1884) – Dobbertin, Mecklenburg, Early Jurassic (Toarcian), Germany
G. subita Aristov, 2013 – Poldarsa Formation, Late Permian (Wuchiapingian), Russia
G. superaucta Bode, 1953 – Posidonia Shale Formation, Early Jurassic (Toarcian), Germany
G. varia Bode, 1953 – Posidonia Shale Formation, Early Jurassic (Toarcian), Germany
