= Madygenophlebiidae =

Madygenophlebiidae Temporal range: Carnian

Scientific classification
- Kingdom: Animalia
- Phylum: Arthropoda
- Class: Insecta
- Cohort: Polyneoptera
- Superorder: Notoptera
- Order: Grylloblattodea
- Family: †Madygenophlebiidae; Storozhenko, 1992

Extinct family of insects

Madygenophlebiidae is an extinct family of rock crawlers in the order Grylloblattodea. There are at least two genera and four described species in Madygenophlebiidae.

== Genera ==
These two genera belong to the family Madygenophlebiidae:

- † Madygenophlebia Storozhenko, 1992
- † Micromadygenophlebia Storozhenko, 1992
