= Rasstriga =

Scientific classification
- Kingdom: Animalia
- Phylum: Arthropoda
- Class: Insecta
- Order: Grylloblattodea
- Family: †Idelinellidae
- Genus: †Rasstriga; D. S. Aristov & A. P. Rasnitsyn, 2012

Species
- R. americana

Extinct genus of insects

Rasstriga is an extinct genus of insects. It existed in what is now Illinois, U.S.A. during the Pennsylvanian subperiod. It was described by D. S. Aristov and A. P. Rasnitsyn in 2012, and the type species is R. americana. Its body measured 22.5 millimetres in length, while its forewings were about 23 millimetres. It is currently placed in the family Idelinellidae, although its placement is uncertain.
