= Idelinellidae =

Idelinellidae Temporal range: Permian

Scientific classification
- Kingdom: Animalia
- Phylum: Arthropoda
- Class: Insecta
- Order: Grylloblattodea
- Infraorder: Grylloblattina
- Family: †Idelinellidae; Storozhenko, 1997

Genera
- See text.

Exctint family of insects

Idelinellidae is an extinct family of insects from the Permian and possibly the Late Carboniferous. They closely resemble members of the family Stenoneuridae.

== Classification history ==
Idelinellidae was originally established by Storozhenko (1997) to house the genus Idelinella (described from a fossil preserving only a fragment of a forewing), which had previously been included in the family Ideliidae. Idelinellidae itself was classified in the suborder Grylloblattina of the order Grylloblattida (including extant Grylloblattidae as well as many extinct families). In 2004, Aristov transferred the genus Permostriga from Kortshakoliidae to Idelinellidae and described Sylvastriga from the Tshekarda locality in the Koshelevka Formation. In 2012, Aristov and Rasnitsyn transferred the family to the order Eoblattida, and revised the family to include five more genera. Aristov later transferred the genus Permeoblatta to the family Protophasmatidae in 2015. Cui et al. (2024) consider most members of the family as representatives of the total group of Xenonomia (except Rasstriga), though the authors avoided using family names in their data set.

== Included genera and species ==
The family consists of the following genera and species:

- Idelinella Storozhenko, 1992 – Soyana, Iva-Gora Beds Formation, Russia, Middle Permian (Roadian)
  - Idelinella macroptera Storozhenko, 1992 (known from a forewing fragment)
- Permostriga Novokshonov, 1999 – Tshekarda/Chekarda, Koshelevka Formation, Russia, Early Permian (Kungurian); Soyana, Iva-Gora Beds Formation, Russia, Middle Permian (Roadian)
  - Permostriga augustalis Novokshonov, 1999 (known from forewings and a complete body)
- Sylvastriga Aristov, 2004 – Tshekarda/Chekarda, Koshelevka Formation, Russia, Early Permian (Kungurian)
  - Sylvastriga miranda Aristov, 2004 (known from forewing fragment)
- Strigulla Aristov & Rasnitsyn, 2012 – Tshekarda/Chekarda, Koshelevka Formation, Russia, Early Permian (Kungurian)
  - Strigulla cuculiophora (Aristov, 2002) (= Euryptilon cuculiophoris Aristov, 2002) (known from complete body)
- Cucullistriga Aristov & Rasnitsyn, 2012 – Tshekarda/Chekarda, Koshelevka Formation, Russia, Early Permian (Kungurian)
  - Cucullistriga cucullata Aristov & Rasnitsyn, 2012 (known from complete body)
- Scutistriga Aristov & Rasnitsyn, 2012 – Tshekarda/Chekarda, Koshelevka Formation, Russia, Early Permian (Kungurian)
  - Scutistriga scutata Aristov & Rasnitsyn, 2012 (known from complete body)
- ?Rasstriga Aristov & Rasnitsyn, 2012 – Mazon Creek, Carbondale Formation, United States, Late Carboniferous (Desmoinesian); tentatively included in the family
  - ?Rasstriga americana Aristov & Rasnitsyn, 2012 (known from incomplete body)

Permeoblatta Rasnitsyn & Aristov, 2010 (including the species Permeoblatta borealis Rasnitsyn & Aristov, 2010) from the Late Permian (Wuchiapingian)-aged Poldarsa Formation of Russia was formerly included in the family until 2015, when it was transferred to the family Protophasmatidae.
