= Scutistriga =

Scientific classification
- Kingdom: Animalia
- Phylum: Arthropoda
- Class: Insecta
- Order: Grylloblattodea
- Family: †Idelinellidae
- Genus: †Scutistriga; D. S. Aristov & A. P. Rasnitsyn, 2012

Species
- S. scutata

Extinct genus of insects

Scutistriga is an extinct genus of insects in the family Idelinellidae. It existed in what is now Russia during the Kungurian age. It was described by D. S. Aristov and A. P. Rasnitsyn in 2012, and the type species is S. scutata. The body measured about 10.5 millimetres, while the forewings measured about 12 millimetres, and the hindwings about 10 millimetres. The species' fossils were discovered in the Ural Mountains.
