= Strigulla =

Scientific classification
- Kingdom: Animalia
- Phylum: Arthropoda
- Clade: Pancrustacea
- Class: Insecta
- Order: Grylloblattodea
- Infraorder: Grylloblattina
- Family: †Idelinellidae
- Genus: †Strigulla; D. S. Aristov & A. P. Rasnitsyn, 2012

Species
- S. cuculiophora

Extinct genus of insects

Strigulla is an extinct genus of insects in the family Idelinellidae. It existed in what is now Russia during the Kungurian age. It was described by D. S. Aristov and A. P. Rasnitsyn in 2012, as a new genus for the species Euryptilon cuculiophoris. S. cuculiophora measured 10 millimetres in body length, with the forewings having about the same measurement.
