= Gorochoviidae =

Gorochoviidae Temporal range: Carnian

Scientific classification
- Kingdom: Animalia
- Phylum: Arthropoda
- Class: Insecta
- Cohort: Polyneoptera
- Clade: Notoptera
- Order: Grylloblattodea
- Family: †Gorochoviidae; Storozhenko, 1994

Extinct family of insects

Gorochoviidae is an extinct family of rock crawlers in the order Grylloblattodea. There are at least three genera and about eight described species in Gorochoviidae.

== Genera ==
These three genera belong to the family Gorochoviidae:

- † Gorochovia Storozhenko, 1994
- † Gorochoviella Storozhenko, 1994
- † Pseudoliomopterites Storozhenko, 1994
