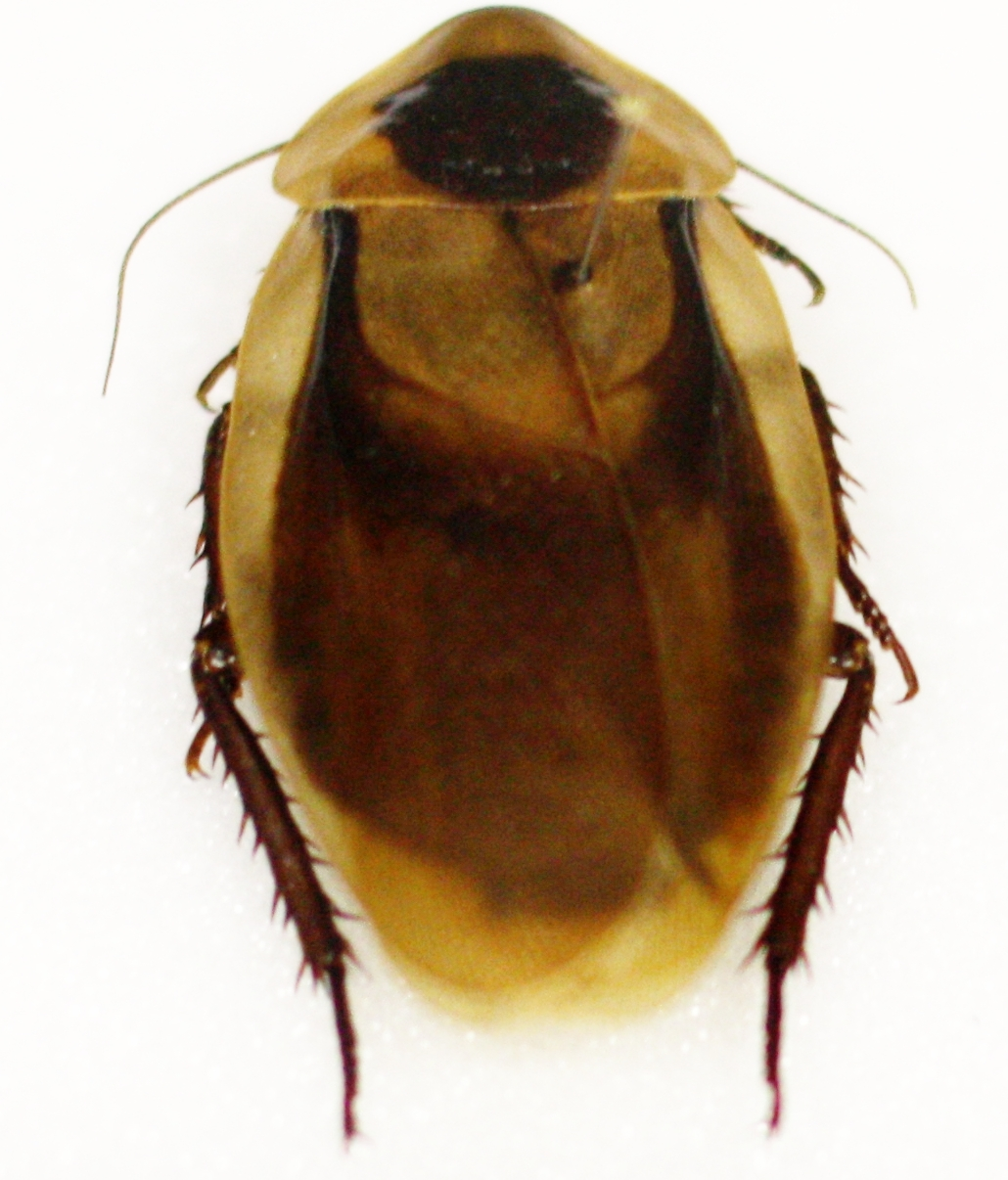

Scientific classification
- Kingdom: Animalia
- Phylum: Arthropoda
- Clade: Pancrustacea
- Class: Insecta
- Order: Blattodea
- Family: Blaberidae
- Genus: Blaberus
- Species: B. discoidalis

Binomial name
- Blaberus discoidalis Audinet-Serville, 1839

Synonyms
- Blabera rufescens Saussure & Zhentner, 1894; Blabera subspurcata Walker, F, 1868; Blabera varians Serville, 1838; Blabera cubensis Saussure, 1864; Blabera discoidalis Serville, 1838

= Blaberus discoidalis =

Discoid cockroach

Species of cockroach

Blaberus discoidalis, commonly known as the discoid cockroach, tropical cockroach, West Indian leaf cockroach, false death's head cockroach, Haitian cockroach, and drummer, is a cockroach native to Central America of the "giant cockroach" family, Blaberidae.

The adult is around 35–45 mm (1.4–1.8 in) in length, and is tan with a dark brown to black patch on its pronotum. The juvenile is brown with tan speckles, and matures to adulthood in 4–5 months. Adults have wings but are not active fliers, and they can not climb smooth vertical surfaces, simplifying their care in captivity.

Blaberus discoidalis is called the false death's head cockroach because of its superficial resemblance to the death's head cockroach, Blaberus craniifer.

== Distribution ==
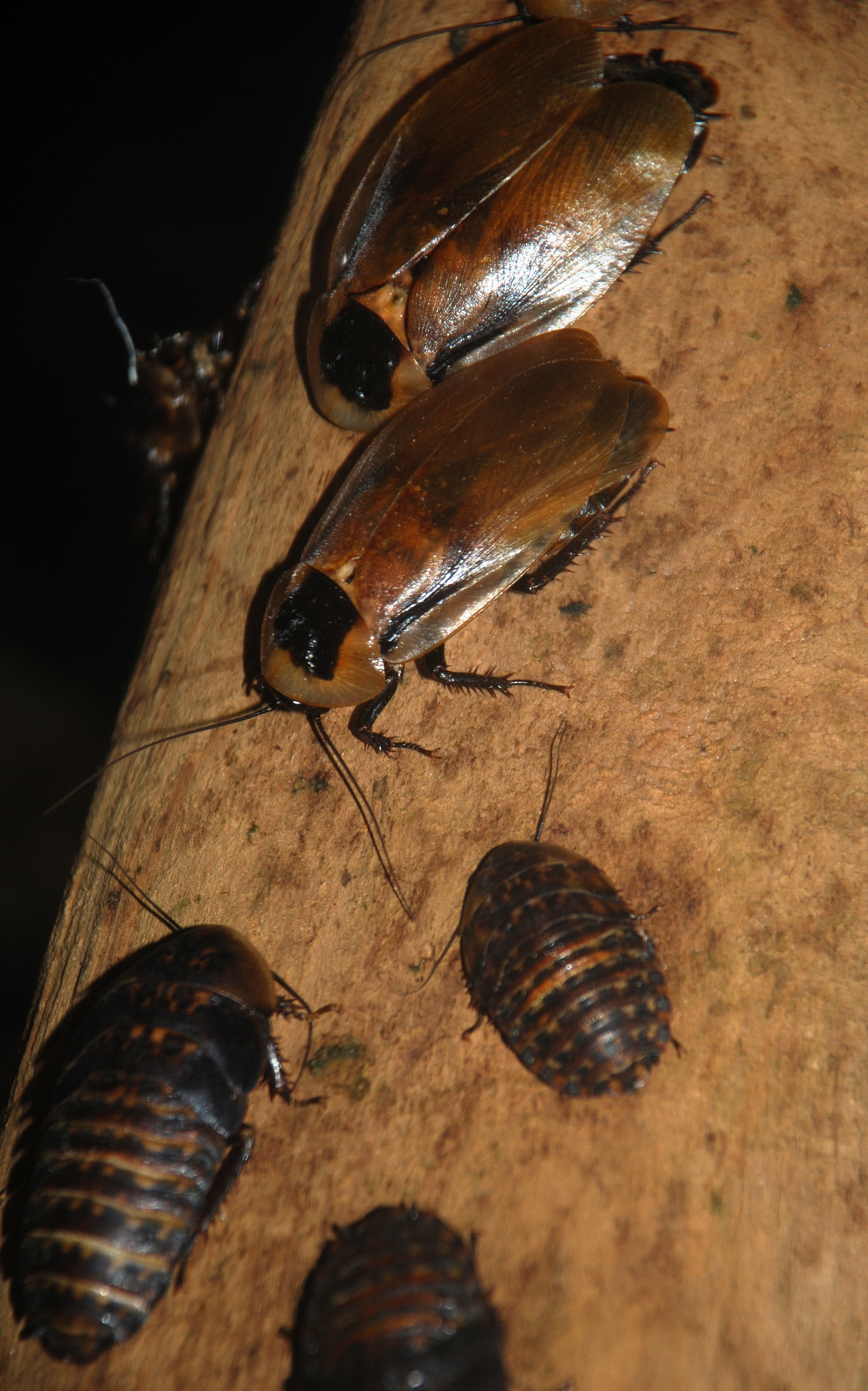
Adult and juvenile specimens at Smithsonian National Zoological Park

Blaberus discoidalis is found in Jamaica, Cuba, Hispaniola, Puerto Rico, Puerto Rico (Vieques Island), Panama, Colombia, Venezuela, Trinidad and Tobago, and Florida.

== Locomotion ==
The movement of B. discoidalis runs relatively inefficiently – wasting movement as it runs. It can move about 25 of its body lengths per second, around half the speed of common cockroach Periplaneta americana. In laboratory tests, B. discoidalis cockroaches were adept at obstacle climbing, and maintaining stability with miniature "cannons" strapped to their bodies designed to knock them off balance mid-run. The species served as the basis for the kinematics design of several cockroach-inspired robots.

== Uses ==
=== Pet food ===
They are very easy to raise in captivity, so make good feed for insectivorous pets such as tarantulas, bearded dragons, and other lizards.

These animals breed readily in captivity. They reach breeding age in about 6 months if kept warm, with 85–90 °F recommended for more productive breeding. Females carry their eggs inside a brooding pouch having genital chamber and vestibulum until they are fertilised by male spermatophore.

=== Insect eating competitions ===
Discoid cockroaches are also used in insect eating competitions since they are often raised in captivity and are easier to gather in large numbers during a contest. In 2012, Edward Archibold died as a result of 'asphyxia due to choking and aspiration of gastric contents,' according to his autopsy report, in a cockroach eating contest in south Florida.

=== Fuel cell ===
Blaberus discoidalis was used in an experiment to create a miniature fuel cell, producing electricity from naturally occurring sugar in the insect and oxygen in the air. The power density of the species is considered a good design target for small robots.

== Image gallery ==
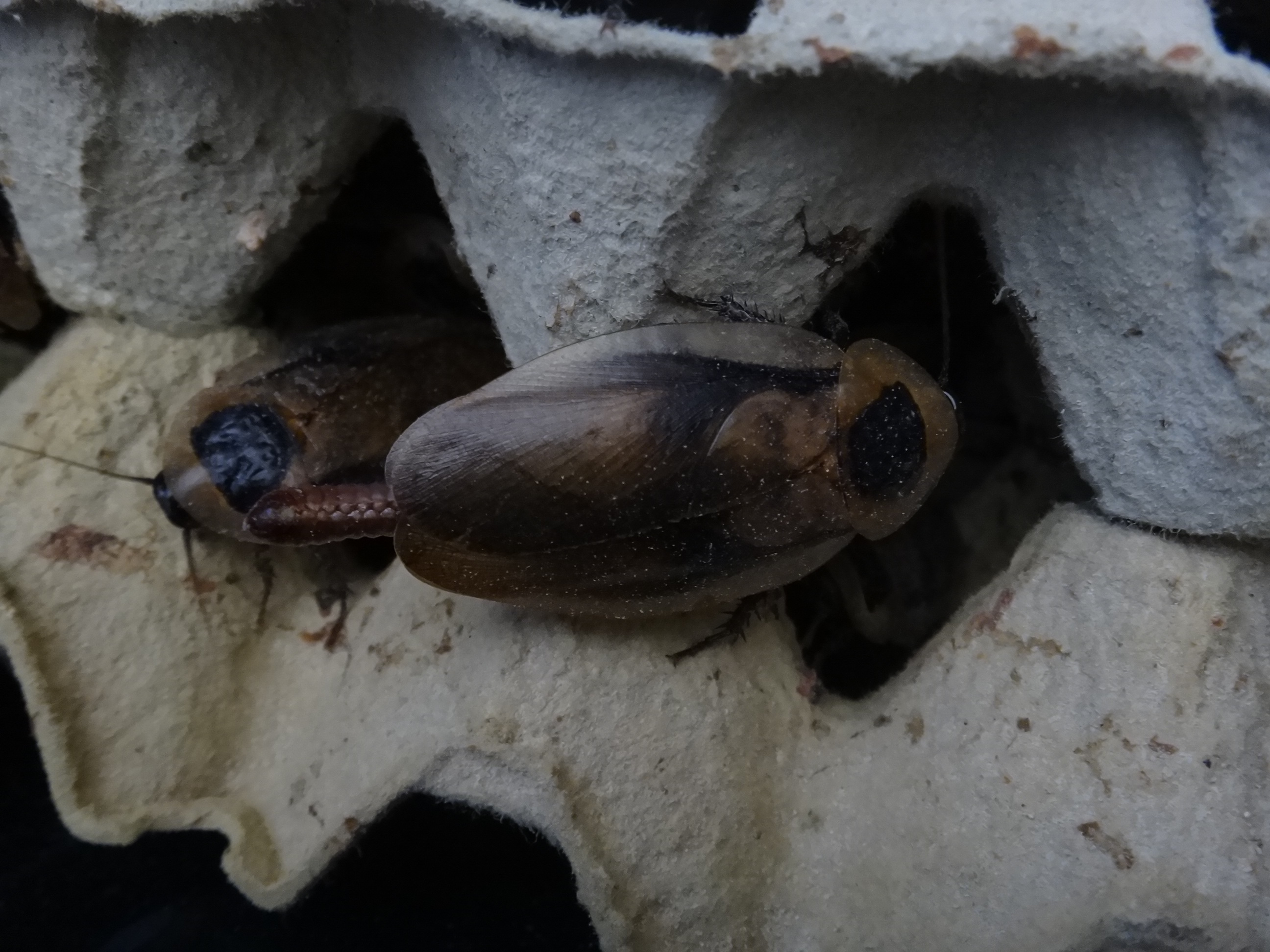
Female with ootheca

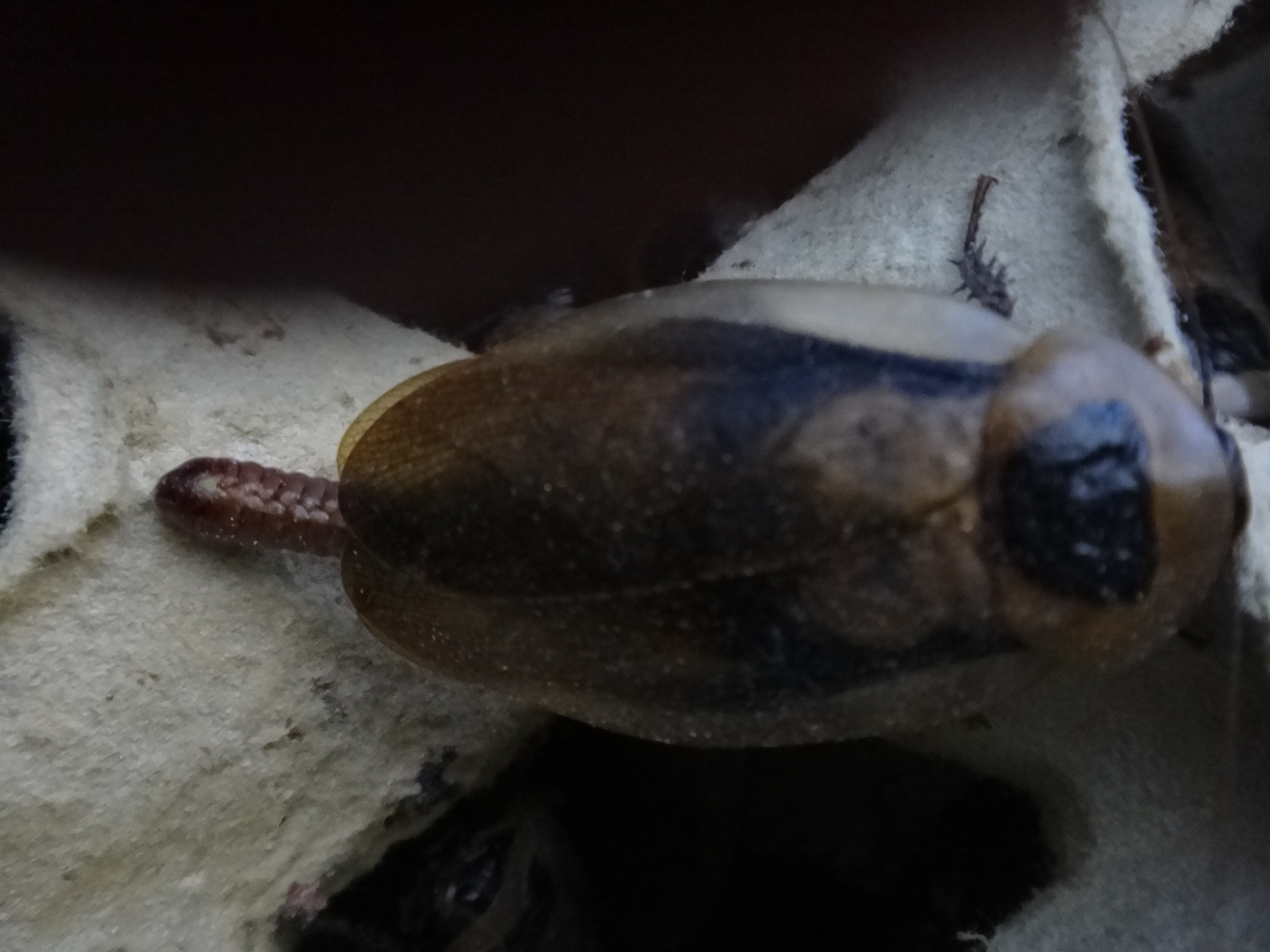
Female with ootheca before hatching

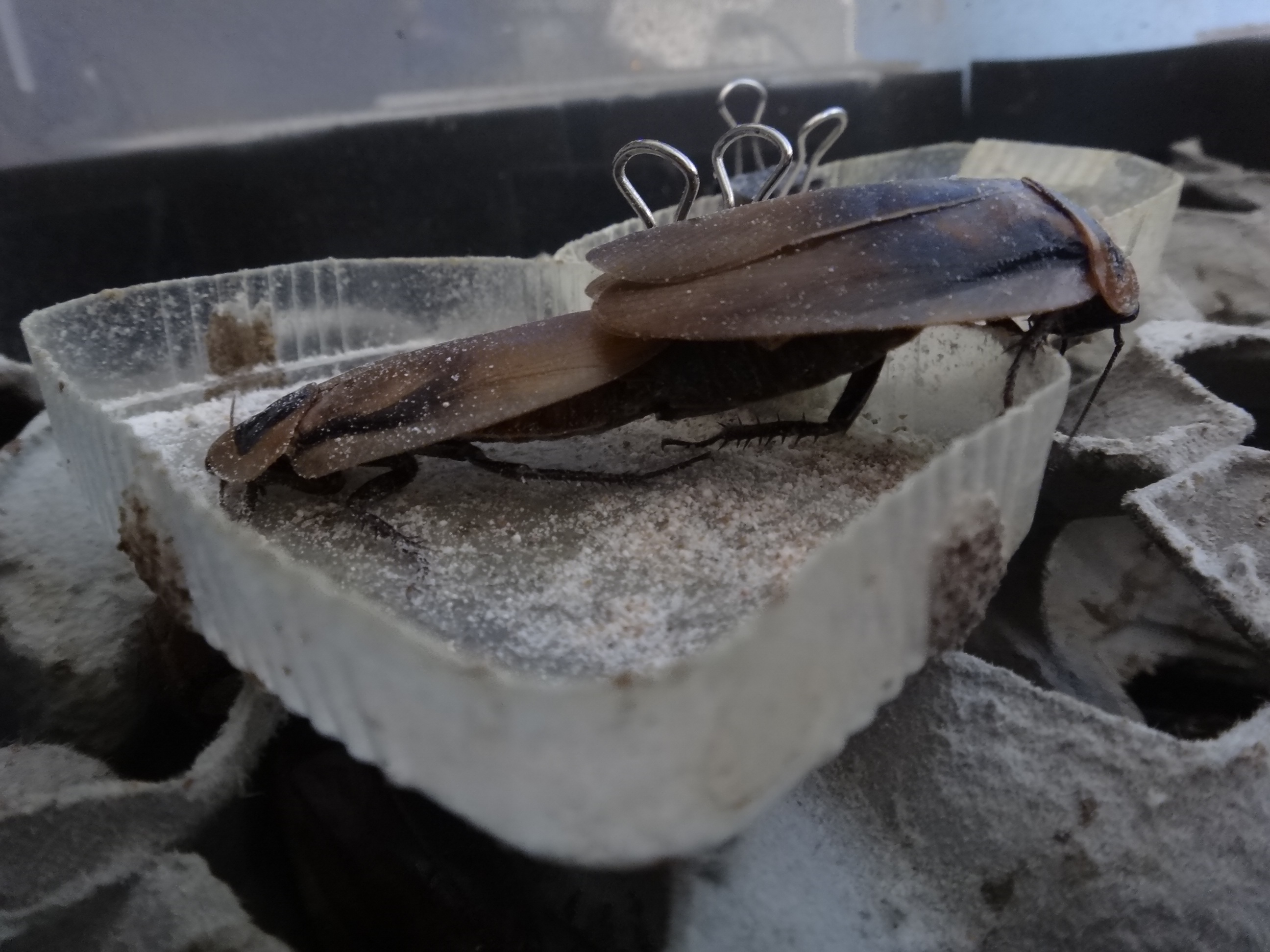
Mating (male on the left)
