= Brachystephanus longiflorus =

Conservation status
- Vulnerable (IUCN 3.1)

Scientific classification
- Kingdom: Plantae
- Clade: Tracheophytes
- Clade: Angiosperms
- Clade: Eudicots
- Clade: Asterids
- Order: Lamiales
- Family: Acanthaceae
- Genus: Brachystephanus
- Species: B. longiflorus

Binomial name
- Brachystephanus longiflorus Lindau

Species of flowering plant

Brachystephanus longiflorus is a species of plant in the family Acanthaceae. It is found in Cameroon, Equatorial Guinea, and Nigeria. Its natural habitats are moist lowland or montane forests in subtropical or tropical regions.
