= Cucullistriga =

Scientific classification
- Kingdom: Animalia
- Phylum: Arthropoda
- Class: Insecta
- Order: Grylloblattodea
- Family: †Idelinellidae
- Genus: †Cucullistriga; D. S. Aristov & A. P. Rasnitsyn, 2012

Species
- C. cucullata

Extinct genus of insects

Cucullistriga is an extinct genus of insects in the family Idelinellidae. It existed in what is now Russia during the Kungurian age. It was described by D. S. Aristov and A. P. Rasnitsyn in 2012, and the type species is C. cucullata. The body measured about 11.4 millimetres, while the forewings were about 10.8 millimetres.
