= Geinitziidae =

Geinitziidae Temporal range: Kungurian–Early Cretaceous

Scientific classification
- Kingdom: Animalia
- Phylum: Arthropoda
- Class: Insecta
- Order: †Reculida
- Family: †Geinitziidae; Handlirsch, 1906

Genera
- See text

Extinct family of insects

Geinitziidae is an extinct family of polyneopteran insects, known from the Permian to Cretaceous. They are currently considered to be members "Grylloblattida" a poorly defined group of extinct insects thought to be related to modern ice crawlers (Grylloblattidae). Other authors place them in the extinct order Reculida. Unlike modern ice crawlers, which are wingless, they had large wings, bearing a superficial resemblance to cockroaches, and are thought to have been day-active above ground predators.

== Taxonomy ==
After

- †Fletchitzia Riek 1976 – Molteno Formation, South Africa, Lesotho, Late Triassic (Carnian)
- †Geinitzia Handlirsch 1906 – Iva-Gora Beds Formation, Russia, Middle Permian (Roadian); Poldarsa Formation, Russia, Late Permian (Wuchiapingian); Mal'tseva Formation, Russia, Late Permian (Changhsingian); Sagul Formation, Kyrgyzstan, Lias Group, England; Posidonia Shale, Green Series, Germany, Early Jurassic (Toarcian); Daohugou, China, Middle Jurassic (Callovian)
- †Permoshurabia Aristov 2009 – Lek-Vorkuta Formation, Koshelevka Formation, Russia, Early Permian (Kungurian); Iva-Gora Beds Formation, Russia, Middle Permian (Roadian); Mal'tseva Formation, Russia, Late Permian (Changhsingian); Potrerillos Formation, Argentina, Late Triassic (Carnian)
- †Permovalia Aristov 2015 – Belebeevo Formation, Russia, Middle Permian (Roadian)
- †Permuliercula Aristov 2020 – Mal'tseva Formation, Russia, Late Permian (Changhsingian)
- †Prosepididontus Handlirsch 1920 – Green Series, Germany, Early Jurassic (Toarcian)
- †Roemerula Bode 1953 – Posidonia Shale, Germany, Early Jurassic (Toarcian)
- †Sauk Aristov 2018 – Sauk-Tanga, Kyrgyzstan, Early Jurassic (Toarcian)
- †Say Aristov 2018 – Sagul Formation, Kyrgyzstan, Early Jurassic (Toarcian)
- †Shurabia Martynov 1937 – Iva-Gora Beds Formation, Russia, Roadian, Poldarsa Formation, Russia, Wuchiapingian; Khungtukun Formation, Russia, Changhsingian; Amisan Formation, South Korea, Late Triassic; Momonoki Formation, Japan, Late Triassic; Madygen Formation, Kyrgyzstan, Late Triassic; Molteno Formation, South Africa, Carnian; Mount Crosby Insect Bed, Australia, Late Triassic (Norian); Kugitang Formation, Taijikistan, Early Jurassic; Menkoushan Formation, China, Dzhil Formation, Kyrgyzstan, Early Jurassic (Sinemurian), Osinovo Formation, Cheremkhovskaya Formation, Russia, Sagul Formation, Sulyukta Formation Kyrgyzstan, Toarcian Daohugou, China, Callovian; Khasurty locality, Russia, Early Cretaceous (Neocomian)
- †Sinosepididontus Huang and Nel 2008 – Daohugou, China, Callovian; Shar-Teeg, Mongolia, Late Jurassic (Tithonian)
- †Stegopterum Sharov 1961 – Lek-Vorkuta Formation, Russia, Kungurian; Iva-Gora Beds Formation, Mitina Formation, Russia, Roadian; Kazankovo-Markinskaya Formation, Russia, Middle Permian (Wordian); Mal'tseva Formation, Russia, Changhsingian
- †Sukhonia Aristov 2013 – Poldarsa Formation, Russia, Wuchiapingian

A possible geinitziid, suggested to represent a specimen of Shurabia, is known from the mid Cretaceous (Albian-Cenomanian) Burmese amber of Myanmar.
