= Brachystephanus jaundensis subsp. nimbae =

Conservation status
- Vulnerable (IUCN 3.1)

Scientific classification
- Kingdom: Plantae
- Clade: Tracheophytes
- Clade: Angiosperms
- Clade: Eudicots
- Clade: Asterids
- Order: Lamiales
- Family: Acanthaceae
- Genus: Brachystephanus
- Species: B. jaundensis
- Subspecies: B. j. subsp. nimbae

Trinomial name
- Brachystephanus jaundensis subsp. nimbae (Heine) I.Darbysh. (2009)

Synonyms
- Brachystephanus nimbae Heine (1971 publ. 1972)

Species of flowering plant

Brachystephanus jaundensis subsp. nimbae is a subspecies of flowering plant in the family Acanthaceae. It is a subshrub or shrub native to Ivory Coast, Ghana, Guinea, and Liberia.
