= Palaeocixiidae =

Scientific classification
- Kingdom: Animalia
- Phylum: Arthropoda
- Class: Insecta
- Order: Grylloblattodea
- Family: †Palaeocixiidae; Handlirsch, 1919

Extinct family of insects

Palaeocixiidae is an extinct family of rock crawlers in the order Grylloblattodea. There is one genus, Palaeocixius, in Palaeocixiidae.
