= Darekia =

Darekia Temporal range: Westphalian Age, Carboniferous Period

Scientific classification
- Kingdom: Animalia
- Phylum: Arthropoda
- Class: Insecta
- Order: †Paoliida
- Family: †Paoliidae
- Genus: †Darekia; Prokop et al., 2012
- Species: †D. sanguinea

Binomial name
- †Darekia sanguinea Prokop et al., 2012

Extinct genus of insects

Darekia is an extinct genus of winged insects that existed in what is now Poland, during the upper Carboniferous period. It is a monotypic genus, including only the species Darekia sanguinea. Darekia is considered a member of the extinct order Paoliida, a group that historically had controversial affinities and composition but have been resolved as the sister group of Dictyoptera by recent studies. The genus and species were described by Jakub Prokop, Wieslaw Krzemiński, Ewa Krzemińska, and Dariusz Wojciechowski in 2012.
