= Protelytroptera =

- Protelytron permianum holotype

Scientific classification
- Kingdom: Animalia
- Phylum: Arthropoda
- Clade: Pancrustacea
- Class: Insecta
- Cohort: Polyneoptera
- Order: †Protelytroptera; Tillyard, 1931

Families
- Apachelytridae; Archelytridae; Bardocoleidae; Dermelytridae; Elytroneuridae; Labidelytridae; Megelytridae; Permelytridae; Permophilidae; Planelytridae; Protelytridae; Protocoleidae; Stephanastidae

Synonyms
- Protocoleoptera Tillyard, 1924; Paracoleoptera Laurentiaux, 1953; Skleroptera Kirejtshuk and Nel, 2013

Extinct order of earwigs

A phylogeny of Dermaptera and related groups

Protelytroptera is an extinct order of insects thought to be a stem group from which the modern Dermaptera evolved. These insects, which resemble modern Blattodea, or cockroaches, are known from the Permian of North America, Europe and Australia, from the fossils of their shell-like forewings and the large, unequal anal fan. None of their fossils are known from the Triassic, when the morphological changes from Protelytroptera to Dermaptera presumably took place.
