= Brachystephanus giganteus =

Conservation status
- Vulnerable (IUCN 3.1)

Scientific classification
- Kingdom: Plantae
- Clade: Tracheophytes
- Clade: Angiosperms
- Clade: Eudicots
- Clade: Asterids
- Order: Lamiales
- Family: Acanthaceae
- Genus: Brachystephanus
- Species: B. giganteus

Binomial name
- Brachystephanus giganteus Champl.

Species of flowering plant

Brachystephanus giganteus is a species of plant in the family Acanthaceae. It is found in Cameroon and Equatorial Guinea. Its natural habitat is subtropical or tropical moist montane forests.
