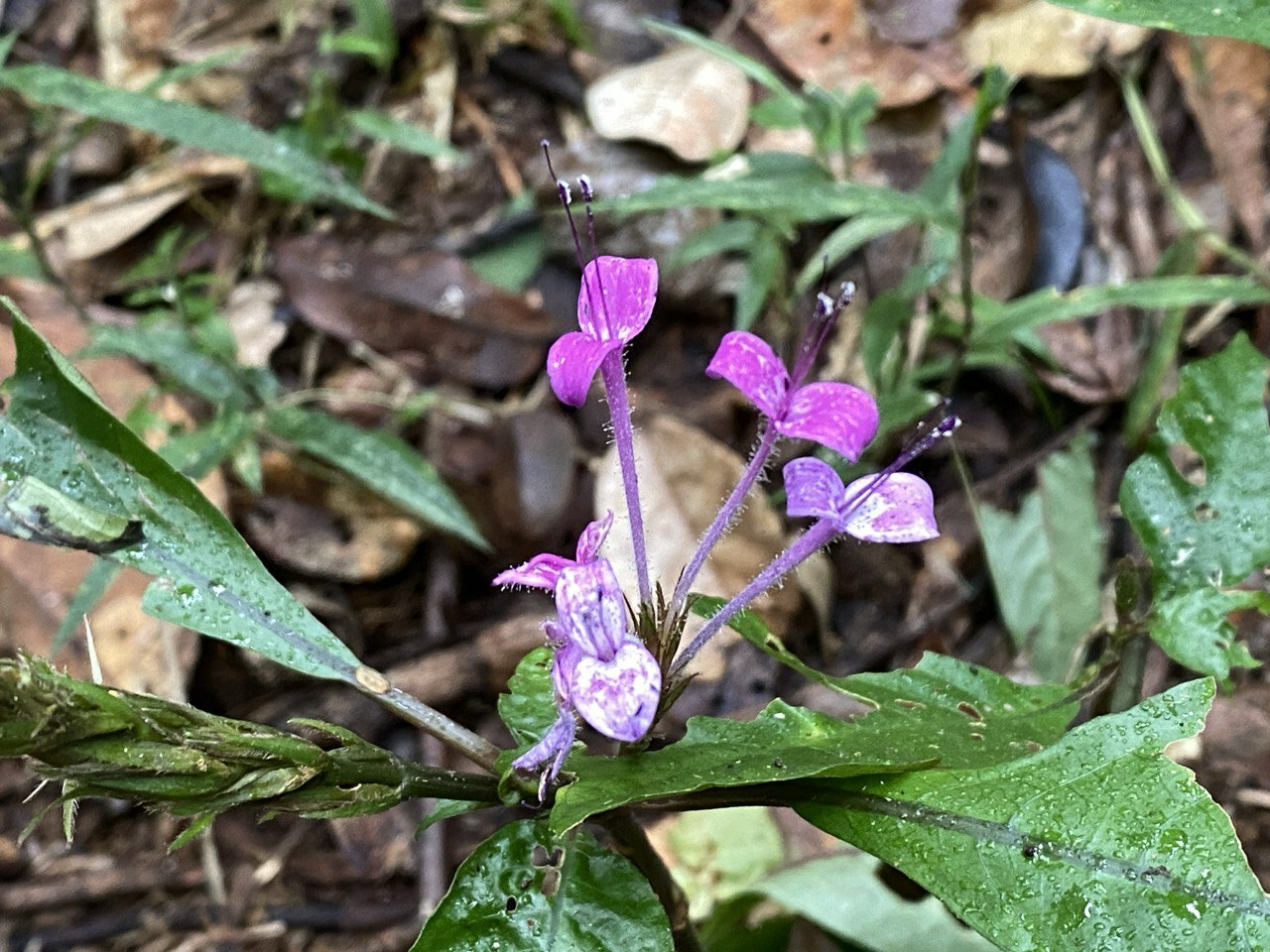
- Brachystephanus lyallii

Scientific classification
- Kingdom: Plantae
- Clade: Tracheophytes
- Clade: Angiosperms
- Clade: Eudicots
- Clade: Asterids
- Order: Lamiales
- Family: Acanthaceae
- Subfamily: Acanthoideae
- Tribe: Justicieae
- Genus: Brachystephanus; Nees (1847)

Synonyms
- Oreacanthus Benth. & Hook.f. (1876)

= Brachystephanus =

Genus of flowering plants

Brachystephanus is a genus of flowering plants in the family Acanthaceae. It includes 21 species native to tropical Africa and Madagascar.

== Species ==
21 species are accepted.

- Brachystephanus africanus S.Moore
- Brachystephanus calostachyus Champl.
- Brachystephanus coeruleus S.Moore
- Brachystephanus congensis Champl.
- Brachystephanus densiflorus E.Figueiredo
- Brachystephanus giganteus Champl.
- Brachystephanus glaberrimus Champl.
- Brachystephanus holstii Lindau
- Brachystephanus jaundensis Lindau
  - Brachystephanus jaundensis var. brevitubus I.Darbysh.
  - Brachystephanus jaundensis subsp. jaundensis
  - Brachystephanus jaundensis subsp. nemoralis (S.Moore) I.Darbysh.
  - Brachystephanus jaundensis subsp. nimbae (Heine) I.Darbysh. (syn. Brachystephanus nimbae Heine)
- Brachystephanus kupeensis Champl.
- Brachystephanus laxispicatus I.Darbysh.
- Brachystephanus longiflorus Lindau
- Brachystephanus lyallii Nees
- Brachystephanus mannii C.B.Clarke
- Brachystephanus montifuga (Milne-Redh.) Champl.
- Brachystephanus myrmecophilus Champl.
- Brachystephanus occidentalis Lindau
- Brachystephanus oreacanthus Champl.
- Brachystephanus roseus Champl.
- Brachystephanus schliebenii (Mildbr.) Champl.
- Brachystephanus sudanicus (Friis & Vollesen) Champl.
