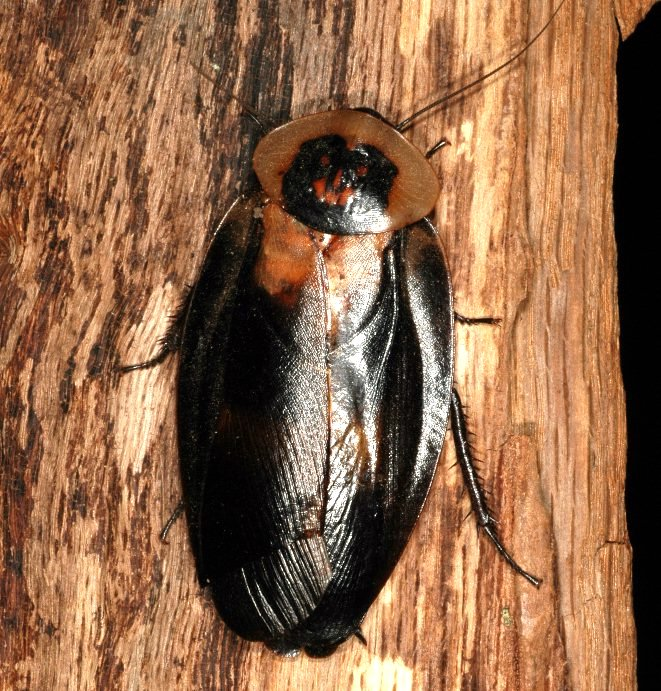

Scientific classification
- Kingdom: Animalia
- Phylum: Arthropoda
- Clade: Pancrustacea
- Class: Insecta
- Order: Blattodea
- Family: Blaberidae
- Genus: Blaberus
- Species: B. craniifer

Binomial name
- Blaberus craniifer Burmeister, 1838

= Death's head cockroach =

Species of cockroach

The death's head cockroach (Blaberus craniifer) is a species of cockroach belonging to the family Blaberidae. It is often confused with the discoid cockroach, Blaberus discoidalis, due to its similar appearance. It is distinguished by jet black cloak-like marking on its wings and a skull-shaped, amber/black marking on its pronotum. The name death's head comes from the markings on the top of the pronotum: "cranii", which is Latin for "of the head", and "fer", meaning "carry" or "carrier". Due to their unique appearance and certain characteristics, they make an easy to care for pet or display insect for entomologists and hobbyists.

== Distribution and habitat ==
B. craniifer is native to Mexico, the West Indies, and Central America. It has also been introduced into southern Florida in the United States. They can be found on forest floors, hiding in leaf matter and rotting wood.

== Diet and predators ==
In their native habitats, B. craniifer will feed on any organic food source available, including leaf matter. In captivity, it is recommended they are provided foods like fresh fruit and vegetables, wet dog food and moist cereal. B. craniifer is potential prey for both invertebrates, such as spiders, mantids, centipedes, and parasitoid wasps, and vertebrate insectivorous animals, including fish, amphibians, reptiles, birds and mammals.

== Behaviour ==
In response to a predator approaching or after an attack, B. craniifer burrows itself into softer substrates when possible, using its head and pronotum, allowing the cockroach to hide. Cockroaches are gregarious insects, meaning they often interact and associate with one another. B. craniifer secretes a volatile aggregative pheromone from the mandibular glands when engaging in gregarious behaviour.

== Physiology ==
Adults of B. craniifer have wings that possess pink flight muscles capable of supporting sustained flight. However, they generally only glide short distances. Juveniles lack wings and prefer to burrow.

Cockroaches, including B. craniifer, are known to possess independent pulsatile circulatory organs within their antennae, also known as an antennal heart.

It has been found that B. craniifer is capable of regenerating some of its tissues. B.craniifer can regenerate more proximal tissues and structures in a more distal amputation level on its leg after a distal part of the femur foreleg was transplanted to a proximal level of a hindleg tibia. This discovery concluded then that some insects are capable of regenerating certain tissues, and the most frequent type of regeneration in B. craniifer is intercalary regeneration.

== Reproduction and sexual dimorphism ==
B. craniifer are ovoviviparous cockroaches and mate once at a time. The act of mating begins with the female emitting a sex pheromone, which stimulates loco-motor activity in the male to approach the female. While the female emits the sex pheromones from pygidial glands, which are located posteriorly on the abdomen, she will also assume a calling posture. The male touches the female with his antennae to assess her as a sexual partner. The male raises his wings and wingsheaths vertically and rotates 180 degrees. The female turns and moves towards the males' abdominal tergites, where an aphrodisiac sex pheromone made exclusively by males is emitted through secretions. A close relationship is known to exist between the release of these pheromonal signals from specific glands and the corresponding behaviours of female calling posture and male wing raising. The female licks these secretions while the male slides backwards underneath the female and hooks the edge of the subgenital plate with his phallomere. The female allows insertion by the male into the genital atrium by turning 180 degrees and opening the abdominal cavity.

The spermatophore is made by the male inside the females' genital atrium, which is rejected by her multiple days later due to the secretions of her spermathecal glands. Several days later, an ootheca is laid and placed by the female into her brood sac. The gestation period for B. craniifer lasts 55 to 65 days. After this period, the ootheca is ejected and the larvae free themselves from the embryonic covering. During the preoviposition period and during gestation sexual receptivity of females is inhibited.

Both sexes have fully developed wings, but can be distinguished in that the females have a much larger subgenital plate than the males. While sexual dimorphism of the antennae is often seen in other cockroach species, such as Periplaneta americana, no antennal sexual dimorphism is apparent in B. craniifer.
