= Zdenekia =

Zdenekia Temporal range: Upper Carboniferous

Scientific classification
- Kingdom: Animalia
- Phylum: Arthropoda
- Clade: Pancrustacea
- Class: Insecta
- Order: †Paoliida
- Family: †Paoliidae
- Genus: †Zdenekia; Kukalová, 1958

Type species
- Zdenekia grandis Kukalová, 1958

Species
- †Z. grandis Kukalová, 1958; †Z. occidentalis Laurentiaux−Vieira & Laurentiaux, 1986; †Z. silesiensis Prokop et al., 2012

Extinct genus of insects

Zdenekia is a genus of extinct winged insects from the Upper Carboniferous period. It contains the species Z. grandis from the Czech Republic, Z. occidentalis from Belgium, and Z. silesiensis from Poland. Zdenekia is considered a member of the extinct order Paoliida, a group that historically had controversial affinities and composition but have been resolved as the sister group of Dictyoptera by recent studies.
