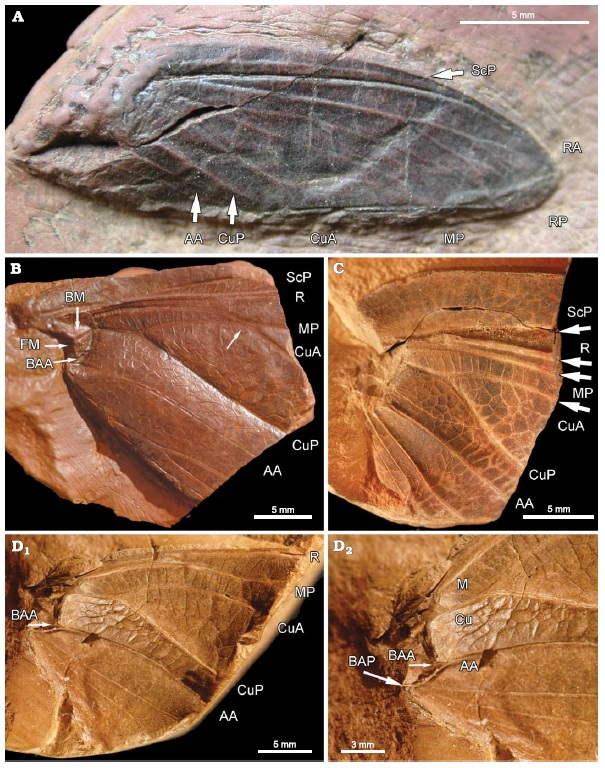
- Fossils of Paoliida. A: Zdenekia silesiensis; B: Darekia sanguinea; C, D_{1}, D_{2}: Paoliidae gen. et sp. indet.

Scientific classification
- Kingdom: Animalia
- Phylum: Arthropoda
- Class: Insecta
- Cohort: Polyneoptera
- Order: †Paoliida; Handlirsch, 1906

Families
- †Anthracoptilidae; †Blattinopsidae; †Paoliidae

Synonyms
- Protoptera Rasnitsyn, 1977

= Paoliida =

Paoliida Temporal range: Carboniferous–Permian

Extinct order of insects

Paoliida is an extinct order of winged insects that lived in the late Paleozoic. Historically, both their systematic position and composition were controversial – for instance they had been considered as palaeodictyopterans, as basal Neoptera, or as stem-group of Pterygota – but recent studies have resolved them as the sister group of Dictyoptera.

== Families and genera ==
After Prokop et al. (2014), Guan et al. (2016) and Nel & Poschmann (2021):

- †Anthracoptilidae Handlirsch, 1922 (Synonyms: Strephocladidae Martynov, 1938; Strephoneuridae Martynov, 1940; ?Adiphlebiidae Handlirsch, 1906)
  - ?†Adiphlebia Scudder, 1885
  - †Afrocladus Nel, Garrouste & Prokop, 2015
  - †Anthracoptilus Lameere, 1917
  - †Carrizocladus Rasnitsyn in Rasnitsyn et al., 2004
  - †Graticladus Novokshonov and Aristov, 2004
  - †Homocladus Carpenter, 1966
  - †Jarmilacladus Rasnitsyn and Aristov, 2004
  - †Lodevocladus Prokop et al., 2015
  - †Mesoptilus Lameere, 1917
  - †Mycteroptila Rasnitsyn, 1977
  - †Paracladus Carpenter, 1966
  - †Pruvostia Bolton, 1921
  - †Pseudomesoptilus Guan et al., 2016
  - †Rhinomaloptila Rasnitsyn, 1977
  - †Spargoptilon Kukalová, 1965
  - †Strephocladus Scudder, 1885
  - †Strephoneura Martynov, 1940
  - †Strephoptilus Rasnitsyn and Aristov, 2013
  - †Westphaloptilus Guan et al., 2016
- †Blattinopsidae Bolton, 1925 (Synonym: Klebsiellidae Handlirsch, 1906)
  - †Alienus Handlirsch, 1906
  - †Avionblattinopsis Quispe et al., 2021
  - †Balduriella Meunier, 1925
  - †Blattinopsis Giebel, 1867
  - †Glaphyrophlebia Handlirsch, 1906
  - †Klebsiella Meunier, 1908
  - †Microblattina Scudder, 1895
  - †Protoblattiniella Meunier, 1912
  - †Rhipidioptera Brongniart, 1894
  - †Stephanopsis Kukalová, 1958
  - †Westphaloblattinopsis Béthoux and Jarzembowski, 2010
- †Paoliidae Handlirsch, 1906 (Synonyms: Ideliidae Zalessky, 1928; Herbstialidae Schmidt, 1953; Permulidae Aristov & Storozhenko, 2011; Permotermopsidae Martynov, 1937)
  - †Acropermula Aristov and Storozhenko, 2011
  - †Aenigmidelia Sharov, 1961
  - †Archidelia Sharov, 1961
  - †Carbonidelia Nel, Garrouste & Jouault, 2023
  - †Darekia Prokop et al., 2012
  - †Herbstiala Schmidt, 1952
  - †Holasicia Kukalová, 1958
  - †Idelina Storozhenko, 1992
  - †Kemperala Brauckmann, 1984
  - †Khosaridelia Storozhenko, 1992
  - †Kortshakolia Sharov, 1961
  - †Kochopteron Brauckmann, 1984
  - †Mertovia Prokop and Nel, 2007
  - †Micaidelia Aristov 2004
  - †Mongoloidelia Storozhenko, 1992
  - †Olinka Kukalová, 1958
  - ?†Paolekia Riek, 1976
  - †Paolia Smith, 1871
  - †Paoliola Handlirsch, 1919
  - †Permotermopsis Martynov, 1937
  - †Permula Handlirsch, 1919
  - †Protoblattina Meunier, 1909
  - †Pseudofouquea Handlirsch, 1906
  - †Silesiapteron Prokop et al., 2013
  - †Simplexpaolia Santos et al., 2023
  - †Sojanidelia Storozhenko, 1992
  - †Stenaropodites Martynov, 1928
  - †Sustaia Kukalová, 1958
  - †Sylvidelia Martynov, 1940
  - †Zdenekia Kukalová, 1958
