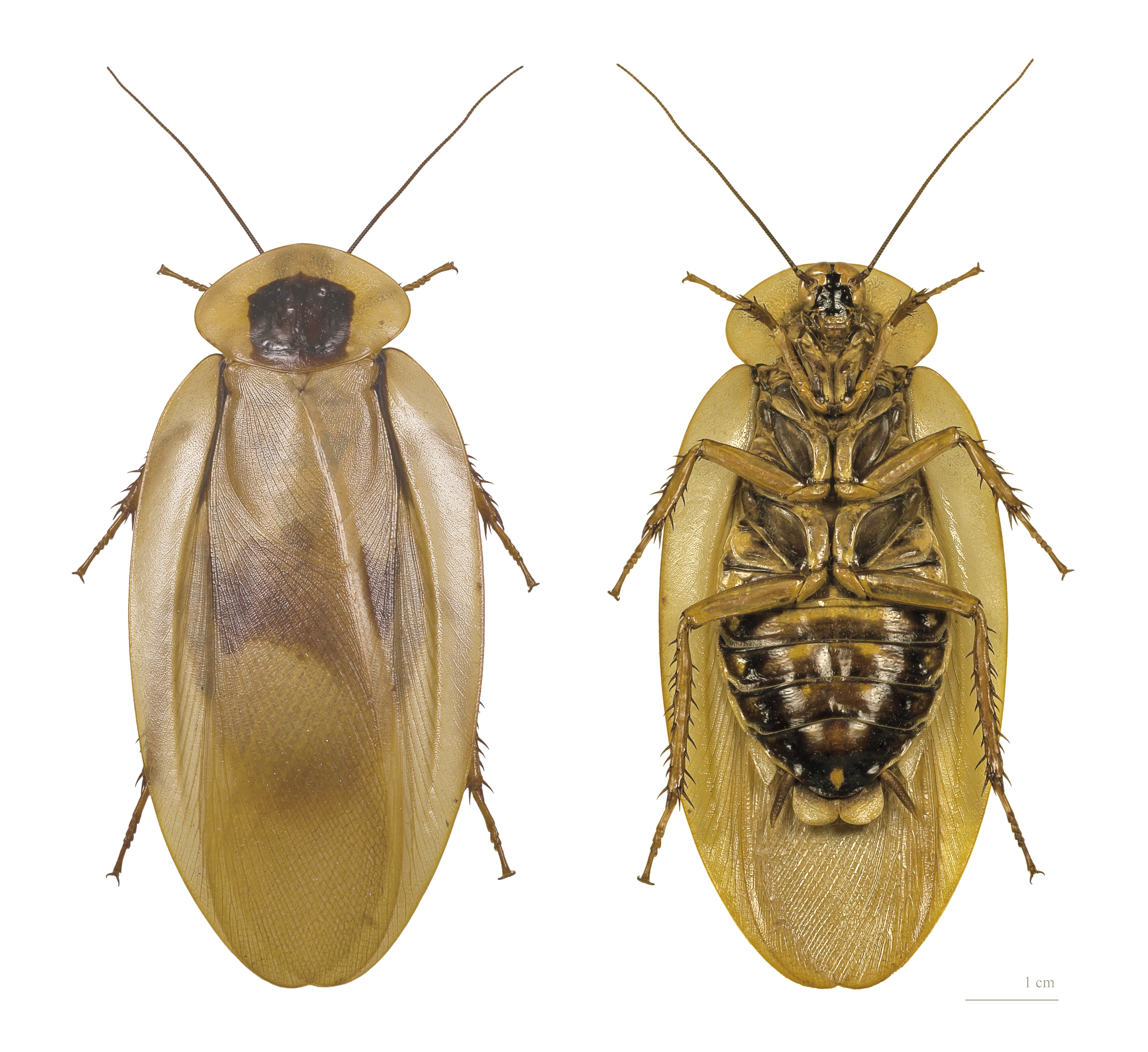
- Blaberus giganteus

Scientific classification
- Kingdom: Animalia
- Phylum: Arthropoda
- Clade: Pancrustacea
- Class: Insecta
- Order: Blattodea
- Family: Blaberidae
- Subfamily: Blaberinae
- Genus: Blaberus; Serville, 1831

Species
- see text

Diversity
- 31 species

Synonyms
- Blabera Serville, 1838; Libisoca Walker, 1868; Sisapona Walker, 1868

= Blaberus =

Genus of cockroaches

Blaberus is a genus of cockroaches native to the Neotropics found in the Americas. At least 31 valid species are in the genus, as well as at least 39 invalid species, and some of them are popular among hobbyists as pets or as feed for other arthropods (Blaberus discoidalis in particular serves this function). Unlike several genera of cockroaches considered to be pests, this genus keeps its ootheca in its abdomen until the time it hatches. They generally require a relative humidity of 60% or higher to thrive and temperatures above 25 °C (28-30 °C is best) to reproduce.

Blaberus giganteus is one of the world's longest cockroaches. B. craniifer's popular name, "death's head roach" is often attributed to B. discoidalis, as well.

== Species ==
This genus contains these species (now placed in 4 superspecies marked with a §):

- Blaberus asellus Thunberg, 1826
- Blaberus latissimus Herbst, 1786
- Blaberus (superspecies atropos) Roth, 1786 §
  - Blaberus amazonensis Lopes & Oliveira, 2013
  - Blaberus anisitsi Brancsik, 1898
  - Blaberus atropos Stoll, 1813
  - Blaberus boliviensis Princis, 1946
  - Blaberus colombianus Lopes & Oliveira, 2013
  - Blaberus discoidalis Serville, 1839
  - Blaberus duckei Jurberg, Albuquerque, Rebordoes, Goncalves & Felippe, 1977
  - Blaberus matogrossensis Rocha e Silva & Aguiar, 1977
  - Blaberus neomatogrossensis Lopes & Oliveira, 2013
  - Blaberus parabolicus Walker, 1868
  - Blaberus paulistanus Lopes & Oliveira, 2000
  - Blaberus peruvianus Jurberg, Albuquerque, Rebordoes, Goncalves & Felippe, 1977
  - Blaberus peruvibolicus Lopes & Oliveira, 2013
  - Blaberus yuracianus Lopes & Oliveira, 2013
- Blaberus (superspecies brasilianus) Roth, 1969 §
  - Blaberus affinis Jurberg, Albuquerque, Rebordoes, Goncalves & Felippe, 1977
  - Blaberus brasilianus Sausseur, 1864
  - Blaberus chacoensis Lopes & Oliveira, 2013
  - Blaberus colosseus Illiger, 1801
  - Blaberus fusiformis Walker, 1868
  - Blaberus minor Saussure, 1864
  - Blaberus neofusiformis Lopes & Oliveira, 2013
  - Blaberus nigrocephalicus Lopes & Oliveira, 2013
  - Blaberus parafusiformis Lopes & Oliveira, 2013
  - Blaberus scutatus Saussure & Zehntner, 1894
  - Blaberus valleyanus Lopes & Oliveira, 2013
- Blaberus (superspecies giganteus) Roth, 1969 §
  - Blaberus craniifer Burmeister, 1838
  - Blaberus giganteus Linnaeus, 1758
  - Blaberus nigromaculatus Lopes & Oliveira, 2013
- Blaberus (superspecies macurus) Lopes & Oliveira, 2013 §
  - Blaberus macurus Lopes & Oliveira, 2013
