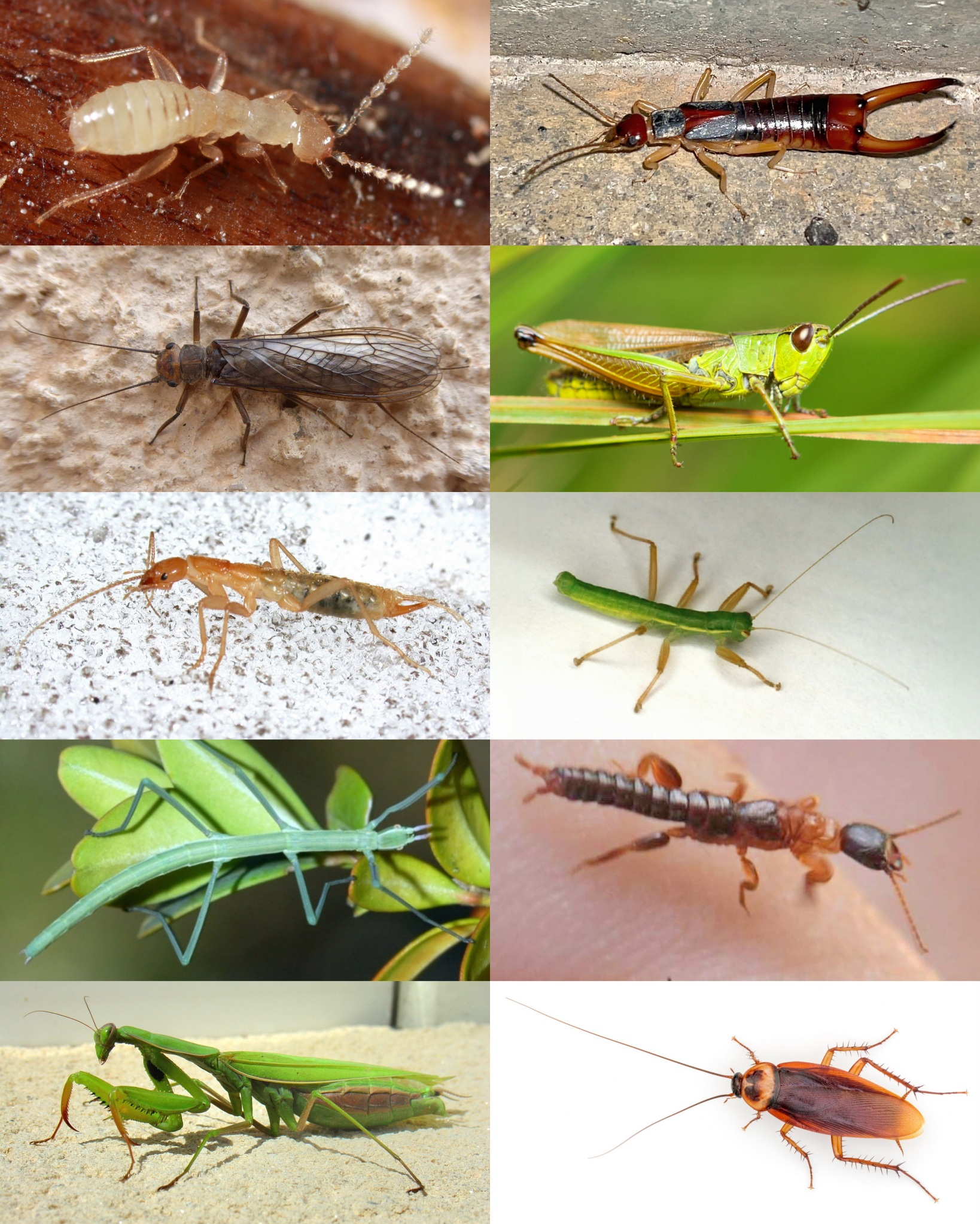
- All polyneoptera extant orders: row 1: Zoraptera, Dermaptera row 2: Plecoptera, Orthoptera row 3: Grylloblattodea, Mantophasmatodea row 4: Phasmatodea, Embioptera row 5: Mantodea, Blattodea

Scientific classification
- Kingdom: Animalia
- Phylum: Arthropoda
- Clade: Pancrustacea
- Class: Insecta
- Clade: Dicondylia
- Subclass: Pterygota
- Infraclass: Neoptera
- Cohort: Polyneoptera; Martynov, 1923

Orders
- See text

Synonyms
- Gryllones; Orthoptères; Orthopteroidea; Orthopterodea; Paurometabola; Polyneopterata; Plecopterodea

= Polyneoptera =

Group of insects

The cohort Polyneoptera is one of the major groups of winged insects, comprising the Orthoptera (grasshoppers, crickets, etc.) and all other neopteran insects believed to be more closely related to Orthoptera than to any other insect orders. They were formerly grouped together with the Palaeoptera and Paraneoptera as the Hemimetabola or Exopterygota on the grounds that they have no pupa, the wings gradually developing externally throughout the nymphal stages; their metamorphosis is deemed "incomplete". Many members of the group have leathery forewings (tegmina) and hindwings with an enlarged anal field (vannus).

When Carl Linnaeus started applying binomial names to animals in the 10th edition of his Systema Naturae in 1758, he recognized relatively few animal species, and consequently relatively few groups that encompassed these species. As more and more new species were discovered, described and named, and importantly, their differences recognised and codified, the original groups proposed by Linnaeus were split up and/or expanded. The group of insects now recognized as being polyneopterans were, by Linnaeus, considered to belong within the genus Gryllus; the modern definition of this genus is restricted to species of closely related crickets, but in Linnaeus' original definition the genus contained crickets, grasshoppers, locusts, katydids / bush crickets (Tettigoniidae), stick insects, and praying mantises. These groups, along with the cockroaches, which Linnaeus considered as distinct, are all polyneopteran insects. The recently recognized order Mantophasmatodea is also included within Polyneoptera.

== Taxonomy ==
=== Extant ===
The following extant orders are included in Polyneoptera:

- Order Orthoptera (grasshoppers, crickets, katydids, etc.)
- Order Plecoptera (stoneflies)
- Clade Haplocercata
  - Order Dermaptera (earwigs)
  - Order Zoraptera (angel insects)
- Superorder Dictyoptera
  - Order Blattodea (cockroaches and termites)
  - Order Mantodea (praying mantises)
- Superorder Mecynoptera
  - Clade Eukinolabia
    - Order Embioptera (web-spinners)
    - Order Phasmatodea (stick and leaf insects)
  - Clade Notoptera/Xenonomia
    - Order Grylloblattodea (ice-crawlers) (Note: The orders Grylloblattodea and Mantophasmatodea are sometimes ranked as suborders of a single order, Notoptera.)
    - Order Mantophasmatodea (gladiators)

=== Fossil ===
The following fossil groups are included in Polyneoptera:

- Archaeorthoptera (Orthoptera and stem-group relatives)
  - †Caloneurodea
  - †Cnemidolestodea (= Cnemidolestida)
  - †Geraroptera
  - †Titanoptera – Carboniferous to Triassic
  - order Incertae sedis
    - family †Cacurgidae Handlirsch, 1911
    - family †Chresmodidae Haase, 1890
    - family †Permostridulidae Béthoux, Nel, Lapeyrie & Gand, 2003
    - family †Protophasmatidae Brongniart, 1885
    - genus †Chenxiella Liu, Ren & Prokop, 2009
    - genus †Lobeatta Béthoux, 2005
    - genus †Longzhua Gu, Béthoux & Ren, 2011
    - genus †Nectoptilus Béthoux, 2005
    - genus †Sinopteron Prokop & Ren, 2007
- Stem-group Phasmatodea
  - †family Xiphopteridae Sharov 1968
  - †family Prochresmodidae Vishnyakova 1980
  - †family Aeroplanidae Tillyard 1918
  - †family Cretophasmatidae Sharov 1968
  - †family Aerophasmatidae Martynov, 1928
- Stem-group Dermaptera
  - †Protelytroptera
- †"Grylloblattida" (Stem-group Grylloblattodea?)
  - †Geinitziidae
  - †Gorochoviidae
  - †Juraperlidae
  - †Bajanzhargalanidae
  - ...
- †Eoblattida
- †Paoliida
- †Protorthoptera
- † family Magicivenidae

== Phylogeny ==
The following cladogram is based on the molecular phylogeny of Wipfler et al. 2019:

- - - Zoraptera (angel insects)
    - Dermaptera (earwigs)
  - - Plecoptera (stoneflies)
    - - Orthoptera (grasshoppers, crickets, katydids)
      - - Mecynoptera
          - Notoptera
            - Grylloblattodea (ice crawlers)
            - Mantophasmatodea (gladiators)
          - Eukinolabia
            - Phasmatodea (stick insects)
            - Embioptera (webspinners)
        - Dictyoptera
          - Mantodea (mantises)
          - Blattodea (cockroaches and termites)

Phylogeny after Wang et al. 2026

- Polyneoptera
  - Zoraptera (angel insects)
  - - Dermoplectopterida
      - Dermaptera (earwigs)
      - Plecoptera (stoneflies)
    - - Orthoptera (grasshoppers, crickets, katydids)
      - - Dictyoptera
          - Mantodea (mantises)
          - Blattodea (cockroaches and termites)
        - Mecynoptera
          - Notoptera/Xenonomia
            - Grylloblattodea (ice crawlers)
            - Mantophasmatodea (gladiators)
          - Eukinolabia
            - Phasmatodea (stick insects)
            - Embioptera (webspinners)

== See also ==
- List of Orthopteroid genera containing species recorded in Europe
- List of orthopteroids of Korea
