= Koshelevka Formation =

Geologic formation in Russia

- Stratigraphic range: Kungurian
- Type: Geological formation

Location
- Region: Perm
- Country: Russia

The Koshelevka Formation is an early Permian formation from Russia, located on the banks of the Sylva River. It contains the Tshekarda/Chekarda lagerstätte, which is the most diverse Permian insect lagerstätte known.

== Paleobiota ==
An indeterminate tshekardocoleid larva from Koshelevka

The Koshelevka Formation preserves over 200 insect species from 25 orders, alongside numerous plant species. Other taxa are quite rare, however they do still appear, with the uraraneid Permarachne and centipede Permocrassacus being among them.
