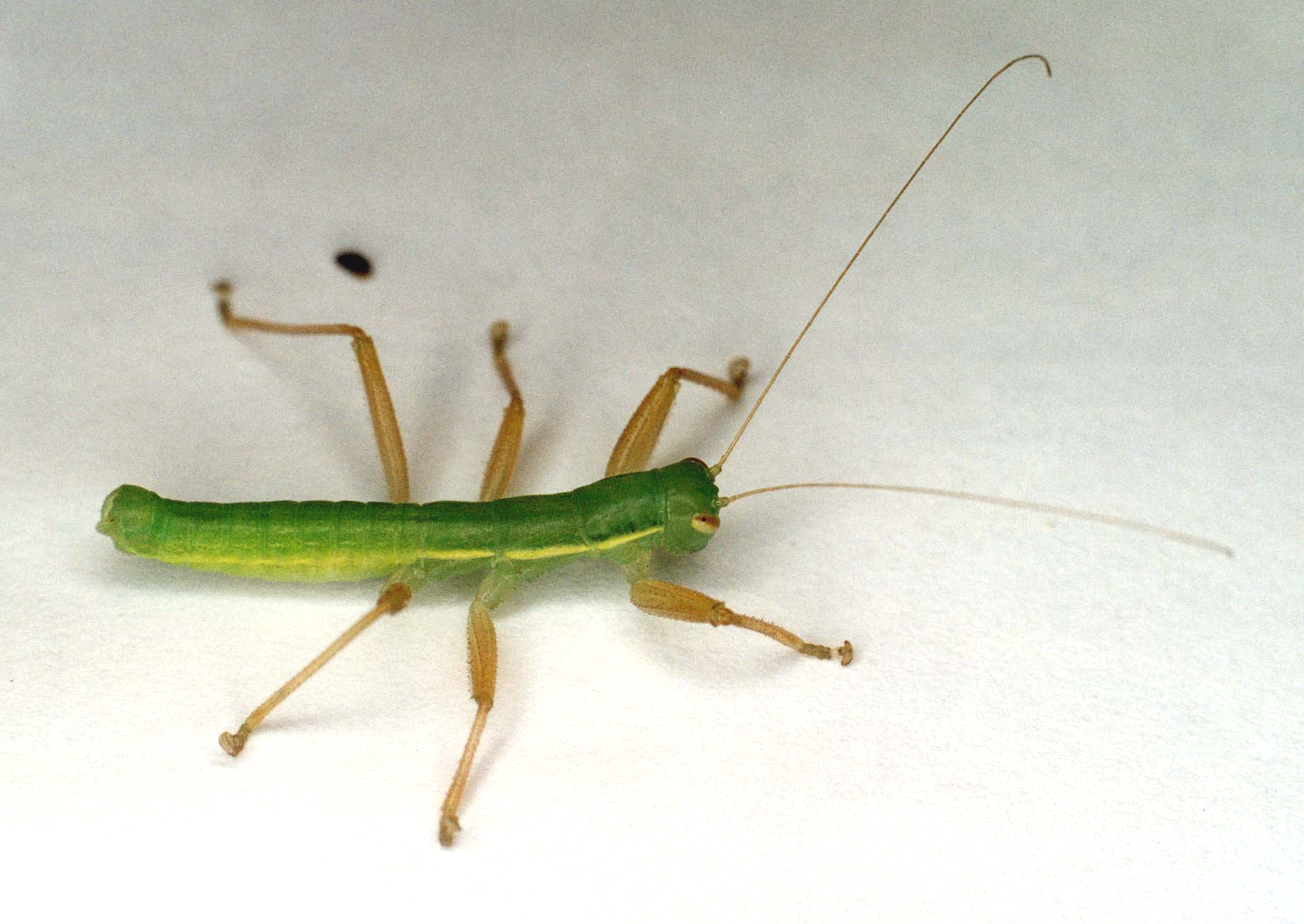
- Mantophasma zephyra (Mantophasmatidae)
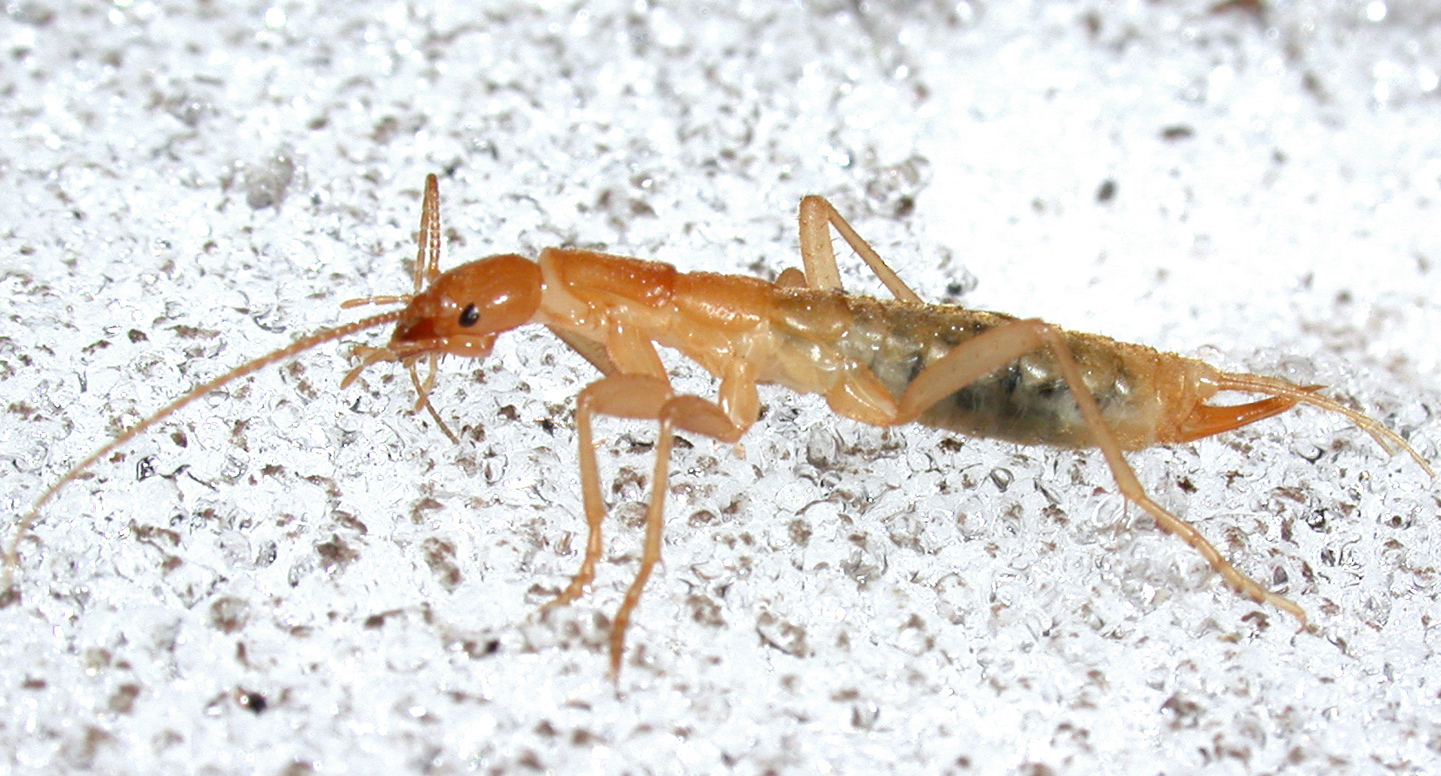
- Member of Grylloblattidae

Scientific classification
- Kingdom: Animalia
- Phylum: Arthropoda
- Clade: Pancrustacea
- Class: Insecta
- Cohort: Polyneoptera
- Clade: Notoptera; Crampton, 1915

Subgroups & families
- †Camptoneuritidae; †Tillyardembiidae; †Geinitziidae; Grylloblattodea; †Aristovia; †Blattogryllidae; †Plesioblattogryllidae; †Zygogrylloblatta; Grylloblattidae (ice-crawlers); Mantophasmatodea; Mantophasmatidae (gladiators); And see text

Synonyms
- Xenonomia Terry & Whiting, 2005

= Notoptera =

Notoptera Temporal range: 320–0 Ma Late Carboniferous-Present

Clade of wingless insects

Notoptera, also known as Xenonomia, is an order of insects belonging to Polyneoptera. It contains two living suborders, Mantophasmatidae (gladiators) native to Southern Africa, and Grylloblattidae (ice crawlers) native to cold montane environments in the Northern Hemisphere. Both are wingless.

== History of research ==
The name was originally coined in 1915 as an order for Grylloblattidae and largely forgotten until it was resurrected and redefined ("Notoptera Crampton sensu novum") by Engel and Grimaldi in 2004 (after the discovery of living Mantophasmatidae), who recommended to give a single order that includes both the living and fossil representatives of the lineage.

Terry and Whiting in 2005 independently proposed a new name, "Xenonomia", for the same lineage of insects (including the Grylloblattodea and Mantophasmatodea, treated as orders). The orders Grylloblattodea and Mantophasmatodea are sometimes ranked as suborders of a single order, Notoptera. Some authors consider this the valid name of the group.

== Evolutionary history ==
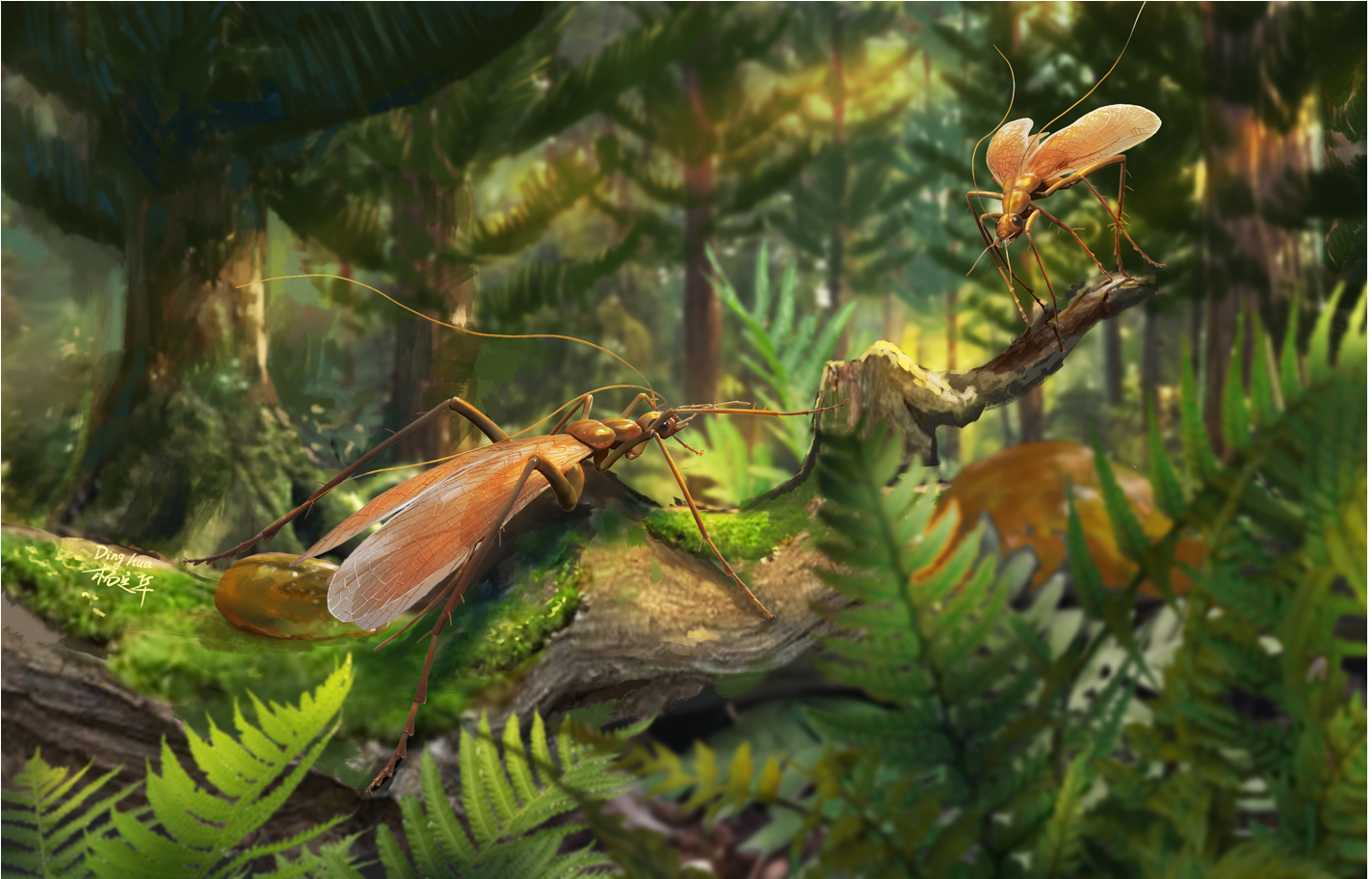
Life restoration of Zygogrylloblatta, a winged "grylloblattidan" from the mid-Cretaceous

The earliest stem-group representatives of Notoptera/Xenonomia had emerged by the Late Carboniferous, around 320 million years ago. Early members of the group, which unlike modern notopterans had wings, have been referred to as members of "Grylloblattida" and "Reculida", with their relationships to modern notopterans historically being the subject of controversy. Winged "grylloblattidans" reached their apex of diversity during the Permian (299-252 million years ago), where they represented up to a third of all insects at some localities. The earliest mantophasmatids are known from the Middle Jurassic of China, around 160 million years ago. No fossil record of modern grylloblattids is known, though the winged Aristovia and Zygogrylloblatta are known from the Burmese amber of Myanmar dating to the mid-Cretaceous around 100 million years ago, have mouthparts very similar to modern grylloblattids, indicating their closer relationship to modern grylloblattids than to mantophasmatids. Mantophasmatids and grylloblattids are thought to have lost their wings independently. Winged "grylloblattidans" declined in diversity and abundance from the Triassic onwards, with the youngest records of winged "grylloblattidans" dating to the Early-mid Cretaceous.

== List of extinct families ==
Following Aristov (2015):

Eoblattida

- †Atactophlebiidae
- †Bardapteridae
- †Blattogryllidae
- †Cacurgidae? (other authors place this family in Panorthoptera and unrelated to Notoptera)
- †Daldubidae
- †Doubraviidae
- †Eoblattidae? (other authors place this family in Archaeorthoptera and unrelated to Notoptera)
- †Euryptilonidae
- †Ideliidae? (other authors place this family in Paoliida as a synonym of Paoliidae and unrelated to Notoptera)
- †Idelinellidae
- †Megakhosaridae
- †Mesorthopteridae
- †Permopectinidae
- †Permotermopsidae? (other authors place this family in Paoliida as a synonym of Paoliidae and unrelated to Notoptera)
- †Protophasmatidae
- †Soyanopteridae
- †Tococladidae? (other authors place this family in Cnemidolestodea and unrelated to Notoptera)

Reculida

- †Archiprobnidae
- †Bajanzhargalanidae
- †Camptoneuritidae
- †Chaulioditidae
- †Chelopteridae
- †Epideigmatidae
- †Euremiscidae
- †Geinitziidae
- †Gorochoviidae
- †Havlatiidae
- †Ivapteridae
- †Kargalopteridae
- †Lemmatophoridae
- †Liomopteridae
- †Madygenophlebiidae
- †Neleidae
- †Probnidae
- †Protoblattinidae? (other authors place this family in Paoliida as a synonym of Paoliidae and unrelated to Notoptera)
- †Reculidae
- †Sinonamuropteridae
- †Skaliciidae
- †Sylvaphlebiidae

== Gallery ==
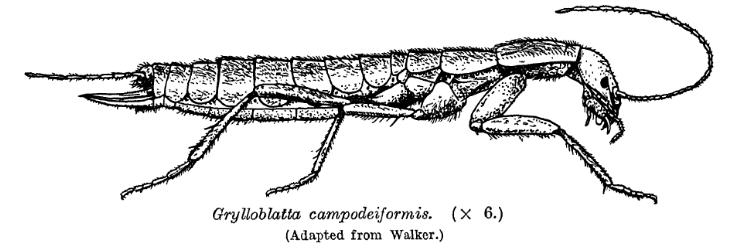
Grylloblatta campodeiformis

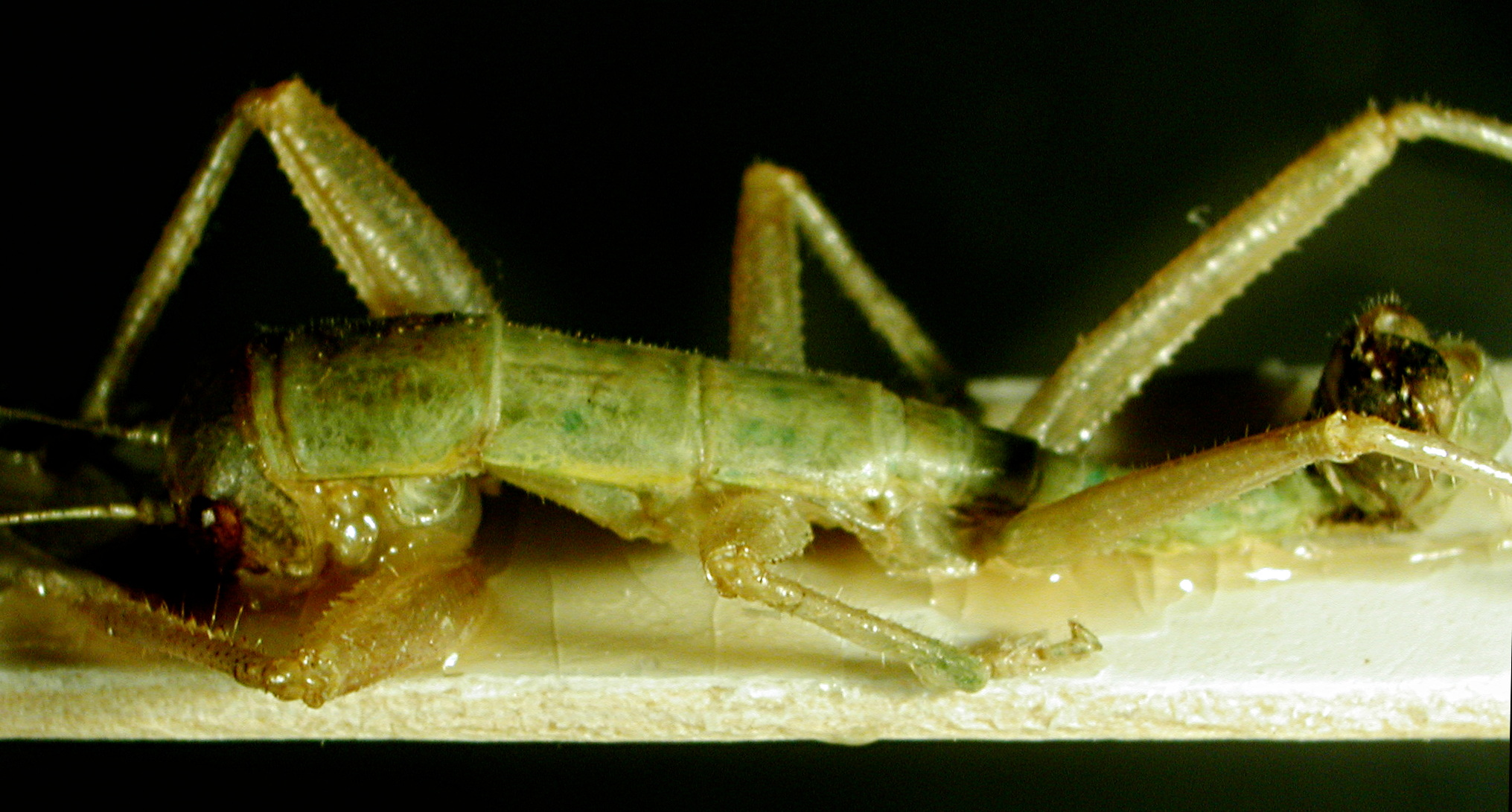
A nymph of a mantophasmatid

== See also ==
- Grylloblattidae
- Mantophasmatidae
- Palaeocixiidae
