= Spiralizoros cervicornis =

Scientific classification
- Domain: Eukaryota
- Kingdom: Animalia
- Phylum: Arthropoda
- Class: Insecta
- Order: Zoraptera
- Family: Spiralizoridae
- Genus: Spiralizoros
- Species: S. cervicornis

Binomial name
- Spiralizoros cervicornis (Mashimo, Yoshizawa & Engel, 2013)

Synonyms
- Zorotypus cervicornis Mashimo, Yoshizawa & Engel, 2013

Species of insect

Spiralizoros cervicornis is a species of insect in the order Zoraptera. It was first found in Malaysia.

This species was formerly a member of the genus Zorotypus.
