= Spiralizoros silvestrii =

Scientific classification
- Kingdom: Animalia
- Phylum: Arthropoda
- Clade: Pancrustacea
- Class: Insecta
- Order: Zoraptera
- Family: Spiralizoridae
- Genus: Spiralizoros
- Species: S. silvestrii

Binomial name
- Spiralizoros silvestrii (Karny, 1927)

Synonyms
- Zorotypus silvestrii Karny, 1927

Species of insect

Spiralizoros silvestrii is a species of angel insect in the family Zorotypidae. It is found in the Mentawai Islands of Indonesia.

This species was formerly a member of the genus Zorotypus.
