= Economic entomology =

Branch of entomology

Economic entomology is a field of entomology, which involves the study of insects that benefit or harm humans, domestic animals, and crops. Insects that pose disadvantages are considered pests. Some species can cause indirect damage by spreading diseases, and these are termed as disease vectors. Those that are beneficial include those that are reared for food such as honey, substances such as lac or pigments, and for their role in pollinating crops and controlling pests.

== History ==
In the 18th century many works were published on agriculture. Many contained accounts of pest insects. In France Claude Sionnest (1749–1820) was a notable figure.

=== 19th century ===
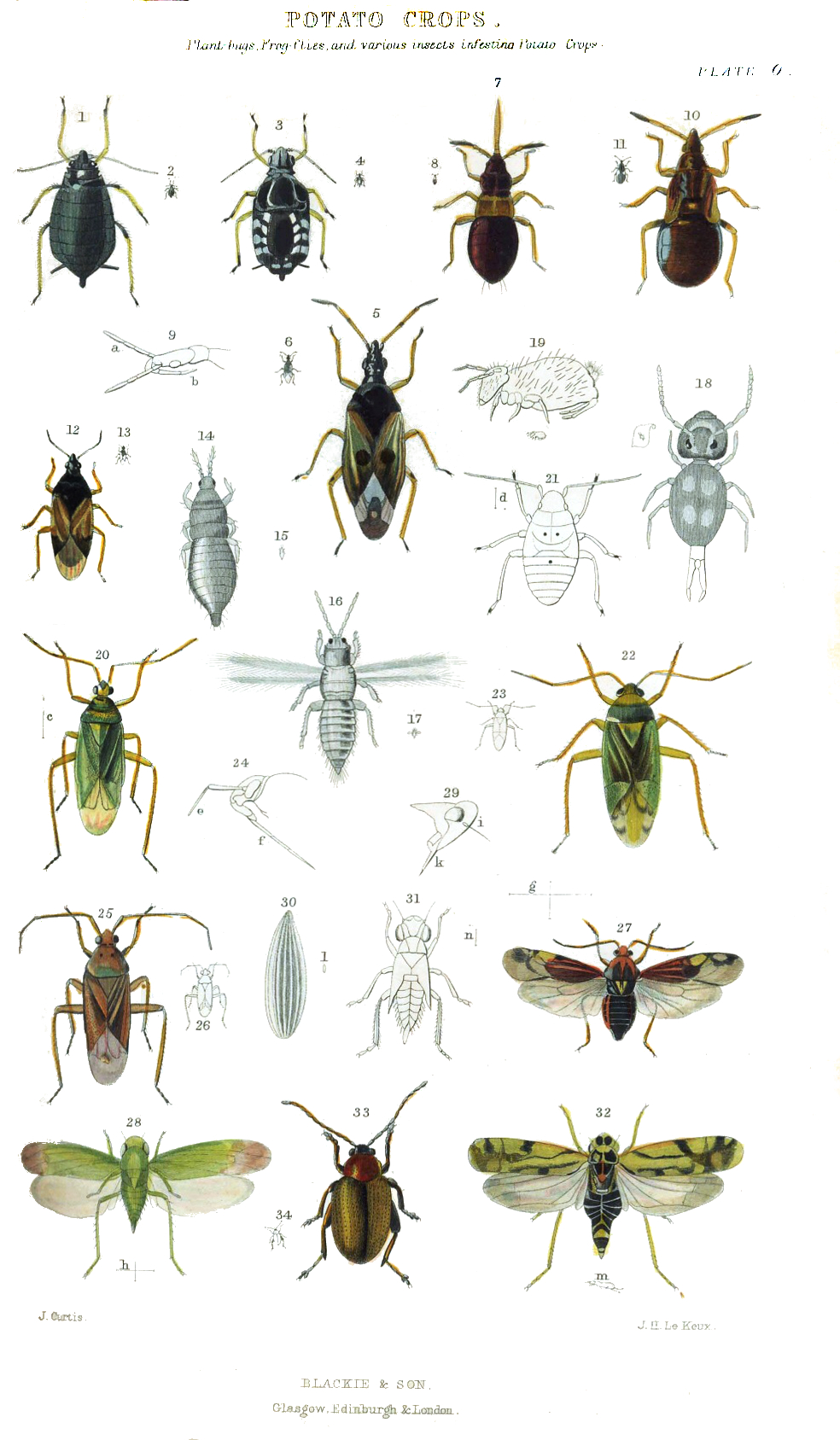
"Insects infesting potato crops": a plate from John Curtis's Farm Insects, 1860

In Britain, John Curtis wrote the influential 1860 treatise Farm Insects, dealing with the insect pests of corn, roots, grass and stored grain. Fruit and pests were described by authors such as Saunders, Joseph Albert Lintner, Eleanor Anne Ormerod, Charles Valentine Riley, Mark Vernon Slingerland in America and Canada. The pioneers in Europe were Ernst Ludwig Taschenberg, Sven Lampa (1839–1914), Enzio Reuter (1867–1951) and Vincenze Kollar. Charles French (1842–1933), Walter Wilson Froggatt (1858–1937) and Henry Tryon (1856–1943) pioneered in Australia.

It was not until the last quarter of the 19th century that any real advance was made in the study of economic entomology. Among the early writings, apart from the book of Curtis, there was a publication by Pohl and Kollar, entitled Insects Injurious to Gardeners, Foresters and Farmers, published in 1837, and Taschenberg's Praktische Insecktenkunde. During the 19th century, Italian entomologists made significant progress in controlling diseases of the silkworm moth, in the control of agricultural pests and in stored product entomology. Significant figures were: Agostino Bassi ( 1773–1856), Camillo Rondani (1808–1879), Adolfo Targioni Tozzetti (1823–1902), Pietro Stefanelli (1835, 1919), Camillo Acqua (1863–1936) Antonio Berlese (1863–1927), Gustavo Leonardi(1869–1918) and Enrico Verson (1845–1927). In France, Etienne Laurent Joseph Hippolyte Boyer de Fonscolombe, Charles Jean-Baptiste Amyot, Émile Blanchard, Valéry Mayet and Claude Charles Goureau were early workers, as was Jean Victoire Audouin, the author of Histoire des insectes nuisibles à la vigne et particulièrement de la Pyrale, Philippe Alexandre Jules Künckel d'Herculais, Joseph Jean Baptiste Géhin and Maurice Jean Auguste Girard.

American literature began as far back as 1788, when a report on the Hessian fly was issued by Sir Joseph Banks; in 1817 Thomas Say began his writings; while in 1856 Asa Fitch started his report on Noxious Insects of New York. Also in America, Matthew Cooke wrote Treatise on the Insects Injurious to Fruit and Fruit Trees of the State of California, and Remedies Recommended for Their Extermination, published in 1881. The Englishman Frederick Vincent Theobald wrote A textbook of agricultural zoology in 1890. It became a standard text worldwide. Notable foresters were Herman von Nördlinger (1818–1897) and Julius Theodor Christian Ratzeburg (1801–1871).

Pest infestations in colonial spaces spurred further research on pest control: The context of colonial plantation agriculture and an increasingly interconnected world, with its impact on the environment, and, consequently, on the spread of insects, provided further impetus for economic entomology at the turn of the 10th century.

=== 20th century ===
Among the most important reports early in the 20th century were those of Charles Valentine Riley, published by the U.S. Department of Agriculture, extending from 1878 to his death, in which an enormous amount of valuable material is embodied. After his death, the work fell to Professor Leland Ossian Howard, in the form of Bulletin of the U.S. Department of Agriculture. The chief writings of J. A. Lintner extend from 1882 to 1898, in yearly parts, under the title of Reports on the Injurious Insects of the State of New York. Another significant contributor to the entomological literature of the United States was Charles W. Woodworth. The Florida entomologist Wilmon Newell was a pioneer of pest control as was Clarence Preston Gillette. In India, Thomas Bainbrigge Fletcher succeeded Harold Maxwell-Lefroy and Lionel de Nicéville as Imperial Entomologist and wrote Some South Indian insects and other animals of importance considered especially from an economic point of view, an influential work in the subcontinent. In France Alfred Balachowsky was a key figure.

Developments in the last quarter of the 20th century consisted of new techniques and theories that were pioneered and developed, including Integrated Pest Management by Ray F. Smith.

== Harmful insects ==
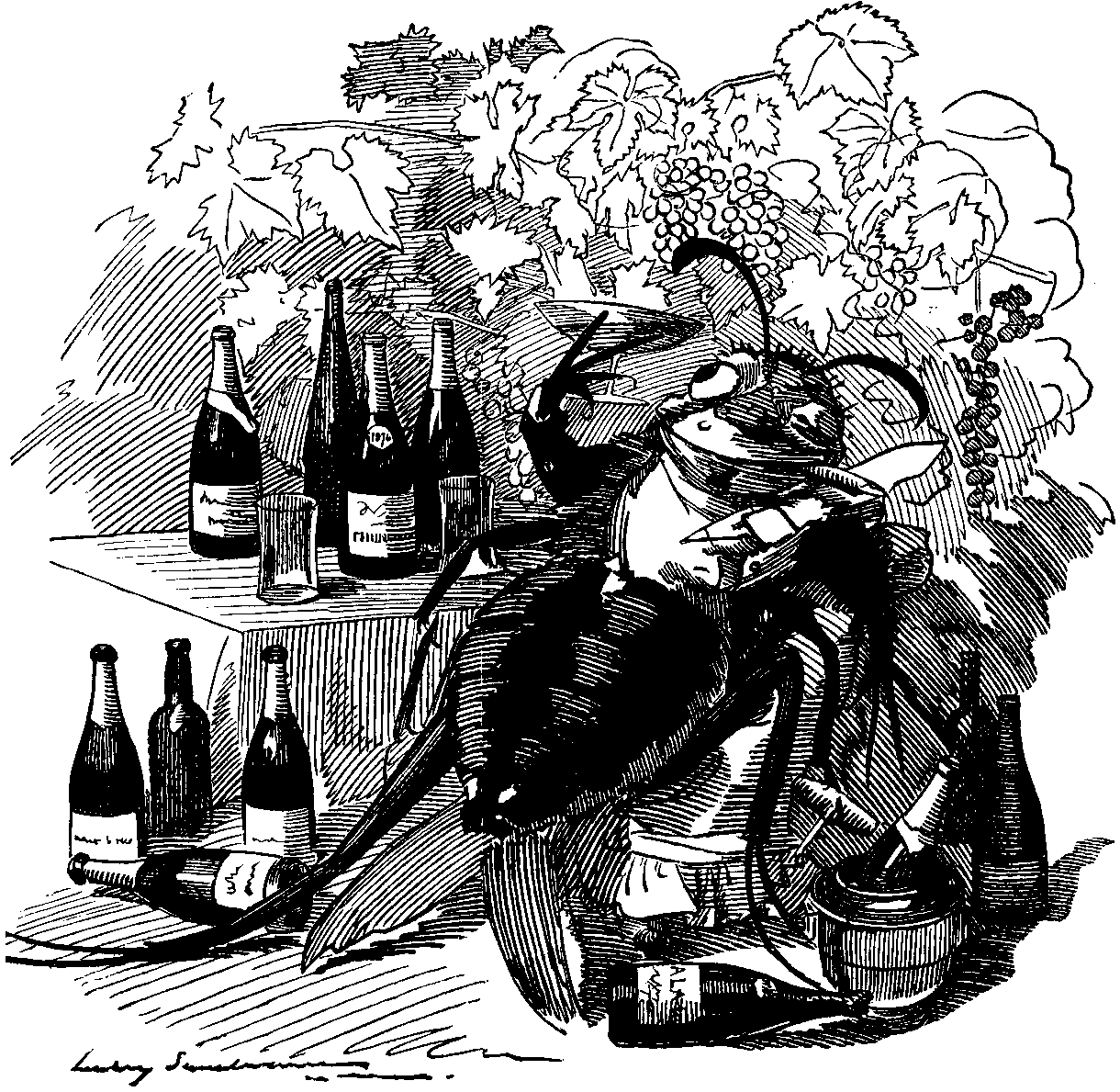
The phylloxera, a true gourmet, finds out the best vineyards and attaches itself to the best wines Cartoon from Punch, 6 September 1890

Insects considered pests of some sort occur among all major living orders with the exception of Ephemeroptera (mayflies), Odonata (dragonflies), Plecoptera (stoneflies), Embioptera (webspinners), Trichoptera (caddisflies), Neuroptera (in the broad sense), and Mecoptera, as well as the lesser known groups Zoraptera, Grylloblattodea, and Mantophasmatodea. Conversely, of course, essentially all insect orders primarily have members which are beneficial, in some respects, with the exception of Phthiraptera (lice), Siphonaptera (fleas), and Strepsiptera, the three orders whose members are exclusively parasitic.

Insects are considered pests for a variety of reasons, including direct damage by feeding on crop plants in the field or by infesting stored products, indirect damage by spreading viral diseases of crop plants (especially by sucking insects such as leafhoppers), spreading disease among humans and livestock, and annoyance to humans. Examples of insects regarded as pests include the phylloxera, migratory locusts, the Colorado potato beetle, the boll weevil, Japanese beetle, aphids, mosquitoes, cockroaches, the Western corn rootworm, and some fly species.

In the past entomologists working on pest insects attempted to eradicate species. This rarely worked except in islands or controlled environments and raised ethical issues. Over time the language changed to terms like control and management. The indiscriminate use of toxic and persistent chemicals and the resurgence of pests in the history of cotton growing in the US has been particularly well studied.

=== Medical and veterinary entomology ===
Medical and veterinary entomology have a strong link to economic entomology. Insects pose both benefits as well as disadvantages to medical and veterinary applications, to humans and to livestock. Insect pests or beneficial ones alike have direct and indirect effects on the economy. Millions of dollars have gone towards developing novel preventative measures and efforts to environmentally prevent, suppress, and eradicate insect pests in Canada as of 2020. An example of a common insect across the world involved in medical and veterinary entomology is mosquitos. Mosquitos (family Culicidae) are well known disease vectors that can transmit and transport diseases and viruses in humans. Different subfamilies of mosquitos can correspond to different types of illnesses. The most prevalent and commonly known disease transmitted by mosquitos is likely malaria.

==== Malaria ====
Malaria is caused by protozoans, specifically in the Plasmodium genus, that travels via mosquito transmission. Malaria is then prevalent in humans when mosquitos bite humans, and affects humans by infection of bodily organs including the kidney and neighboring tissues. This disease is most prevalent in third world countries and countries in sub-Saharan Africa. By 2050, it is estimated that 5.2 billion individuals will be at risk of developing malaria across the world. As of 2020, there have been over 1 million cases of death via mosquito transmission and infection of malaria recorded in sub-Saharan Africa. This demonstrates a close association of malaria with poverty in some countries. The likelihood of children developing malaria in a richer neighborhood is much lower than the likelihood of children developing malaria in a poorer area. A study in 1995 observed that areas of the world that were abundant with malaria patients earned only 1/3 of what other countries that were not exposed to malaria were earning. In addition, the study demonstrated that areas that had a higher GDP per capita in the mid to late 1900s had a lower risk of developing malaria, and areas that had a lower GDP per capita from $4000 and less had a much higher risk of developing malaria. Malaria deterrence and prevention is likely lower in less developed and/or rich countries as they may not have sufficient financial aid or resources to combat the abundance of mosquitos present, allowing the countries to become more at risk of developing malaria in all age groups and social groups alike.

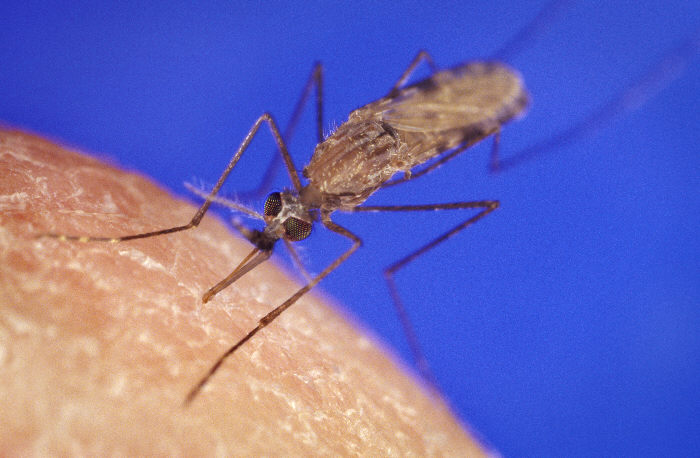
Anopheles gambiae. A known disease vector, a part of the mosquito family Culicinae that is one of the primary species that transmits and spreads malaria.

Although mosquitos have a profound effect on human disease transmission, they also have a large effect on veterinary entomology. The Eastern equine encephalomyelitis virus primarily affects horses. Once they are infected, they exhibit high body temperatures and fevers, as well as abnormal and imbalanced behavior. Following these symptoms, they fall into a coma and die soon after. The Japanese encephalitis virus affects livestock in Asian countries Malaysia, Indonesia, and Japan. These animals are subject to abortion and stillbirth, and potentially sterility following infection. The death of these animals caused by the disease transmission of mosquitos poses economic issues in these countries specifically, as they rely on them as a source of food as well as for their income. Livestock, mainly horses and swine in Malaysia, Japan, and Indonesia is a commodity for many inhabitants.

Movements to eradicate mosquito populations in malaria patient dense areas have proven to be insufficient and unsuccessful, with the exception of recently infected areas or smaller populations on small islands. Pushing towards eradicating mosquitos altogether can pose enormous effects on global ecosystems. Mosquitos are still required to upkeep the food chain with regards to being prey for avian and fish species, as well as helping with pollination processes.

=== Termites (Isoptera) ===
Termites are insects that are part of the order Isoptera and are a eusocial group. Economically, termites pose harm to agriculture and crops. They have the tendency to attack a crop at any phase of its development, and result in loss of crop yield and success. In Africa, crop yield loss was once recorded as 100% due to the presence and persistence of termites.

Crops are not the only kind of plants that termites persist in. Trees in some areas of the world such as Brazil and China have observed an increase in tree replanting activity, as the local termite populations would damage structural components of the trees, allowing them to not be economically valuable and trigger plant death. Plant death alone can cause ecological disturbances to organisms that live in or around them, as well as providing a food source for them, if it is a flowering plant that develops fruits. Trees are used for sources of paper, buildings, furniture, household items, and many more, and termites affect the creation of these types of modernized items.

Termites affect infrastructure and buildings. They can burrow and cause infrastructure to become weaker by creating cracks and holes in the supporting material, causing their deterioration. In 2016, Vietnam recorded $1.7 million dollars in repair of private owned houses and buildings.

In 2012, approximately $40 billion dollars was lost globally due to the economic damage caused by termites.

=== Additional insects ===
The Eastern tent caterpillar (Malacosoma americanum) contains a toxin called prunasin that impacts livestock, specifically horses. The caterpillars let out their seta in the animals' forage and when ingested, will pierce the gastrointestinal wall and get through the bloodstream to the reproductive system. This process causes Mare Reproductive Loss Syndrome. The illness facilitated by these insects can induce abortions and has caused up to 300-500 million dollars of loss in Kentucky from 2001-2002.

Blister beetles (family Meloidae) contain a compound called cantharidin, which causes blistering. The blister beetles can be ingested by livestock via the mouth by hiding in hay or forage. When they are ingested, they cause injuries in the digestive system to the host. The insects can also damage crops and garden plants.

Female bot flies (family Oestridae) often lay their eggs on porter flies that will bring their eggs to a host, either human or livestock, and will allow them to hatch. In humans, it causes large and painful bites. In cows, it can cause external damage. Cows' skins are used for leather, and when the bot fly bites cause holes in the skin, it has a high economic cost. Bot flies also affect horses. In Kentucky, the Kentucky derby community relies on horses, and if they ingest the eggs or have porter flies lay eggs on them, it can cause issues with digestion and render them not available for Kentucky derby. Bot flies are common within farms and livestock, as well as in domestic animals, and their potential to create warbles on the animals' skin and fur requires further research in preventing economic damage.

== Beneficial insects ==
=== Bees (Hymenoptera) and pollination ===
Honey is perhaps the most economically valuable product from insects. Beekeeping is a commercial enterprise in most parts of the world and many forest tribes have been dependent on honey as a major source of nutrition. Honeybees and bumblebees can also act as pollinators of crop species. Although pollination can be achieved during pollen transport via wind, a large amount is also achieved via insect, specifically bee transport. In 1986, there was an estimated 17,000 million worth of crops that were solely pollinated by insects in the United States.

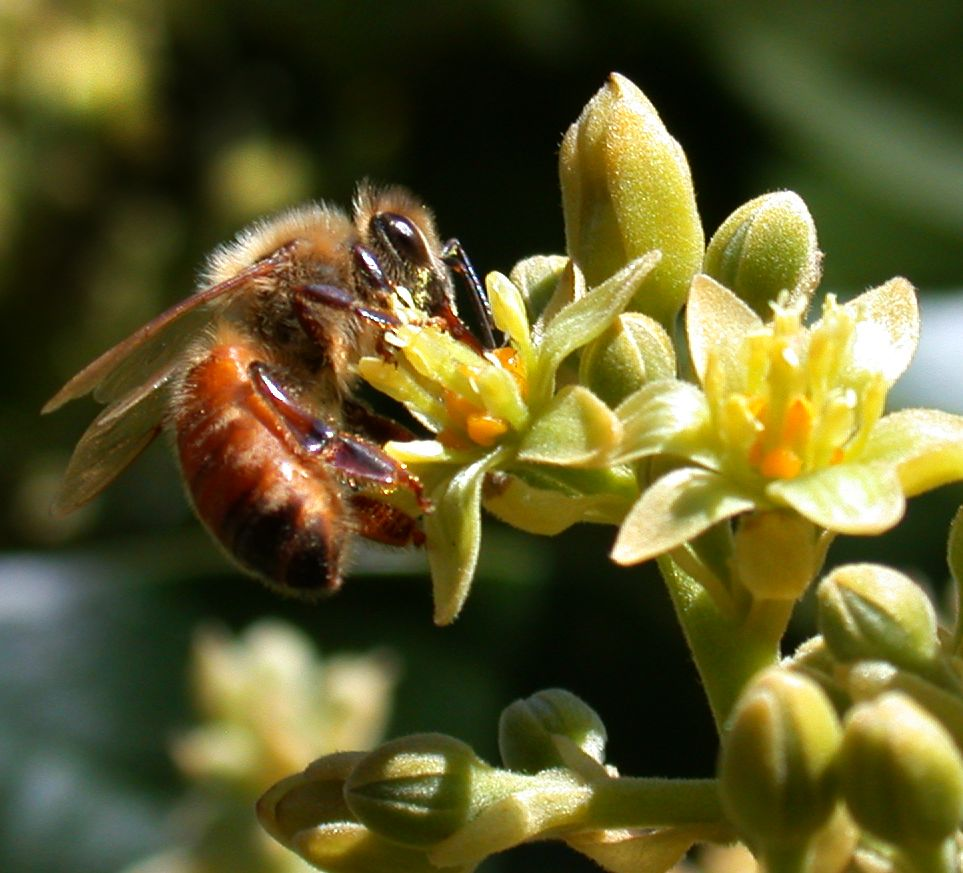
A honeybee, Apis mellifera, pollinates an avocado plant Persea americana.

Without the presence of honeybees, pollination of several different kinds of angiosperm plants would decrease the economic yield by 40% and the crop yield by 90%. Bees alone are responsible for pollinating approximately 16% of the world's angiosperms. Plants that were not dependent on pollination via insects had a production value of 151 euros, whereas the plants that were dependent on pollination via insects had a production value of over twice that amount at 761 euros. Apart from crops, bees have profound impacts on aiding disadvantageous natural processes like erosion, and allow a desired property to up its value by contributing to the localities and surrounding ecosystems by pollinating plants and maintaining the food chain.

=== Entomophagy ===
In efforts to minimize global malnourishment and food limitations and insecurity, the prospect of entomophagy has been introduced. Developing edible insects as a source of food when other forms of protein such as poultry and bovine are less available and less sustainable has been explored. Insects explored for food and feed include crickets, grasshoppers, caterpillars, ants, dragonflies, scale insects, flies, and more.

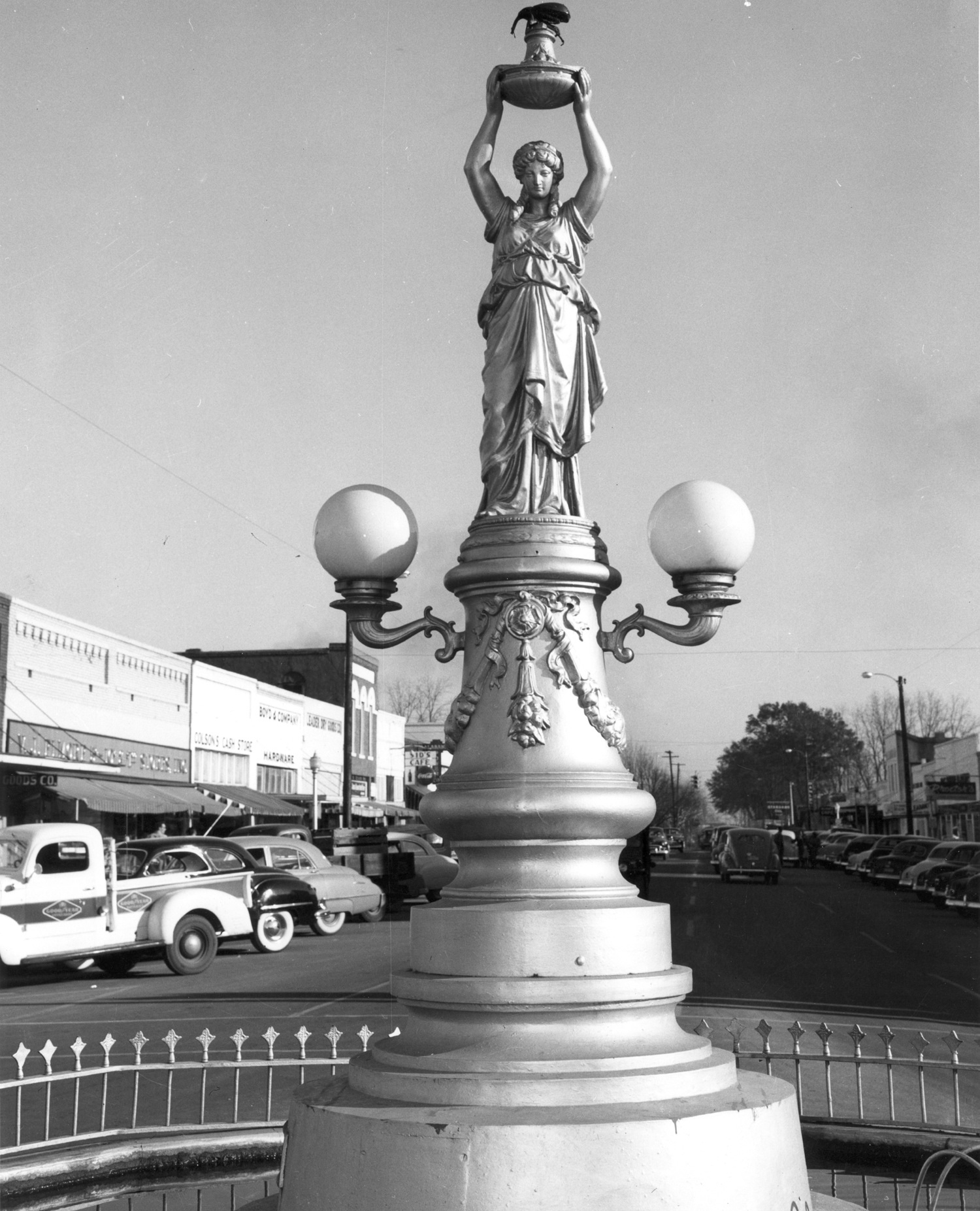
Boll Weevil Monument, erected by the citizens of Enterprise, Alabama to honour the pest that ended their dependence on cotton, a poverty crop

Recent advances have shown that insects as a source of nutrients and food can be economically valuable, less detrimental to the environment, and nutritionally valuable. Initial results of recent studies have recorded that insect production and farming for feed has been shown to emit less greenhouse gases into the atmosphere than that of beef production, and matched that of chicken production. These results also showed that insect production alone requires less resources than other sources of protein. 80% of insects, specifically crickets are suitable for consumption whereas 40%, 55%, and 55% of cows, pigs, and chickens are suitable for consumption, respectively. Crickets have also been found to have high amounts of amino acids such as leucine, lysine, threonine, histidine, and more. For 1 kg of insects, they require approximately 40 $m^2$ of land, 1.5 kg of feed, and 2500L of water to produce and farm, whereas cows require approximately 250 $m^2$ of land, 10 kg of feed, and 15.5L of water to produce and farm.

Traditional remedies for allergies, digestive issues, cough and cold, malaria, and other related diseases have included insect consumption as a form of treatment, before modernization. Honeybees, Apis mellifera, produce a variety of medically beneficial products including propolis, which has an important role in reducing the risk of cardiovascular diseases. Honey and bee pollen are also known to have antibacterial and anti-inflammatory agents to combat illnesses.

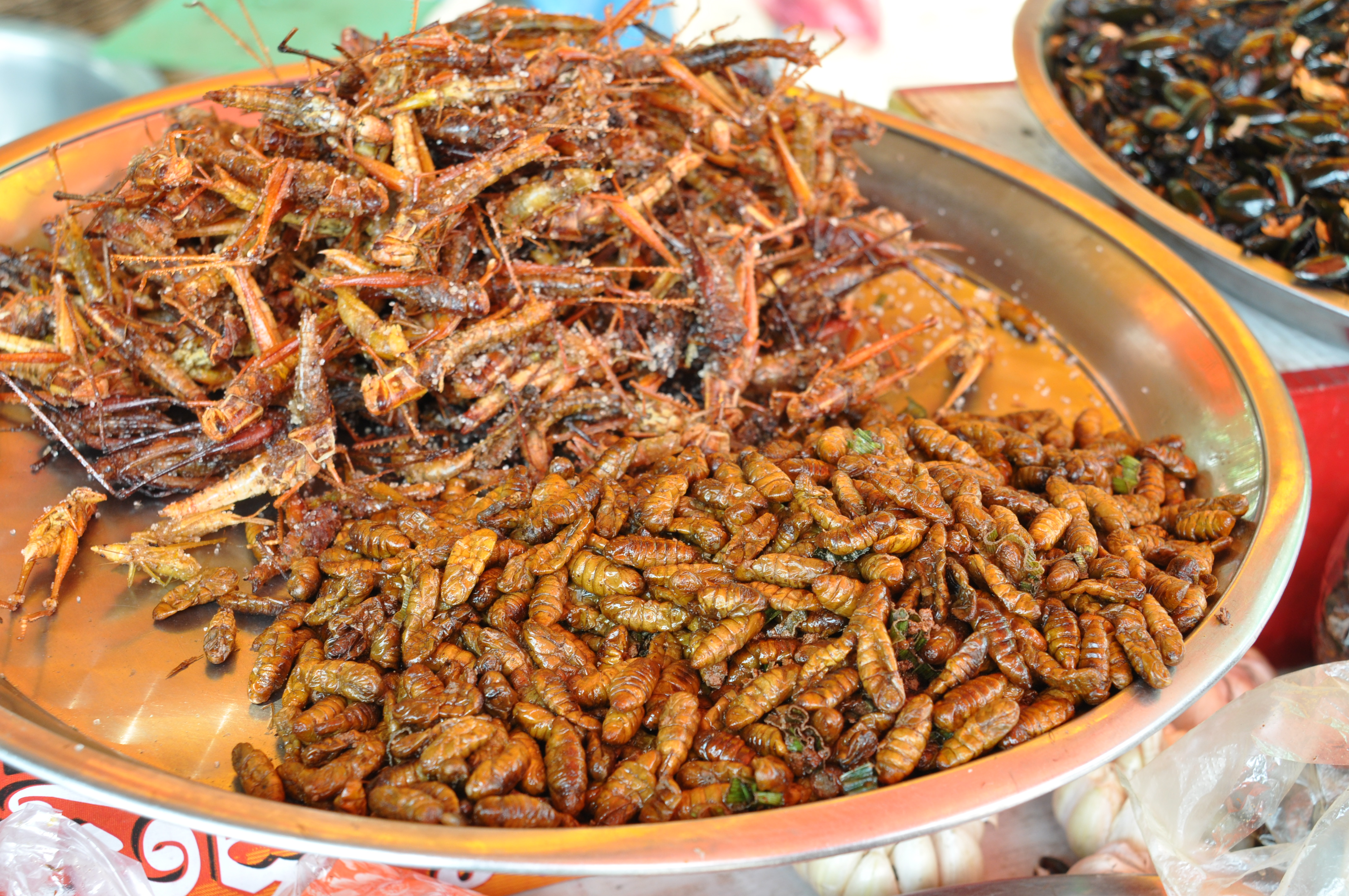
Fried crickets and bamboo worms in Cambodia. Insects for feed are typically dried and fried, and oftentimes the limbs are taken off during the cleaning process. The chef who fried the imaged insects stated that they were grown, propagated, and cleaned in a safe farm environment.

The idea of insects as human food is widely practiced in traditional societies and has been proposed as a solution to meet the growing demand for food but has not gained widespread acceptance in the West. Insects can also be used in the forensic setting as well as in the medical veterinary setting. Some Diptera (flies) and Coleoptera (beetles) will urinate on a corpse to assess its time of death. Fly larvae can also be used to feed on living or dead tissue, and this technique is used to help treat wounds, called maggot therapy.

=== Entomotourism ===
Insects are sometimes involved in ecotourism, which specific to insects, can be defined as entomotourism. Entomotourism is insect-specific tourism. These can include butterfly exhibits, bee museums, nature and animal museums or zoos, and more. Popular global entomotourism sites can include the glow caves in New Zealand, the Butterfly Conservatory in Niagara Falls, and the Monarch Butterfly Biosphere Reserve in Mexico.

Entomotourism is related to economic benefits, as less economically developed countries may rely on ecotourism and entomotourism as a form of stable income. Entomotourism is thought to be an estimated multi-million-dollar industry.

=== Additional human benefits ===
Silk is extracted from both reared caterpillars as well as from the wild (producing wild silk). Sericulture deals with the techniques for efficient silkworm rearing and silk production. Although new fabric materials have substituted silk in many applications, it continues to be the material of choice for surgical sutures.

Lac was once extracted from scale insects but is now replaced by synthetic substitutes. The dye extracted from cochineal insects was similarly replaced by technological advances.
