= Taschenberg =

Taschenberg is a surname of German origin. People with that name include:

- Ernst Ludwig Taschenberg (1818–1898), German entomologist, father of Ernst Otto Wilhelm
- Ernst Otto Wilhelm Taschenberg (1854–1923), German entomologist, son of Ernst Ludwig

== See also ==
- Opernhaus am Taschenberg, a former theatre in Dresden, Saxony, Germany
- Taschenbergpalais, a grand hotel in Dresden, Germany
