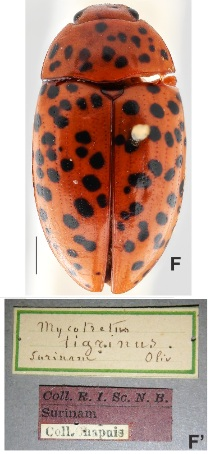
- Adult specimen from Suriname at RBINS

Scientific classification
- Kingdom: Animalia
- Phylum: Arthropoda
- Clade: Pancrustacea
- Class: Insecta
- Order: Coleoptera
- Suborder: Polyphaga
- Infraorder: Cucujiformia
- Family: Erotylidae
- Genus: Mycotretus
- Species: M. tigrinus

Binomial name
- Mycotretus tigrinus (Olivier, 1792)

Synonyms
- see text

= Mycotretus tigrinus =

Species of beetle

Mycotretus tigrinus is a Neotropical beetle species in the pleasing fungus beetle family (Erotylidae). Among its family, this species is placed in subfamily Tritominae, or – in taxonomic arrangements that prefer a more comprehensive subfamily Erotylinae – in tribe Tritomini of the Erotylinae.

This species, 5-8.5 mm long and 3-4.5 mm wide as adult, was placed in genus Erotylus by Guillaume-Antoine Olivier when he first described it in 1792. The type specimen seems to have been lost, and the type locality was not specified more precisely than "Surinam" – probably the Dutch colony of Suriname, but maybe some other part of the Guianas. Subsequent authors described the same beetle species as supposedly new several times:

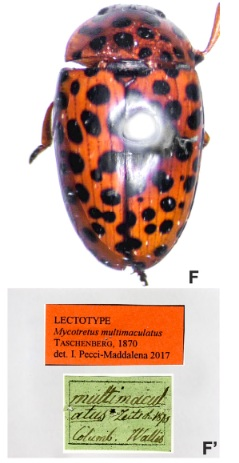
Type specimen of "M.multimaculatus", with Taschenberg's original green label

Ernst Germar in 1824 established the name Erotylus conspersus, which was not realized by Duponchel in the following year, when he used the same name for the beetle now known as Iphiclus atrisignatus. Germar's type specimen also seems to be lost today, and his type locality was simply "Brasilia", i.e. the newly-independent Empire of Brazil. In 1842 Jean Lacordaire realized that Olivier's and Germar's beetle taxa referred to the same species. He synonymized them, and placed the species in his newly-established genus Mycotretus. In 1870, Ernst Taschenberg again described M.tigrinus as a new species, using the name Mycotretus multimaculatus. His lectotype specimen – designated as such in 2017 – is still extant at the ZNS; its collector name was given as "Wallis", and its origin was as imprecise as that of the previously described specimens, reading simply "Columb." (for the United States of Colombia). Its identity with M.tigrinus was only realized in the early 21st century. George Crotch in 1876 once again described a M.tigrinus specimen as a "new" species, using the name Mycotretus leopardus. He also separated a variety pardalis from the "typical" M.tigrinus. While the type specimen of the latter, said to be from Ecuador, was apparently lost before 1998, the lectotype of M. "leopardus" is in the UMZC collection. The handwriting on its label is somewhat hard to read (leopardus looks like leopardis), its locality is simply "Peru", and the collector is not noted. Paul Kuhnt synonymized it with M.tigrinus in 1911, but Crotch's pardalis was held to be a distinct subspecies until 2018, when it was again demoted to a mere variant with no taxonomic standing.

Specimen records of M.tigrinus exist from modern-day Colombia, Ecuador, Peru, Bolivia, Suriname, French Guiana, and northern Brazil. This beetle is thus attested from in and around the Amazon Basin, except in the north and south.

Invalid junior synonyms of M.tigrinus are:

- Erotylus conspersus Germar, 1824
- Erotylus tigrinus Olivier, 1792
- Mycotretus leopardis (lapsus)
- Mycotretus leopardus Crotch, 1876
- Mycotretus multimaculatus Taschenberg, 1870
- Mycotretus tigrinus pardalis Crotch, 1876
- Mycotretus tigrinus var. pardalis Crotch, 1876
