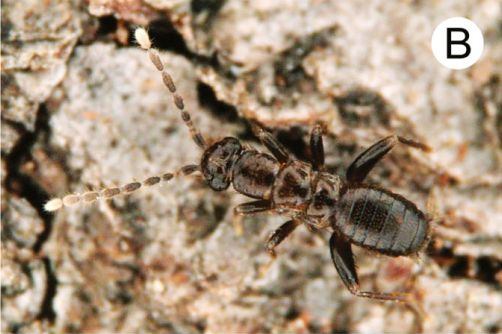
- Spermozoros impolitus

Scientific classification
- Kingdom: Animalia
- Phylum: Arthropoda
- Clade: Pancrustacea
- Class: Insecta
- Order: Zoraptera
- Family: Zorotypidae
- Subfamily: Spermozorinae
- Genus: Spermozoros; Kocarek, Horka & Kundrata, 2020

= Spermozoros =

Genus of insects

Spermozoros is a genus of angel insects in the family Zorotypidae. There are six described species in Spermozoros, transferred to Spermozoros from the genus Zorotypus as a result of research published in 2020.

== Species ==
These species belong to the genus Spermozoros:

- Spermozoros asymmetricus (Kocarek, 2017) – Brunei
- Spermozoros huangi (Yin & Li, 2017) – China (Yunnan)
- Spermozoros impolitus (Mashimo, Engel, Dallai, Beutel & Machida, 2013) – Peninsular Malaysia
- Spermozoros medoensis (Huang, 1976) – China (Tibet)
- Spermozoros sinensis (Huang, 1974) – China (Tibet)
- Spermozoros weiweii (Wang, Li & Cai, 2016) – Borneo (Sabah)
