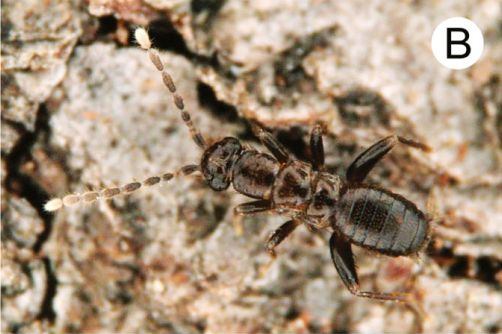

Scientific classification
- Kingdom: Animalia
- Phylum: Arthropoda
- Clade: Pancrustacea
- Class: Insecta
- Order: Zoraptera
- Family: Zorotypidae
- Genus: Spermozoros
- Species: S. impolitus

Binomial name
- Spermozoros impolitus (Mashimo, Engel, Dallai, Beutel & Machida, 2013)

Synonyms
- Zorotypus impolitus Mashimo et al., 2013

= Spermozoros impolitus =

Species of insect

Spermozoros impolitus is a species of insect in the order Zoraptera.

This species was formerly a member of the genus Zorotypus.

== Natural history ==
Zorotypus impolitus was discovered in the Genting highlands of peninsular Malaysia and has been described by Mashimo et al. (2013). Individual Spermozoros impolitus resemble termites in appearance. They are found in decaying tree trunks and eat fungi.

== Reproduction ==
Most Zorapterans copulate during mating, but in S. impolitus the male has evolved a distinct form of mating behaviour in which he attaches several tiny spermatophores on the female's abdomen during the mating process. The female initiates the intercourse by advancing towards the male and brushing her antennae against the male's body. If the male ground louse is aroused, it moves behind the female and carries out a mating display which comprises lowering the head, vibrating the antennae and moving back and forth repeatedly. The mating concludes with the male moving under the female and attaching the spermatophores to her abdomen. She then shifts the spermatophores into her reproductive tract.

Such external transfer of sperm is also found in ancient wingless groups like springtails, but in their case, the male deposits its spermatophore on the ground from where the female lifts the sac for transfer to its genital aperture.

This species is also notable because its spermatophore is only 0.1 millimetres (0.0039 in) long, among the smallest in the arthropod world but the single sperm it contains is 3 micrometres (0.00012 in) wide and 3 millimetres (0.12 in) long almost as long as the insect itself. This is the only known insect in the world to feature a giant single spermatozoon. The giant spermatozoon is hypothesized to have evolved in this manner so as to act like a mating plug.
