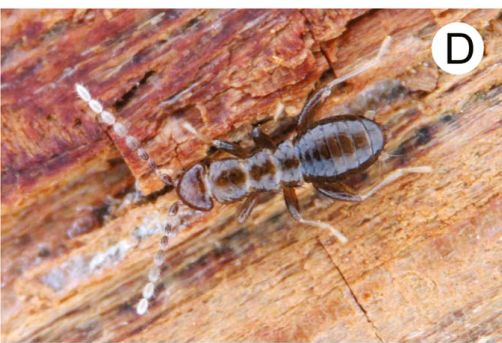
- Spiralizoros sp. observed in Brunei

Scientific classification
- Kingdom: Animalia
- Phylum: Arthropoda
- Clade: Pancrustacea
- Class: Insecta
- Order: Zoraptera
- Family: Spiralizoridae
- Subfamily: Spiralizorinae
- Genus: Spiralizoros; Kocarek, Horka & Kundrata, 2020

= Spiralizoros =

Genus of zoraptera

Spiralizoros is a genus of zorapterans in the family Spiralizoridae. There are about eight described species in Spiralizoros. The species of this genus were transferred from the genus Zorotypus as a result of research published in 2020.

== Species ==
These species belong to the genus Spiralizoros:

- Spiralizoros buxtoni (Karny, 1932) – Samoa
- Spiralizoros caudelli (Karny, 1923) – Peninsular Malaysia, Sumatra
- Spiralizoros cervicornis (Mashimo, Yoshizawa & Engel, 2013) – Peninsular Malaysia, Borneo
- Spiralizoros ceylonicus (Silvestri, 1913) – Sri Lanka
- Spiralizoros hainanensis (Yin & Li, 2015) – China (Hainan)
- Spiralizoros magnicaudelli (Mashimo, Engel, Dallai, Beutel & Machida, 2013) – Peninsular Malaysia, Borneo
- Spiralizoros philippinensis (Gurney, 1938) – Philippines
- Spiralizoros silvestrii (Karny, 1927) – Indonesia (Mentawai Islands)
