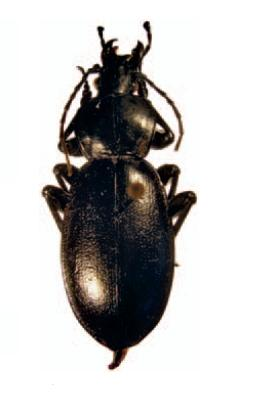

Scientific classification
- Domain: Eukaryota
- Kingdom: Animalia
- Phylum: Arthropoda
- Class: Insecta
- Order: Coleoptera
- Suborder: Adephaga
- Family: Carabidae
- Genus: Carabus
- Species: C. piochardi

Binomial name
- Carabus piochardi Géhin, 1883

= Carabus piochardi =

Species of beetle

Carabus piochardi is a species of ground beetle from family Carabidae. They are black coloured, and are very similar to Carabus punctatus.
