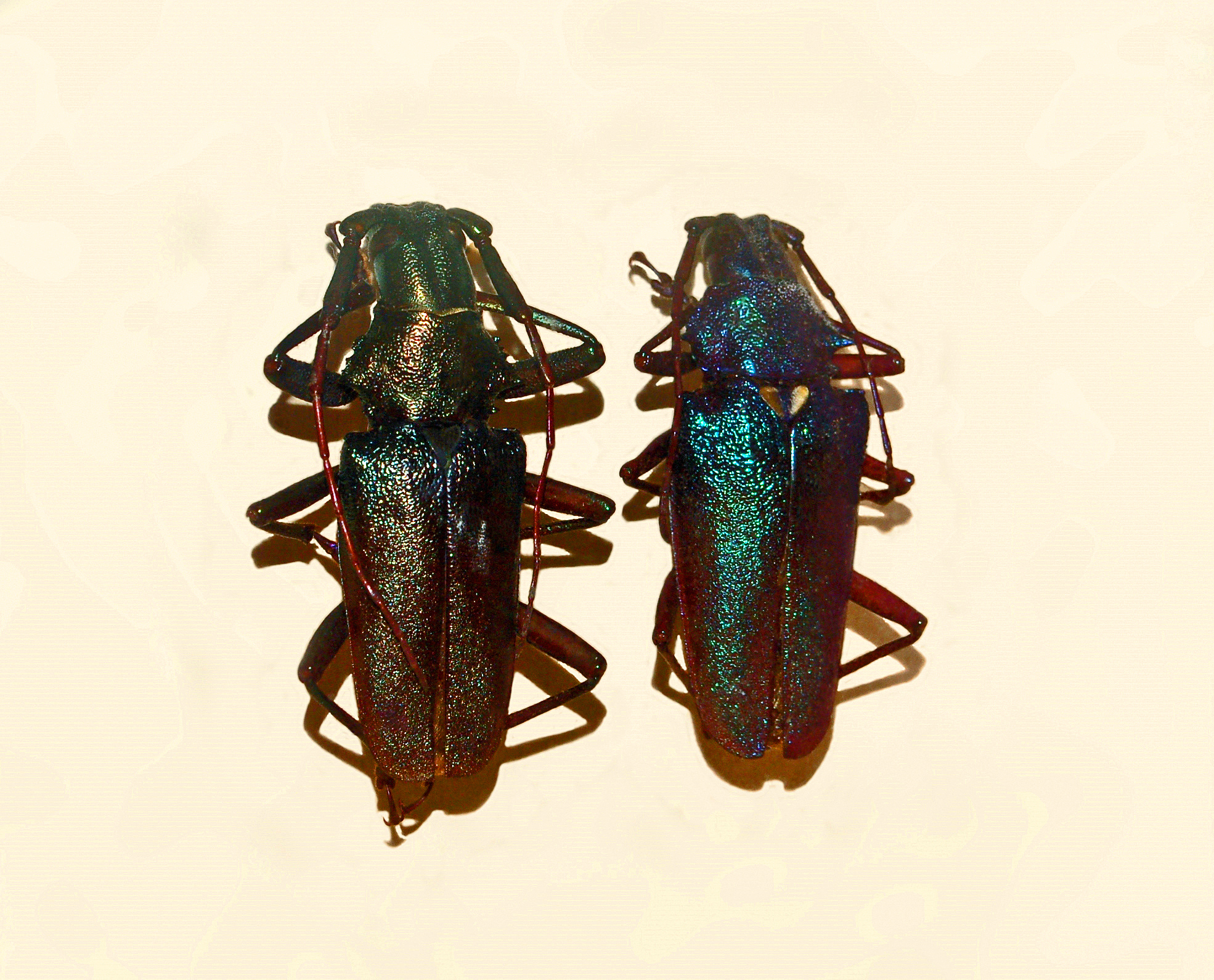
- Male and female from Panama

Scientific classification
- Domain: Eukaryota
- Kingdom: Animalia
- Phylum: Arthropoda
- Class: Insecta
- Order: Coleoptera
- Suborder: Polyphaga
- Infraorder: Cucujiformia
- Family: Cerambycidae
- Genus: Scatopyrodes
- Species: S. angustus

Binomial name
- Scatopyrodes angustus (Taschenberg, 1870)

Synonyms
- Mallaspis praecellens Bates, 1871; Pyrodes angustus Taschenberg, 1870

= Scatopyrodes angustus =

Species of beetle

Scatopyrodes angustus is a species of beetle belonging to the family Cerambycidae.

== Description ==
These large beetles are sexually dimorphic. The males are greenish-brown, while the females are much larger than males and have a more evidently green reflection. They are commonly nocturnal and borers whose larvae feed on rotting wood or roots.

== Distribution ==
This species can be found in Colombia, Costa Rica, Ecuador and Panama.
