= Zorotypus amazonensis =

Scientific classification
- Domain: Eukaryota
- Kingdom: Animalia
- Phylum: Arthropoda
- Class: Insecta
- Order: Zoraptera
- Family: Zorotypidae
- Genus: Zorotypus
- Species: Z. amazonensis

Binomial name
- Zorotypus amazonensis Rafael and Engel, 2006

Species of insect

Zorotypus amazonensis is a species of insect in the genus Zorotypus. It is found in the Amazon, in the Brazilian state of Amazonas. Males possess features that distinguish them from related species. The male cerci is elongated, curved, and studded with three stiff setae along inner margins allowing for a "clasperlike" appearance.
