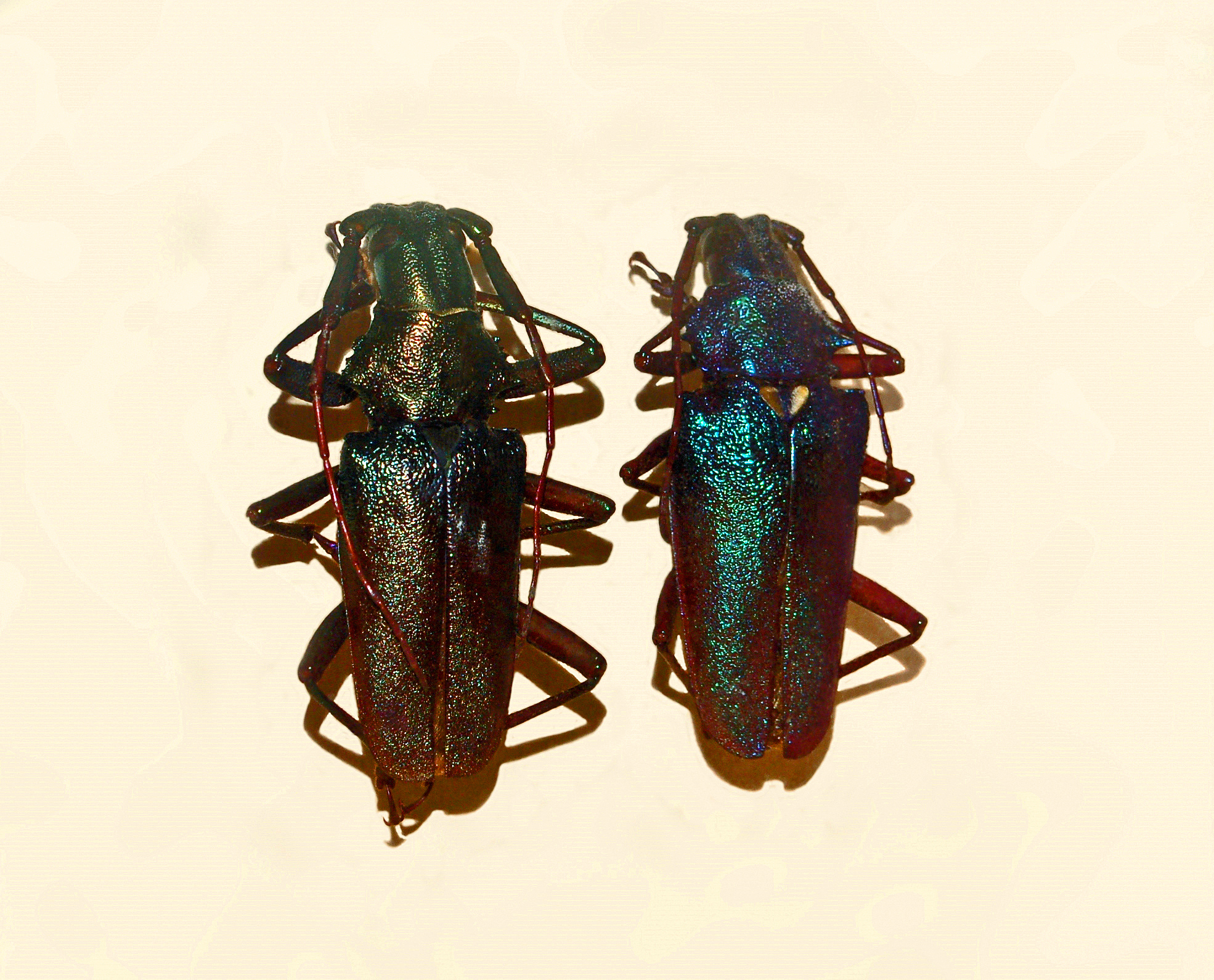
- Scatopyrodes angustus

Scientific classification
- Domain: Eukaryota
- Kingdom: Animalia
- Phylum: Arthropoda
- Class: Insecta
- Order: Coleoptera
- Suborder: Polyphaga
- Infraorder: Cucujiformia
- Family: Cerambycidae
- Subfamily: Prioninae
- Tribe: Mallaspini
- Genus: Scatopyrodes; Galileo & Martins, 1992

= Scatopyrodes =

Genus of beetles

Scatopyrodes is a genus of beetles belonging to the family Cerambycidae.

== List of species ==
- Scatopyrodes angustus (Taschenberg, 1870)
- Scatopyrodes aspericornis Haller & Delahaye, 2018
- Scatopyrodes beltii (Bates, 1869)
- Scatopyrodes iris (Bates, 1884)
- Scatopyrodes lampros (Bates, 1884)
- Scatopyrodes longiceps (White, 1853)
- Scatopyrodes moreletii (Lucas, 1851)
- Scatopyrodes samiatus Galileo & Martins, 1992
- Scatopyrodes tenuicornis (White, 1850)
- Scatopyrodes trichostethus (Bates, 1879)
- Scatopyrodes vietus Galileo & Martins, 1992
