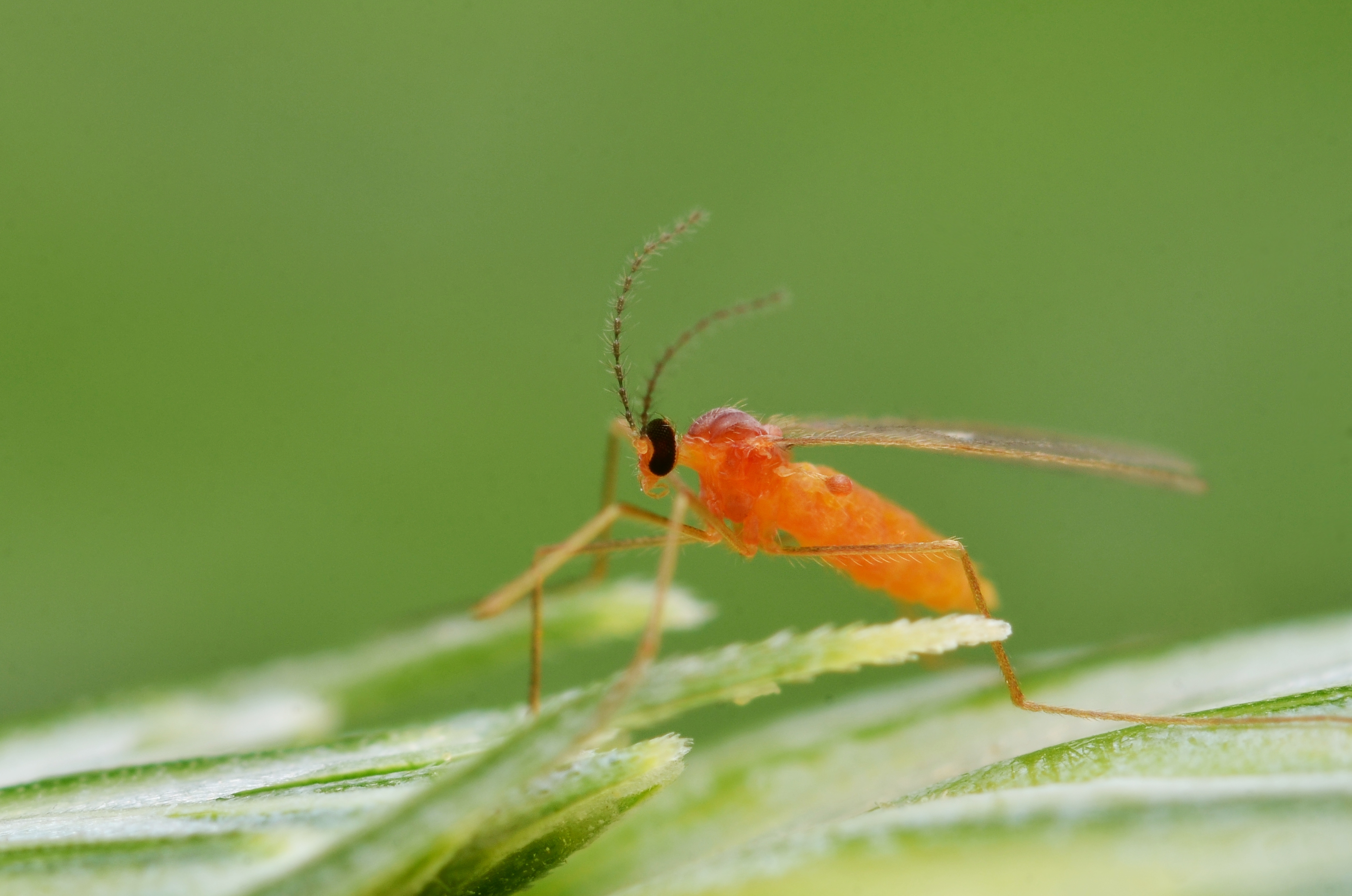

Scientific classification
- Kingdom: Animalia
- Phylum: Arthropoda
- Class: Insecta
- Order: Diptera
- Family: Cecidomyiidae
- Genus: Sitodiplosis
- Species: S. mosellana

Binomial name
- Sitodiplosis mosellana (Géhin, 1857)

Synonyms
- Cecidomyia mosellana Géhin

= Sitodiplosis mosellana =

Species of fly

Sitodiplosis mosellana, the wheat midge or orange wheat blossom midge, is a species of fly in the family Cecidomyiidae. It is found in the Holarctic, where it is a significant pest of wheat, triticale and rye.
