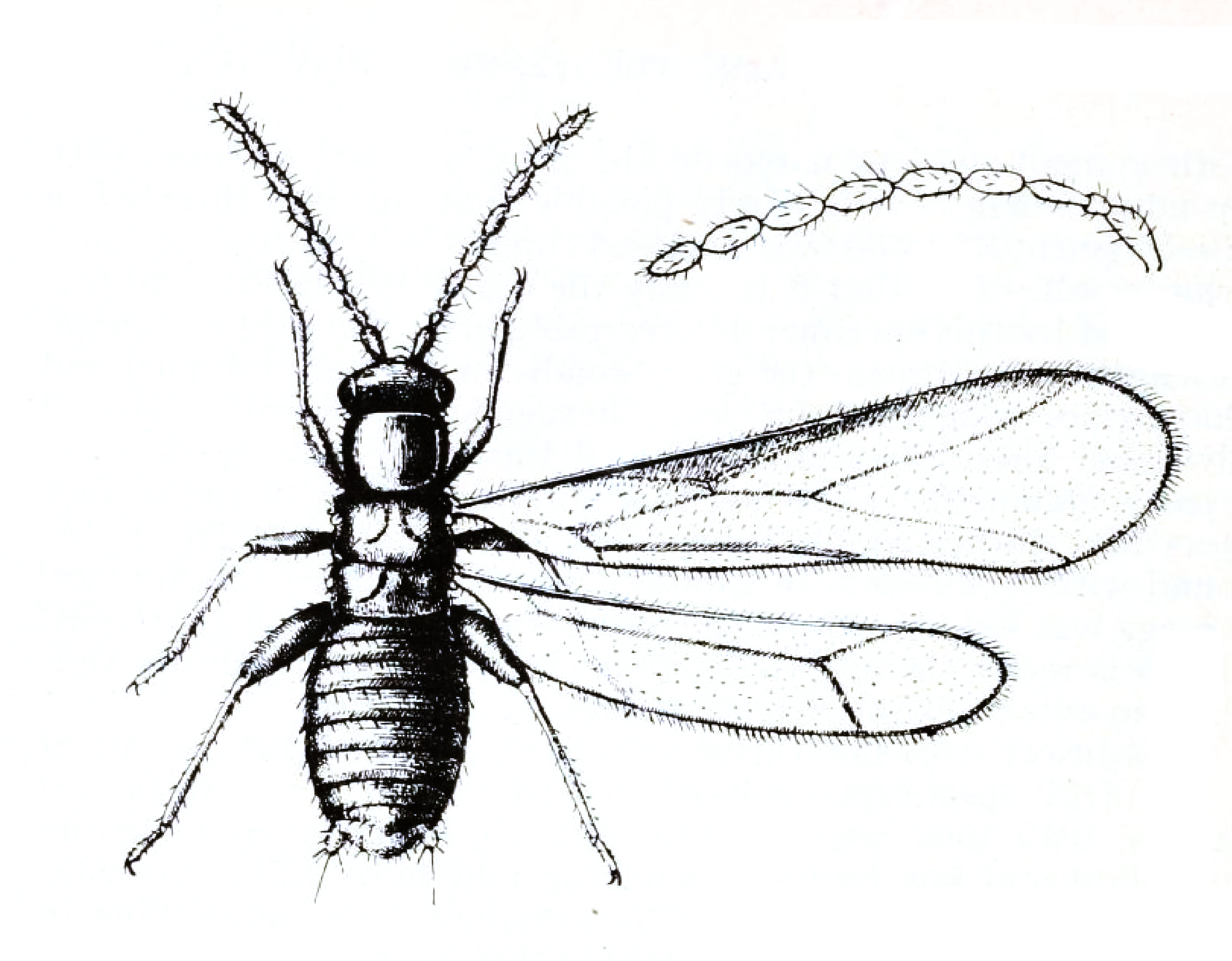
- Illustration of winged female

Scientific classification
- Kingdom: Animalia
- Phylum: Arthropoda
- Clade: Pancrustacea
- Class: Insecta
- Order: Zoraptera
- Family: Zorotypidae
- Subfamily: Zorotypinae
- Genus: Usazoros; Kukalová-Peck & Peck, 1993
- Species: U. hubbardi

Binomial name
- Usazoros hubbardi (Caudell, 1918)

Synonyms
- Zorotypus hubbardi Caudell, 1918

= Usazoros =

Genus of insects

Usazoros hubbardi, commonly known as Hubbard's angel insect, is a species of insect in the order Zoraptera. It is native to southern North America and in modern times has expanded its range northwards into the eastern United States, where it lives in piles of sawdust, whereas in the hotter part of its range it lives under the bark of decomposing logs. It was named after the American entomologist Henry Guernsey Hubbard, who discovered the insect in the United States. It is also the largest known species of angel insect in the world.

== Description ==
Adults are about 3 mm (0.12 in) in length and have nine segments in their antennae, while nymphs have eight. There are winged and wingless forms in both sexes of the species. The winged forms have compound eyes and ocelli, but these are lacking in wingless forms. Like termites, the winged forms sometimes shed their wings.

The wings, when present, are membranous and paddle-shaped, the fore wings being larger than the hind wings. The hind legs have distinctive stiff spines on the underside of the femurs. The abdomen has eleven segments, with a pair of short cerci at the tip. Nymphs are white, gradually changing to brownish as they grow.

== Distribution and habitat ==
Native to southwest North America, Usazoros hubbardi has expanded its range northwards into the United States. This has probably occurred through the movement of winged females, possibly overwintering in piles of sawdust. Its normal habitat is under the loose bark of decomposing logs.

Along with Centrozoros snyderi from southern Florida, Hubbard's angel insect is one of only two members of this order to be found in the United States, the rest of the order being largely tropical in distribution. Hubbard's angel insect has been detected in Alabama, Arkansas, Delaware, District of Columbia, Florida, Georgia, Illinois, Indiana, Iowa, Kansas, Kentucky, Louisiana, Maryland, Mississippi, Missouri, North Carolina, Ohio, Oklahoma, Pennsylvania, South Carolina, Tennessee, Texas, Virginia and West Virginia.

== Ecology ==
Hubbard's angel insects are gregarious and are usually found under bark in small groups. They feed on fungal spores and hyphae, and scavenge for dead mites, nematodes and other small invertebrates. They often groom themselves or each other, using their mouthparts to clean their own antennae, legs and hind part of the abdomen, while other individuals clean the thorax and front of the abdomen. This allogrooming may be important to help avoid the fungal attacks that kill many zorapterans. On being disturbed by removal of the bark, the insects scuttle rapidly away to hide in crevices. The small pale insects may be confused with termites, but move much faster.

When conditions are suitable for the insects, only wingless females are present, which breed by parthenogenesis. Batches of eggs are concealed under chewed food particles and guarded by the mother. The eggs hatch after a few weeks and the nymphs moult four or five times as they grow. Under adverse conditions, such as when the insects become overcrowded or run out of food, the females lay eggs that hatch into nymphs that develop into winged males and winged females. These fly off in due course to search for more suitable places to colonise. On arrival, they shed their wings and mate repeatedly. During courtship, the males offer the females droplets of a liquid secreted by glands on their heads.
