= Matthew Cooke (entomologist) =

Matthew Cooke (1829–1887) was an Irish immigrant to the United States who pioneered economic entomology in California.

Born in Bushmills, County Antrim, on February 16, 1829, Matthew Cookie immigrated to the United States in 1850. Employed as a youth in the Public Works Department in Bushmills, he was promoted to Superintendent of Works.

In California he first took up a post at the Water Works in Scaremento and in 1875 became a fruit box manufacturer. His business suffered badly when the Codling moth appeared in the state, devastating the apple crop. He studied entomology to solve the problem and by 1879 was able to address the State Fruit Growers on the Codling moth and other serious pests, including those of the important wine crop. In 1881 he was appointed Chief Executive Horticultural and Health Officer of California and drew up quarantine regulations relating to insects. The "cherry fruit sawfly" Hoplocampa cookei was named for him by W. T. Clarcke.

He died at Sacramento on August 25, 1887, California's first economic entomologist.

== Similarities with others ==
The Matthew Cooke Entomological Chart shows similarities with those produced by Robert Patterson in Belfast. Patterson charts were widely used in the U.S.A.

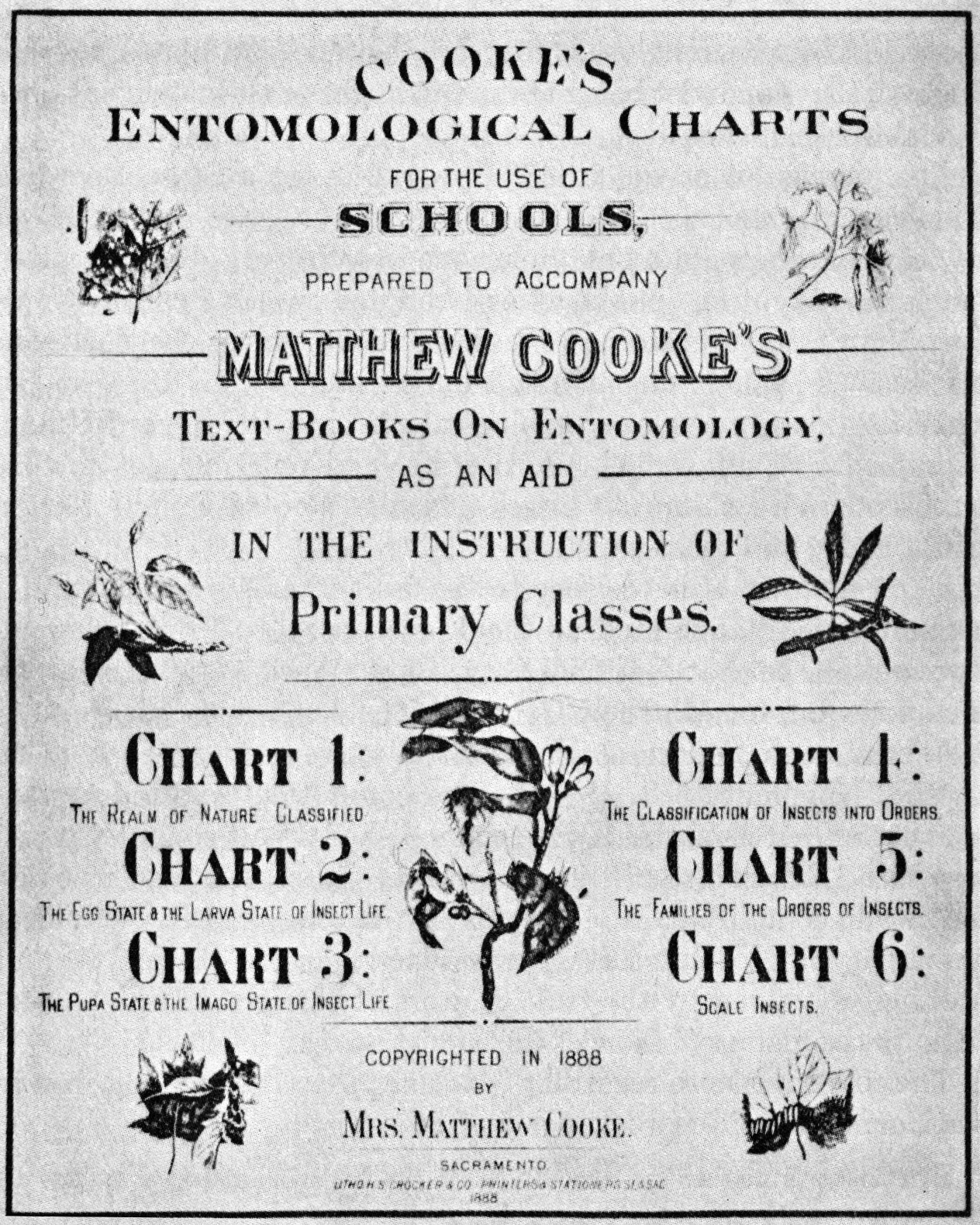
Matthew Cook Entomological Chart

== Works ==
He wrote numerous pamphlets and articles (mostly published in the Pacific Rural Press and the Sacramento Daily Record-Union).

- Injurious Insects of the Orchard, Vineyard, Field, Garden, Conservatory, Household, Storehouse, Domestic Animals, etc. with remedies for their extermination
- Treatise on the Insects Injurious to Fruit and Fruit Trees of the State of California, and Remedies Recommended for Their Extermination. Sacramento: State Office: J. D. Young, Supt. State Printing, 1881.
- Insects, Injurious and Beneficial, Their Natural History and Classification; For the Use of Fruit Growers, Vine Growers, Farmers, Gardeners and Schools. H. S. Crocker & Co. Sacramento. 1883.
- Charts on general entomology and pest insects, particularly those of fruit trees for farmers and schools.
