= Charles French (entomologist) =

Australian naturalist (1842–1933)

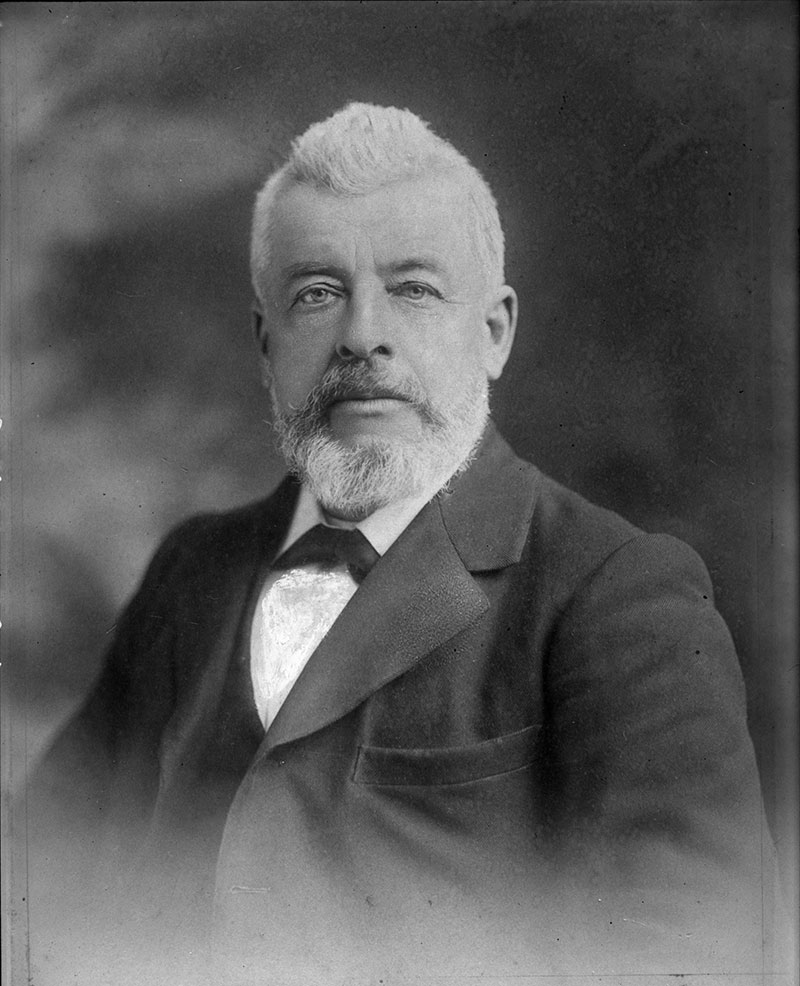

Charles French (10 September 1842 – 21 May 1933) was an Australian horticulturist, naturalist, entomologist and plant/seed collector who made significant contributions to economic entomology. French was the first economic entomologist in Australia and served as Government Entomologist in Victoria from 1889.

== Early life ==
French was born in Lewisham, Kent, England, the son of John French (died 1848) and Ellen, née Tucker. Ellen remarried and the young French moved to Melbourne with his family in 1852. For some years he worked as a gold digger in Bendigo. They settled in Cheltenham, a suburb of Melbourne.

== Career ==
French became interested in natural history and was apprenticed to a nurseryman at James Scott's nursery, Hawthorn. French became a manager of Burgie's nursery in East Melbourne (South Yarra nurseries) where he later met Ferdinand von Mueller, director of the Royal Botanic Gardens, Melbourne. In 1865 Mueller appointed French as a plant propagator to the staff at the Gardens.

In 1873 William Guilfoyle was appointed curator of the Gardens and French was placed in charge of fern propagation in the nursery complex.

French had resumed his interest in insects in 1860. In 1874 he co-authored an article on timber-boring insects which appeared in the annual report of the Department of Agriculture. This is considered the first publication on economic entomology in Victoria. He suggested the use of nicotine (tobacco water) to control woolly aphids in planting material. Four further parts were published by 1911.

== Late life and legacy ==
French died in Malvern, Melbourne, on 21 May 1933; he was survived by his third wife, a son and daughter from the first marriage and a daughter from his second marriage.

== Works ==
- Handbook of the destructive insects of Victoria; Volumes I-V 1891–1911; (Volume VI, with text and coloured plates, was prepared but never published.)

== Other sources ==
- E. E. Pescott, The Victorian Naturalist, July 1933; The Cyclopedia of Victoria, 1903; The Argus, Melbourne, 23 May 1933.
- J. H. Willis, Botanical Pioneers in Victoria (Melbourne, 1949); R. T. M. Pescott, History of the Royal Botanic Gardens, Melbourne (manuscript, privately held).
