= Zorotypus absonus =

Zorotypus absonus Temporal range: Burdigalian

Scientific classification
- Kingdom: Animalia
- Phylum: Arthropoda
- Clade: Pancrustacea
- Class: Insecta
- Order: Zoraptera
- Family: Zorotypidae
- Genus: Zorotypus
- Species: †Z. absonus

Binomial name
- †Zorotypus absonus Engel, 2008

Synonyms
- Zorotypus confirmans Scheven, 1990 (nomen nudum et invalidum)

Extinct species of insect

Zorotypus absonus is an extinct species of insect in the order Zoraptera that lived during the Burdigalian age of the Miocene epoch. It was described from a fossil of an alate male found in Dominican amber; the specimen is deposited in Joachim Scheven's private collection at his "Lebendige Vorwelt" museum in Hagen, Germany.

== History of research ==
The species was first discussed by Joachim Scheven in a paper published in the proceedings for the second International Conference on Creationism, which took place in the summer of 1990. Scheven named the species "Zorotypus confirmans" and provided figures for the species, but no characters were provided to differentiate it from others; Scheven claimed that "Z. confirmans" was indistinguishable from living species of Zorotypus. In 2008, Michael S. Engel validated the species using Scheven's figures, giving a diagnosis differentiating the species from other species of Zoraptera described from Dominican amber, and named the species Zorotypus absonus. According to Engel, the name "Zorotypus confirmans" cannot be considered available or valid under the International Code of Zoological Nomenclature, because Scheven did not provide characters to differentiate the taxon (therefore he had not provided a species description) and had published the name in conference proceedings.

== Etymology ==
The specific name absonus is derived from the Latin word absonus, meaning "different", referring to the distinct difference between Z. absonus and both living and fossil species of Zoraptera. The epithet in Scheven's name for the species, confirmans, was derived from the Latin word confirmo, meaning "to make firm, establish, strengthen, confirm", in reference to Scheven's belief that the fossil provided confirmation that "all living things make their first appearance in the geological record as separate and finished organisms".

== Description and diagnosis ==
The fossil specimen is a winged male with a body length almost exactly 2 mm long. The species is similar to other members of the genus Zorotypus, but can be distinguished from other fossil species described from Dominican amber by the following combination of characters: in the antennae, the first flagellomere is slightly longer than the pedicel; the pronotum is broad and quadrate (about as wide as the head), and lacks crescentic ridges anteriorly; the forewing has a short radius vein, terminating just beyond the wing's midlength; in the hind wing, the stem of the media is present near the wing's base; in the legs, the femur of the hind leg has six ventral spines arranged in a continuous series, with the second spine from the base being the longest; the cerci are monomerous.
