= Carabus punctatus =

Scientific classification
- Domain: Eukaryota
- Kingdom: Animalia
- Phylum: Arthropoda
- Class: Insecta
- Order: Coleoptera
- Suborder: Adephaga
- Family: Carabidae
- Genus: Carabus
- Species: C. punctatus

Binomial name
- Carabus punctatus Castelnau, 1835

Species of beetle

Carabus punctatus is a species of ground beetle from the family Carabidae. They are black coloured and are very similar to Carabus piochardi.
