= Otto Taschenberg =

German entomologist (1854–1923)

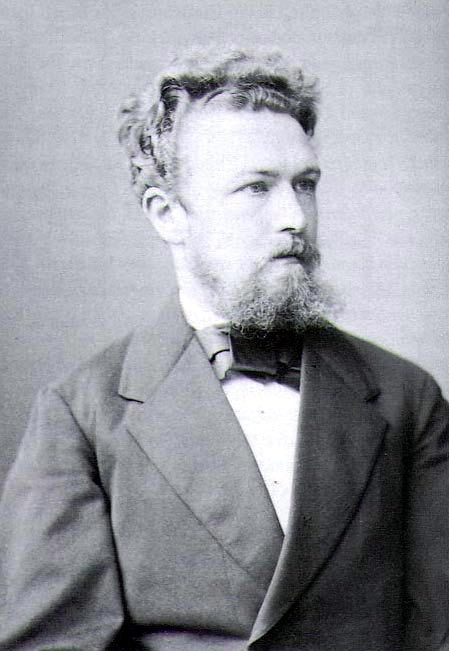
Taschenberg in 1880

Ernst Otto Wilhelm Taschenberg (23 March 1854, Halle – 20 March 1922, Halle) was a German entomologist who specialised in Hymenoptera.

He was the son of Ernst Ludwig Taschenberg. From 1879, after studying zoology at the universities of Leipzig and Halle, he worked alongside his father at the zoological institute in Halle. After his father's death, he became curator (Kustos) of the Institute's museum and professor of entomology.

He worked on all Hymenoptera but mainly Cynipidae. His collections are held by Halle University (Biozentrum).

In 1896–97, he edited the popular science journal Die Natur.

== Works ==
- Die Verwandlungen der Tiere. Freytag, Leipzig 1882 Digital edition by the University and State Library Düsseldorf
- Bilder aus dem Tierleben. Freytag, Leipzig 1885 Digital edition by the University and State Library Düsseldorf
- Die giftigen Tiere: Ein Lehrbuch für Zoologen, Mediziner und Pharmazeuten; mit 68 Abb . Enke, Stuttgart 1909 Digital edition by the University and State Library Düsseldorf
