= Sven Lampa =

Swedish entomologist (1839–1914)

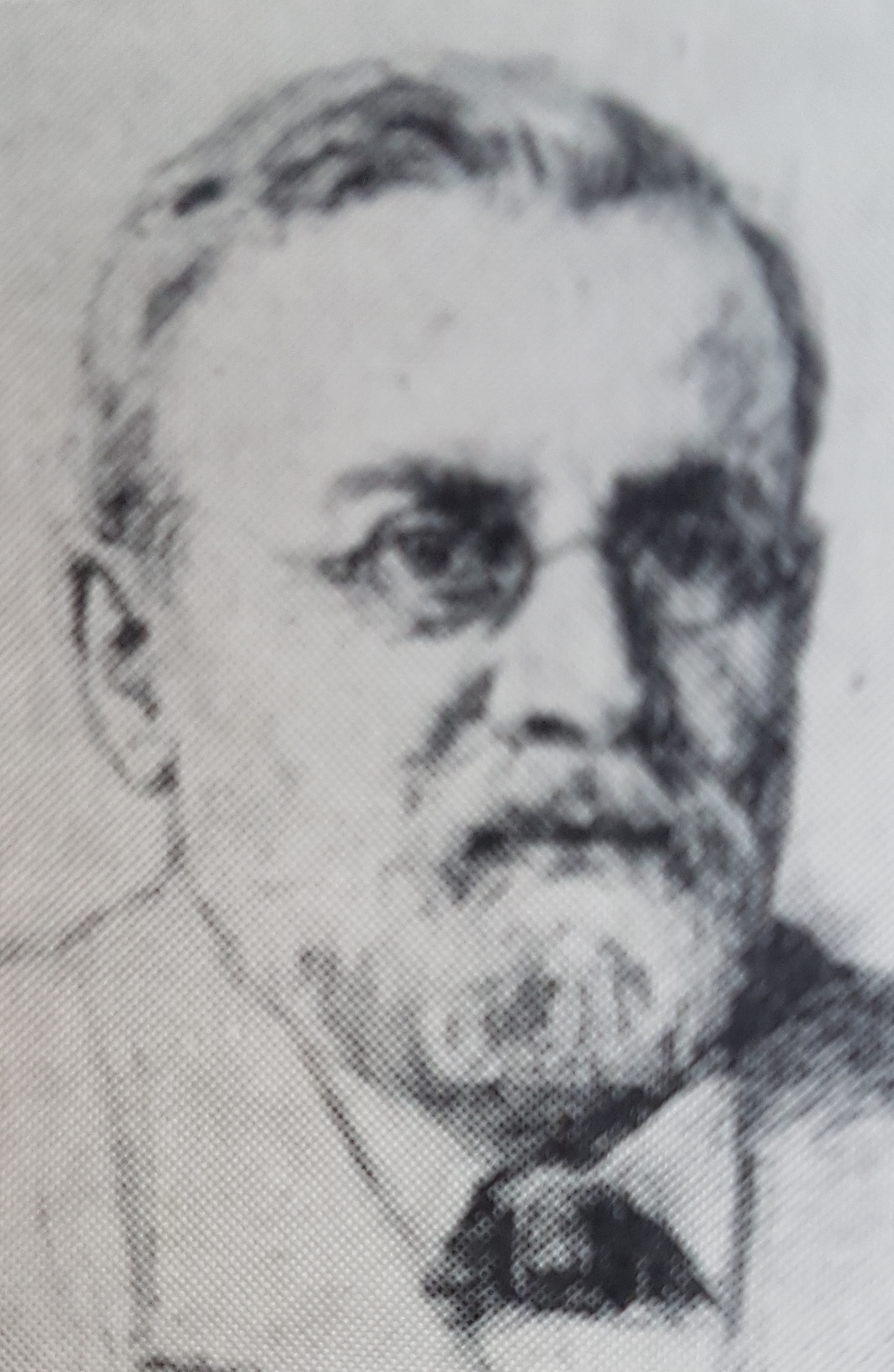
- Sven Lampa
- Born: 17 November 1839; Mariestad Municipality
- Died: 2 December 1914 (aged 75); Lidingön
- Occupation: Entomologist
- Known for: Specialized in Lepidoptera
- Notable work: Förteckning öfver Skandinaviens och Finlands Macrolepidoptera. Ent. Tidskr. 6(1–3): 1–137. 9 (1885).

Sven Lampa (17 November 1839, Mariestad Municipality – 2 December 1914, Lidingön) was a Swedish entomologist who specialised in Lepidoptera. He wrote Förteckning öfver Skandinaviens och Finlands Macrolepidoptera. Ent. Tidskr. 6(1–3): 1–137. 9 (1885).
