= Joseph Jean Baptiste Géhin =

French naturalist and entomologist

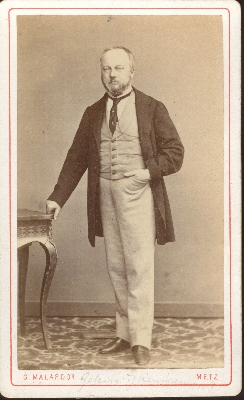
Joseph Jean Baptiste Géhin

Joseph Jean Baptiste Géhin (1816, Remiremont - 1889, Remiremont) was a French naturalist and entomologist who specialised in Coleoptera. He also studied Diptera. He was an apothecary in Metz.

His collections of Carabidae were purchased by René Oberthür and are now held by Muséum national d'histoire naturelle in Paris.Géhin described the wheat midge Sitodiplosis mosellana and several species of Carabidae.

He was a Member of Société entomologique de France and made significant contributions to economic entomology.

== Works ==
- Géhin J.B., et Fournel (1846) Catalogue des insectes Coléoptères des environs de Metz, Bull. Soc. Hist. nat. Moselle 1ère partie, 69-128, 3ème bull.; 2ème partie, 67-122, 4ème bull., 1846.
- Géhin J.B.(1855) Observation tératologique fait sur une vache exposée à la foire de Metz en 1855,Bull. Soc. Hist. nat. Moselle 7ème bull.1855 1-7.
- Géhin J.B.(1855) Coléoptères nouveaux ou peu connus: 1ère décade: Buprestiens Bull. Soc. Hist. nat. Moselle 7ème bull., 1855 53-65.
- Géhin J.B. (1855) Rapport sur le Species de Coléoptères trimères sécuripalpes du Mulsant,Bull. Soc. Hist. nat. Moselle 7ème bull., 1855 66-78.
- Géhin J.B.(1855) Catalogue synonymique des coccinelliens observés dans le département de la Moselle, 2ème Édition,Bull. Soc. Hist. nat. Moselle 7 ème bull., 1855 79-91.
- Géhin J.B.(1860) Note pour servir à l'histoire des insectes nuisibles dans le département de la Moselle: 1ère partie : Coléoptères : 57-159, Bull. Soc. Hist. nat. Moselle 8ème bull.; 2ème parties : Orthoptères, 9ème bull., 1860 109-330.
- Géhin J.B.(1860) Quelques essais de sériciculture dans le département de la Moselle,Bull. Soc. Hist. nat. Moselle 59-107
- Géhin J.B. (186-) Series entitled Notes pour servir à l'histoire des insectes nuisibles à l'agriculture, à l'horticulture et à la sylviculture das le département de la Moselle.
- Géhin J.B.(1866) Indication de quelques plantes phanérogames du département de la Moselle (omises dans la flore et non signalées dans certaines localités) Bull. Soc. Hist. nat. Moselle bull. 10ème, 157-165.
- Géhin J.B. (1868) Revision des poissons qui vivent dans les cours d'eau et dans les étangs du département de la Moselle, avec quelques considérations sur le darwinisme Bull. Soc. Hist. nat. Moselle 11ème bull., 1868 139-242.
- Géhin J.B.(1868) Catalogue des plantes cultivées en 1868-1869 au nouveau jardin botanique de Metz, à Frescatelly (904 espèces citées),Bull. Soc. Hist. nat. Moselle 11ème bull., 253-367,
- Géhin J.B.(1870) Note sur une variété de Chevesne commun et sur un cas pathologique observé sur un Barbeau de la Moselle, 1870 12 ème bull., 1870 31-37
- Géhin J.B.(1878/1880) Lettres pour servir à l'Histoire de la tribu des Carabiques Bull. Soc. Hist. nat. Moselle I et II: 101-148, 14 ème bull.; III et IV : 1-46, 15ème bull.; V : 57-84, 15ème bull; VI : 171-228, 15ème bull., 1878/1880
- Géhin J. B. (1876) Catalogue des Coléoptères Carabiques de la tribu des Carabides. Nancy.
- Géhin J. B.(1876) Lettres pour servir à l'histoire des insectes de la tribu des Carabides. Quatrième lettre. Bull. Soc. Hist. nat. Metz, 15 : 73-94.
- Géhin, J. B.(1879) Nouvelles lettres pour servir à l'histoire des insectes de la tribu des Carabides. Nancy. 24 pp.
- Géhin, J. B. et Haury Ch.(1885) Catalogue synonymique et systématique des Coléoptères de la tribu des Carabides. Remiremont & Prague.
