= Ernst Ludwig Taschenberg =

German entomologist

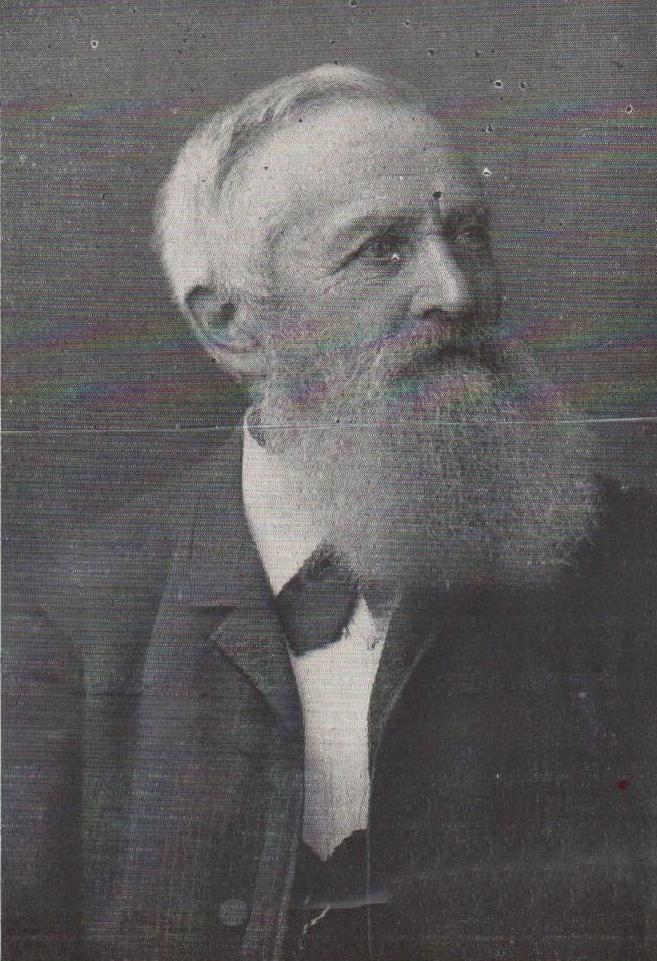

Ernst Ludwig Taschenberg (10 January 1818 Naumburg – 19 January 1898 Halle) was a German entomologist and teacher. He wrote several popular books on entomology with his own illustrations. His son Otto Taschenberg (1854-1922) also became an entomologist.

== Life ==
Taschenberg was born in Naumburg an der Saale, the son of a private tutor who ran classes for the daughters of upper-class families. He studied at Pforta and after 1836 Taschenberg studied mathematics and natural sciences in Leipzig and Berlin. He went, then, as an auxiliary teacher to the Franckesche Stiftungen in Halle and dedicated himself to arranging the important beetle collection of professor Germar and with the curation and study of the insect collection of the zoological museum particularly the entomology collections under Hermann Burmeister.

He worked as a teacher in the Jacobson School, Seesen for two years and then in five Zahna for five years but in 1856 he became “Inspektor“ at the zoological museum in Halle and in 1871 he was appointed extraordinary professor. His insect studies were mainly applied to agriculture, horticulture and silviculture and he is an important figure in the history of Economic entomology. He also described new insect species in several orders. His son Ernst Otto Wilhelm Taschenberg was also an entomologist specialising in Hymenoptera and Mallophaga.

== Works ==
- Was da kriecht und fliegt, Bilder aus dem Insektenleben. (Berlin 1861);
- Naturgeschichte der wirbellosen Tiere, die in Deutschland den Feld-, Wiesen- und Weidekulturpflanzen schädlich werden. (Leipzig 1865);
- Die Hymenopteren Deutschlands (Leipzig 1866);
- Entomologie für Gärtner und Gartenfreunde. (Leipzig 1871);
- Schutz der Obstbäume und deren Früchte gegen feindliche Tiere. (2. Aufl., Stuttgart 1879);
- Forstwirtschaftliche Insektenkunde. (Leipzig 1873);
- Das Ungeziefer der landwirtschaftlichen Kulturgewächse. ( Leipzig 1873);
- Praktische Insektenkunde. 5 Bde. (Bremen 1879-80);
- Die Insekten nach ihrem Schaden und Nutzen. (Leipzig 1882); Digital edition by the University and State Library Düsseldorf
- Die Insekten, Tausendfüker und Spinnen. (Leipzig und Wien 1892).

He also worked on the insects for Alfred Brehm's Tierleben (2. Aufl. 1877) and on zoological and entomological posters for school use.

== Collection ==
Taschenberg's faunistic collection of Hymenoptera and Lepidoptera from Sachsen-Anhalt is in the Martin Luther University of Halle-Wittenberg.
