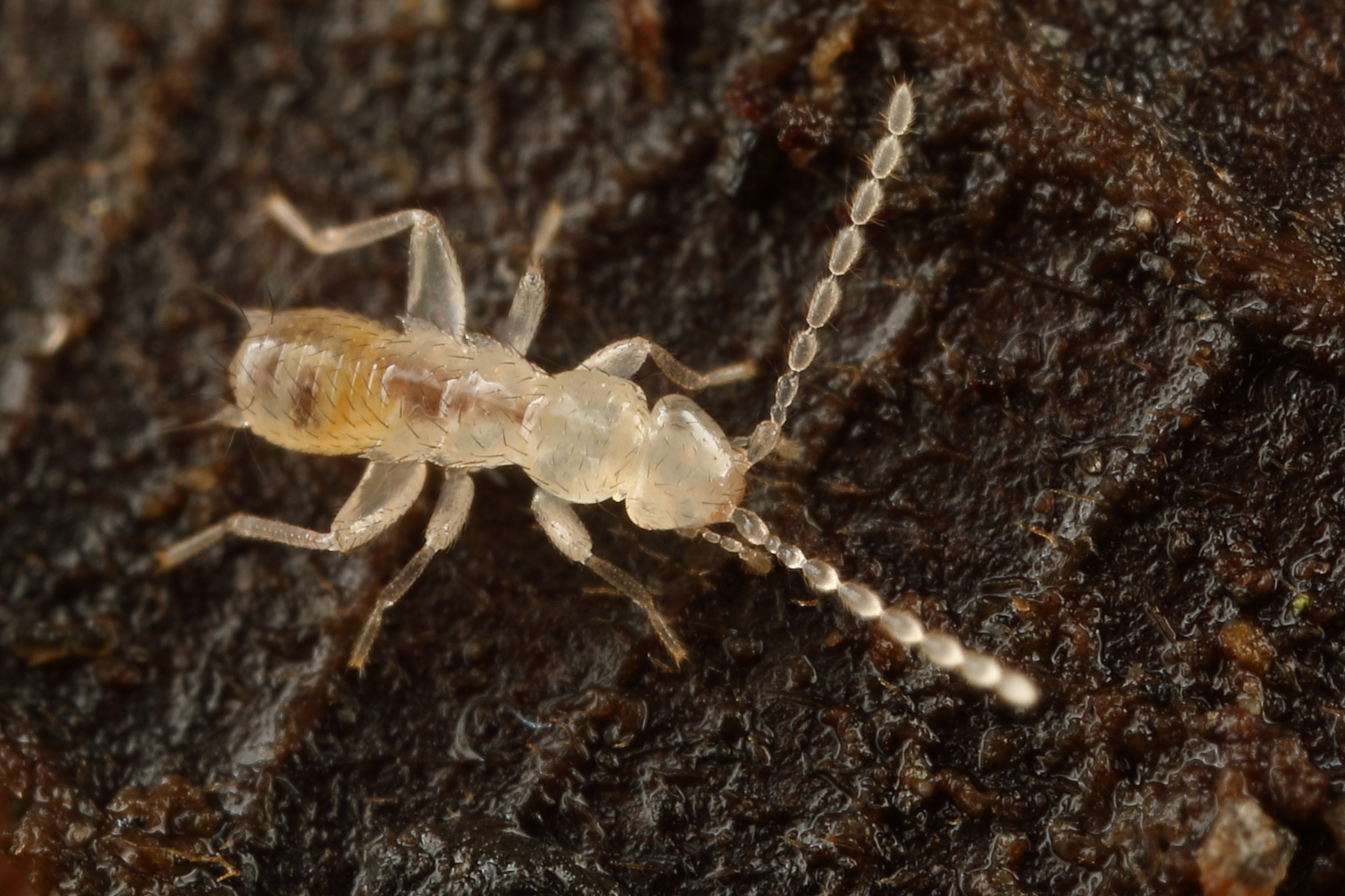
- Zorapteran observed in Los Bancos, Pichincha, Ecuador

Scientific classification
- Kingdom: Animalia
- Phylum: Arthropoda
- Clade: Pancrustacea
- Class: Insecta
- Subclass: Pterygota
- Infraclass: Neoptera
- Cohort: Polyneoptera
- Order: Zoraptera; Silvestri, 1913

Families
- Zorotypidae; Spiralizoridae

Diversity
- 51 species

= Zoraptera =

Zoraptera Temporal range: Cretaceous–Present

Order of insects

Zoraptera is an order of insects, sometimes called angel insects or ground lice. They are small and soft bodied insects with two forms: winged with wings sheddable as in termites, dark and with eyes (compound) and ocelli (simple); or wingless, pale and without eyes or ocelli. They have a characteristic nine-segmented beaded (moniliform) antenna. Their mouthparts are adapted for chewing and are mostly found under bark, in dry wood or in leaf litter, where they largely feed on fungus and detritus. The order is found on most continents, but are absent in places like Canada, New Zealand, Australia and Europe.

== Description ==
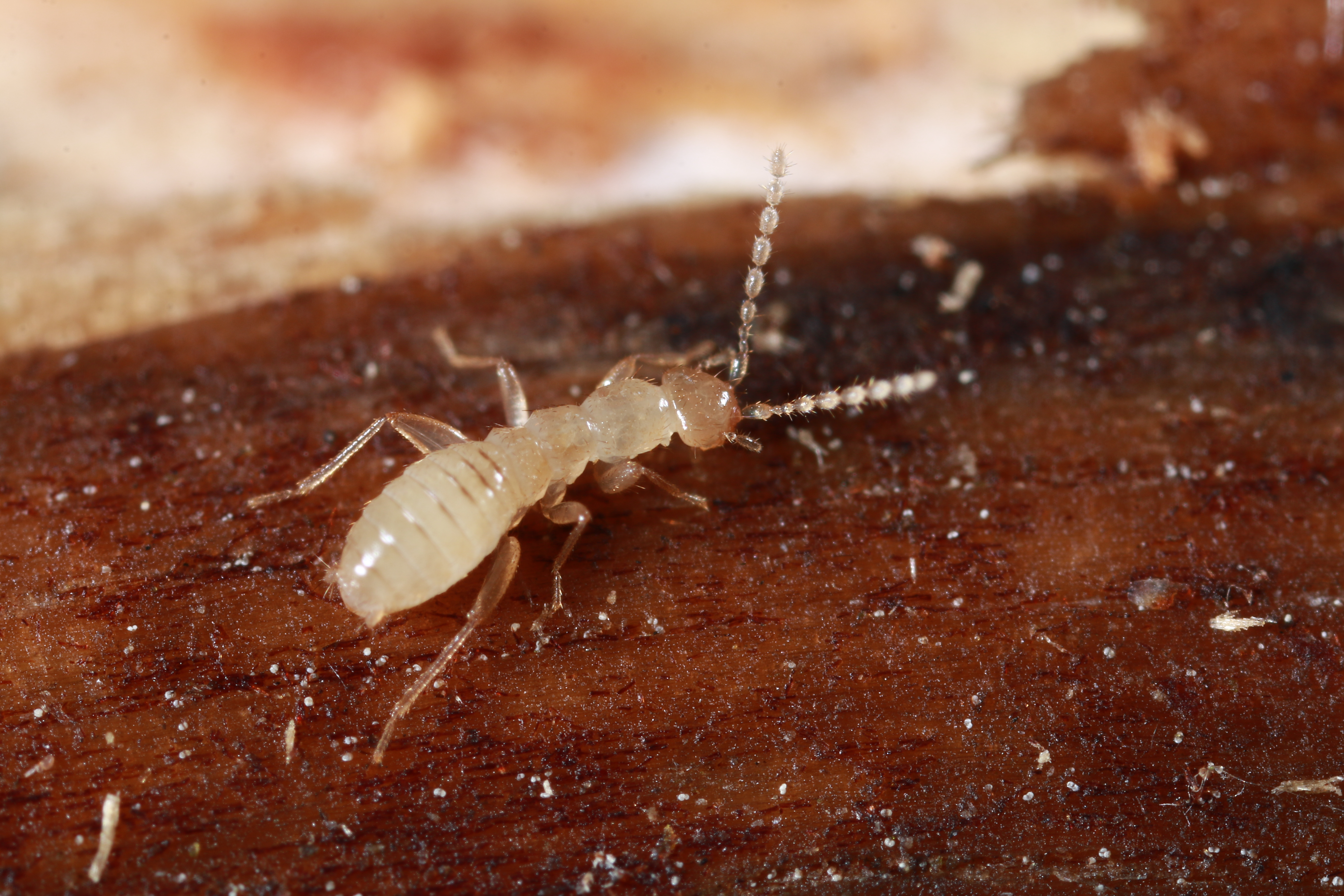
Photo of an indeterminate zorapteran

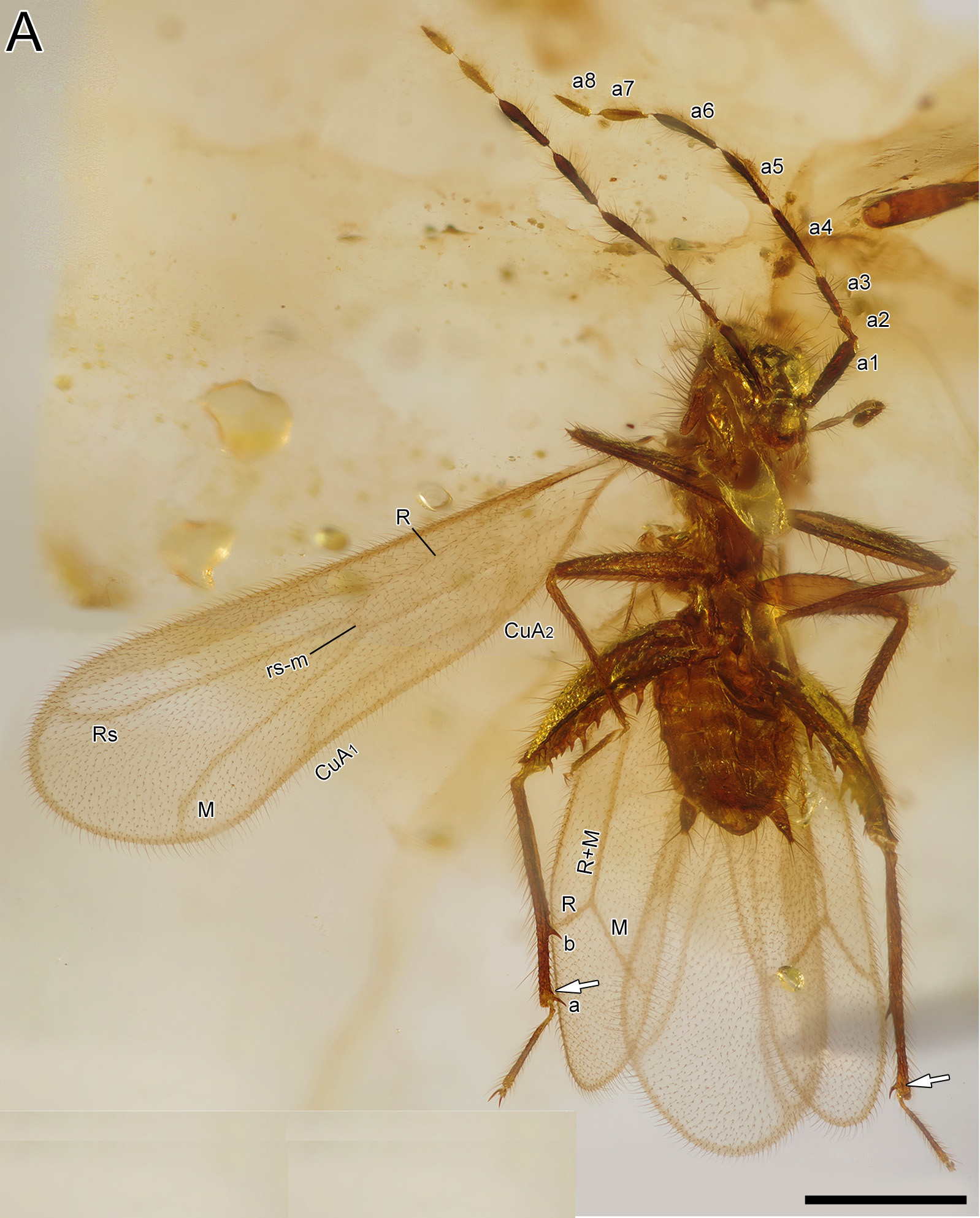
Winged fossil of Octozoros robustus (Spiralozoridae, Latinozorinae) from the mid-Cretaceous Burmese amber, around 99 million years old

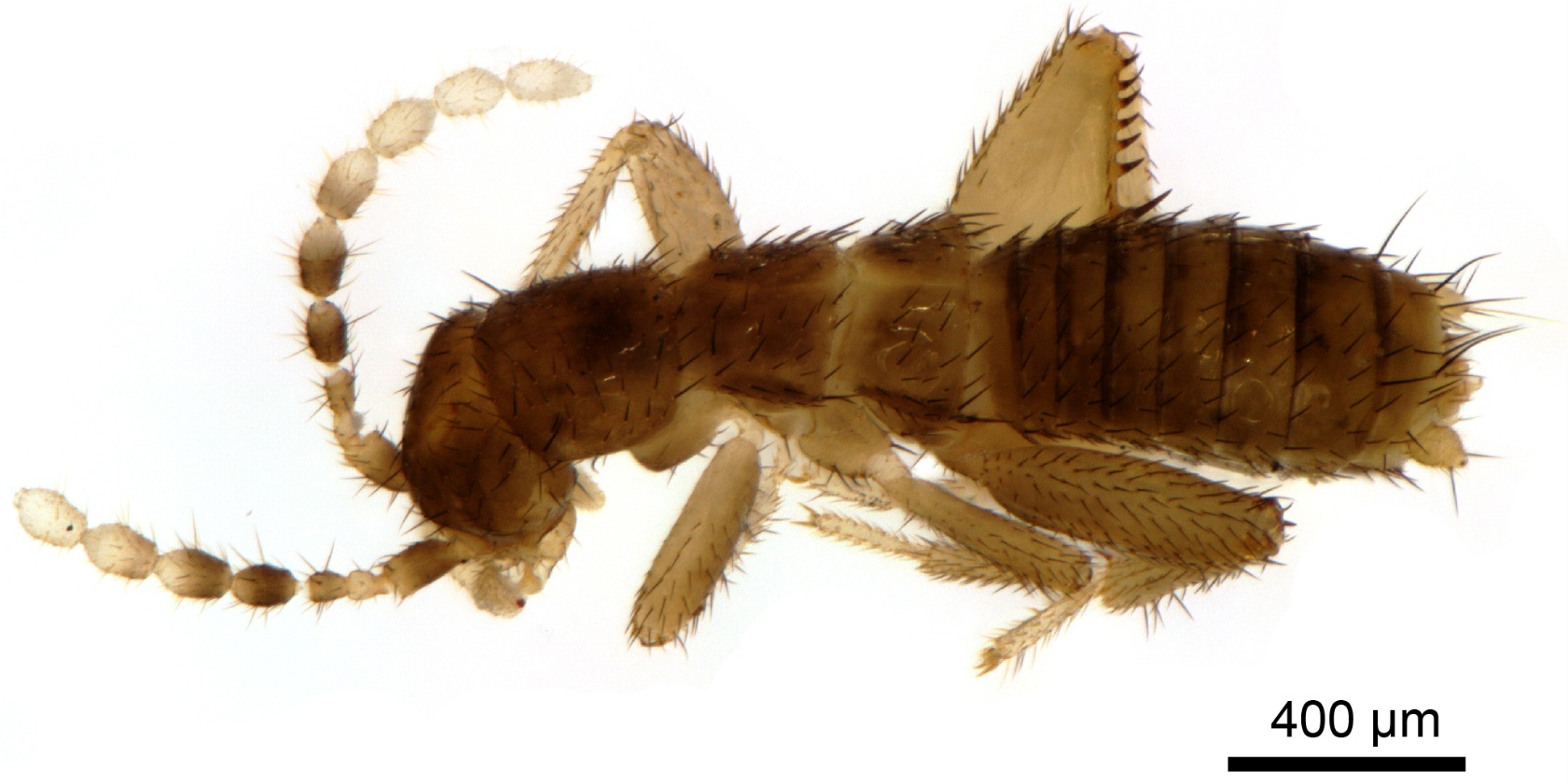
Specimen of Latinozoros (Spiralizoridae, Latinozorinae)

Top-down drawing of a wingless zorapteran

Top-down drawing of a winged (alate) zorapteran

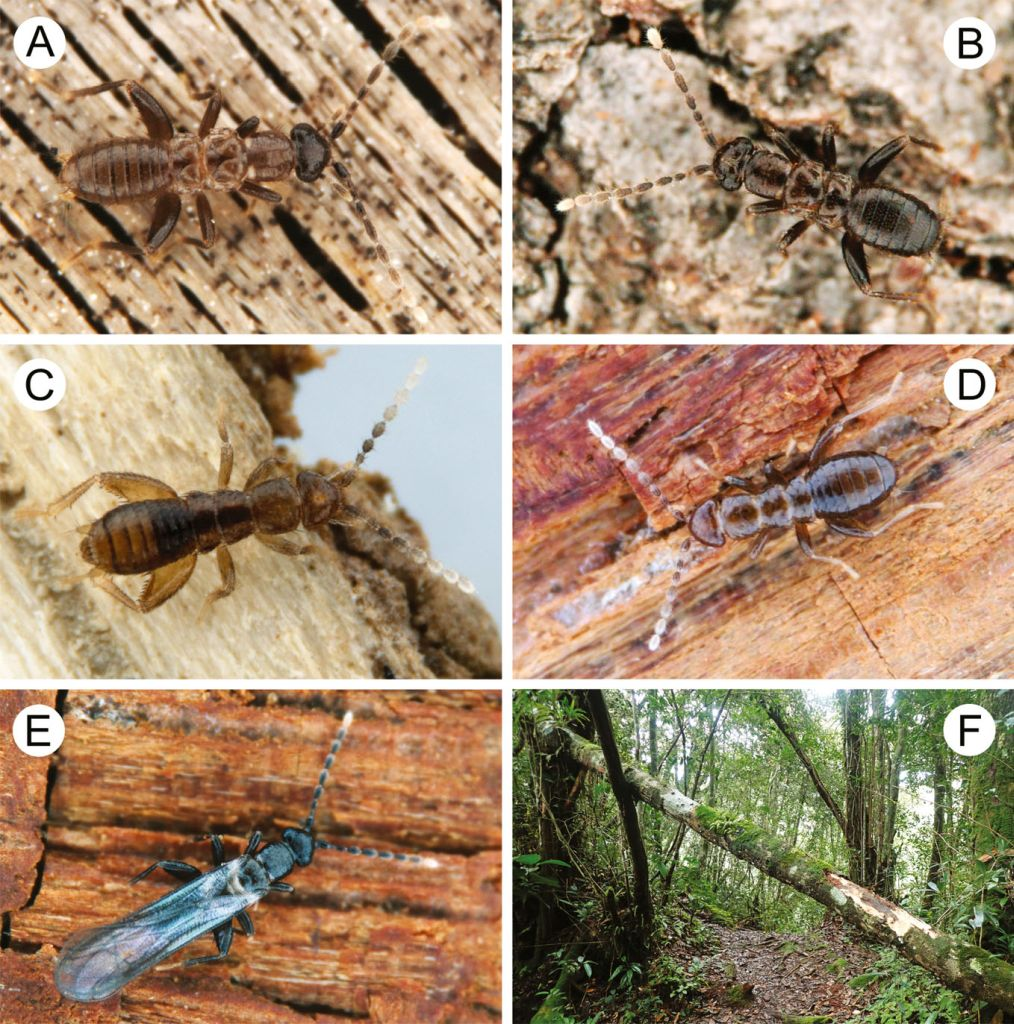
Various zorapterans A: Zorotypus sp. from Madagascar B: Spermozoros impolitus from Malaysia. C: Latinozoros sp. from Panama, D: Spiralizoros sp. from Malaysia E. winged/alate Brazilozoros cf. huxleyi from French Guiana. F: Zoraptera habitat in Malaysia

The name Zoraptera, given by Filippo Silvestri in 1913, is misnamed and potentially misleading: "zor" is Greek for pure and "aptera" means wingless. "Pure wingless" clearly does not fit the winged alate forms, which were discovered several years after the wingless forms had been described.

The members of this order are small insects, 3 millimetres (0.12 in) or less in length, that resemble termites in appearance and in their gregarious behavior. They are short and swollen in appearance. They belong to the hemimetabolous insects. They possess mandibulated biting mouthparts, short cerci (usually 1 segment only), and short antennae with 9 segments. The abdomen is segmented in 11 sections. The maxillary palps have five segments, labial palps three, in both the most distal segment is enlarged. They have six Malpighian tubules, and their abdominal ganglia have fused into two separate ganglionic complexes. Immature nymphs resemble small adults. Each species shows polymorphism. Most individuals are the apterous form or "morph", with no wings, no eyes, and no or little pigmentation. A few females and even fewer males are in the alate form with relatively large membranous wings that can be shed at a basal fracture line. Alates also have compound eyes and ocelli, and more pigmentation. This polymorphism can be observed already as two forms of nymphs. Wingspan can be up to 7 millimetres (0.28 in), and the wings can be shed spontaneously. When observed, wings are paddle shaped and have simple venation.

== Behavior and ecology ==
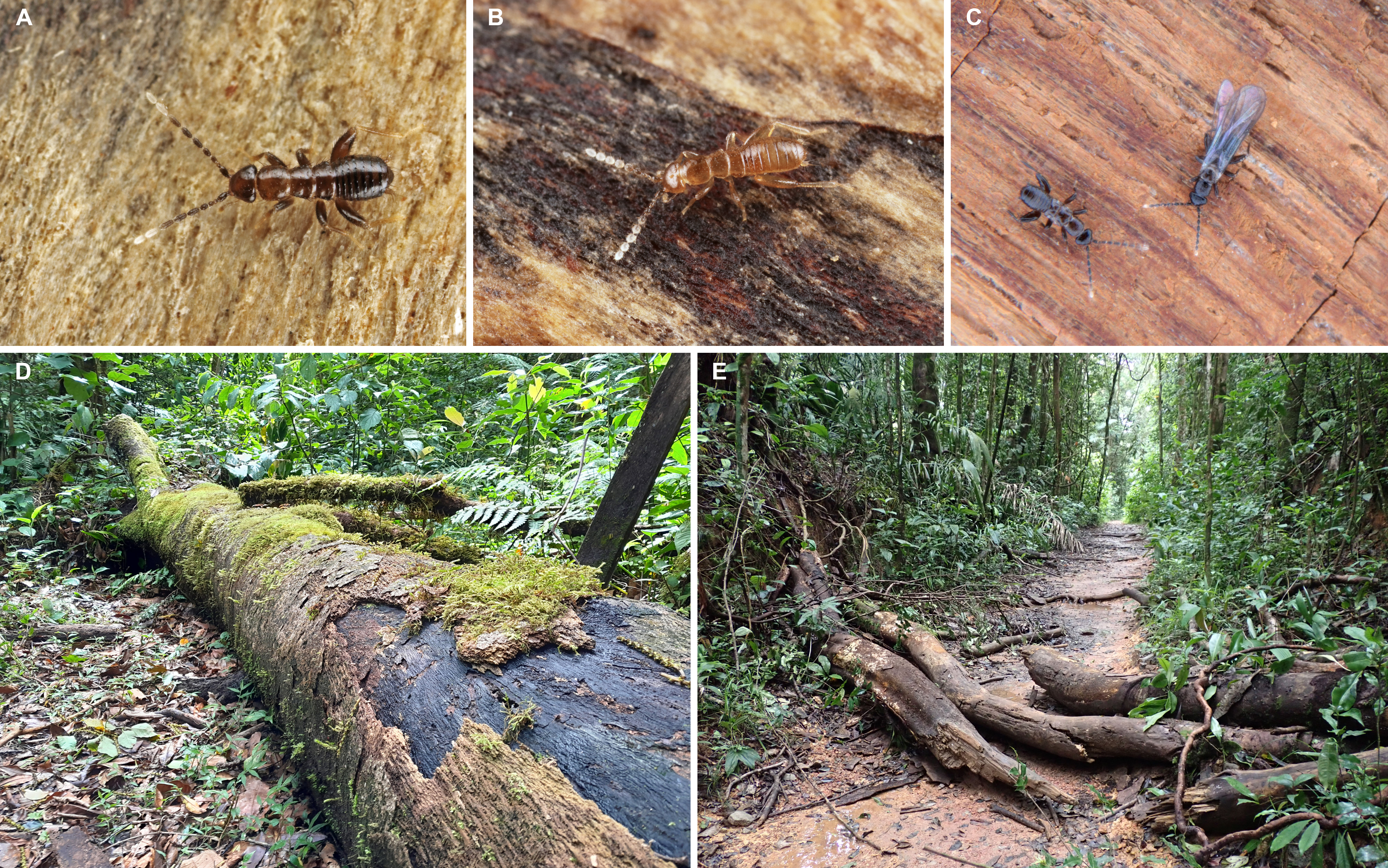
(A) Centrozoros gurneyi (wingless/apterous female), Panama. (B) Latinozoros cacaoensis (wingless male), French Guiana. (C) Brazilozoros cf. huxleyi (alate/winged and dealate females), French Guiana. (D) and (E), rotting logs observed being inhabited by zorapterans in Panama and French Guiana

Zorapterans live in small colonies beneath rotting wood, as well as under stones, they are detritivores, lacking in mouthparts able to tunnel into wood, but feeding on fungus, including spores and hyphae, as well as detritus. These insects can also hunt smaller arthropods like mites and springtails. Much of their time is spent grooming themselves or others. Under good conditions the blind and wingless (apterous) form predominates, but if their surroundings become too tough, they produce offspring which develop into winged (alate) adults with eyes. These winged offspring are then able to disperse and establish new colonies in areas with more resources. Once established, future generations are once again born blind and wingless.

Centrozoros gurneyi lives in colonies which range in size from a few dozen to several hundred individuals, but most often number about 30 individuals. The males are slightly larger than the females, and they fight for dominance.

When two colonies of Usazoros hubbardi are brought together experimentally, there is no difference in behavior towards members of the new colony. Therefore, colonies in the wild might merge easily. Winged forms are rare. The males in most colonies establish a linear dominance hierarchy in which age or duration of colony membership is the prime factor determining dominance. Males appearing later in colonies are at the bottom of the hierarchy, regardless of their body size. By continually attacking other males, the dominant male monopolizes a harem of females. The members of this harem stay clumped together. There is a high correlation between rank and reproductive success of the males.

Latinozoros barberi lack such a dominance structure but display complex courtship behavior including nuptial feeding. The males possess a cephalic gland that opens in the middle of their head. During courtship they secrete a fluid from this gland and offer it to the female. Acceptance of this droplet by the female acts as behavioral releaser and immediately leads to copulation.

In Spermozoros impolitus, copulation does not occur, but fertilization is accomplished instead by transfer of a spermatophore from the male to the female. This 0.1-millimetre (0.0039 in) spermatophore contains a single giant sperm cell, which unravels to about the same length as the female herself, 3 millimetres (0.12 in). It is thought that this large sperm cell prevents fertilization by other males, by physically blocking the female's genital tract.

=== Effects on ecosystem ===
Zorapterans are thought to provide some important services to ecosystems. By consuming detritus, such as dead arthropods, they assist in decomposition and nutrient cycling.

== Systematics ==
=== Evolution ===
The oldest fossils of zorapterans are known from amber fossils from the Cretaceous period, the oldest around 130-125 million years ago, with fossils known from both Jordanian and Burmese amber. These belong to modern zorapteran subfamilies, suggesting that the major diversification of the group occurred substantially earlier, beginning perhaps as early as the late Paleozoic, with the group likely originating in the tropical latitudes of Pangaea, with the fragmentation of Pangaea and zorapterans likely preference for tropical rainforests across their evolutionary history suggested to explain the disjunct distribution of modern zorapteran subfamilies. The fossil record indicaties that the modern zorapteran subfamilies formerly had a broader distribution in the past, but became regionally extinct in some areas (for example, Burmese amber indicates that Zorotypinae (Zorotypidae) and Latinozorinae (Spiralozoridae) were formerly present in the region during the Cretaceous, but are not present in Southeast Asia today).

=== Relationship to other insects ===
The phylogenetic relationship of the order beyond its placement in Polyneoptera remains controversial and elusive. It is generally supposed to be one of the most basal (earliest diverging) polyneopteran groups, alongside Plecoptera (stoneflies) and Dermaptera (earwings), with a number of studies supporting Zoraptera as most closely related to Dermaptera, though this was contested by a 2026 study that found the group as the earliest diverging lineage of the Polyneoptera.

The following cladogram, based on the molecular phylogeny of Wipfler et al. 2019, places Zoraptera as the sister group of Dermaptera. Zoraptera and Dermaptera together form the sister group of the remaining Polyneoptera:

- Polyneoptera
  - - Zoraptera (angel insects)
    - Dermaptera (earwigs)
  - - Plecoptera (stoneflies)
    - - Orthoptera (grasshoppers, crickets, katydids)
      - - Mecynoptera
          - Notoptera/Xenonomia
            - Grylloblattodea (ice crawlers)
            - Mantophasmatodea (gladiators)
          - Eukinolabia
            - Phasmatodea (stick insects)
            - Embioptera (webspinners)
        - Dictyoptera
          - Mantodea (mantises)
          - Blattodea (cockroaches and termites)

Phylogeny after Wang et al. 2026, which found Zoraptera alone at the base of Polyneoptera:

- Polyneoptera
  - Zoraptera (angel insects)
  - - Dermoplectopterida
      - Dermaptera (earwigs)
      - Plecoptera (stoneflies)
    - - Orthoptera (grasshoppers, crickets, katydids)
      - - Dictyoptera
          - Mantodea (mantises)
          - Blattodea (cockroaches and termites)
        - Mecynoptera
          - Notoptera/Xenonomia
            - Grylloblattodea (ice crawlers)
            - Mantophasmatodea (gladiators)
          - Eukinolabia
            - Phasmatodea (stick insects)
            - Embioptera (webspinners)

=== Internal classification ===
Historically, due to their extremely similar physical appearances between different species, almost all zorapterans were classified into the genus Zorotypus and family Zorotypidae. A 2020 molecular study erected a number of new genera, subfamilies, as well as the new family Spriralizoridae. The Zoraptera are currently divided into two families, four subfamilies, nine genera and a total of 51 species, some of which have not been yet described. There are eleven extinct species known as of 2017, many of the fossil species are known from Burmese amber.

- Family Zorotypidae Silvestri, 1913
  - Subfamily Zorotypinae Silvestri, 1913
    - Zorotypus Silvestri, 1913 — 7 spp. (Africa and South America)
    - Usazoros Kukalova-Peck & Peck, 1993 — 1 sp. (North America)
    - †Xenozorotypus Engel & Grimaldi, 2002 — 1 sp. Burmese amber, Myanmar, mid-Cretaceous (Cenomanian)
    - †Burmazoros Kočárek, Kočárková & Kundrata 2026 — 1 sp. Burmese amber, Myanmar, mid-Cretaceous (Cenomanian)
  - Subfamily Spermozorinae Kočárek, Horká & Kundrata, 2020
    - Spermozoros Kočárel, Horká & Kundrata, 2020 — 6 spp. (East and Southeast Asia)
- Family Spiralizoridae Kočárek, Horká & Kundrata, 2020
  - Subfamily Latinozorinae Kočárek, Horká & Kundrata, 2020
    - Latinozoros Kukalova-Peck & Peck, 1993 — 3 spp. (Central and South America)
    - †Octozoros Engel, 2003 — 4 spp. Burmese amber, Myanmar, mid-Cretaceous (Cenomanian)
    - †Cretozoros Kočárek, Kočárková & Kundrata 2026 — 2 spp. Burmese amber, Myanmar, mid-Cretaceous (Cenomanian)
    - †Paleospinosus Kaddumi, 2005 — 1 sp. Jordanian amber, mid-Cretaceous (Albian)
  - Subfamily Spiralizorinae Kočárek, Horká & Kundrata, 2020
    - Spiralizoros Kočárek, Horká & Kundrata, 2020 — 12 spp. (South and Southeast Asia, Oceania: Samoa)
    - Centrozoros Kukalova-Peck & Peck, 1993 (=Meridozoros Kukalova-Peck & Peck, 1993; Floridazoros Kukalova-Peck & Peck, 1993) — 8 spp. (Central and South America, Florida)
    - Cordezoros Kočárek, Horká & Kundrata, 2020 — 1 sp. (Oceania: Fiji)
    - Scapulizoros Kočárek, Horká & Kundrata, 2020 — 1 sp. (Oceania: New Guinea)
    - Brazilozoros Kukalova-Peck & Peck, 1993 — 3 spp. (South America)

Cladogram after Kočárek, Kočárková & Kundrata 2026:

- Zoraptera
  - Zorotypidae
    - Zorotypinae
      - †Xenozorotypus (Burmese amber, Cretaceous)
      - - †Burmazoros (Burmese amber, Cretaceous)
        - - Zorotypus (Africa, South America)
          - Usazoros (North America)
    - Spermozorinae
      Spermozoros (Southeast Asia)
  - Spiralozoridae
    - Latinozorinae
      - Latinozoros (Central and South America)
      - - †Cretozoros (Burmese amber, Cretaceous)
        - - †Octozoros (Burmese amber, Cretaceous)
          - †Paleospinosus (Jordanian amber, Cretaceous)
    - Spiralozorinae
      - - Brazilozoros (South America)
        - Centrozoros (Central and South America)
      - - Spiralizoros (Southeast Asia and Oceania)
        - - Scapulizoros (Oceania)
          - Corderozoros (Oceania)

==== Incertae sedis ====
The following species are considered Zoraptera incertae sedis:

- Zorotypus congensis van Ryn Tournel, 1971 – Congo (Dem.Rep.)
- Zorotypus javanicus Silvestri, 1913 – Java
- Zorotypus juninensis Engel, 2000 (considered a synonym of Centrozoros hamiltoni) – Peru
- Zorotypus lawrencei New, 1995 – Christmas Island
- Zorotypus leleupi Weidner, 1976 – Galápagos Islands
- Zorotypus longicercatus Caudell, 1927 – Jamaica
- Zorotypus newi (Chao & Chen, 2000) (=Formosozoros newi, is in actuality an immature earwig) – Taiwan
- Zorotypus sechellensis Zompro, 2005 – Seychelles
- Zorotypus swezeyi Caudell, 1922 – Hawaii
- †Zorotypus absonus Engel, 2008 – Dominican amber, Dominican Republic (Miocene)
- †Zorotypus goeleti Engel & Grimaldi, 2002 – Dominican amber, Dominican Republic (Miocene)
- †Zorotypus mnemosyne Engel, 2008 – Dominican amber, Dominican Republic (Miocene)
- †Zorotypus palaeus Poinar, 1988 – Dominican amber, Dominican Republic (Miocene)
- †Zorotypus cretatus Engel & Grimaldi, 2002 – Burmese amber, Myanmar (Cretaceous)
- †Zorotypus dilaticeps Yin, Cai, Huang, & Engel, 2018 – Burmese amber, Myanmar (Cretaceous)

== General references ==
- Costa JT 2006 Psocopera and Zoraptera. In: Costa JT The other Insect Societies. The Belknap Press of Harvard University Press, Cambridge, MA and London, UK pp 193–211
- Grimaldi, David; Engel, Michael S. (16 May 2005). Evolution of the Insects. Cambridge University Press. ISBN 978-1-107-26877-7. OCLC 56057971.
- Hubbard, Michael D. (1990). "A Catalog of the Order Zoraptera (Insecta)". Insecta Mundi. 4 (1–4).
- Rafael, José Albertino; Engel, Michael S. (2006). "A new species of Zorotypus from central Amazonia, Brazil (Zoraptera: Zorotypidae)". American Museum Novitates (3528): 1–11. doi:10.1206/0003-0082(2006)3528[1:ANSOZF]2.0.CO;2. hdl:2246/5806. S2CID 67852583.
- Kaddumi, Hani F. (2005). "Amber of Jordan, the Oldest Prehistoric Insects in Fossilized Resin". Publications of the Eternal River. Amman.: Museum of Natural History: 168. OCLC 235969870.
