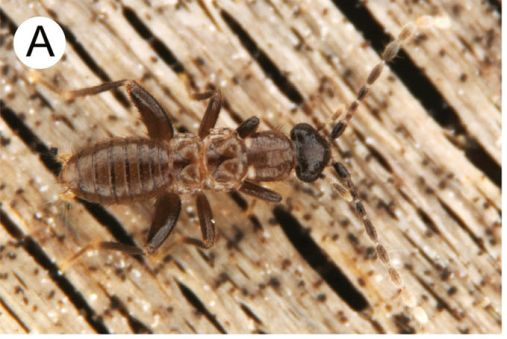
- Zorotypus sp. from Madagascar
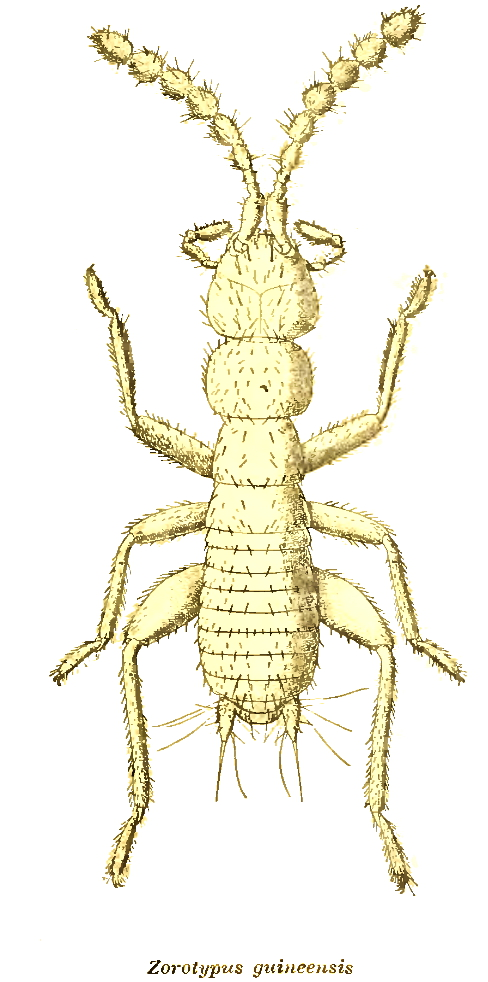
- Drawing of the type species Z. guineensis

Scientific classification
- Kingdom: Animalia
- Phylum: Arthropoda
- Clade: Pancrustacea
- Class: Insecta
- Order: Zoraptera
- Family: Zorotypidae
- Subfamily: Zorotypinae
- Genus: Zorotypus; Silvestri, 1913

Type species
- Zorotypus guineensis Silvestri, 1913

Synonyms
- Zoraptera Caudell, 1923 (misspelling)

= Zorotypus =

Genus of angel insects

Zorotypus is a genus of angel insects in the family Zorotypidae. It formerly contained all species in Zoraptera, but now only contains species found in Africa and South America.

== Species ==
The type species is Zorotypus guineensis from West Africa. Species of the genus sensu stricto are known from Tropical Africa, spanning from West Africa to Madagascar, as well as Brazil.

Genus Zorotypus Silvestri, 1913

Species Zorotypus amazonensis Rafael & Engel, 2006 – Brazil (Amazonas)
Species Zorotypus asymmetristernum Mashimo, 2018 – Kenya
Species Zorotypus caxiuana Rafael, Godoi & Engel, 2008 – Brazil (Pará)
Species Zorotypus delamarei Paulian, 1949 – Madagascar
Species Zorotypus guineensis Silvestri, 1913 – Ghana, Guinea, Ivory Coast
Species Zorotypus shannoni Gurney, 1938 – Brazil (Amazonas, Mato Grosso)
Species Zorotypus vinsoni Paulian, 1951 – Mauritius, Madagascar
Species Zorotypus komatsui Matsumura, Maruyama, Ntonifor & Beutel, 2023 – Cameroon

Unrevised extinct species
Species †Zorotypus absonus Engel, 2008 – Dominican amber, Dominican Republic (Miocene)
Species †Zorotypus goeleti Engel & Grimaldi, 2000 – Dominican amber, Dominican Republic (Miocene)
Species †Zorotypus mnemosyne Engel, 2008 – Dominican amber, Dominican Republic (Miocene)
Species †Zorotypus palaeus Poinar, 1988 – Dominican amber, Dominican Republic (Miocene)
