= Pachycondyla minuta =

Pachycondyla minuta can refer to:

- Pachycondyla minuta MacKay & MacKay, 2010, synonym of Rasopone minuta
- Pachycondyla minuta Dlussky & Wedmann, 2012, homonym replaced by Pachycondyla parvula
