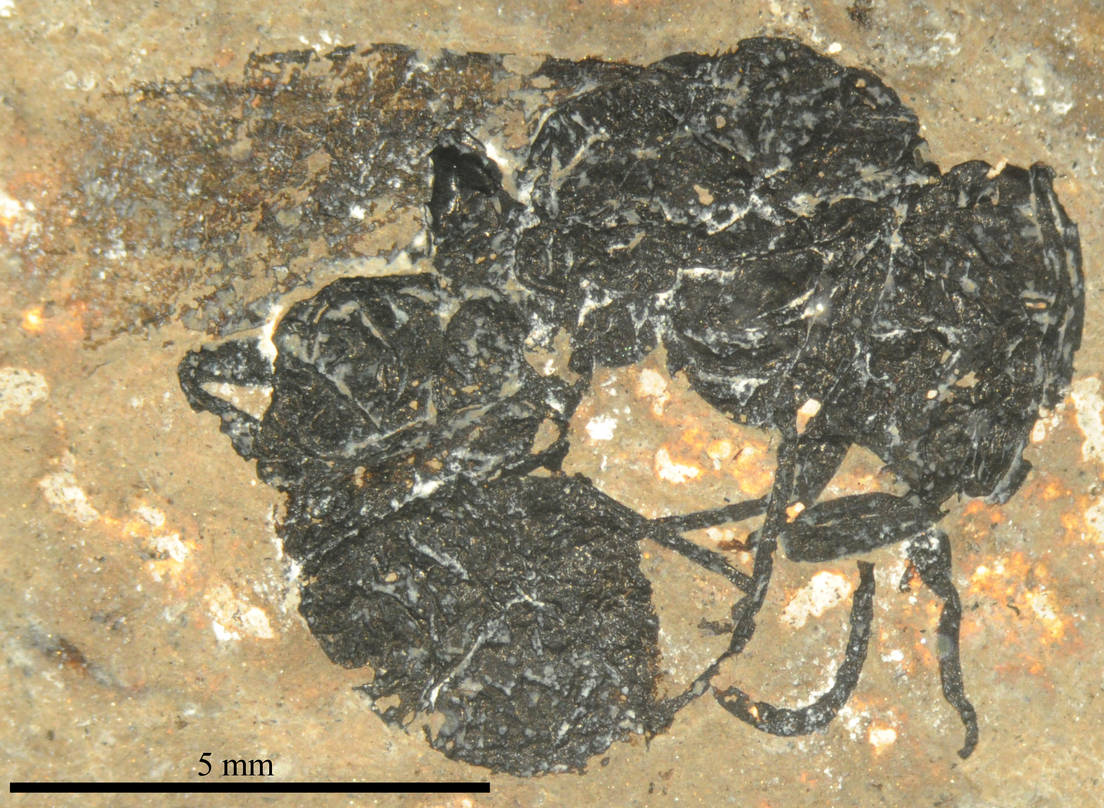
- P.? messeliana holotype

Scientific classification
- Kingdom: Animalia
- Phylum: Arthropoda
- Clade: Pancrustacea
- Class: Insecta
- Order: Hymenoptera
- Family: Formicidae
- Genus: Pachycondyla
- Species: †P. messeliana

Binomial name
- †Pachycondyla messeliana Dlussky & Wedmann, 2012

= Pachycondyla? messeliana =

Pachycondyla? messeliana Temporal range: Lutetian

Extinct species of ant

Pachycondyla? messeliana is an extinct species of ants in the formicid subfamily Ponerinae described from a fossil found in Europe. P.? messeliana is one of six Lutetian Pachycondyla species.

== History and classification ==
When described Pachycondyla? messeliana was known from a single fossil insect which is a compression-impression fossil preserved in a layer of soft sedimentary rock. Along with other well preserved insect fossils, the P.? messeliana specimen was collected from layers of the Lutetian Messel pit World Heritage Site. The formation is composed of brown coals, oil shales, and bituminous shale, which preserved numerous insects, fish, birds, reptiles, and terrestrial mammals as a notable lagerstätten. The area is a preserved maar lake which initially formed approximately 47 million years ago as the result of volcanic explosions.

At the time of description, the holotype specimen, number SMF MeI 4744, was preserved in the Senckenberg Research Station Messel fossil collections. The fossil was described by Gennady Dlussky and Sonja Wedmann in a 2012 paper on the poneromorph ants of Messel. The specific epithet "messeliana" was coined in recognition of the type locality for the species.

Due to the nature of the fossil, many of the important features used to distinguish the genus placement of an ant are obscured or not preserved at all. This leave the placement of the species as uncertain until better fossils are described. The helcium, a small plate in between the petiole and gaster, is visible low on the first gastral segment, which removes Amblyoponinae or Ectatomminae for possible placement of the species. Based on the size of the head capsule, the genus Cyrtopone is not an option, and the petiole structure is different from that seen in Protopone, Cephalopone or Messelepone, leaving the species as part of Pachycondyla or an undescribed genus. Since the condition of the fossil does not show enough other detail, it was placed into Pachycondyla by Dlussky & Wedmann.

The species is one of six Pachycondyla species which have been described from Messel Formation fossils. All six of the species were described by Dlussky and Wedmann in the same 2012 paper, the other five being P. eocenica, P. lutzi, P. parvula, P. petiolosa, and P. petrosa. Another eight fossil species have been described from fossils in North America, Europe, and Asia.

== Description ==
The Pachycondyla? messeliana queen has a body length of approximately 14.5 mm (0.57 in) and the massive head is 3.5 mm (0.14 in), while the alitrunk is 4.5 mm (0.18 in). The antennae scape extends towards the rear margin of the head but does not extend past it. The front section of the mesonotum, the scutum, has an outline that is convex, and the petiole scale is tapered upwards. Both front and back sides of the scale are slightly convex, while top is a rounded point.
