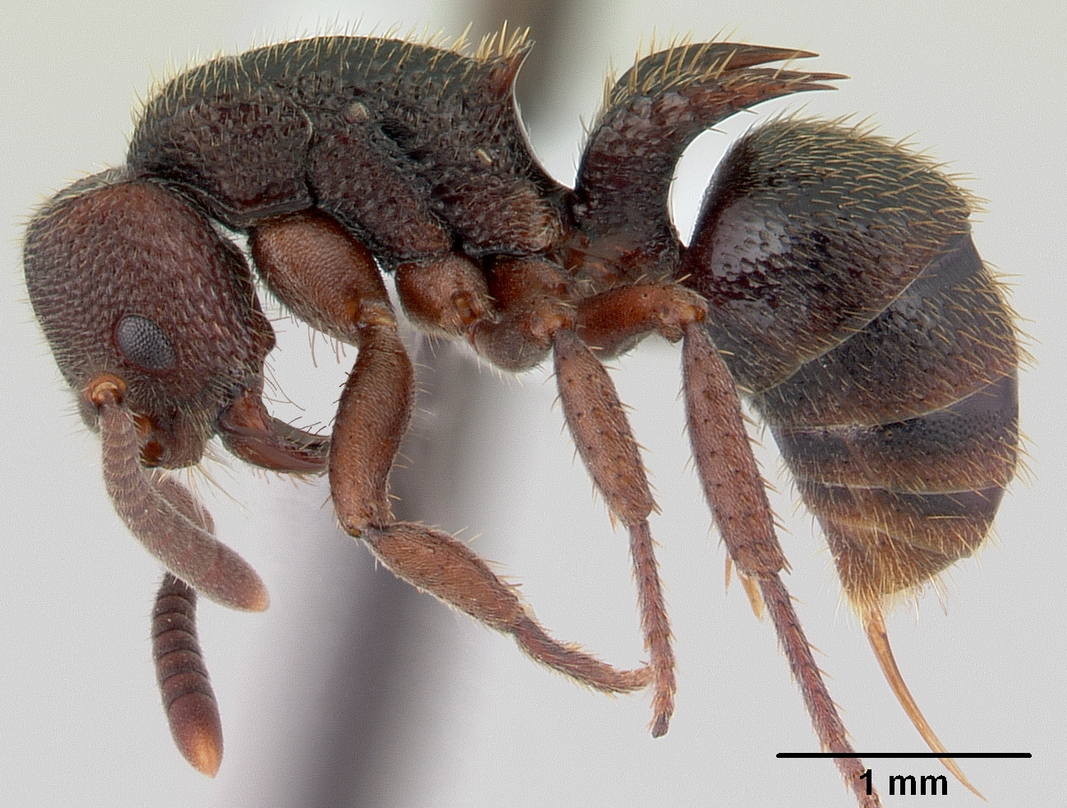
- Phrynoponera bequaerti worker

Scientific classification
- Domain: Eukaryota
- Kingdom: Animalia
- Phylum: Arthropoda
- Class: Insecta
- Order: Hymenoptera
- Family: Formicidae
- Genus: Phrynoponera
- Species: P. bequaerti

Binomial name
- Phrynoponera bequaerti Wheeler, 1922

= Phrynoponera bequaerti =

Species of ant

Phrynoponera bequaerti is an Afrotropical species of ant in the subfamily Ponerinae. The species is almost as common and widespread as Phrynoponera gabonensis and by far the smallest species in the genus. P. bequaerti is easily recognized by its size, lack of clypeal teeth and short, broad funicular segments. Unlike P. gabonensis and P. sveni, P. bequaerti has not been found in termitaries.
