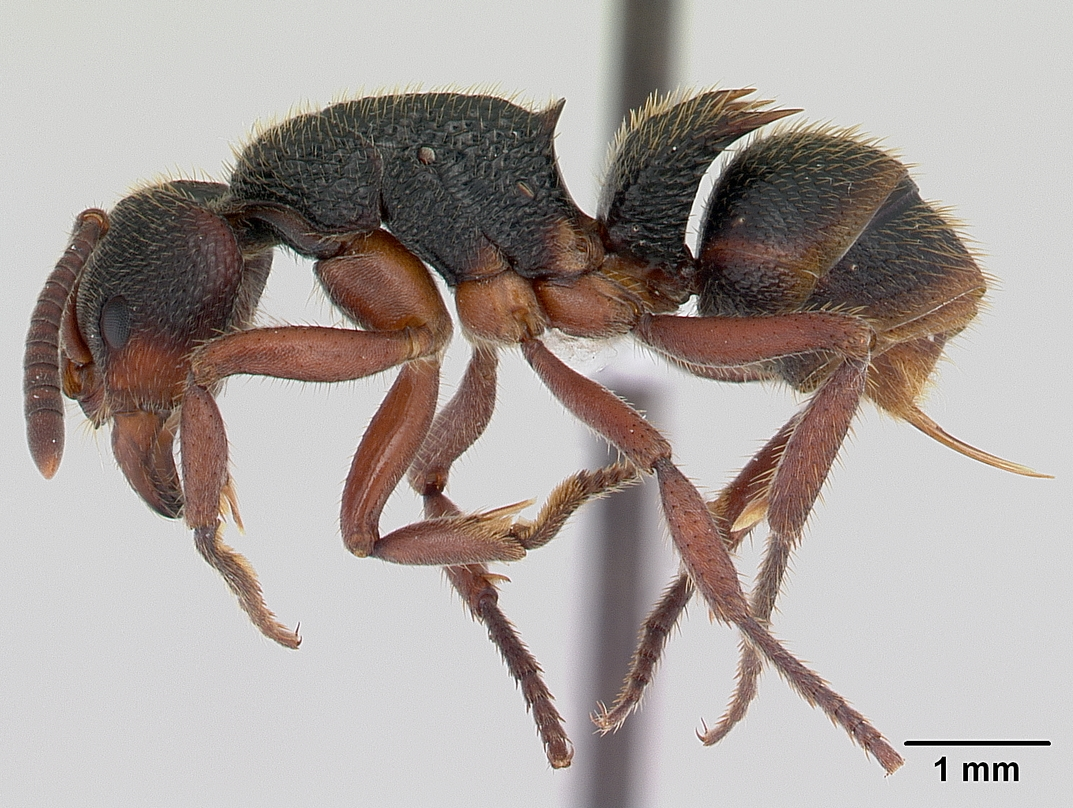
- Phrynoponera gabonensis worker from the Central African Republic

Scientific classification
- Kingdom: Animalia
- Phylum: Arthropoda
- Class: Insecta
- Order: Hymenoptera
- Family: Formicidae
- Subfamily: Ponerinae
- Tribe: Ponerini
- Genus: Phrynoponera; Wheeler, 1920

Type species
- Bothroponera gabonensi

Diversity
- 5 species

= Phrynoponera =

Genus of ants

Phrynoponera is a strictly Afrotropical genus of ants in the subfamily Ponerinae.

== Species ==
- Phrynoponera bequaerti Wheeler, 1922
- Phrynoponera gabonensis (André, 1892)
- Phrynoponera pulchella Bolton & Fisher, 2008
- Phrynoponera sveni (Forel, 1916)
- Phrynoponera transversa Bolton & Fisher, 2008

== Distribution ==
Five species are currently recognized in the genus, of which two, P. bequaerti and P. gabonensis, are widely distributed in the Afrotropical forest zone and are usually collected in leaf litter samples and pitfall traps. They nest in and under rotten wood, and sometimes directly in compacted soil. At least two species, P. gabonensis and P. sveni, will also nest in upright or fallen termitaries, but are by no means common in such places. Phrynoponera species are not generally considered to be termitophagous, but their actual diet remains unknown, so termites may form a part of it. Individuals are not particularly numerous in litter samples. Belshaw & Bolton (1994) recorded the two species that occur in Ghana (P. bequaerti, P. gabonensis) as comprising only 0.08% of individuals in the leaf litter ant fauna. Beyond these few facts, nothing is known of their biology.

== Taxonomy ==
The name Phrynoponera first appeared in a paper by Wheeler (1920), merely as a new genus-group name with the designation of an already described species as the type species. A couple of years later Wheeler (1922) presented a formal description of the genus, a synopsis of newly discovered material from the Democratic Republic of Congo, mostly infraspecific taxa, and notes on a few previously described forms. The description of the genus that Wheeler (1922) presented was adequate for its time, but superficial by modern standards and mistaken in several characters. First, Wheeler noted that the "stridulatory surface is well developed", which it is not. In fact, the stridulitrum is absent from all species except P. pulchella, where a vestigial and non-functional remnant is present. Second, he maintained that there was an "absence of any constriction between postpetiole [= first gastral segment] and gaster", when in fact differentiated presclerites are strongly developed on the second gastral segment but are specialized in form and usually concealed by the posterior portions of the sclerites of the first gastral segment. However, Wheeler did recognise that the apparent similarities between his Phrynoponera species and two Indian Pachycondyla (then Bothroponera) species, Pachycondyla bispinosa (bispinose propodeum) and Pachycondyla rufipes (denticulate dorsal margin of petiole), were superficial and possibly independently acquired. Each of these Phrynoponera-like species lack the extremely specialized morphology of the petiole sternite, helcium, and prora, as well as the characteristic 5-spinose petiole node, that are unique and consistent in the female castes of Phrynoponera.
