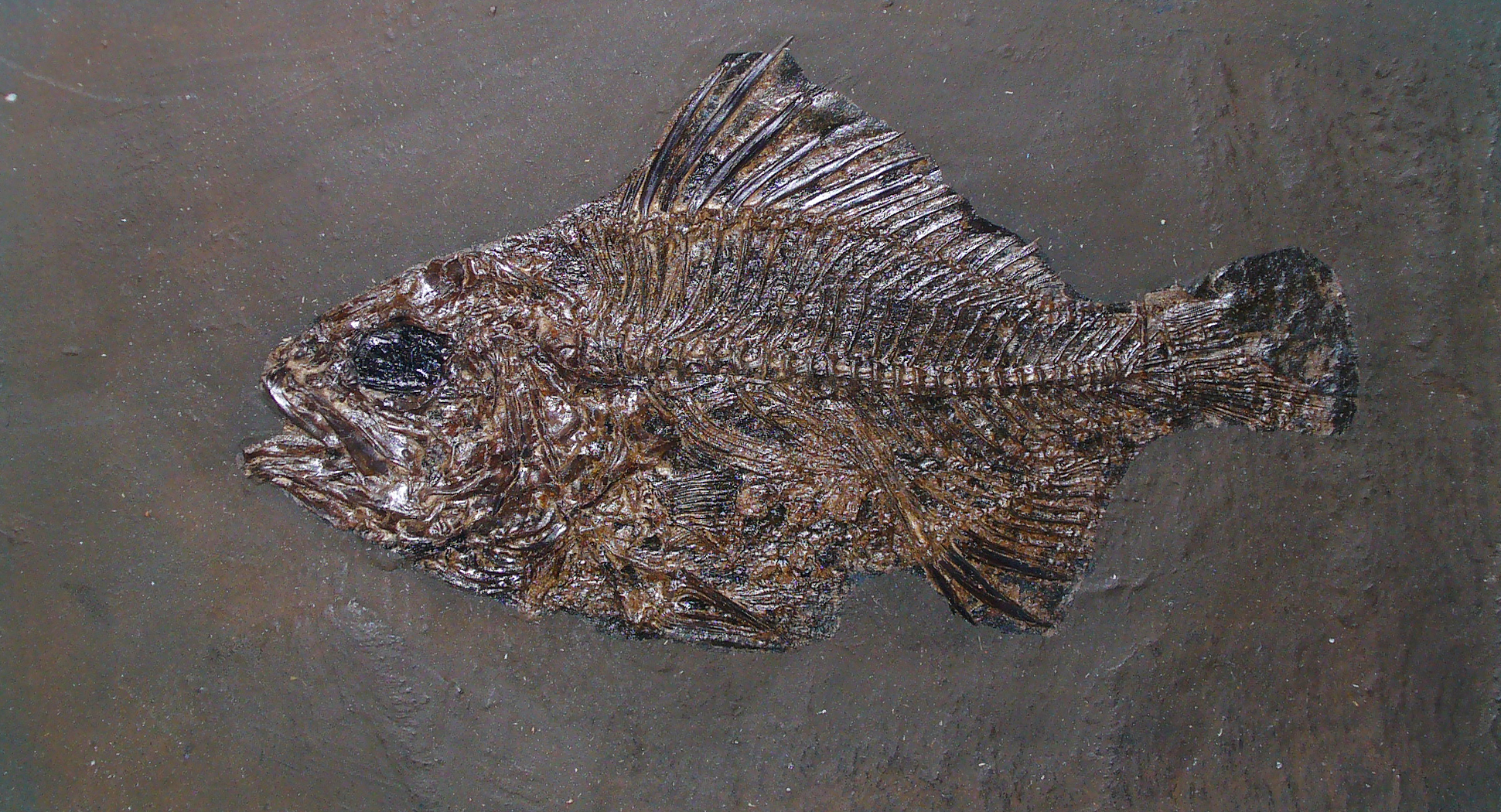
- Specimen at State Museum of Natural History Karlsruhe

Scientific classification
- Kingdom: Animalia
- Phylum: Chordata
- Class: Actinopterygii
- Clade: Percomorpha
- Genus: †Amphiperca; Weitzel, 1933
- Species: †A. multiformis

Binomial name
- †Amphiperca multiformis Weitzel, 1933

= Amphiperca =

Amphiperca Temporal range: Middle Eocene

Extinct genus of ray-finned fishes

Amphiperca is an extinct genus of freshwater percomorph ray-finned fish that lived from the early to middle Eocene of Europe. It has one known species, A. multiformis, known from the famous Messel Pit of Germany. Indeterminate remains are known from concurrent formations in Occitanie, France. It was a predatory fish that is known to have fed on Thaumaturus and Rhenanoperca.

Some authors have suggested serranid or percichthyid affinities for it.
