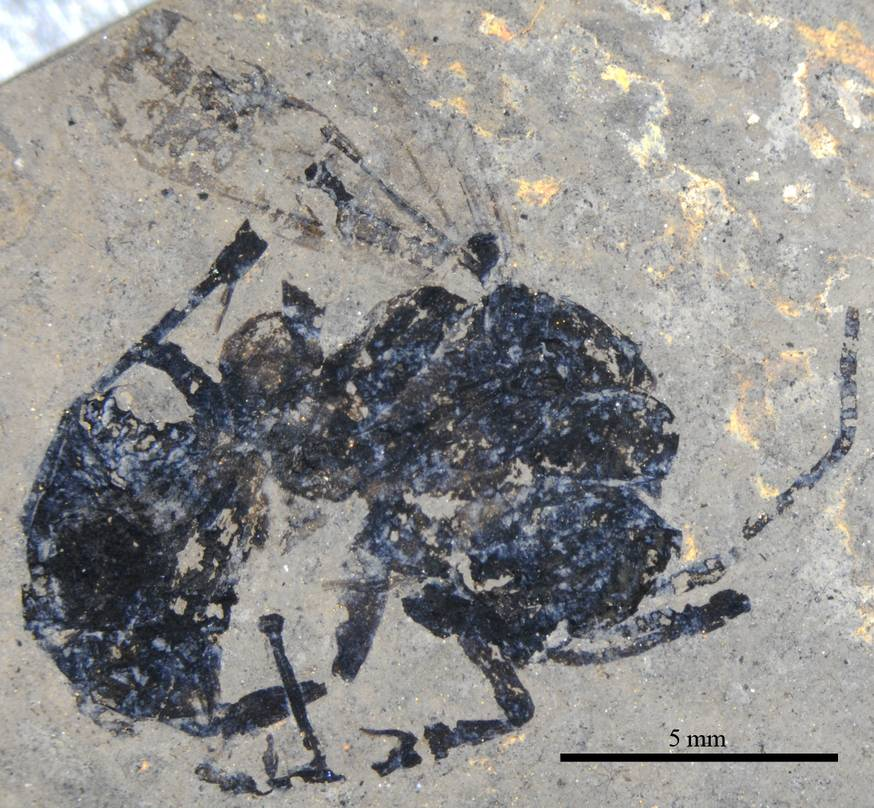
- P. petiolosa holotype

Scientific classification
- Kingdom: Animalia
- Phylum: Arthropoda
- Clade: Pancrustacea
- Class: Insecta
- Order: Hymenoptera
- Family: Formicidae
- Genus: Pachycondyla
- Species: †P. petiolosa

Binomial name
- †Pachycondyla petiolosa Dlussky & Wedmann, 2012

= Pachycondyla petiolosa =

Pachycondyla petiolosa Temporal range: Lutetian

Extinct species of ant

Pachycondyla petiolosa is an extinct species of ant in the formicid subfamily Ponerinae described from a fossil found in Europe. P. parvula is one of six Lutetian Pachycondyla species.

== History and classification ==
When described Pachycondyla petiolosa was known from two fossil insects which are compression-impression fossils preserved in layers of soft sedimentary rock. Along with other well preserved insect fossils, the P. petiolosa specimens were collected from layers of Lutetian Messel Formation rock in the Messel pit World Heritage Site. The Messel formation is composed of brown coals, oil shales, and bituminous shale, which preserved numerous insects, fish, birds, reptiles, and terrestrial mammals as a notable lagerstätten. The area is a preserved maar lake which initially formed approximately 47 million years ago as the result of volcanic explosions.

At the time of description, the holotype specimen, number SMF MeI 1893, along with the paratype SMF MeI 1427 were preserved in the Senckenberg Research Station Messel fossil collections. The fossils were described by Gennady Dlussky and Sonja Wedmann in a 2012 paper on the poneromorph ants of Messel. In the type description Dlussky and Wedmann named the species P. petiolosa, with the specific epithet derived from the Latin "petiolosus", chosen in recognition of notably visible petiole.

The species is one of six Pachycondyla which have been described from Messel Formation fossils. All six of the species were described by Dlussky and Wedmann in the same 2012 paper, the other five being P. eocenica, P. lutzi, P.? messeliana, P. parvula, and P. petrosa. Another eight fossil species have been described from fossils in North America, Europe, and Asia.

== Description ==
Both of the Pachycondyla petiolosa queens are preserved in lateral positioning and have body lengths of approximately 20–22 mm (0.79–0.87 in) and the head is 4.7 mm (0.19 in). The alitrunk is 7.1–7.2 mm (0.28–0.28 in) long, with the queens being described as being built massive and large. The antennae scape extends just beyond the occipital margin of the head, and the funicular segments in the middle are longer than wide. The eyes are oval in shape and placed slightly behind of the head's midpoint. Where preserved the mandibles comprise less than half the length of the head. The petiole is rounded in side view, with a high, thick scale, and there are visible hairs preserved on the last segment of the petiole.
