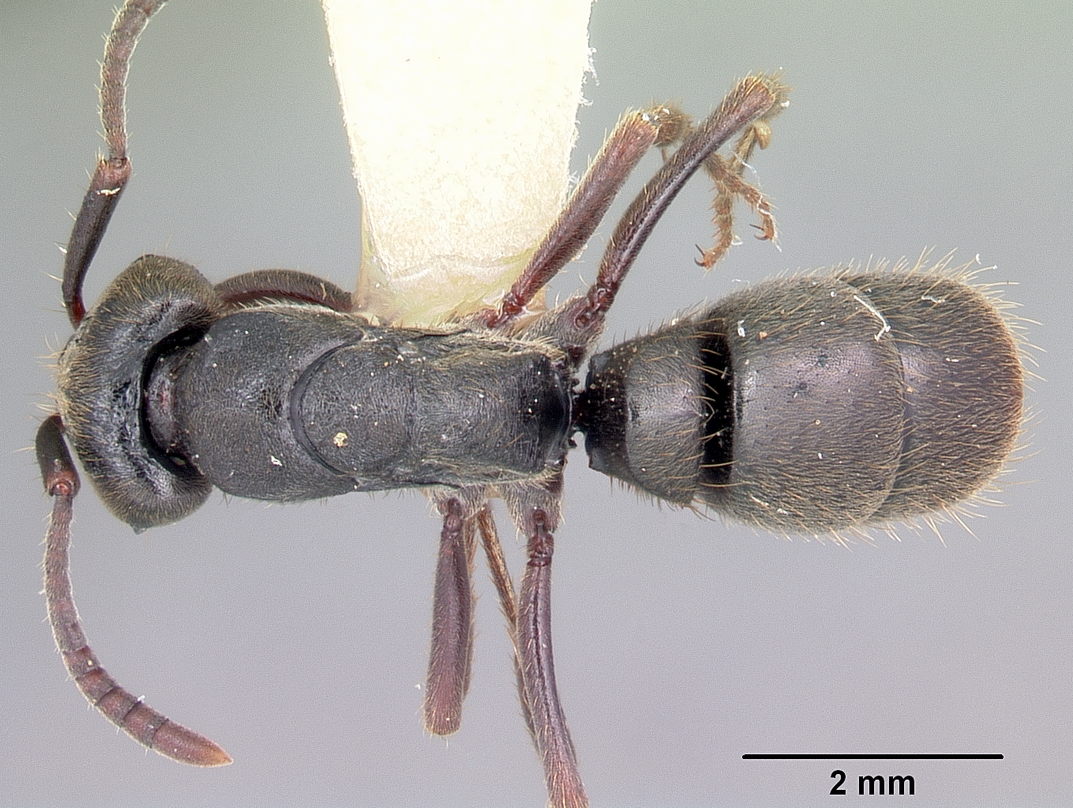

Scientific classification
- Domain: Eukaryota
- Kingdom: Animalia
- Phylum: Arthropoda
- Class: Insecta
- Order: Hymenoptera
- Family: Formicidae
- Genus: Pachycondyla
- Species: P. harpax

Binomial name
- Pachycondyla harpax (Fabricius, 1804)

= Pachycondyla harpax =

Species of ant

Pachycondyla harpax, the rapacious panther ant, is a species of ant in the family Formicidae.

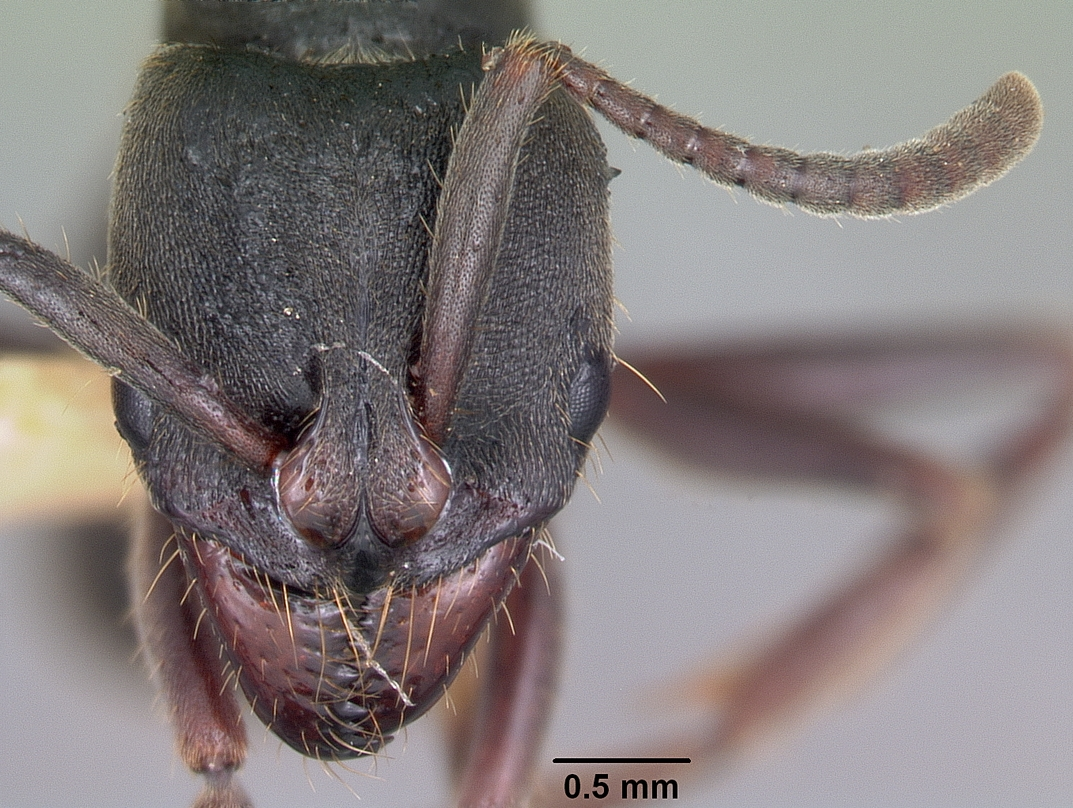
Rapacious panther ant, Pachycondyla harpax

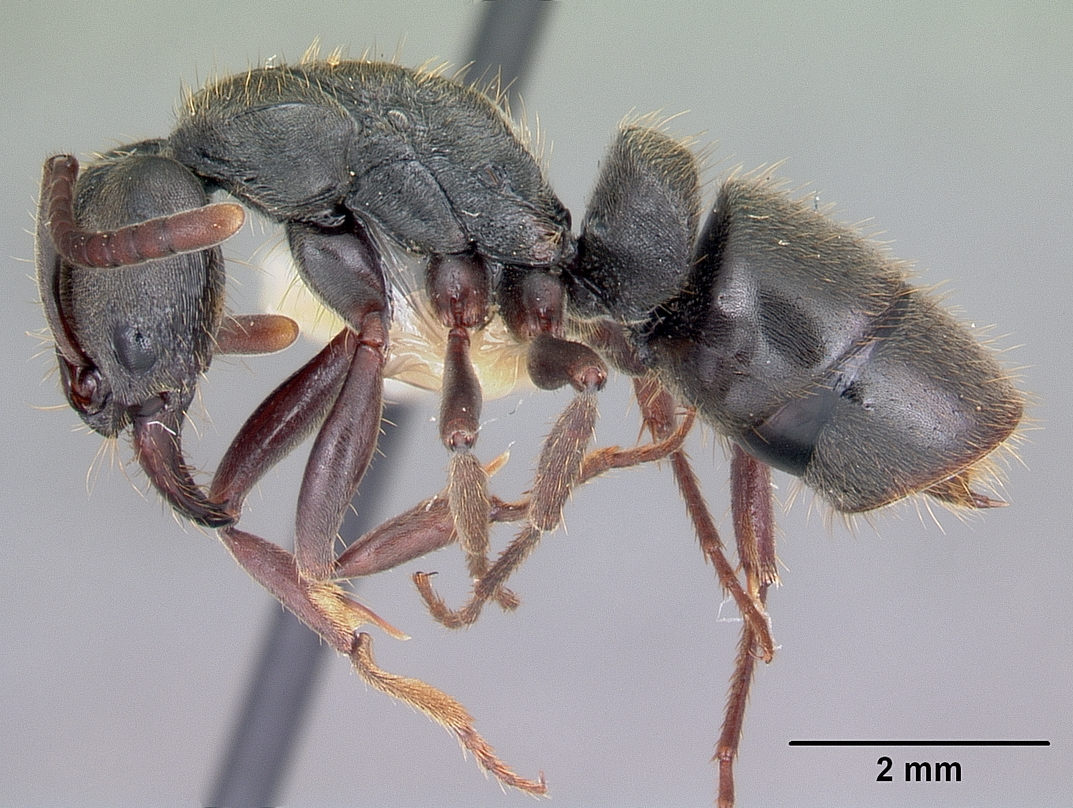
Rapacious panther ant, Pachycondyla harpax
