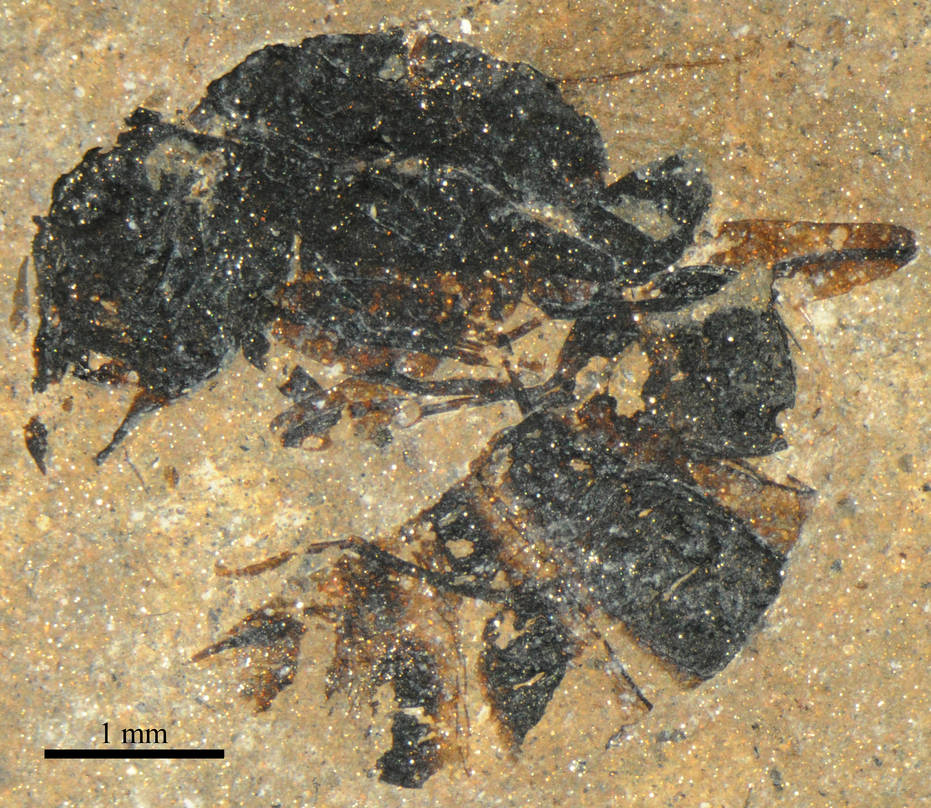
- P. eocenica holotype

Scientific classification
- Domain: Eukaryota
- Kingdom: Animalia
- Phylum: Arthropoda
- Class: Insecta
- Order: Hymenoptera
- Family: Formicidae
- Genus: Pachycondyla
- Species: †P. eocenica

Binomial name
- †Pachycondyla eocenica Dlussky & Wedmann, 2012

= Pachycondyla eocenica =

Pachycondyla eocenica Temporal range: Lutetian

Extinct species of ant

Pachycondyla eocenica is an extinct species of ant in the formicid subfamily Ponerinae described from fossils found in Europe. P. eocenica is one of six Lutetian Pachycondyla species.

== History and classification ==
When described, Pachycondyla eocenica was known from two fossil insects which are compression-impression fossils preserved in layers of soft sedimentary rock. Along with other well-preserved insect fossils, the P. eocenica specimens were collected from layers of the Lutetian Messel pit World Heritage Site. The formation is composed of brown coals, oil shales, and bituminous shale, which preserved numerous insects, fish, birds, reptiles, and terrestrial mammals as a notable lagerstätten. The area is a preserved maar lake which initially formed approximately 47 million years ago as the result of volcanic explosions.

At the time of description, the holotype specimen, number SMF MeI 10999, was preserved in the Senckenberg Research Station Messel fossil collections. The fossils were described by Gennady Dlussky and Sonja Wedmann in a 2012 paper on the poneromorph ants of Messel. The specific epithet "eocenica" is derived from the Eocene age of the fossil.

The species is one of six Pachycondyla species which have been described from Messel Formation fossils. All six of the species were described by Dlussky and Wedmann in the same 2012 paper, the other five being P. lutzi, P.? messeliana, P. parvula, P. petiolosa, and P. petrosa. Another eight fossil species have been described from fossils in North America, Europe, and Asia.

== Description ==
The Pachycondyla eocenica holotype specimen is a partially preserved adult queen, which was fossilized as a lateral impression, missing portions of the legs and wings. The paratype is a very partial dorsal impression, preserving only the head, either of a gyne or a worker. The overall length of the queen is approximately 8.8 mm (0.35 in) and the head has an estimated length of 1.5 mm (0.059 in). The antennae are slender in appearance, composed of a scape which extends nearly to the edge of the rear margin of the head. The eyes are rounded in outline and placed to the front of the midpoint on the head. The shape of the petiole scale is rounded on the top edge, as is that of both P. messeliana and P. succinea, but it is larger than P. succinea and smaller than P. messeliana.
