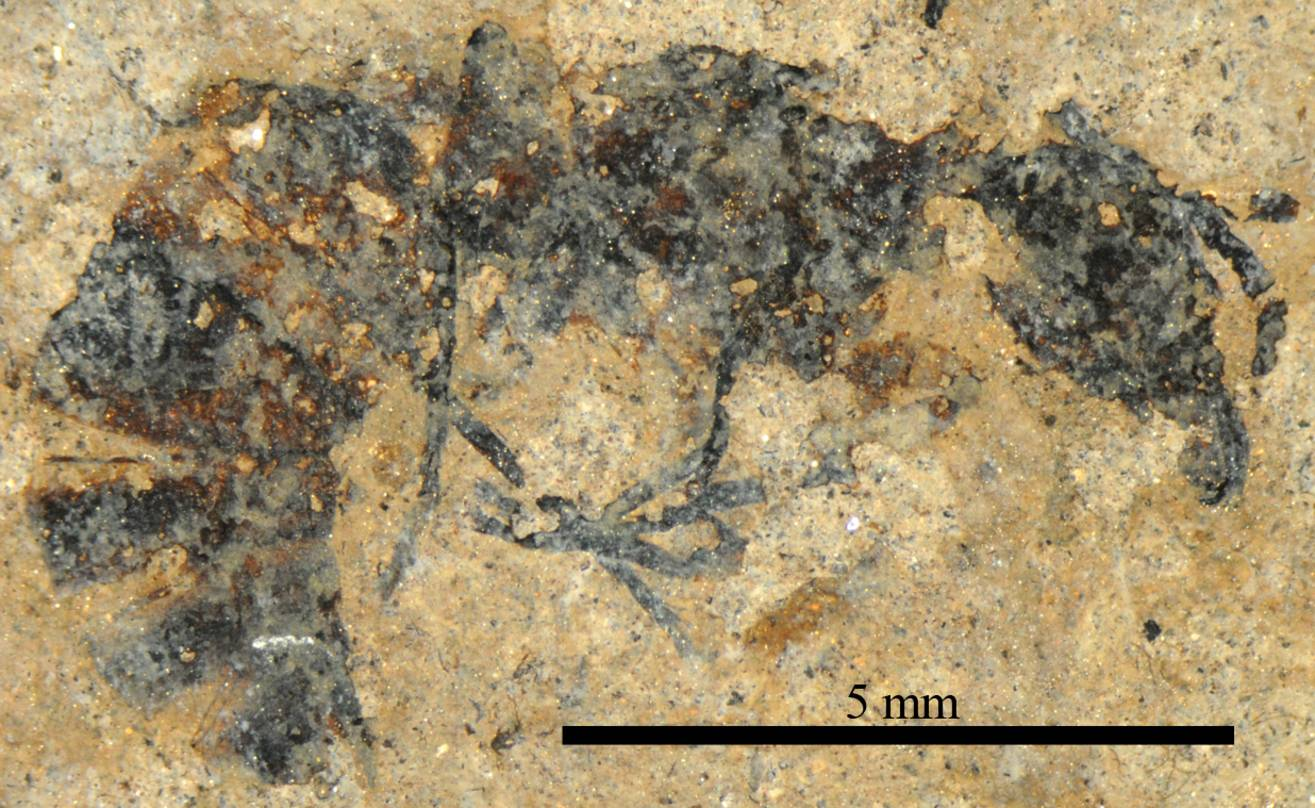
- P. petrosa holotype

Scientific classification
- Domain: Eukaryota
- Kingdom: Animalia
- Phylum: Arthropoda
- Class: Insecta
- Order: Hymenoptera
- Family: Formicidae
- Genus: Pachycondyla
- Species: †P. petrosa

Binomial name
- †Pachycondyla petrosa Dlussky & Wedmann, 2012

= Pachycondyla petrosa =

Pachycondyla petrosa Temporal range: Lutetian

Extinct species of ant

Pachycondyla petrosa is an extinct species of ant in the formicid subfamily Ponerinae described from a fossil found in Europe. P. petrosa is one of six Lutetian Pachycondyla species.

== History and classification ==
When described Pachycondyla petrosa was known from a single fossil insect which is a compression-impression fossil preserved in layers of soft sedimentary rock. Along with other well preserved insect fossils, the P. petrosa specimen was collected from layers of Lutetian Messel Formation rock in the Messel pit World Heritage Site. The Messel formation is composed of brown coals, oil shales, and bituminous shale, which preserved numerous insects, fish, birds, reptiles, and terrestrial mammals as a notable lagerstätten. The area is a preserved maar lake which initially formed approximately 47 million years ago as the result of volcanic explosions.

At the time of description, the holotype specimen, number SMF MeI 12273 was preserved in the Senckenberg Research Station Messel fossil collections. The fossil was first described by Gennady Dlussky and Sonja Wedmann in a 2012 paper on the poneromorph ants of Messel. In the type description, Dlussky and Wedmann named the species P. petrosa, with the specific epithet derived from the Greek "petros", which means stone.

The species is one of six Pachycondyla which have been described from Messel Formation fossils. All six of the species were described by Dlussky and Wedmann in the same 2012 paper, the other five being P. eocenica, P. lutzi, P.? messeliana, P. parvula, and P. petiolosa. Another eight fossil species have been described from fossils in North America, Europe, and Asia.

== Description ==
The Pachycondyla petrosa fossil is possibly either a queen or worker and preserved in lateral positioning. The ant has a body length of approximately 12.4 mm (0.49 in) and the head is 2.55 mm (0.100 in). The alitrunk is 3.25 mm (0.128 in) long, with the ant being described as being very similar to members of the genus Mesoponera, formerly considered a subgenus of Pachycondyla. Where preserved the generally triangular mandibles have large blocky teeth and comprise less than half the length of the head. The petiole is a triangle in side view, with a high scale, and a rounded apex.
