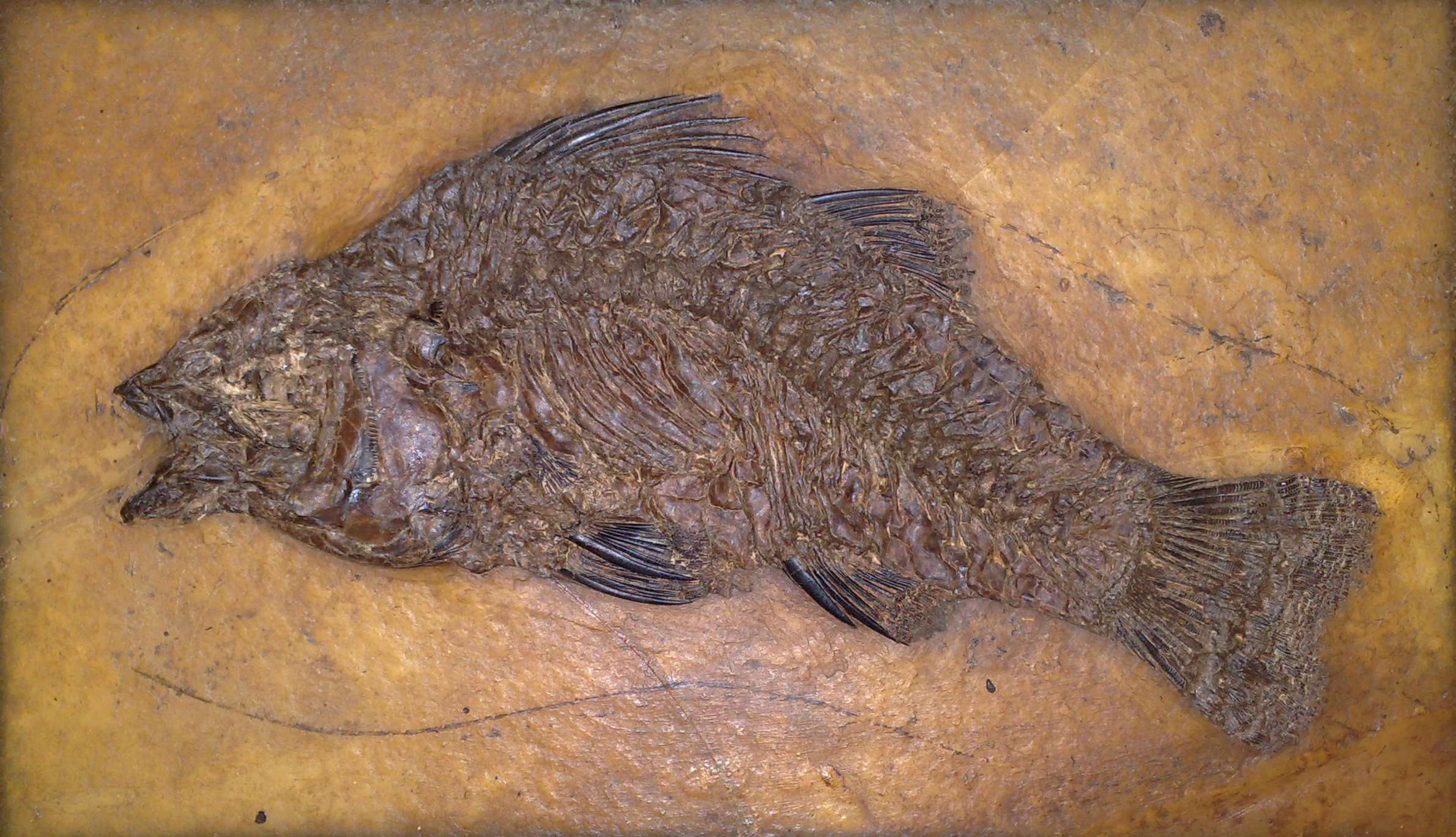
- Palaeoperca proxima fossil

Scientific classification
- Domain: Eukaryota
- Kingdom: Animalia
- Phylum: Chordata
- Class: Actinopterygii
- Order: Perciformes
- Family: Serranidae
- Genus: †Palaeoperca; Micklich, 1978

= Palaeoperca =

Palaeoperca Temporal range: Early- Middle Eocene

Extinct genus of fishes

Palaeoperca is an extinct genus of prehistoric bony fish that lived from the early to middle Eocene. Fossils were found in the Messel pit.
