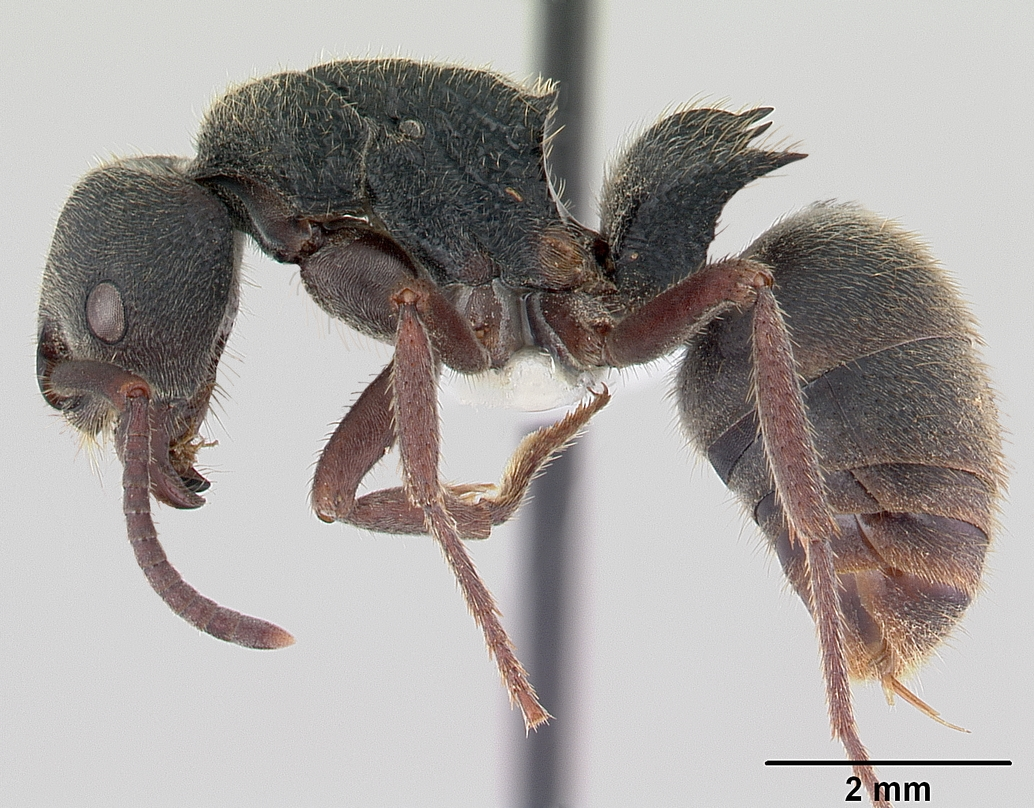
- Phrynoponera pulchella worker from Kenya

Scientific classification
- Domain: Eukaryota
- Kingdom: Animalia
- Phylum: Arthropoda
- Class: Insecta
- Order: Hymenoptera
- Family: Formicidae
- Genus: Phrynoponera
- Species: P. pulchella

Binomial name
- Phrynoponera pulchella Bolton, B. & Fisher, B. L., 2008

= Phrynoponera pulchella =

Species of ant

Phrynoponera pulchella is a species of ant in the subfamily Ponerinae. It was discovered and described by Bolton, B. & Fisher, B. L. in 2008.
