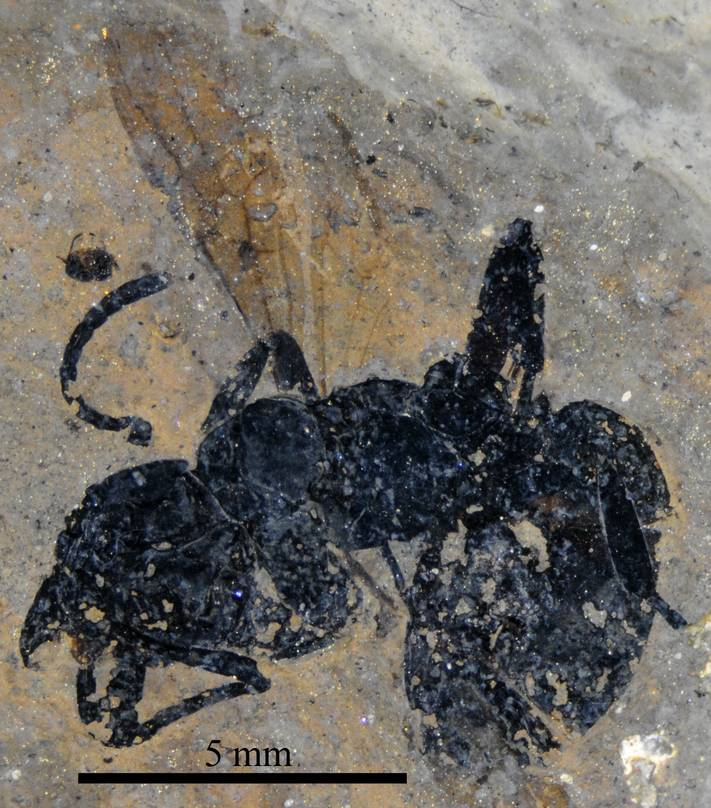
- P. lutzi holotype

Scientific classification
- Kingdom: Animalia
- Phylum: Arthropoda
- Clade: Pancrustacea
- Class: Insecta
- Order: Hymenoptera
- Family: Formicidae
- Genus: Pachycondyla
- Species: †P. lutzi

Binomial name
- †Pachycondyla lutzi Dlussky & Wedmann, 2012

= Pachycondyla lutzi =

Pachycondyla lutzi Temporal range: Lutetian

Extinct species of ant

Pachycondyla lutzi is an extinct species of ant in the formicid subfamily Ponerinae described from fossils found in Europe. P. lutzi is one of six Lutetian Pachycondyla species.

== History and classification ==
When described Pachycondyla lutzi was known from ten fossil insects which are compression-impression fossils preserved in layers of soft sedimentary rock. Along with other well preserved insect fossils, the P. lutzi specimens were collected from layers of the Lutetian Messel pit World Heritage Site. The formation is composed of brown coals, oil shales, and bituminous shale, which preserved numerous insects, fish, birds, reptiles, and terrestrial mammals as a notable lagerstätten. The area is a preserved maar lake which initially formed approximately 47 million years ago as the result of volcanic explosions.

At the time of description, the holotype specimen, number SMF MeI 11958, and the other nine specimens were preserved in the Senckenberg Research Station Messel fossil collections. The fossils were described by Gennady Dlussky and Sonja Wedmann in a 2012 paper on the poneromorph ants of Messel. The specific epithet "lutzi" was coined as a patronym honoring Herbert Lutz, one of the first paleoentomologists to study Messel ants.

The species is one of six Pachycondyla species which have been described from Messel Formation fossils. All six of the species were described by Dlussky and Wedmann in the same 2012 paper, the other five being P. eocenica, P.? messeliana, P. parvula, P. petiolosa, and P. petrosa. Another eight fossil species have been described from fossils in North America, Europe, and Asia.

== Description ==
Pachycondyla lutzi queens have a body length of approximately 11–15 mm (0.43–0.59 in) and the head is slightly wider than long with rounded rear corners. The front margin of the clypeus is generally gradually rounded, and in one specimen, shows a weak concavity of the middle area on the edge. Each of the mandibles are subtriangular and have five to six fairly large teeth each. The antennae are slender in appearance, composed of a scape which extends towards the rear margin of the head and gradually tapering flagellomeres. The eyes are nearly rounded in outline, being very short ovals, and placed to the front of the midpoint on the head. In the worker known, the scape is only as long as the occipital margin, unlike the queens. The gaster was not preserved on the fossil, making a total length hard to judge, though it is estimated at 8 mm (0.31 in).

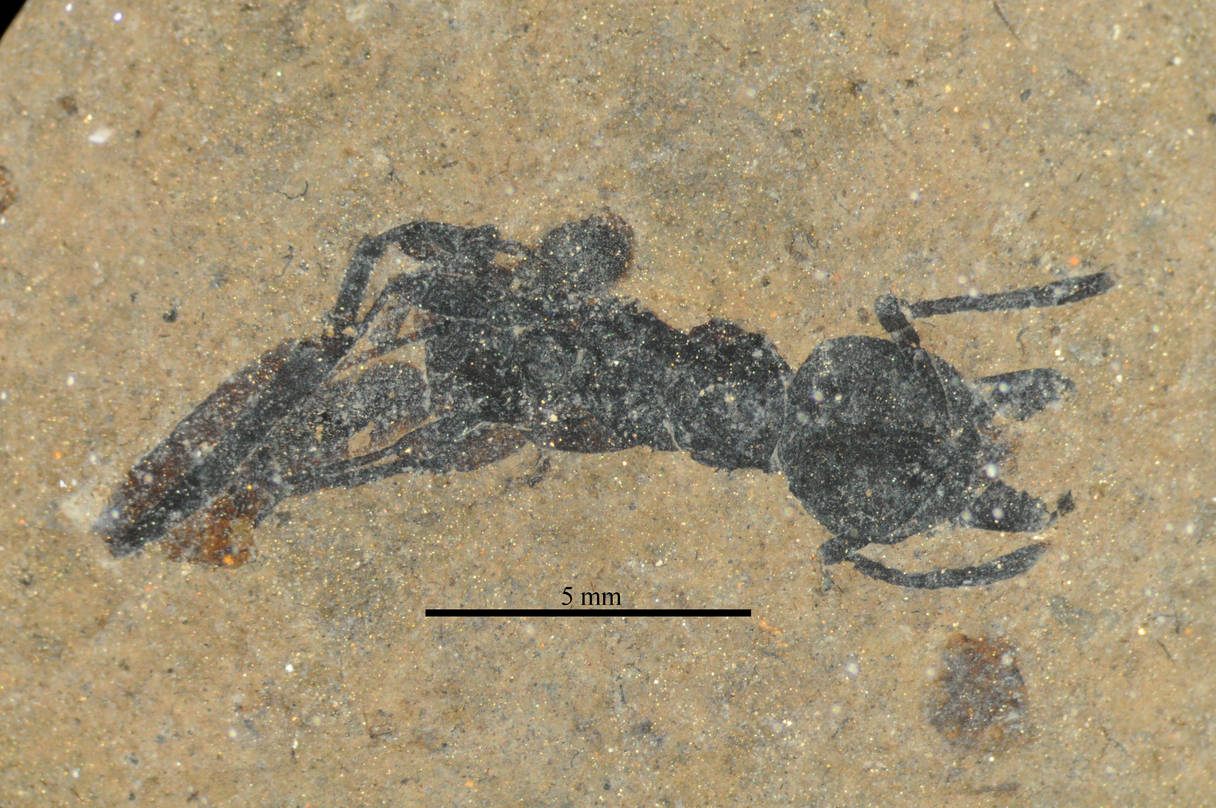
P. lutzi worker
