= Paraortygoides =

Paraortygoides Temporal range: Ypresian–Lutetian

Scientific classification
- Kingdom: Animalia
- Phylum: Chordata
- Class: Aves
- Family: †Gallinuloididae
- Genus: †Paraortygoides; Mayr, 2000

Type species
- Paraortygoides messelensis Mayr, 2000

Other species
- Paraortygoides argillae Mayr and Kitchener, 2024

Extinct genus of gallinuloidid bird

Paraortygoides is an extinct genus of gallinuloidid bird that lived in what is now Europe during the Ypresian and Lutetian stages of the Eocene epoch.

== Distribution ==
The type species, Paraortygoides messelensis, is known from the Messel Formation of Germany. Another species, Paraortygoides argillae, occurred in the Walton Member of the London Clay Formation of England.
