= Messel Pit =

Fossil site in Germany

Messel Formation
- Stratigraphic range: Middle Eocene (Early Lutetian), ~47 Ma
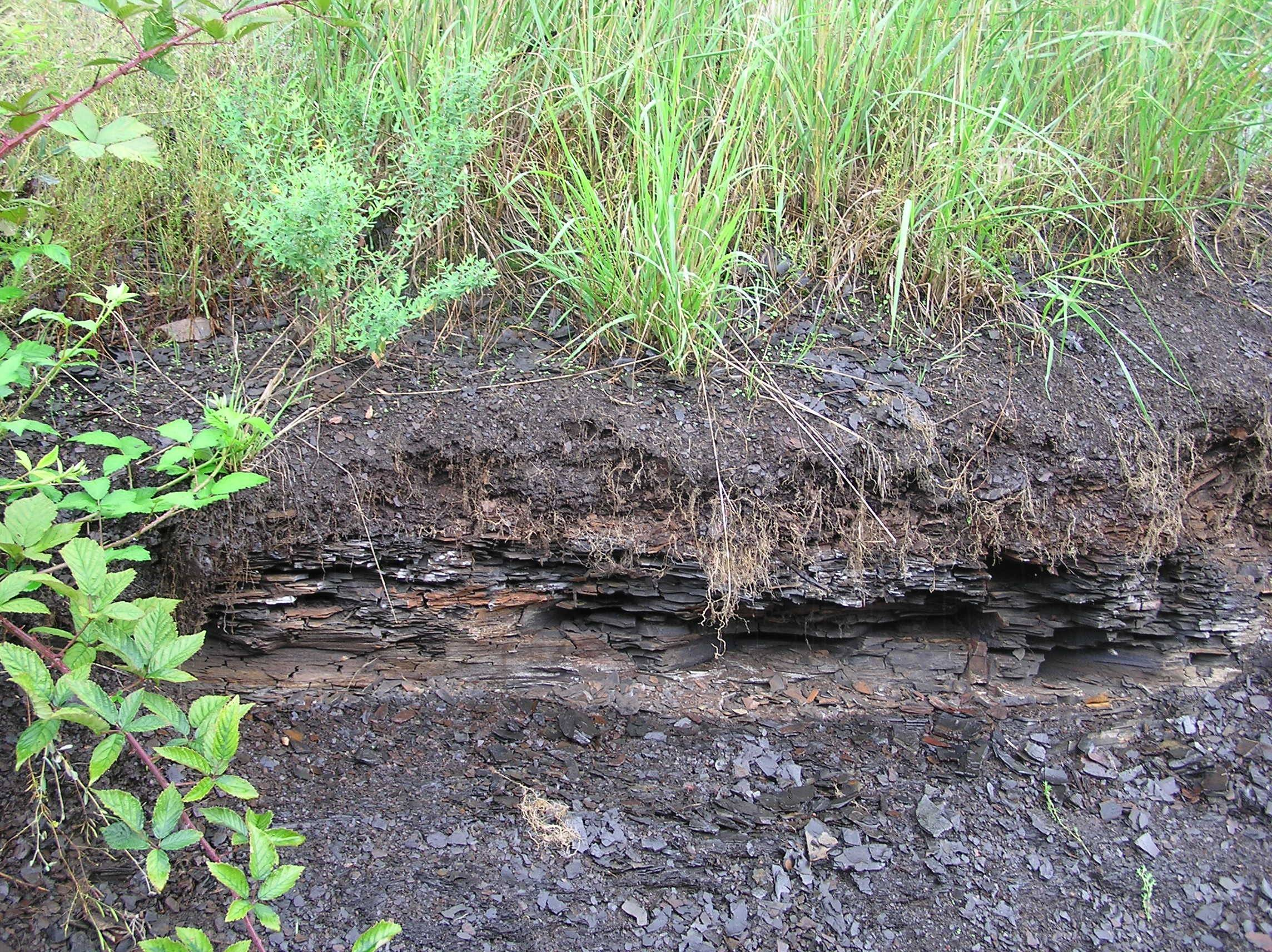
- Weathered bituminous shale of the Messel Formation
- Type: Formation
- Underlies: Eocene volcanic breccias
- Overlies: Rotliegend
- Thickness: around 200 metres (660 ft)

Location
- Region: Hesse
- Country: Germany

Type section
- Named for: Messel

The Messel Pit is a fossil preservation site in Hesse, central Germany, dated to the Eocene epoch (about 47 Ma). The fossil-bearing rock unit is a geologic formation named the Messel Formation; its geographic range is restricted to the Messel pit. There, the formation unconformably overlies crystalline Variscan basement and its Permian cover (Rotliegend) as well as Eocene volcanic breccias derived from the basement rocks. The formation mainly comprises lacustrine laminated bituminous shale ("oil shale") renowned for its content of fossils in exceptional preservation, particularly plants, arthropods and vertebrates (e.g. Darwinius masillae).

== Messel pit ==
Messel Pit Fossil Site
UNESCO World Heritage Site
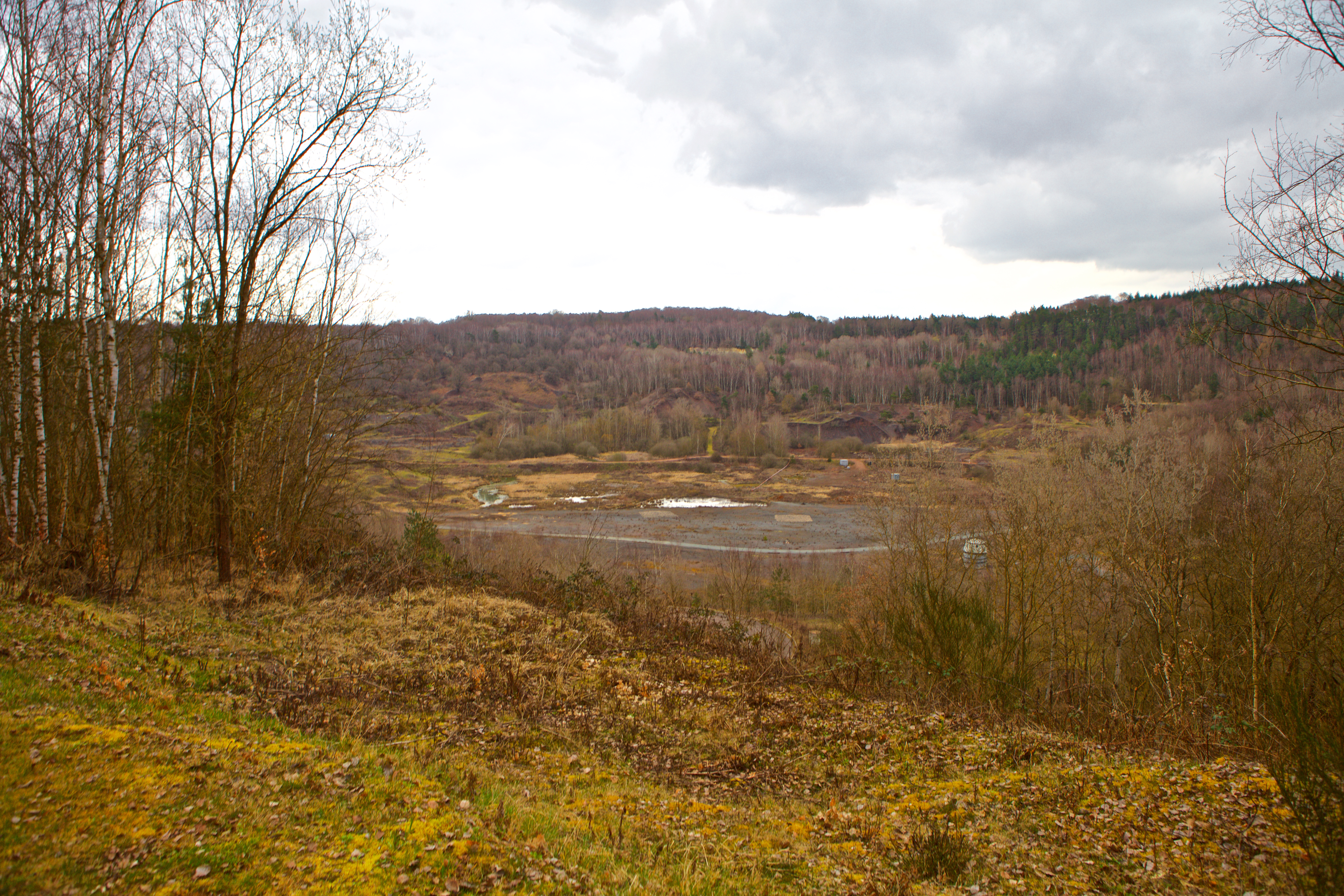

- Location within Hesse Location within Germany
- Location: Darmstadt-Dieburg, Hesse, Germany
- Criteria: Natural: (viii)
- Reference: 720bis
- Inscription: 1995 (19th Session)
- Extensions: 2010
- Area: 42 ha (100 acres)
- Buffer zone: 22.5 ha (56 acres)
- Coordinates: 49°55′03″N 8°45′24″E

The Messel pit (German: Grube Messel) is a disused quarry near the village of Messel (Landkreis Darmstadt-Dieburg, Hesse) about 35 km (22 mi) southeast of Frankfurt am Main, Germany. Bituminous shale was mined there. Because of its abundance of well-preserved fossils of the Messel Formation dating from the middle of the Eocene, it has significant geological and scientific importance. Over 1400 taxa of plants, fungi and animals have been documented at the site. After almost becoming a landfill, strong local resistance eventually stopped these plans and the Messel pit was declared a UNESCO World Heritage Site on 9 December 1995. Significant scientific discoveries about the early evolution of mammals and birds are still being made at the Messel Pit, and the site has increasingly become a tourist site as well.

=== History ===
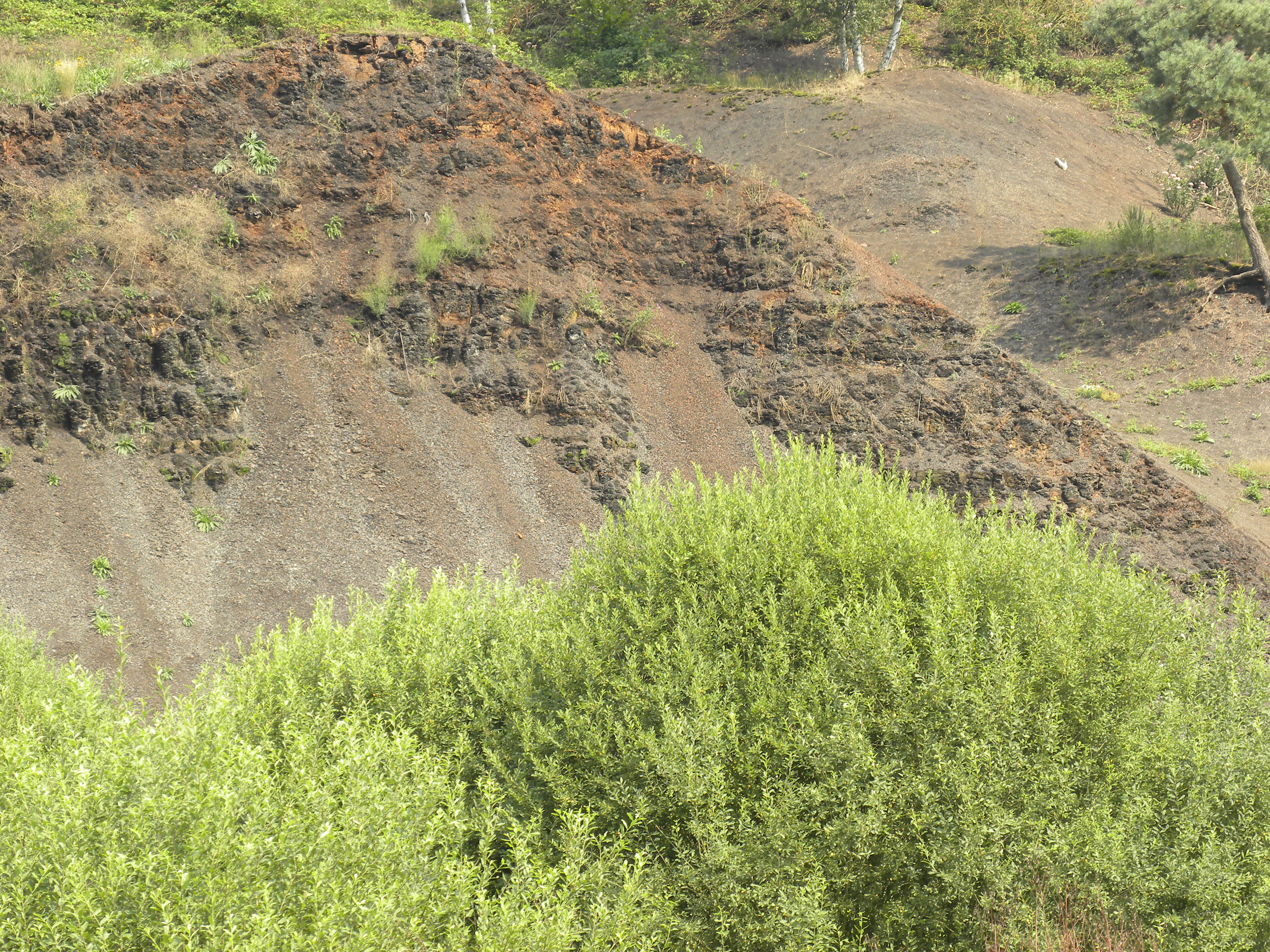
Outcrop of the Messel oil shale near the center of the pit

Brown coal and later oil shale was actively mined from 1859. The pit first became known for its wealth of fossils around 1900, but serious scientific excavation only started around the 1970s, when falling oil prices made mining the quarry uneconomical. Commercial oil shale mining ceased in 1971 and a cement factory built in the quarry failed the following year. The land was slated for use as a landfill, but the plans came to nought and the Hessian state bought the site in 1991 to secure scientific access. In the few years between the end of mining and 1974, when the state began preparing the site for garbage disposal, amateur collectors were allowed to collect fossils. The amateurs developed the "transfer technique" that enabled them to preserve the fine details of small fossils, the method still employed in preserving the fossils today.

Many of the known specimens from the site have come from amateur collectors and in 1996, an amnesty on previously collected fossils was put in effect, in the hope of getting privately owned collections back into public ownership and available to science.

=== Depositional characteristics ===
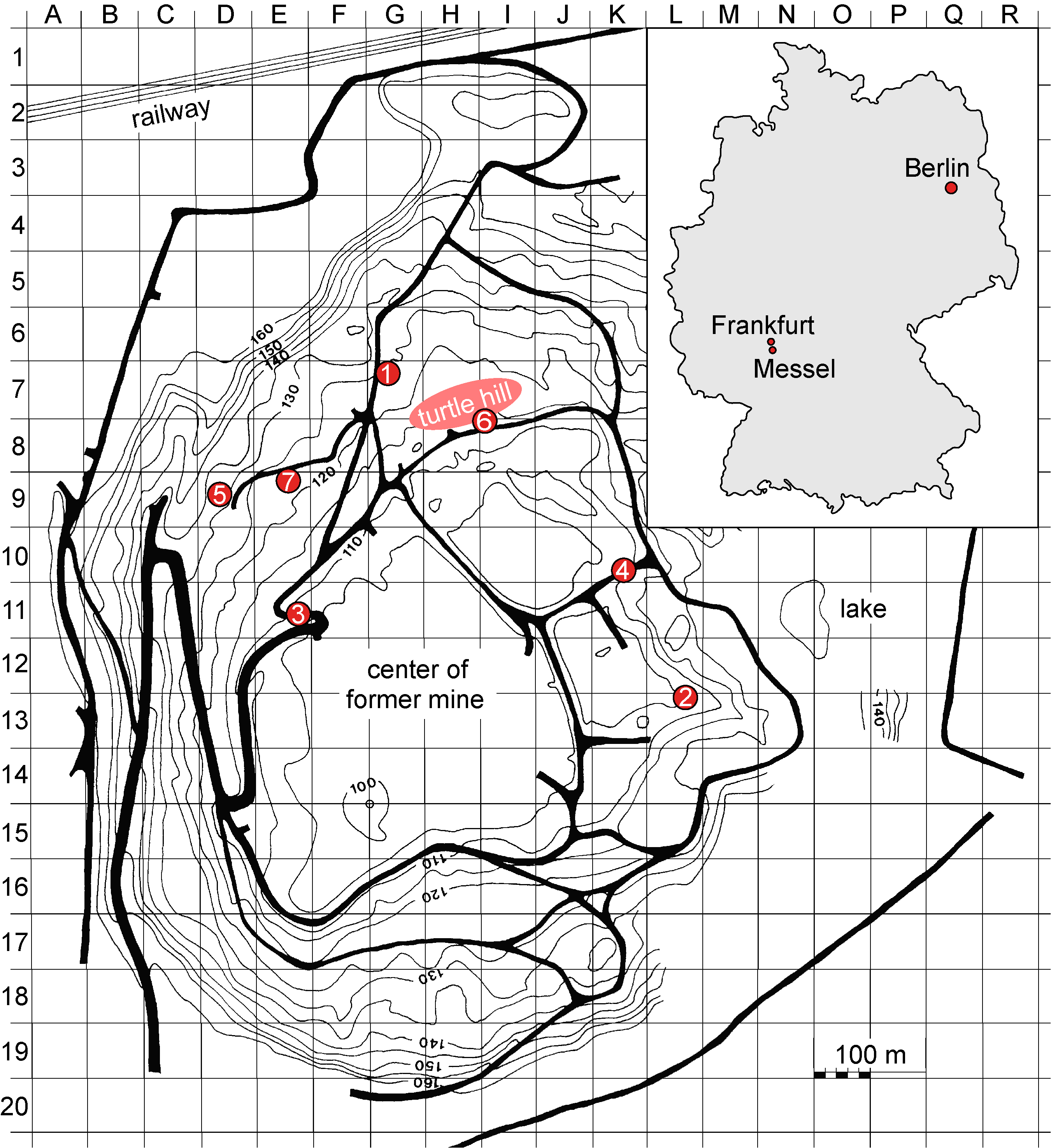
Inset map shows the location of the town and fossil locality of Messel near Frankfurt in the southwestern part of Germany. Larger map shows the locations of Messel primates 1–7 (Table 1) within the Messel oil shale excavation.

The current surface of the Messel pit is roughly 60 m (200 ft) below the local land and is about 0.7 km^{2} (0.27 sq mi) in area. The oil-shale bed originally extended to a depth of 190 m (620 ft). 47 million years ago in the Eocene when the Messel deposits formed, the area was 10° further south than it is now. The period was very close to the Early Eocene Climatic Optimum and the climate and ecology of the site were very different, characterised by a mean annual temperature of 22 °C and a large series of maar lakes surrounded by lush sub-tropical forests that supported an incredible diversity of life. The Messel lake bed was probably a center point for drainage from nearby rivers and creeks.

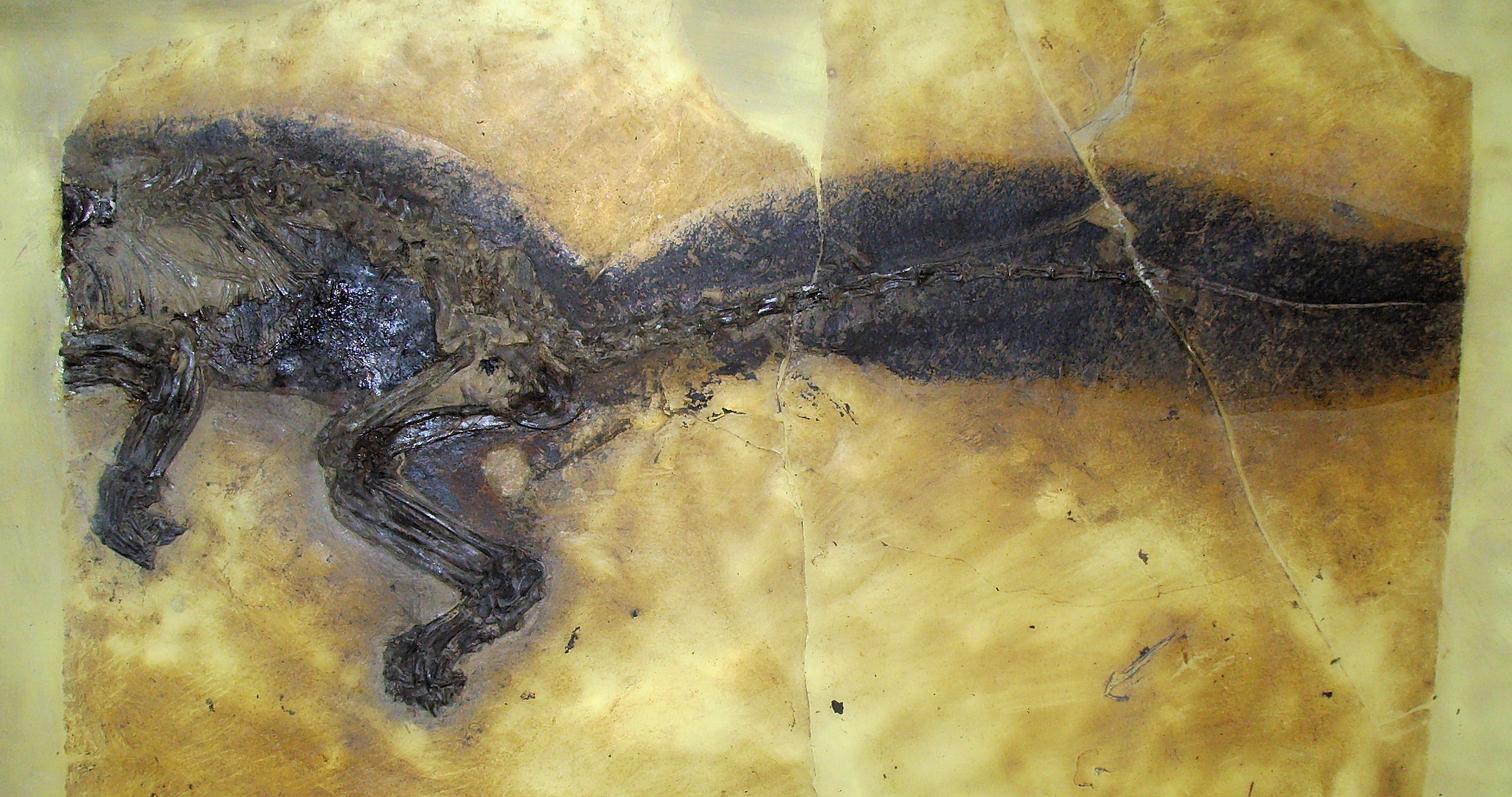
A fossil of the primitive mammal Kopidodon, showing outline of fur

The pit deposits were formed during the Eocene Epoch of the Paleogene Period about 47 million years ago, based on dating of basalt fragments underlying fossilbearing strata. Oil shale, formed by the slow anoxic deposition of mud and dead vegetation on the lake bed, is the primary rock at the site. Its sediments extend 13 m (43 ft) downward and lie atop an older sandstone foundation. The fossils within the shale show a remarkable clarity and preservation due to the unique depositional characteristics of the lake and so the Messel pit represents a Konservat-Lagerstätte. The upper stratifications of the lake most certainly supported a variety of organisms, but the bottom was subject to little disturbance by current, spawning a very anoxic environment. This prevented many epifaunal and infaunal species from inhabiting this niche and thus bioturbation was kept at a minimum. Overturn of the lake layers (caused by seasonal variations) lowered oxygen content near the surface and led to a periodic "die-off" of aquatic species. Combined with a relatively low rate of deposition, 0.1 mm (0.0039 in) per year, this provided a prime environment for the preservation of fauna and flora.

=== Volcanic gas releases ===
The area around the Messel Pit is believed to have been geologically and tectonically active during the Eocene. Some scientists, especially Jens Franzen, have hypothesized that events much like the 1986 volcanic gas releases at Lake Nyos, Cameroon, could account for the deaths and preservation in the lake of non-aquatic species. Periodic subsurface shifts possibly released large concentrations of toxic gases (such as carbon dioxide and hydrogen sulfide) into the lake and adjoining ecosystems, killing susceptible organisms. During these releases, birds and bats might have fallen in if near the lake surface and terrestrials could be overwhelmed when near the lake shore.

Other scientists, especially Wighart von Koenigswald, have hypothesized that cyanobacterial blooms could account for the rich faunal assemblage of Messel, with animals succumbing after drinking water contaminated with cyanobacterial toxins. This hypothesis drew support from the occurrence of gravid and or copulating animals at Messel, which supposedly reflect a dominant season of death.

Others explored the null hypothesis of accidental death. In particular, Krister T. Smith and colleagues found that the annual number of fossilized bats in Messel is comparable to the number of bats that drown in modern swimming pools. That is, bat mortality is not actually elevated at Messel, which fails to support the "mass mortality" hypotheses above.

Regardless of the manner of death, the exceptional preservation at Messel (e.g., mostly complete skeletons) indicates that the lake was very deep. Animals that fell in it drifted downwards into oxygen-poor water without scavengers, where they were overlaid by successive layers of mud that petrified later, thus producing an aggregation of fossils of exceptional quality, quantity, integrity, and variety.

=== Access ===
Exhibits from the pit may be seen in the Messel town, the fossil Museum in Messel, the Hessisches Landesmuseum in Darmstadt (5 km (3.1 mi) from Messel) and also the Senckenberg Museum in Frankfurt am Main (some 30 km (19 mi) from Messel). Casual visitors can park close to the pit and walk around 300 m (0.19 mi) to a viewing platform overlooking the pit. Entrance to the pit is only possible as part of a specially organized tour.

== Fossils ==
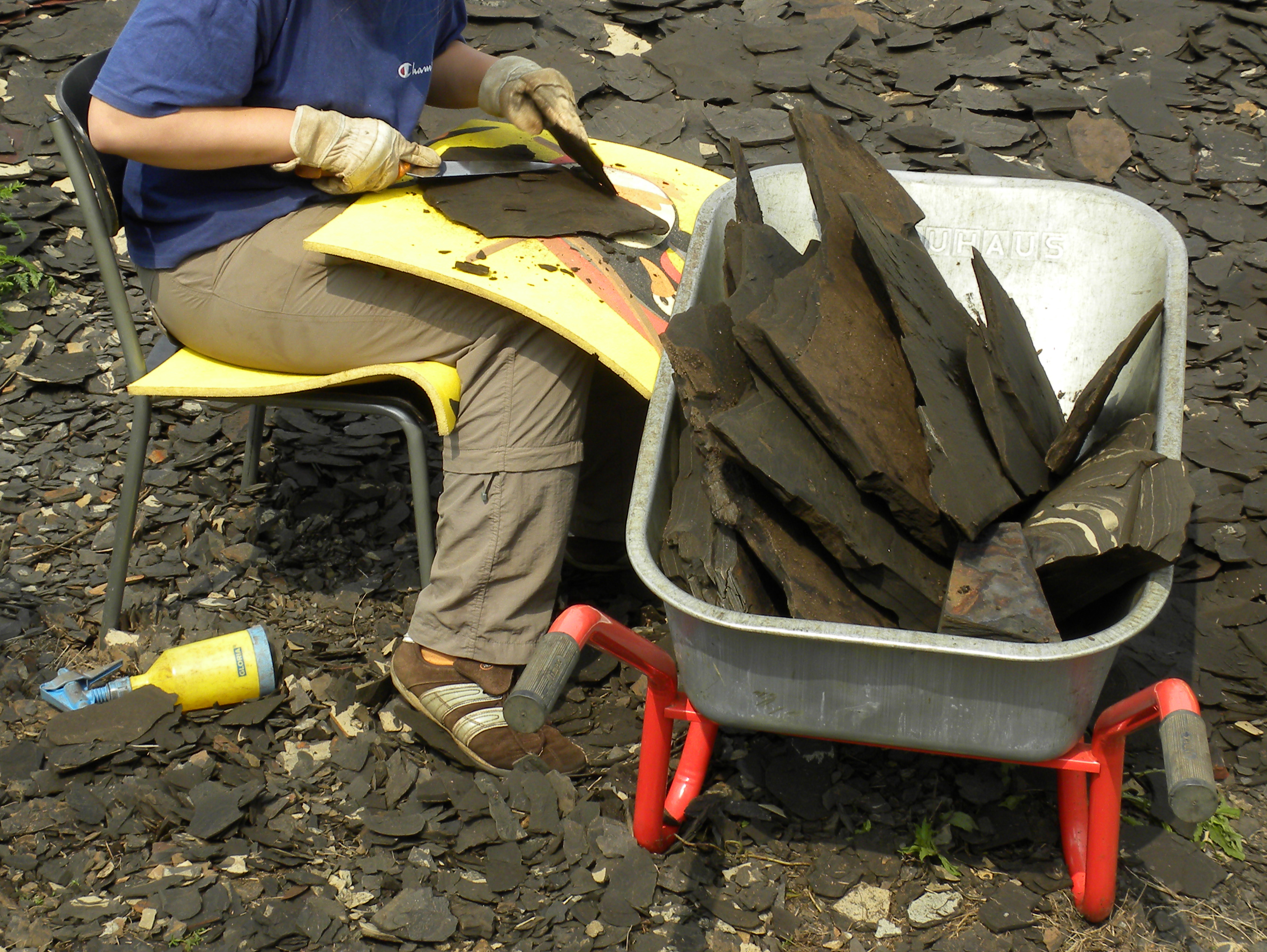
Splitting the shale with a large knife to reveal fossils

The Messel Pit provides the best preserved evidence of Geiseltalian flora and fauna so far discovered, with over 1400 taxa identified. Most other sites are lucky to contain partial skeletons, but Messel boasts extensive preservation of structural integrity, even going so far as to preserve the fur, feathers and "skin shadows" of some species. Unusual preservation has sparked some closely reasoned interpretations. The symptomatic "dumb-bell"-shaped bite marks on either side of the leaf vein on a fossilised leaf have been identified as the death-grip of a carpenter ant terminally parasitized by the fungus Ophiocordyceps unilateralis, that, apparently then as today, commandeered its behavior, in order to release its spores from a favourable location; it is the earliest concrete sample of fungal behavioural manipulation.

The diversity of species is remarkable partly as a result of the hypothesized periodic gas releases. A brief summary of some of the fossils found at the site follows:

- Nine mating pairs of fossil turtles have been found. The turtles, Allaeochelys crassesculpta, were in coitus (in the act of having sex). They are male-female pairs, with the male's tail tucked under the female, which is how they copulate. Their death must have been rapid. It is supposed that the turtles had started mating in the aerated surface waters of the ancient lake. As they sank into deeper water, they were overcome by the release of toxic volcanic gas. They were then buried in the lakebed sediment. Turtles belonging to this clade are still living. They have lost their reptilian scales, and their skin absorbs oxygen from the water. Normally, this is an advantage: it helps them stay submerged for long periods. However, under anoxic conditions it is a disadvantage, because carbon dioxide and dissolved poisons are absorbed as well.
- Over 10,000 fossilized fish of numerous species
- Thousands of aquatic and terrestrial insects, some with distinct coloration still preserved
- Innumerable small mammals including pygmy horses, large mice, primates, ground dwellers (hedgehogs, marsupials, pangolins), aardvark relatives and bats. The fossilized bat specimens have provided insights into the evolution of echolocation.
- Large numbers of birds, particularly predatory species.
- Crocodiles, frogs, turtles, salamanders and other reptiles or amphibians
- Remains of over 30 distinct plant species, including palm leaves, fruits, pollen, wood, walnuts and grapevines

The following is only a partial list:

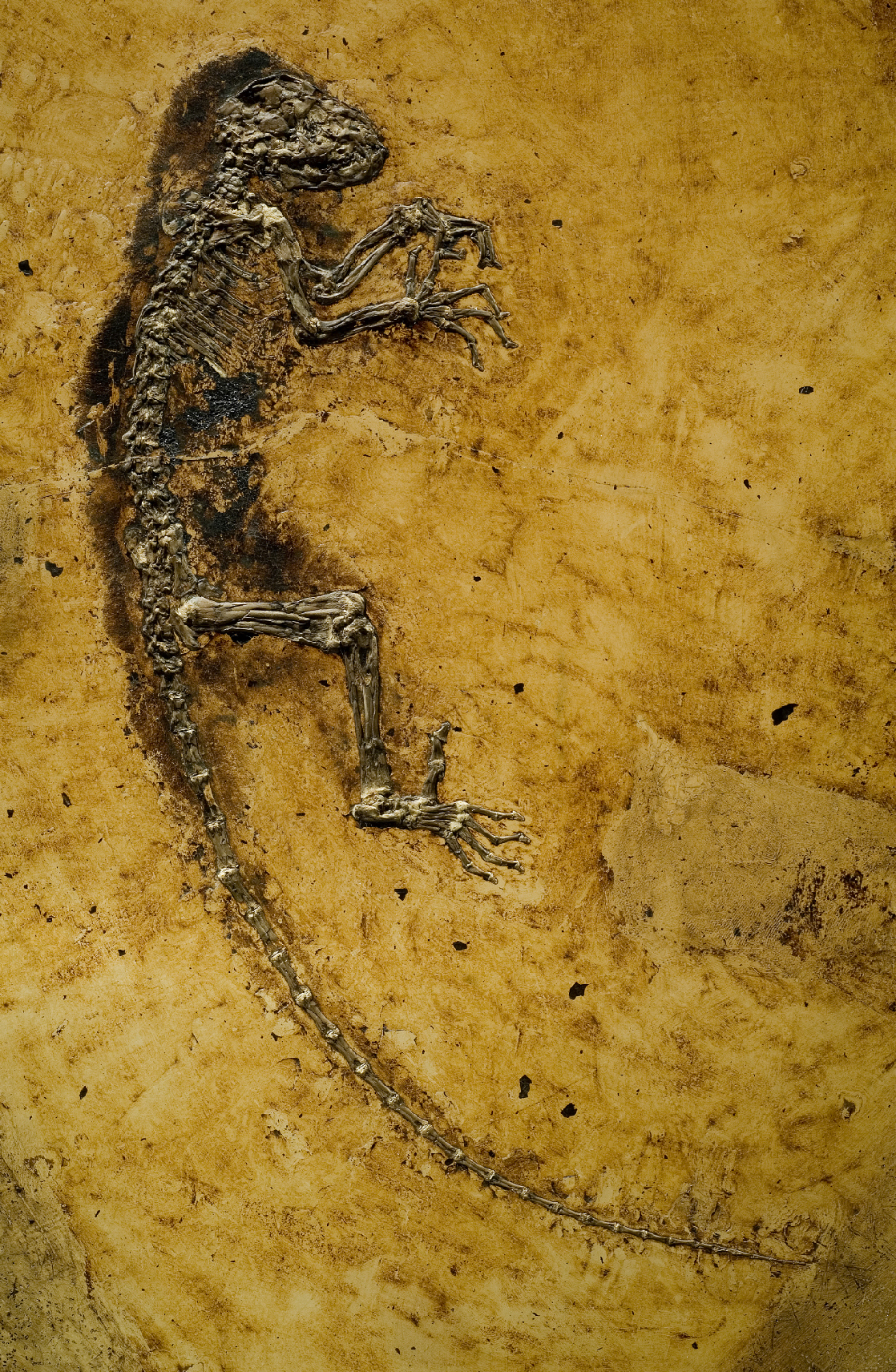
Darwinius masillae (holotype) showing the remarkable preservation at Messel

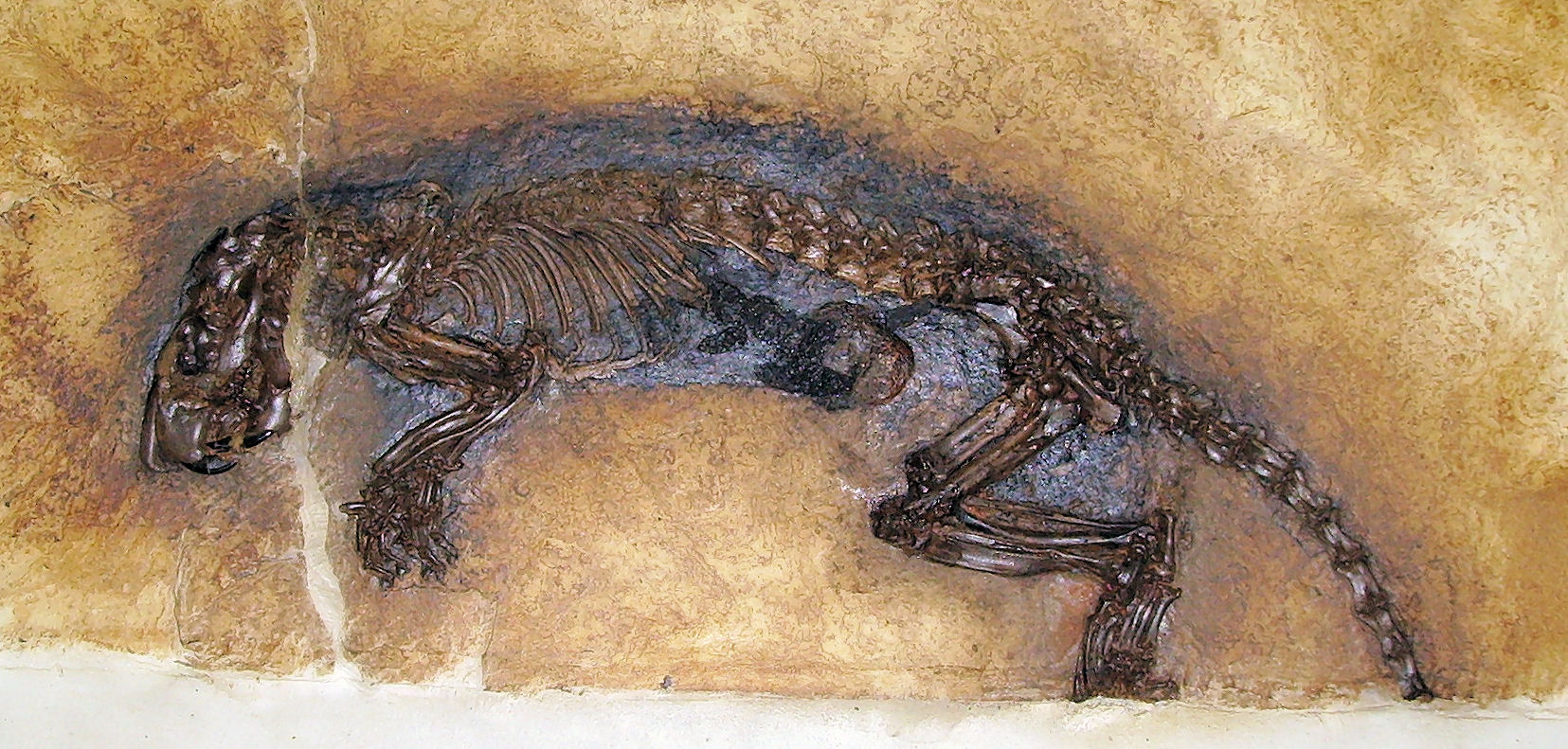
Masillamys at the Senckenberg collection

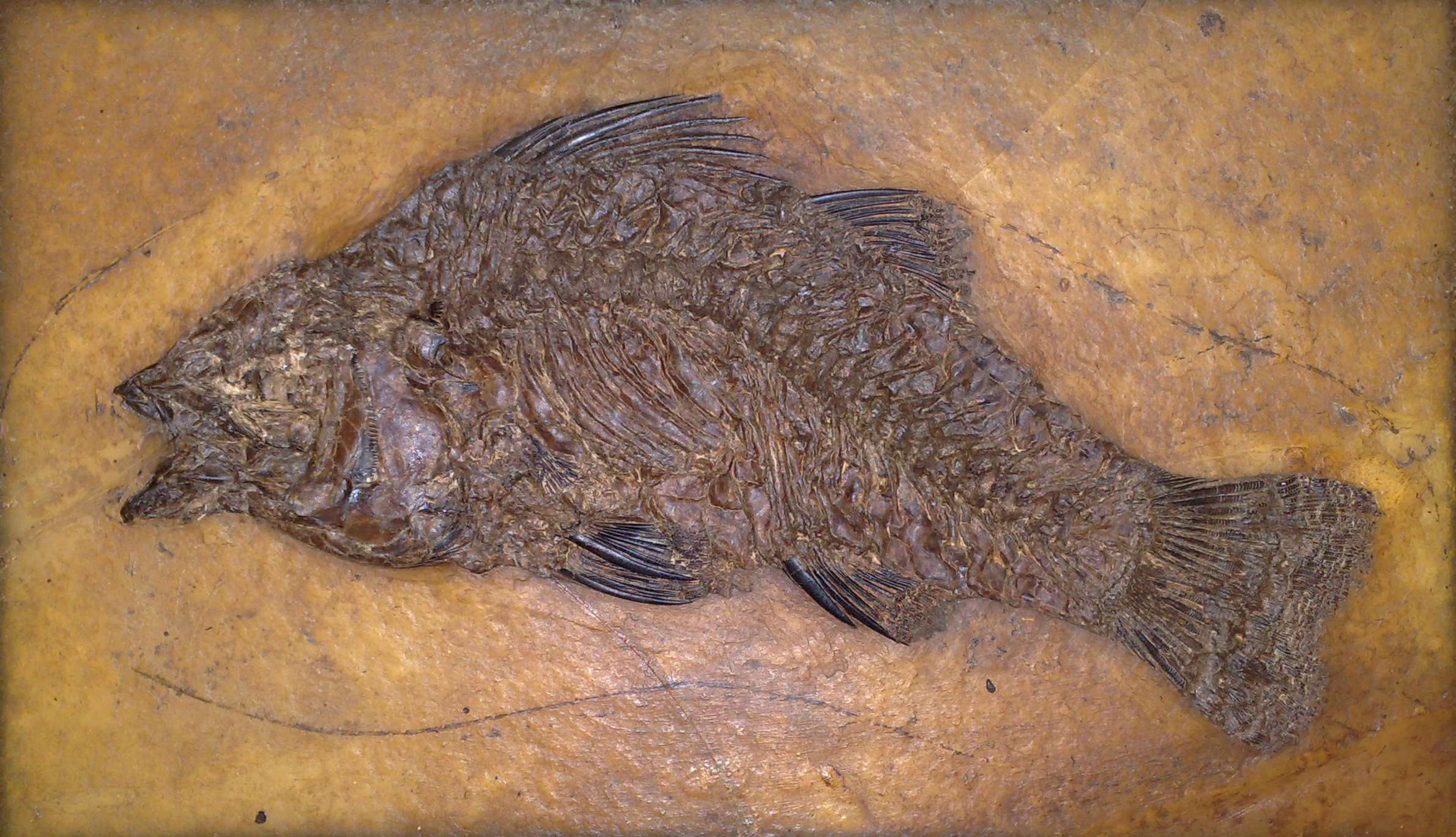
Early perch Palaeoperca proxima

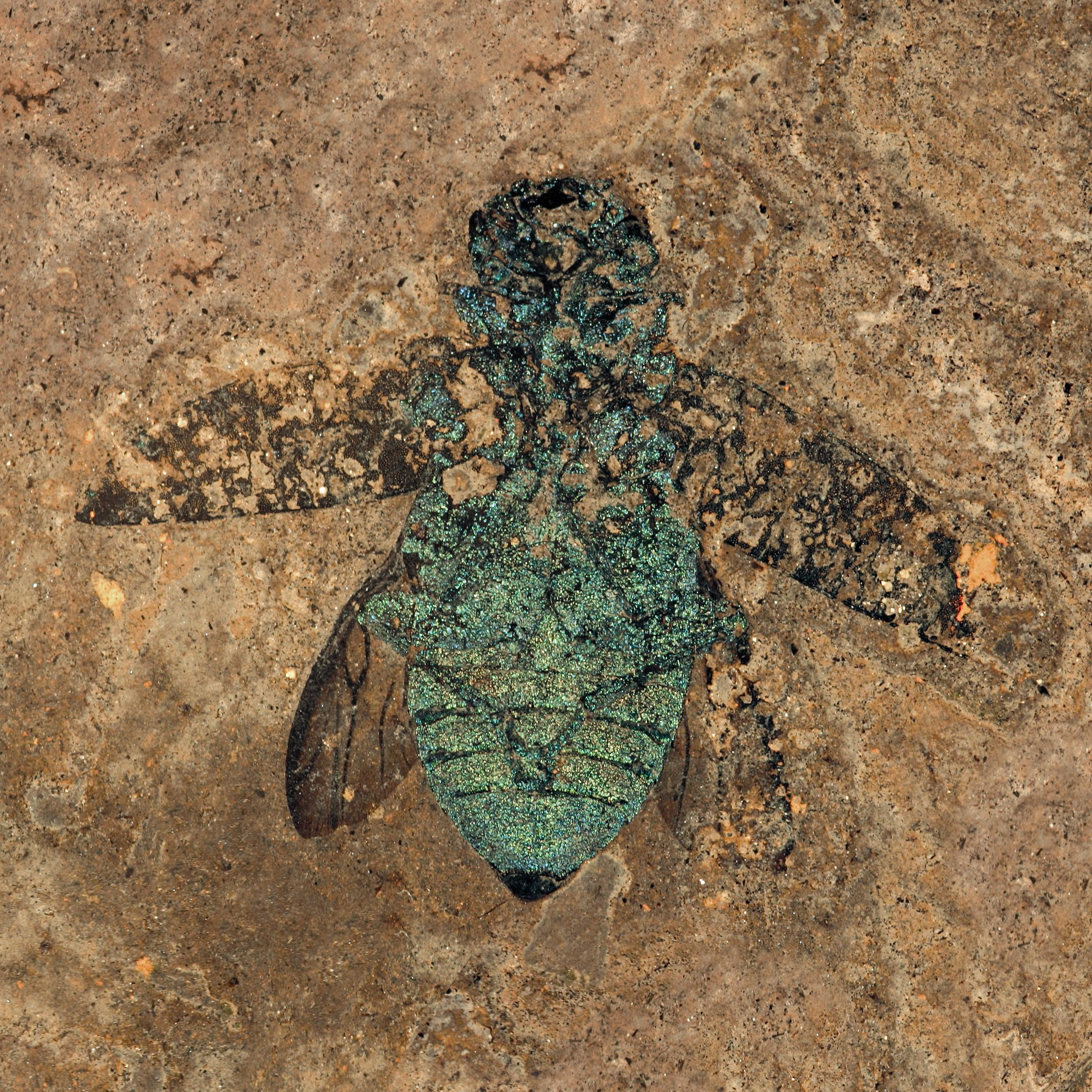
Fossil jewel beetle, still showing the (structural) colour of the exoskeleton

=== Mammals ===
Darwinius masillae, identified in 2009 as an adapiform primate
Kopidodon, an extinct arboreal cimolestan
Leptictidium, an extinct omnivorous hopping mammal (of the leptictid family)
Propalaeotherium, an early relative of horses
Ailuravus, a rodent
Peradectes, a metatherian
Palaeochiropteryx, an early bat
Lesmesodon, a small hyaenodontid
Eomanis, an early pangolin
Eurotamandua, a scaleless, anteater-like pangolin
Europolemur, a primate
Hyrachyus, ancestor of rhinoceroses
Paroodectes, an early carnivorous mammal
Messelogale, an early carnivorous mammal
Pholidocercus, an early hedgehog
Macrocranion, an early long-tailed hedgehog
Masillamys, an early rodent
Messelobunodon, an early artiodactyl
Godinotia, an early primate
Buxolestes, a semiaquatic, otter-like cimolestan
Hassianycteris, an early bat
Archaeonycteris, an early bat
Tachypteron, a possible emballonurid or miniopterid bat

=== Birds ===
Aenigmatorhynchus, an unusual bird of uncertain affinities
Palaeotis, an early struthionid
Strigogyps sapea (formerly Aenigmavis) a cariamiform
Eocoracias, an early coraciiform with known coloration
Messelornis, the Messel-bird; a species of gruiform
Masillastega, a freshwater sulid
Lapillavis, a possible trogonid relative
Cypseloramphus, a basal apodiform
The Messelasturidae (Messelastur and Tynskya), carnivorous relatives of modern parrots
Palaeoglaux, an early owl with enigmatic breast feathers
Masillastrix blattophaga, a young owl described in 2026 whose last meal, an iridescent cockroach, is preserved in its stomach; the find was cited as evidence that some early owls were active by day
Paraprefica, an early potoo
Paraortygoides, a galliform
Masillaraptor, an early falconiform
Parargornis, an early apodiform
Messelirrisor, a tiny bucerotiform closely related to hoopoes and wood-hoopoes
Selmes (an anagram of "Messel"), a mousebird with stubby toes
Gastornis (formerly Diatryma), a large, flightless galloansere
Hassiavis, a member of Cypselomorphae
Quasisyndactylus, a member of Alcediniformes
Vanolimicola, a possible charadriiform
A currently unnamed lithornithid, a sandpiper-like paleognath, the first record of its kind in Middle Eocene Europe.

=== Reptiles ===
Asiatosuchus, a large crocodile
Diplocynodon, an alligator
Hassiacosuchus, a durophagous alligator
Bergisuchus, a sebecosuchian crocodiliform
Eoconstrictor, 2-m snakes related to Neotropical boas, Boinae
Messelophis, a tiny, live-bearing or viviparous boa
Messelopython, the oldest known relative of pythons
Cryptolacerta, a lizard with affinities to amphisbaenians
Geiseltaliellus, a lizard with affinities to Corytophaninae
Allaeochelys crassesculpta, aquatic turtles related to Carettochelys

=== Fish ===
A bowfin, variously described as Amia (the modern genus) or Cyclurus
Amphiperca, an early perch
Palaeoperca, another early perch
Atractosteus, a gar
eel

=== Insects ===
Hemiptera

- Wedelphus dichopteroides Szwedo & Wappler, 2006

Hymenoptera

Family Formicidae (ants)

- Casaleia eocenica Dlussky & Wedmann, 2012
- Cephalopone – Cephalopone grandis and Cephalopone potens
- Cyrtopone – Cyrtopone curiosa, Cyrtopone elongata, Cyrtopone microcephala, and Cyrtopone striata
- Gesomyrmex pulcher Dlussky, Wappler, & Wedmann, 2009
- Messelepone leptogenoides Dlussky & Wedmann, 2012
- Pachycondyla eocenica Dlussky & Wedmann, 2012
- Pachycondyla lutzi Dlussky & Wedmann, 2012
- Pachycondyla? messeliana Dlussky & Wedmann, 2012
- Pachycondyla parvula (Dlussky, Rasnitsyn, & Perfilieva, 2015)
- Pachycondyla petiolosa Dlussky & Wedmann, 2012
- Pachycondyla petrosa Dlussky & Wedmann, 2012
- Protopone – Protopone? dubia, Protopone germanica, Protopone magna, Protopone oculata, Protopone sepulta, and Protopone vetula
- Pseudectatomma – Pseudectatomma eocenica and Pseudectatomma striatula
- Titanomyrma gigantea
- Titanomyrma simillima

Family Apidae

- Protobombus messelensis Engel & Wappler, 2003

Family Megachilidae

- Friccomelissa schopowi Wedmann, Wappler, & Engel, 2009

=== IUGS geological heritage site ===
Describing the Messel Pit Fossil Site as 'richest geosite in the world for understanding the living environment of the Eocene, as it includes exceptionally well-preserved fossils', the International Union of Geological Sciences (IUGS) included the site's Eocene record in its list of 100 'geological heritage sites', published in October 2022. The organisation defines an IUGS Geological Heritage Site as 'a key place with geological elements and/or processes of international scientific relevance, used as a reference, and/or with a substantial contribution to the development of geological sciences through history.'

== See also ==
- Lagerstätte
- List of fossil sites (with link directory)
- List of fossiliferous stratigraphic units in Germany
- Paleofauna of the Messel Formation
- Paleoflora of the Messel Formation
