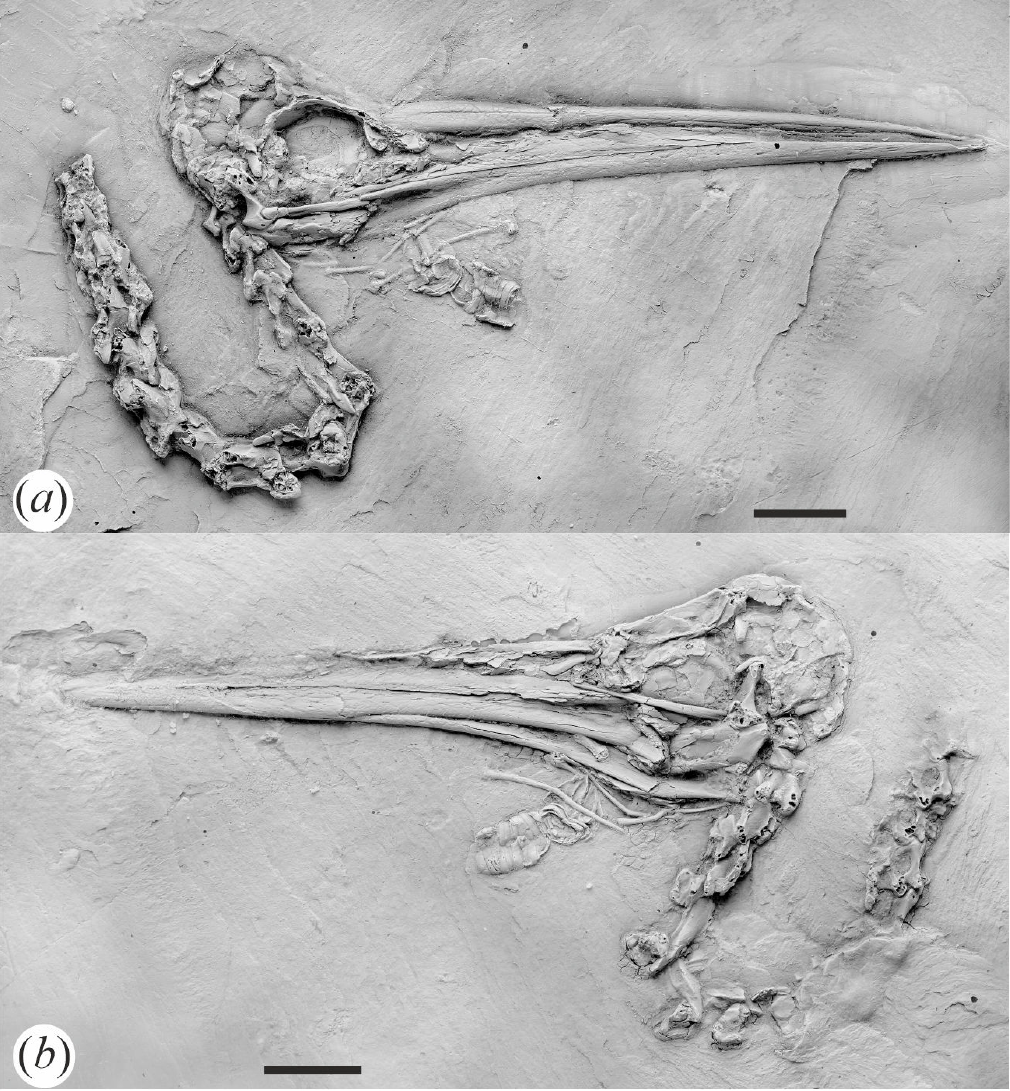
- Skull referred to Aenigmatorhynchus

Scientific classification
- Kingdom: Animalia
- Phylum: Chordata
- Clade: Ornithurae
- Class: Aves
- Order: incertae sedis
- Genus: †Aenigmatorhynchus; Mayr & Smith, 2025
- Species: †A. rarus

Binomial name
- †Aenigmatorhynchus rarus Mayr & Smith, 2025

= Aenigmatorhynchus =

Aenigmatorhynchus Temporal range: Eocene, ~48 Ma

Genus of extinct birds

Aenigmatorhynchus (meaning "riddle beak") is an unusual extinct bird genus of uncertain affinities known from the mid-Eocene Messel Pit of Germany. The genus contains a single species, Aenigmatorhynchus rarus, known from an isolated skull preserved as a part and counterpart. While the beak anatomy is somewhat reminiscent of living birds like oystercatchers and stilts, several anatomical features preclude the referral of Aenigmatorhynchus to these groups. The prominent coronoid processes on its beak suggest it may have fed on hard-shelled animals that it cracked with the rear portion of its beak.

== Discovery and naming ==
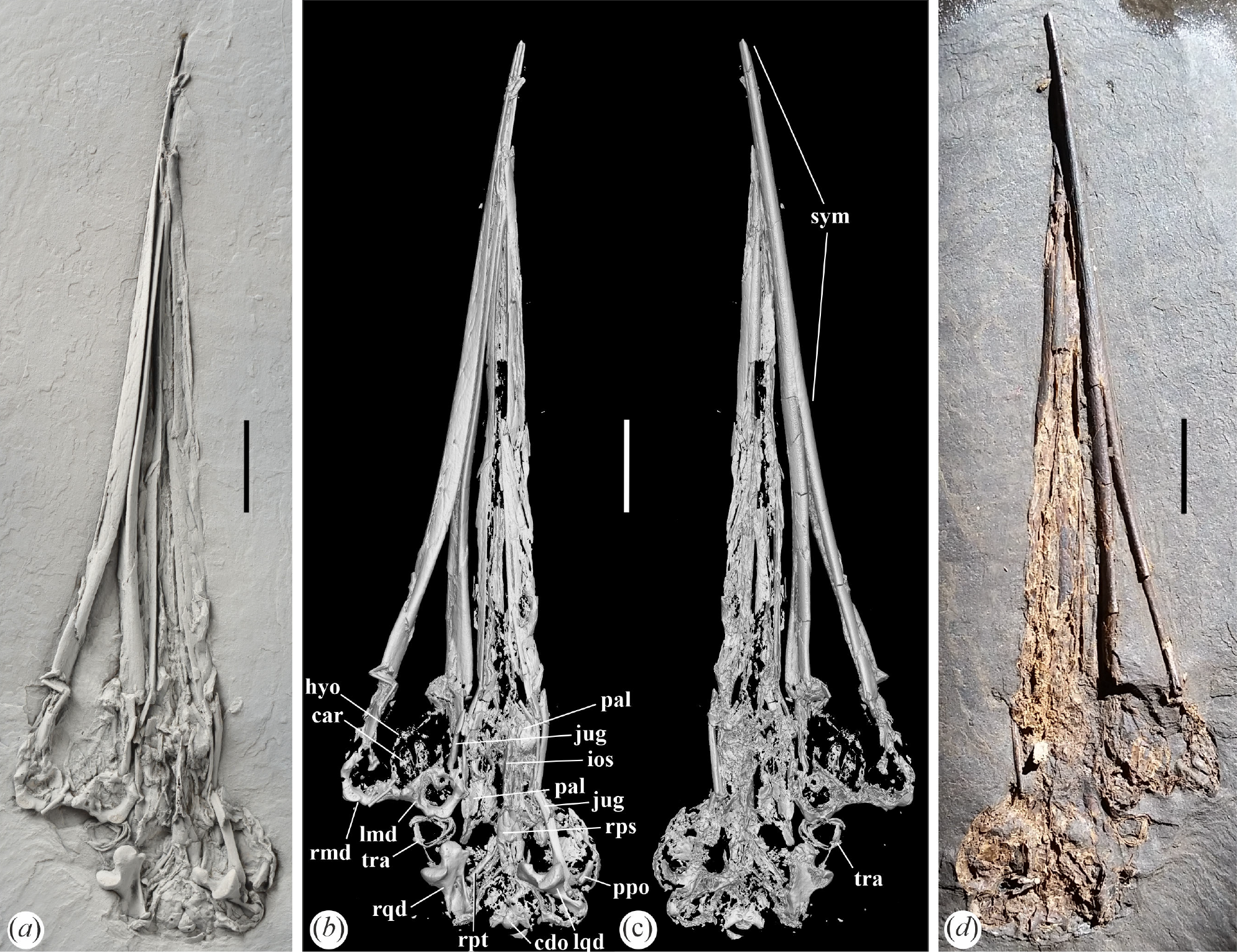
Photographs (a, d) and μCT renderings (b, c) of the holotype skull

The Aenigmatorhynchus holotype specimen, SMF-ME 11857, was discovered in 2022 in the well-known Messel Pit fossil site near Darmstadt, Germany, representing outcrops of the Messel Formation. The specimen consists of a complete and articulated—albeit isolated—skull, preserved in dorsal/ventral view as a part and counterpart. An additional specimen of this species is housed in the personal collection of Dr. Burkhard Pohl. It comprises a skull and neck preserved in lateral view, also on a slab and counterslab. Since it is part of a private collection, little research can be done and scientifically published on it.

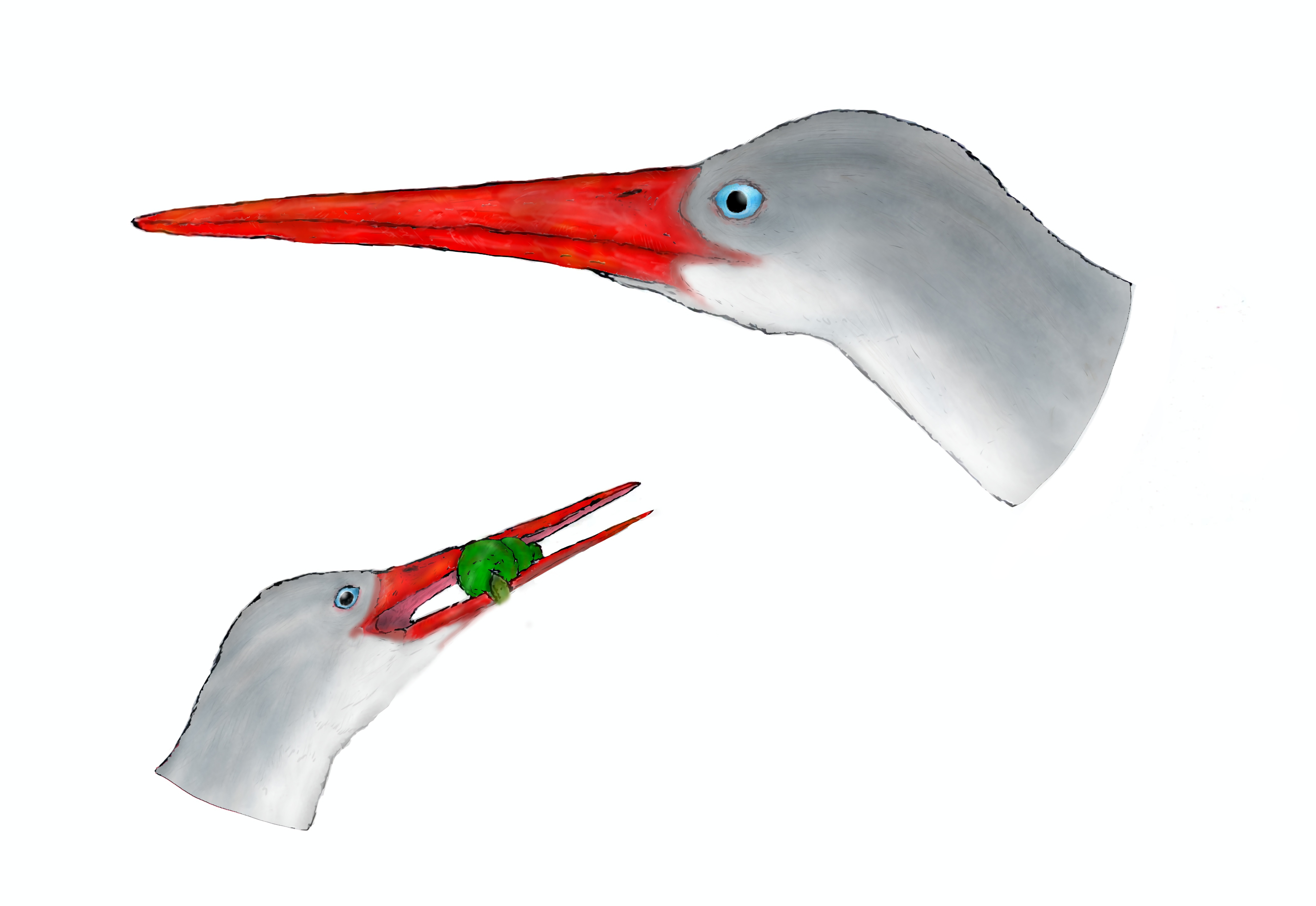
Speculative life restoration of A. rarus eating a freshwater snail (Viviparus sp.)

In 2025, Gerald Mayr and Krister Smith described Aenigmatorhynchus rarus as a new genus and species of birds based on these fossil remains. The generic name, Aenigmatorhynchus, combines the Latin word aenigma (from the Greek αἴνιγμα, or 'speaking in riddles'), meaning 'riddle', with the Greek ῥύγχος (rýnchos), meaning 'beak'. This refers to the unusual and surprising distribution of characters observed in the mandible of the species. The specific name, rarus, is a Latin word referring to the presence of only one skull of the species in a public collection.
