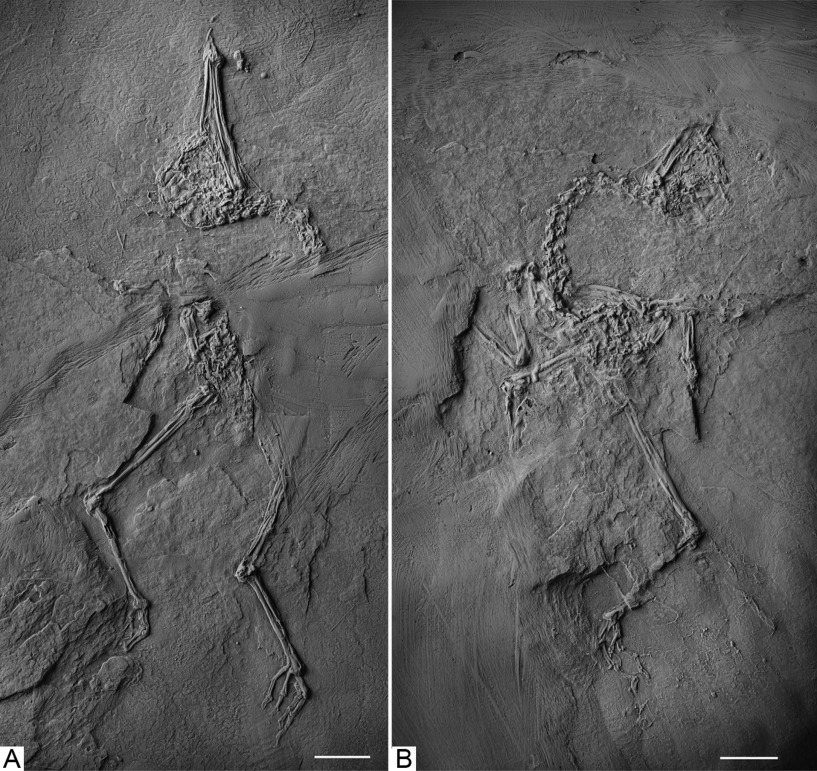
- 2 fossil samples of the Vanolimicola of Messel, Germany

Scientific classification
- Kingdom: Animalia
- Phylum: Chordata
- Class: Aves
- Genus: †Vanolimicola
- Species: †V. longihallucis

Binomial name
- †Vanolimicola longihallucis Mayr, 2017

= Vanolimicola =

Vanolimicola Temporal range: Lutetian

Extinct genus of birds

Vanolimicola is an extinct genus of birds that lived during the Lutetian stage of the Eocene epoch.

== Distribution ==
Vanolimicola longihallucis is known from the Messel Formation of Germany.
