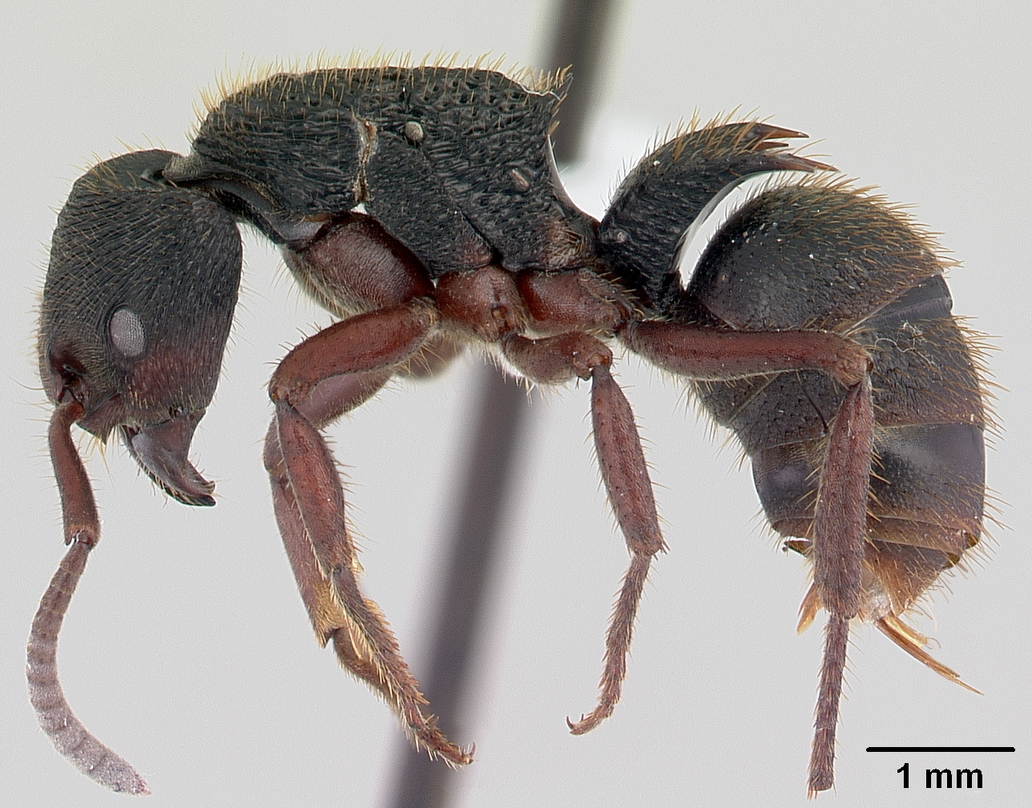
- Phrynoponera transversa worker from Gabon

Scientific classification
- Domain: Eukaryota
- Kingdom: Animalia
- Phylum: Arthropoda
- Class: Insecta
- Order: Hymenoptera
- Family: Formicidae
- Genus: Phrynoponera
- Species: P. transversa

Binomial name
- Phrynoponera transversa Bolton, B. & Fisher, B. L., 2008

= Phrynoponera transversa =

Species of ant

Phrynoponera transversa is a species of ponerine ant described by Bolton, B. & Fisher, B. L. in 2008.
