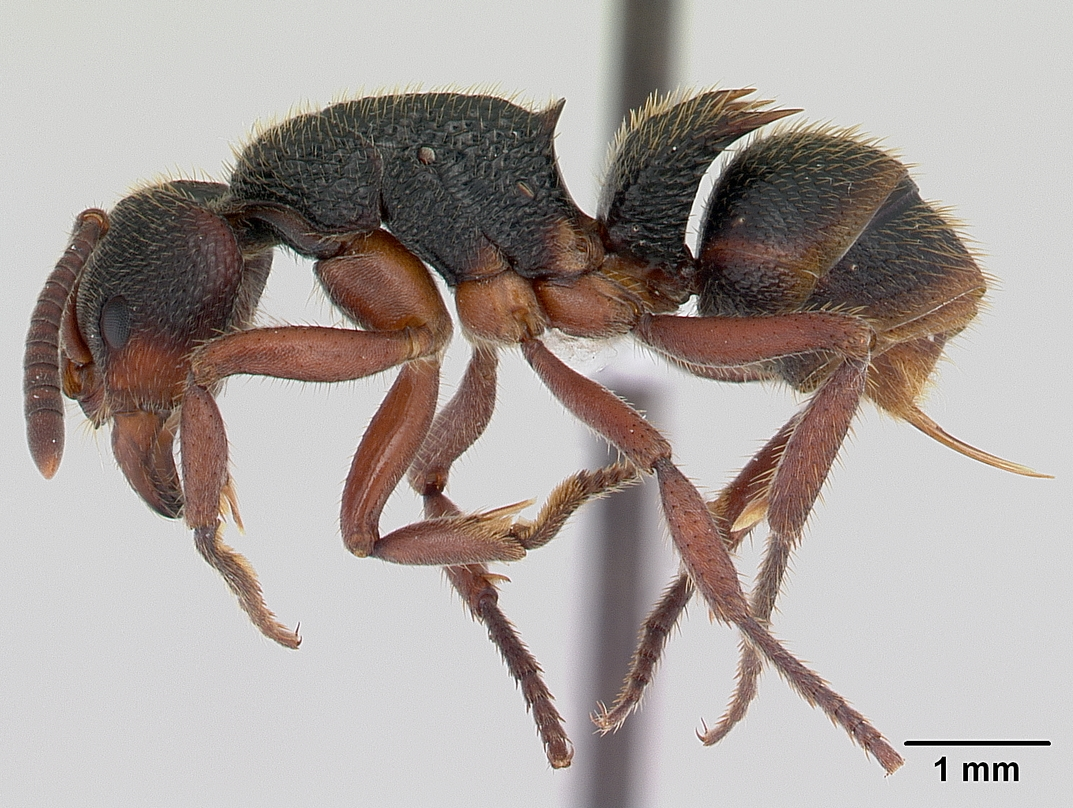
- Phrynoponera gabonensis worker

Scientific classification
- Domain: Eukaryota
- Kingdom: Animalia
- Phylum: Arthropoda
- Class: Insecta
- Order: Hymenoptera
- Family: Formicidae
- Genus: Phrynoponera
- Species: P. gabonensis

Binomial name
- Phrynoponera gabonensis (André, 1892)

= Phrynoponera gabonensis =

Species of ant

Phrynoponera gabonensis is an Afrotropical species of ant in the subfamily Ponerinae. P. gabonensis is the most common, widely distributed and frequently encountered member of the genus Phrynoponera. Specimens are usually retrieved from leaf litter samples but also occur in pitfall traps. The species is known to nest in and under rotten wood, in compacted soil and in termitaries.

== Synonyms ==
- Phrynoponera gabonensis var. striatidens (Santschi, 1914)
- Phrynoponera armata (Santschi, 1919)
- Phrynoponera gabonensis var. robustior (Santschi, 1919)
- Phrynoponera gabonensis var. esta Wheeler, 1922
- Phrynoponera gabonensis var. fecunda Wheeler, 1922
- Phrynoponera gabonensis var. umbrosa Wheeler, 1922
- Phrynoponera heterodus Wheeler, 1922
