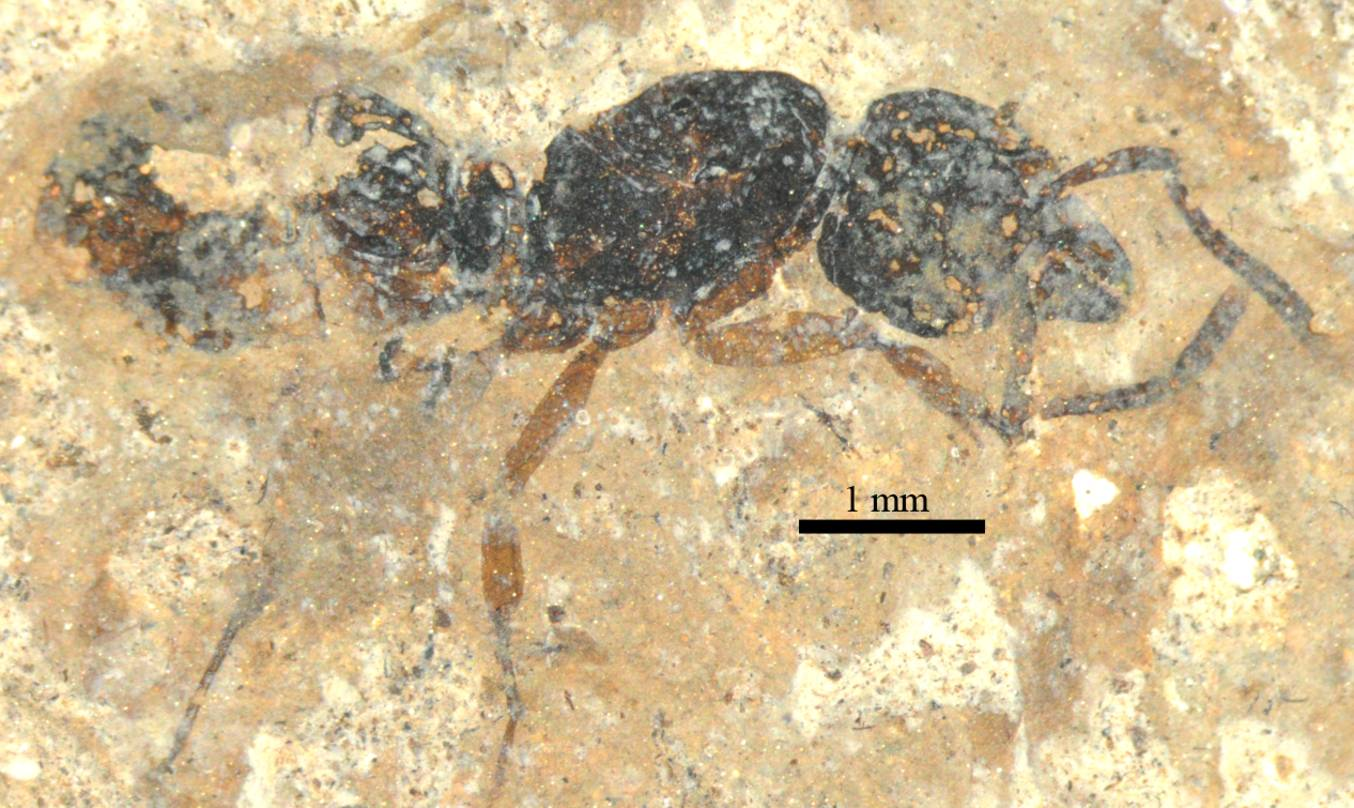
- P. parvula holotype

Scientific classification
- Kingdom: Animalia
- Phylum: Arthropoda
- Clade: Pancrustacea
- Class: Insecta
- Order: Hymenoptera
- Family: Formicidae
- Genus: Pachycondyla
- Species: †P. parvula

Binomial name
- †Pachycondyla parvula Dlussky, Rasnitsyn, & Perfilieva, 2015

Synonyms
- P. minuta Dlussky & Wedmann, 2012

= Pachycondyla parvula =

Pachycondyla parvula Temporal range: Lutetian

Extinct species of ant

Pachycondyla parvula is an extinct species of ant in the formicid subfamily Ponerinae described from a fossil found in Europe. P. parvula is one of six Lutetian Pachycondyla species.

== History and classification ==
When described Pachycondyla parvula was known from six fossil insects which are compression-impression fossils preserved in layers of soft sedimentary rock. Along with other well preserved insect fossils, the P. parvula specimens were collected from layers of Lutetian Messel Formation rock in the Messel pit World Heritage Site. The Messel formation is composed of brown coals, oil shales, and bituminous shale, which preserved numerous insects, fish, birds, reptiles, and terrestrial mammals as a notable lagerstätten. The area is a preserved maar lake which initially formed approximately 47 million years ago as the result of volcanic explosions.

At the time of description, the holotype specimen, number SMF MeI 10638, along with the paratype and four additional ants were preserved in the Senckenberg Research Station Messel fossil collections. The fossils were described by Gennady Dlussky and Sonja Wedmann in a 2012 paper on the poneromorph ants of Messel. In the type description Dlussky and Wedmann named the species P. minuta, with the specific epithet chosen in recognition of small size of the adults. However the combination Pachycondyla minuta had already been used by W. MacKay and E. MacKay in 2010 for a living ant species from Mexico, now named Rasopone minuta. Due to P. minuta being a junior homonym, a new name combination, Pachycondyla parvula was proposed for the species in a 2015 paper, with the species name "parvula" coming from the Latin for small or tiny.

The species is one of six Pachycondyla which have been described from Messel Formation fossils. All six of the species were described by Dlussky and Wedmann in the same 2012 paper, the other five being P. eocenica, P. lutzi, P.? messeliana, P. petiolosa, and P. petrosa. Another eight fossil species have been described from fossils in North America, Europe, and Asia.

== Description ==
The small Pachycondyla parvula queen has a body length of approximately 6–7.3 mm (0.24–0.29 in) and the head is 0.8–1.3 mm (0.031–0.051 in), while the alitrunk is 1.6–2.1 mm (0.063–0.083 in). The antennae scape extends towards the rear margin of the head but does not extend past it. The eyes are noted to be rather small and placed slightly forward of the heads midpoint. Where preserved the mandibles are subtriangular in outline had each has seven teeth. The petiole is rounded in side view, with a high, thick scale.
