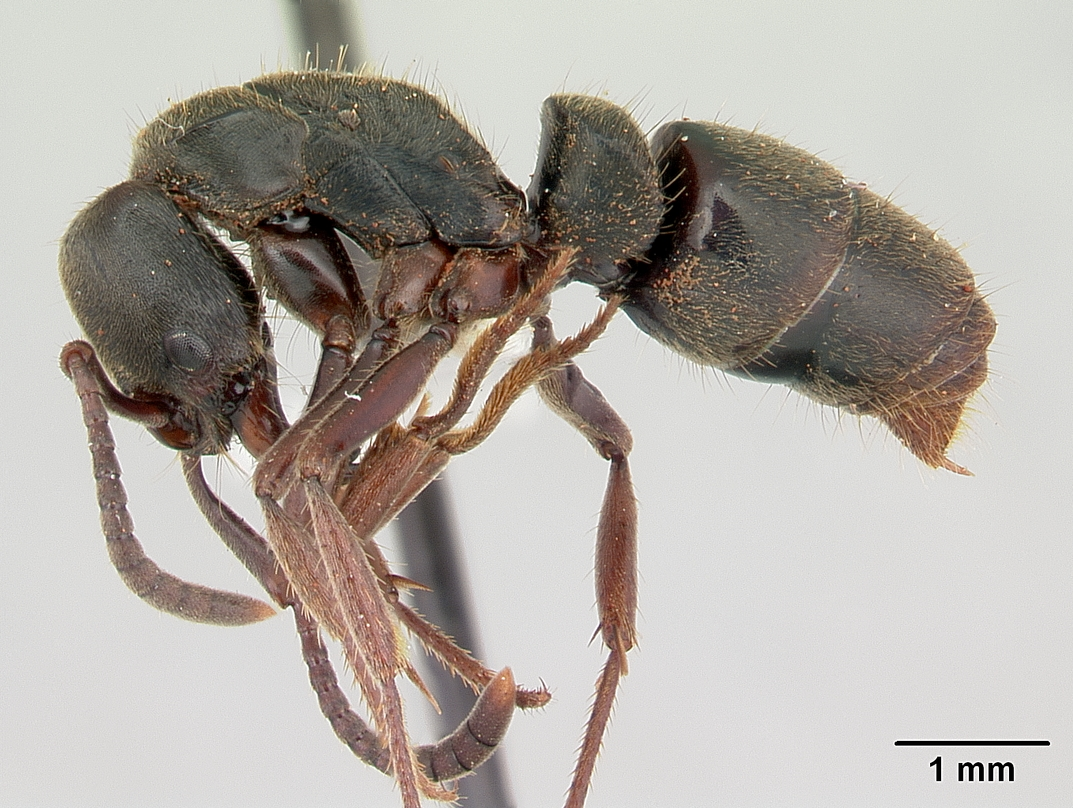
- Pachycondyla harpax worker

Scientific classification
- Kingdom: Animalia
- Phylum: Arthropoda
- Class: Insecta
- Order: Hymenoptera
- Family: Formicidae
- Subfamily: Ponerinae
- Tribe: Ponerini
- Alliance: Pachycondyla genus group
- Genus: Pachycondyla; Smith, 1858

Type species
- Formica crassinoda Latreille, 1802

Diversity
- 37 species

= Pachycondyla =

Pachycondyla Temporal range: Lutetian-Present

Genus of ants

Pachycondyla is a ponerine genus of ants found in the Neotropics.

== Distribution ==
Pachycondyla is currently distributed from southern United States to northern Argentina, but some fossil species (e.g. P. eocenica and P. lutzi) are found in Europe.

== Species ==
The genus formerly contained hundreds of species, most of them belonging to at the time junior synonyms of Pachycondyla. While revising the ponerines, Schmidt & Shattuck (2014) revived many of the former synonyms, leaving only eleven species in Pachycondyla. They were not able to place some species with certainty, and left more than twenty species incertae sedis in Pachycondyla, acknowledging that "this placement is undoubtedly incorrect".

- Pachycondyla beneditoi Marcineiro & Lattke, 2024
- Pachycondyla constricticeps Mackay & Mackay, 2010
- Pachycondyla crassinoda (Latreille, 1802)
- Pachycondyla fuscoatra (Roger, 1861)
- Pachycondyla harpax (Fabricius, 1804)
- Pachycondyla impressa (Roger, 1861)
- Pachycondyla inca Emery, 1901
- Pachycondyla lattkei Mackay & Mackay, 2010
- Pachycondyla lenis Kempf, 1961
- Pachycondyla lenkoi Kempf, 1962
- Pachycondyla procidua Emery, 1890
- Pachycondyla purpurascens Forel, 1899
- Pachycondyla striata Smith, F., 1858

=== incertae sedis ===
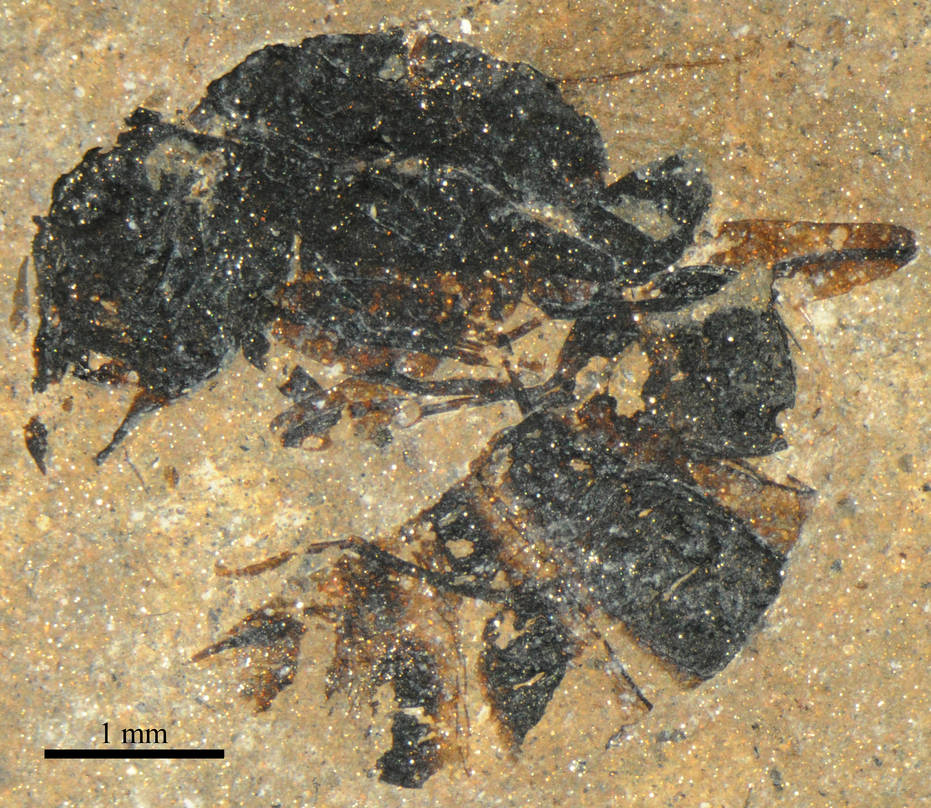
P. eocenica holotype

- Pachycondyla vieirai Mackay & Mackay, 2010
- †Pachycondyla aberrans Dlussky, Rasnitsyn, & Perfilieva, 2015
- †Pachycondyla baltica Dlussky, 2002
- †Pachycondyla calcarea (Théobald, 1937)
- †Pachycondyla conservata Dlussky, 2009
- †Pachycondyla dubia (Théobald, 1937)
- †Pachycondyla eocenica Dlussky & Wedmann, 2012
- †Pachycondyla globiventris (Théobald, 1937)
- †Pachycondyla gracilicornis (Mayr, 1868)
- †Pachycondyla labandeirai (Dlussky & Rasnitsyn, 2002)
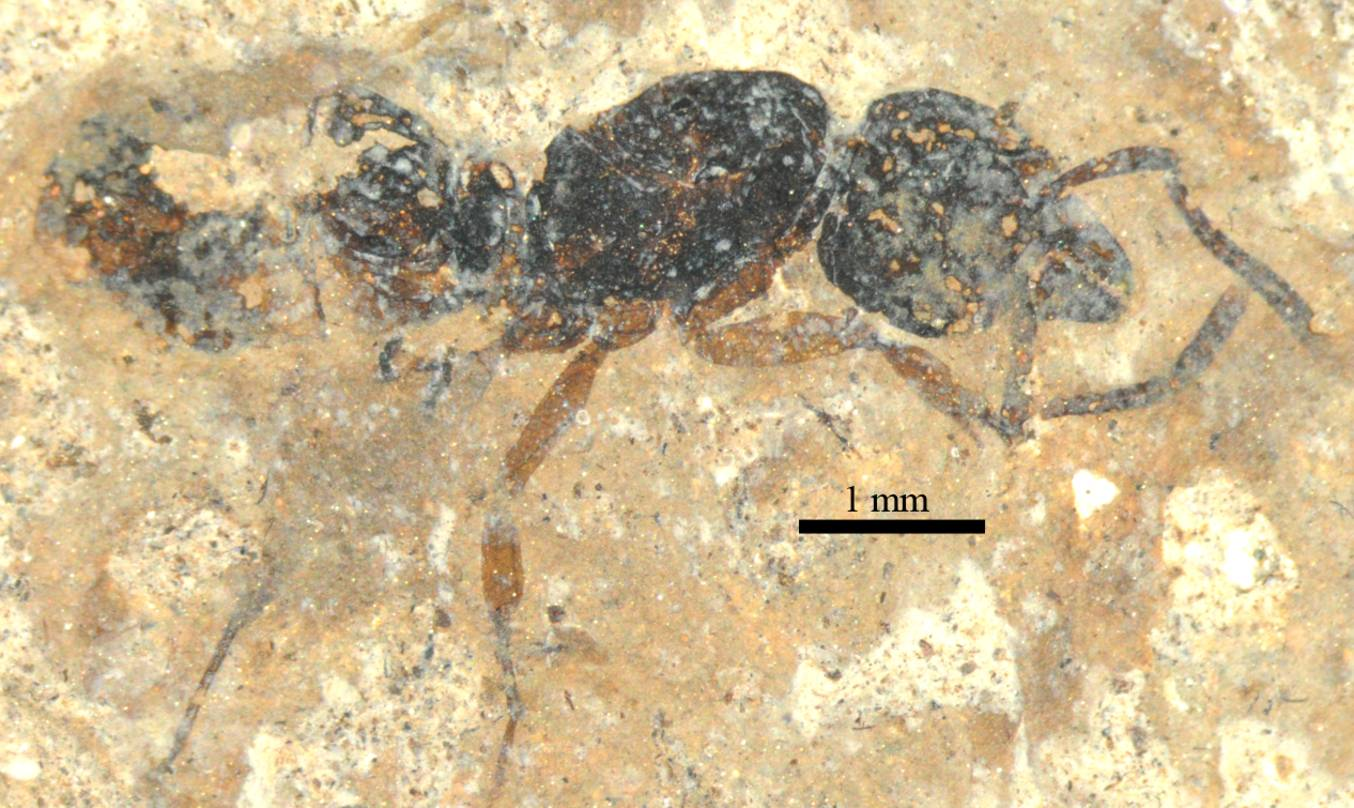
  P. parvula holotype
- †Pachycondyla lutzi Dlussky & Wedmann, 2012
- †Pachycondyla messeliana Dlussky & Wedmann, 2012
- †Pachycondyla minutansata (Zhang, 1989)
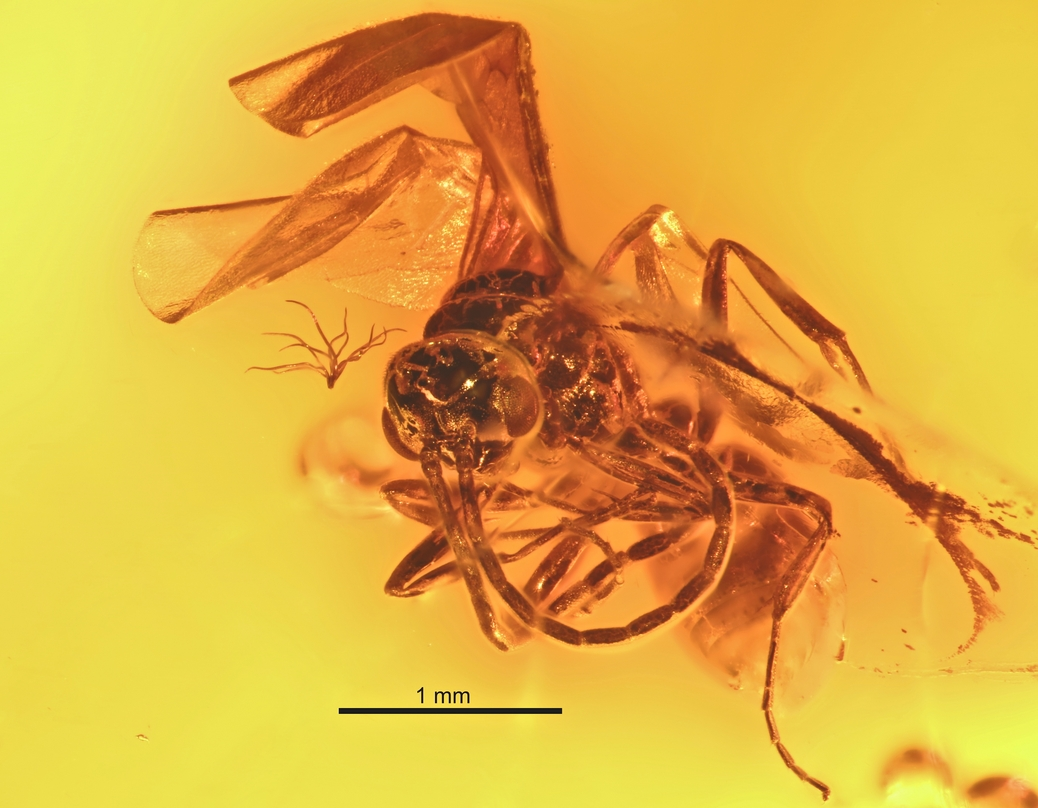
  Pachycondyla succinea male
- †Pachycondyla nubeculata (Zhang, 1989)
- †Pachycondyla oligocenica Dlussky, Rasnitsyn, & Perfilieva, 2015
- †Pachycondyla parvula Dlussky, Rasnitsyn, & Perfilieva, 2015
- †Pachycondyla petiolosa Dlussky & Wedmann, 2012
- †Pachycondyla petrosa Dlussky & Wedmann, 2012
- †Pachycondyla tristis (Dlussky, 2009)
