= Paleofauna of the Messel Formation =

This is an overview of the paleofauna of the Eocene Messel Formation as explored by the Messel Pit excavations in Germany. A former quarry and current UNESCO World Heritage Site, the Messel Formation preserves what lived in and around a meromictic lake surrounded by a paratropical rainforest during the latest early to earliest middle Eocene, approximately 47 Ma. A complete list of animal taxa was published in 2024.

== Sponges ==
Family	Genus	Species	Authority	Notes	Image
Spongillidae	†Ephydatia	Ephydatia gutenbergiana	Müller et al. 1982	A possibly rheophile species sponge, it grew dominant under favorable conditions and gradually replaced the native population of Lutetiospongilla until a change to the environment. Decrease in freshwater supply likely diminished the sponges population.	Ephydatia gutenbergiana gemmule
†Palaeospongillidae	†Lutetiospongilla	†Lutetiospongilla heili	Richter & Wuttke 1999	A permanent resident of the Messel lake, L. heili was already present when Ephydatia arrived in the lake and differed from the other species by possibly being rheophobe. Following the later species decline, Lutetiospongilla became the second "mass species" of the lake.	Lutetiospongilla heili Holotype gemmules and large radial gemmuloscleres
	"Type 3"			An unnamed sponge, informally referred to as "Type 3" by Heil (1964). It may have colonized Messel lake after Lutetiospongilla had replaced Ephydatia as the dominant sponge species.	

== Molluscs ==
Family	Genus	Species	Authority	Notes	Image
Viviparidae	Viviparus	Undescribed		A freshwater snail found in certain layers of the Messel formation.	

== Crustaceans ==
Family	Genus	Species	Authority	Notes	Image
Daphniidae	Ctenodaphnia	Undescribed		A water flea present in the oldest Messel formation stata Considered almost identical to the modern Ctenodaphnia magna.	
Daphniidae	Daphnia	Unidentified		A Daphnia subgenus Daphnia water flea First thought to have had single egged ephippia, but this was later proven to be false. Notably similar to the living Daphnia pulex.	
Moinidae	Moina	Undescribed		A water flea reported by Lutz from ephippia containing two eggs. They resemble the living Moina macrocopa.	
? Palaemonidae	†Bechleja	†Bechleja brevirostris	de Mazancourt, Wappler & Wedmann, 2022	A palaemonid? freshwater shrimp known from exceptionally preserved remains.	Bechleja brevirostri
? Palaemonidae	†Bechleja	†Bechleja sp.		A palaemonid? freshwater shrimp A single fossil with a longer upcurved rostrum than B. brevirostris not named pending more fossils found.	
incertae sedis	incertae sedis	incertae sedis		An undescribed freshwater shrimp discovered in 2005.	

== Arachnids ==
=== Araneae ===
Family	Genus	Species	Authority	Notes	Image
Araneidae	Undescribed	Undescribed		An orb-weaver spider first mentioned by Wunderlich (1986).	
?Cybaeidae	†Lutetiana	†Lutetiana neli	Selden & Wappler, 2019	A possible cybaeid ground spider A Marronoidea based on leg length and claws The first described Messel arachnid.	Lutetiana neli holotype
Hersiliidae	Undescribed	Undescribed		A well preserved tree trunk spider.	

=== Opiliones ===
Family	Genus	Species	Authority	Notes	Image
Undescribed	Undescribed	Undescribed		Six harvestmen awaiting description.	

== Insects ==
=== Coleoptera ===
Family	Genus	Species	Authority	Notes	Image
Attelabidae	†Palaeoalatorostrum	†Palaeoalatorostrum schaali	Rheinheimer, 2007	An Attelabine leaf-rolling weevil	
Cupedidae	Cupes	†Cupes messelensis	(Tröster, 1993)	A reticulated beetle species	
Cupedidae	Cupes	†Cupes nabozhenkoi	Kirejtshuk, 2020	A reticulated beetle species	Cupes nabozhenkoi holotype
Cupedidae	Cupes	†Cupes wedmannae	Kirejtshuk, 2020	A reticulated beetle species	Cupes wedmannae holotype
Curculionidae	†Palaeocrassirhinus	†Palaeocrassirhinus messelensis	Rheinheimer, 2007	A Brachyderine weevil	
Curculionidae	†Palaeocrassirhinus	†Palaeocrassirhinus rugosithorax	Rheinheimer, 2007	A Brachyderine weevil	
Curculionidae	†Palaeocneorhinus	†Palaeocneorhinus messelensis	Rheinheimer, 2007	A Brachyderine weevil	
Elateridae	†Macropunctum	†Macropunctum angulosum	Tröster, 1999	A click beetle species.	
Elateridae	†Macropunctum	†Macropunctum angustiscutellurn	Tröster, 1994	A click beetle species.	
Elateridae	†Macropunctum	†Macropuncturn latiscutellurn	Tröster, 1994	A click beetle species.	
Elateridae	†Macropunctum	†Macropunctum messelense	Tröster, 1994	A click beetle species.	
Elateridae	†Macropunctum	†Macropunctum minuturn	(Meunier, 1921)	A click beetle species.	
Elateridae	†Macropunctum	†Macropunctum rebugense	Tröster, 1994	A click beetle species.	
Elateridae	†Macropunctum	†Macropunctum senckenbergi	Tröster, 1994	A click beetle species.	
Lucanidae	Protognathinus	†Protognathinus spielbergi	Chalumeau et al. 2001	A 55 mm (2.2 in) long stag beetle with preserved coloration.	
Psephenidae	Unnamed	Unnamed		A eubrianacine water-penny beetle Known from larval remains.	
Tenebrionidae	Ceropria?	Ceropria? messelense	Hornschemeyer, 1994	A tenebrionine darkling beetle	

=== Dictyopterans ===
Family	Genus	Species	Authority	Notes	Image
Blaberidae	Morphna	†Morphna cenozoica	Šmídová, Vidlička & Wedmann, 2021	A Blaberid giant cockroach.	

=== Dipterans ===
Family	Genus	Species	Authority	Notes	Image
Bibionidae	Plecia	†Plecia acourti †Plecia hoffeinsorum Unnamed species	Cockerell, 1921 Skartveit, 2009	Several species of march fly.	
Bombyliidae	Comptosia	†Comptosia pria	Wedmann & Yeates, 2008	A species of bee fly.	
Chaoboridae	Chaoborus	Unnamed		Unnamed midges known from aquatic larval form.	
Nemestrinidae	Hirmoneura	†Hirmoneura messelense	Wedmann et al., 2021	A pollen feeding species of tangle-veined fly.	

=== Hemiptera ===
Family	Genus	Species	Authority	Notes	Image
Aradidae	Aneurus?	Aneurus? incertus	Wappler, Heiss & Wedmann, 2015	A species of flat bug.	
Aradidae	Mezira	Mezira parapetrificata Mezira petrificata	Wappler, Heiss & Wedmann, 2015	Two species of flat bug.	
Dictyopharidae	Wedelphus	Wedelphus dichopteroides	Szwedo & Wappler, 2006	A dictyopharid planthopper	
Eurybrachidae	Amalaberga	Amalaberga ostrogothiorum	Szwedo & Wappler, 2006	A eurybrachid planthopper	
Lophopidae	Baninus	Baninus thuringiorum	Szwedo & Wappler, 2006	A lophopid planthopper	
Pentatomidae	Eospinosus	Eospinosus peterkulkai	Wedmann et al., 2021	A species of shield bug exhibiting prominent spiky protrustions possibly used in defense or camouflage.	
Tingidae	Chorotingiotes	Chorotingiotes prisca	Wappler, 2003	A ypsotingine tingine lacebug	
Tingidae	Exmesselensis	Exmesselensis disspinosus	Wappler, 2003	A phatnomine canatacaderine lacebug	
Tingidae	Lutetiacader	Lutetiacadeir petrefactus	Wappler, 2006	A cantacaderine canatacaderine lacebug	
Tingidae	Oblongomorpha	Oblongomorpha lutetia	Wappler, 2003	A litadeine tingine lacebug	

=== Hymenoptera ===
Family	Genus	Species	Authority	Notes	Image
Apidae	†Pygomelissa	†Pygomelissa lutetia	Wappler & Engel, 2003	A bee of uncertain tribal placement.	
Apidae	†Protobombus	†Protobombus messelensis	Wappler & Engel, 2003	An electrapinae bee.	
Formicidae	†Archimyrmex	†Archimyrmex wedmannae	Dlussky, 2012	A myrmeciine ant with long mandibles.	Archimyrmex wedmannae holotype
Formicidae	†Casaleia	†Casaleia eocenica	Dlussky & Wedmann, 2012	An amblyoponine ant.	Casaleia eocenica holotype
Formicidae	†Cephalopone	†Cephalopone grandis	Dlussky & Wedmann, 2012	A ponerine Poneromorph ant	Cephalopone grandis holotype
Formicidae	†Cephalopone	†Cephalopone potens	Dlussky & Wedmann, 2012	A ponerine Poneromorph ant	Cephalopone potens holotype
Formicidae	†Cyrtopone	†Cyrtopone curiosa	Dlussky & Wedmann, 2012	A ponerine ant	
Formicidae	†Cyrtopone	†Cyrtopone elongata	Dlussky & Wedmann, 2012	A ponerine ant	
Formicidae	†Cyrtopone	†Cyrtopone microcephala	Dlussky & Wedmann, 2012	A ponerine ant	
Formicidae	†Cyrtopone	†Cyrtopone striata	Dlussky & Wedmann, 2012	A ponerine ant	Cyrtopone striata holotype
Formicidae	Gesomyrmex	Gesomyrmex pulcher	Dlussky, Wappler, & Wedmann, 2009	A formicine subfamily ant	Gesomyrmex pulcher holotype
Formicidae	†Messelepone	†Messelepone leptogenoides	Dlussky & Wedmann, 2012	A poneromorph ant.	Messelepone leptogenoides holotype
Formicidae	Pachycondyla	†Pachycondyla eocenica	Dlussky & Wedmann, 2012	A ponerine ant	
Formicidae	Pachycondyla	†Pachycondyla lutzi	Dlussky & Wedmann, 2012	A ponerine ant	Pachycondyla lutzi holotype
Formicidae	Pachycondyla	†Pachycondyla? messeliana	Dlussky & Wedmann, 2012	A ponerine ant	
Formicidae	Pachycondyla	†Pachycondyla parvula	Dlussky et al., 2015	A ponerine ant	
Formicidae	Pachycondyla	†Pachycondyla petiolosa	Dlussky & Wedmann, 2012	A ponerine ant	
Formicidae	Pachycondyla	†Pachycondyla petrosa	Dlussky & Wedmann, 2012	A ponerine ant	
Formicidae	†Protopone	†Protopone? dubia	Dlussky & Wedmann, 2012	A ponerine ant	
Formicidae	†Protopone	†Protopone germanica	Dlussky & Wedmann, 2012	A ponerine ant	
Formicidae	†Protopone	†Protopone magna	Dlussky & Wedmann, 2012	A ponerine ant	Protopone magna holotype
Formicidae	†Protopone	†Protopone oculata	Dlussky & Wedmann, 2012	A ponerine ant	
Formicidae	†Protopone	†Protopone sepulta	Dlussky & Wedmann, 2012	A ponerine ant	
Formicidae	†Protopone	†Protopone vetula	Dlussky & Wedmann, 2012	A ponerine ant	
Formicidae	†Pseudectatomma	†Pseudectatomma eocenica	Dlussky & Wedmann, 2012	An ectatommine ant	Pseudectatomma eocenica holotype
Formicidae	†Pseudectatomma	†Pseudectatomma striatula	Dlussky & Wedmann, 2012	An ectatommine ant	
Formicidae	†Titanomyrma	†Titanomyrma gigantea	(Lutz, 1986)	A formiciine subfamily ant	Titanomyrma simillima holotype
Formicidae	†Titanomyrma	†Titanomyrma simillima	(Lutz, 1986)	A formiciine subfamily ant	Titanomyrma simillima holotype
Ichneumonidae	†Mesornatus	†Mesornatus markovici	Spasojevic, Wedmann & Klopfstein, 2018	An ichneumon wasp of uncertain subfamilial affinity	Mesornatus markovici holotype
Ichneumonidae	†Polyhelictes	†Polyhelictes bipolarus	Spasojevic, Wedmann & Klopfstein, 2018	An ichneumon wasp of uncertain subfamilial affinity	Polyhelictes bipolarus holotype
Ichneumonidae	Rhyssella	†Rhyssella vera	Spasojevic, Wedmann & Klopfstein, 2018	A rhyssine ichneumon wasp	Rhyssella vera holotype
Ichneumonidae	Scambus	†Scambus fossilobus	Spasojevic, Wedmann & Klopfstein, 2018	An ephialtine pimplinae ichneumon wasp	Scambus fossilobus holotype
Ichneumonidae	†Trigonator	†Trigonator macrocheirus	Spasojevic, Wedmann & Klopfstein, 2018	A labenine ichneumon wasp	Trigonator macrocheirus holotype
Ichneumonidae	Xanthopimpla	†Xanthopimpla messelensis	Spasojevic, Wedmann & Klopfstein, 2018	A pimpline pimplinae ichneumon wasp	Xanthopimpla messelensis holotype
Ichneumonidae	Xanthopimpla	†Xanthopimpla praeclara	Spasojevic, Wedmann & Klopfstein, 2018	A pimpline pimplinae ichneumon wasp	Xanthopimpla praeclara holotype
Siricidae	Xoanon?	†Xoanon? eocenicus	Wedmann, Pouillon, & Nel, 2014	A siricid horntail wasp Uncertainly placed into Xoanon	
Vespidae	Vespula?	†Vespula? hassiaca	Abels & Wedmann, 2021	A vespid wasp Tentatively placed with the yellowjackets	

=== Lepidoptera ===
Family	Genus	Species	Authority	Notes	Image
?Zygaenidae	undescribed	undescribed		Two undescribed moth taxa Possibly belonging to Zygaenidae wings scales with preserved structural coloration	Undescribed moth

=== Neuroptera ===
Family	Genus	Species	Authority	Notes	Image
Mantispidae	†Symphrasites	†Symphrasites eocenicus	Wedman & Makarkin, 2007	A symphrasine mantidfly Described from an isolated forewing	

=== Odonata ===
Family	Genus	Species	Authority	Notes	Image
†Dysagrionidae	†Petrolestes	†Petrolestes messelensis	Garrouste & Nel, 2015	A damselfly Related to the North American P. hendersoni.	
†Pseudostenolestidae	†Pseudostenolestes	†Pseudostenolestes bechlyi	Garrouste & Nel, 2015	A damselfly species.	

=== Orthoptera ===
Family	Genus	Species	Authority	Notes	Image
Tetrigidae	†Archaeoarmatus	†Archaeoarmatus messelensis	Kasalo et al. (2024)	A batrachideine pygmy grasshopper.	
Tetrigidae	†Messeltettix	†Messeltettix cryptoantennatus	Kasalo et al. (2024)	A batrachideine pygmy grasshopper.	

=== Phasmatodea ===
Family	Genus	Species	Authority	Notes	Image
Phasmatodea	†Eophyllium	†Eophyllium messelensis	Wedmann, Bradler & Rust, 2007	A Phylliidae leaf insect, The camouflage adaptions of modern Phylliids were already present in E. messelensis.	

== Fish ==
=== Amiiformes ===
Family	Genus	Species	Authority	Notes	Image
Amiidae	†Cyclurus	†Cyclurus kehreri	(Andreae, 1893)	An amiine bowfin relative	Cyclurus kehreri

=== Anguilliformes ===
Family	Genus	Species	Authority	Notes	Image
Anguillidae	Anguilla	†Anguilla ignota	Micklich, 1985	Anguilla ignota fossils suggest a likely aquatic link to an ocean.	

=== Lepisosteiformes ===
Family	Genus	Species	Authority	Notes	Image
Lepisosteidae	Atractosteus	Atractosteus messelensis	Grande, 2010	One of three Messel gar species.	
Lepisosteidae	Atractosteus	†Atractosteus strausi	(Kinkelin, 1884)	One of three Messel gar species.	
Lepisosteidae	†Masillosteus	†Masillosteus kelleri	Micklich & Klappert, 2001	A rare, blunt snouted gar that likely fed on small invertebrates. It may not have been a permanent resident of the Messel lake.	

=== Perciformes ===
Family	Genus	Species	Authority	Notes	Image
Moronidae	Palaeoperca	Palaeoperca proxima	Micklich, 1978	Palaeoperca may have been open water fish.	
Percichthydae	Amphiperca	Amphiperca multiformis	Weitzel, 1933	Amphiperca likely was a thrust or ambush hunter catching prey from near-shore hiding spots.	
incertae sedis	Rhenanoperca	Rhenanoperca minuta	Gaudant & Micklich, 1990	A small perciform with teeth suited for a durophagous diet. Fossils show they at least occasionally fed on smaller members of their species.	

=== Thaumaturidae ===
Family	Genus	Species	Authority	Notes	Image
Thaumaturidae	Thaumaturus	Thaumaturus intermedius	Weitzel, 1933	Thaumaturus is only known from juvenile specimens, ranging in length from 3–6 cm (1.2–2.4 in). Its relationship with other groups of fish remains unknown.	

== Amphibians ==
=== Caudata ===
Family	Genus	Species	Authority	Notes	Image
Salamandridae	Chelotriton	Chelotriton robustus	Westphal, 1980	A newt, possibly related to ribbed newts and crocodile newts.	
Salamandridae	Chelotriton	Chelotriton sp.	Undescribed	A newt, possibly related to ribbed newts and crocodile newts.	

=== Anura ===
Family	Genus	Species	Authority	Notes	Image
Palaeobatrachidae	"Messelobatrachus"	"Messelobatrachus tobieni"	Nomen nudum	Messelobatrachus and M. tobieni were first coined in a 1988 PhD. dissertation, but never formally published. One fossil preserves a possible tadpole of "Messelobatrachus".	
Pelobatidae	Eopelobates	Eopelobates wagneri	Weitzel, 1938	A spadefoot toad relative It was likely primarily terrestrial and entered the lake to spawn, as shown by preserved eggs.	
Pipidae	Undescribed	Undescribed		Two undescribed specimens of Xenopinae clawed frogs.	
Incertae sedis	Lutetiobatrachus	Lutetiobatrachus gracilis	Wuttke, 1998	First coined in 1988, but nomen nudum until redescription in 2012.	

== Squamata ==
Clade	Genus	Species	Authority	Notes	Image
Anguidae	Ophisauriscus	Ophisauriscus quadrupes	Kuhn, 1940	A serpentine reptile with vestigial limbs. It shows evidence of different osteoderm morphology after tail regeneration.	
Anguidae	Placosauriops	"Placosauriops abderhaldeni"	Kuhn, 1940	A type of melanosaurinin Glyptosaurine of dubious assignment, as the type material has not been adequately diagnosed.	
Boidae	Eoconstrictor	Eoconstrictor fischeri	(Schaal, 2004)	An early species of boa previously known as Palaeopython fischeri.	
Boidae	Messelophis	Messelophis variatus	Baszio, 2004	A minute boa	
Boidae	Rieppelophis	Rieppelophis ermannorum	(Schaal & Baszio, 2004)	A minute boa previously regarded as a species of Messelophis.	
Corytophanidae	Geiseltaliellus	Geiseltaliellus maarius	Smith, 2009	An extinct, possibly arboreal, relative of the modern basilisk lizard.	
Eolacertidae	Eolacerta	Eolacerta robusta	Nöth, 1940	A large species of lizard, reaching a length of 30 cm (12 in) and a weight of 1 kg (2.2 lb).	
Eolacertidae	Stefanikia	Stefanikia siderea	Čerňanský & Smith, 2017	A close relative of Eolacerta, the two genera were recovered as a sister-group to modern lizards.	
Erycinae	Rageryx	Rageryx schmidi	Smith & Scanferla, 2021	A non-burrowing sandboa that reached a length of 52 cm (20 in).	
Cf. Lacertidae	Undescribed	Undescribed		An undescribed arboreal lizard relative.	
Gekkota	Undescribed	Undescribed		A partly disarticulated skeleton of a gekko	
Helodermatidae	Eurheloderma	Eurheloderma sp.		A relative of the extant gila monster, it was likely already venomous.	
Lacertibaenia	Cryptolacerta	Crytolacerta hassiaca	Müller et al., 2011	Phylogenetic analysis indicates that it may be a close relative of the limbless Amphisbaenia. Only two specimens are known, one of which was found in the stomach of the varanoid Paranecrosaurus	
Messelopythonidae	Messelopython	Messelopython freyi	Zaher & Smith, 2020	A medium sized pythonoid.	
Messelopythonidae	Palaeopython	Palaeopython schaali	Smith & Scanferla, 2022	A pythonoid snake of similar size to Eoconstrictor. Several traits of the skull suggest it may have been arboreal.	
Palaeovaranidae	Palaeovaranus	Palaeovaranus sp.		Identified as Necrosaurus by Smith, Čerňanský and Scanferla, it is smaller than Paranecrosaurus.	
Palaeovaranidae	Paranecrosaurus	Paranecrosaurus feisti	(Stritzke, 1983)	First described as "Saniwa" feisti, it was found with the skull of Cryptolacerta in its guts. This indicates that this varanoid was at least partly carnivorous.	
Pan-Shinisaurus	Pan Shinisaurus indet.	Pan Shinisaurus indet.		The shed tail of a crocodile lizard, showing adaptation for swimming.	
Polychrotidae	Undescribed	Undescribed		A possible relative of the modern bush anole.	
Scincidae	Scincidae indet.	Scincidae indet.			
Scincoidea	Ornatocephalus	Ornatocephalus metzleri	Weber, 2004	An arboreal lizard with long claws and a prehensile tail, it was found with plants remains in its guts.	

== Testudinata ==
Family	Genus	Species	Authority	Notes	Image
Carettochelyidae	Allaeochelys	Allaeochelys crassesculptata	(Harrassowitz, 1922)	A relative of the modern pig-nosed turtle, one fossil preserves two specimens while mating.	
Geoemydidae	Euroemys	Euroemys kehreri	Staesche, 1928	A species of pond turtles of uncertain relationship, it was previously thought to be a species of Ocadia and Palaeoemys.	
Geoemydidae	Francellia	Francellia messeliana	Staesche, 1928	A species of pond turtles of uncertain relationship, it was previously thought to be a species of Ocadia and Palaeoemys.	
Geoemydidae	Juvemys	Juvemys sp.	Hervet, 2003	A species of pond turtles.	
Podocnemididae	Neochelys	Neochelys franzeni	Schleich, 1993	A podocnemidid side-necked turtle	
Trionychidae	Palaeoamyda	Palaeoamyda messeliana	(Reinach, 1900)	A species of softshell turtle	

== Crocodyliformes ==
Family	Genus	Species	Authority	Notes	Image
Alligatoroidea	Diplocynodon	Diplocynodon darwini Diplocynodon deponaie	(Ludvig, 1877) (Frey, Laemmert & Riess, 1987)	The two species can be differentiated by the presence of well-developed osteoderms on the tail of Diplocynodon deponaie.	
Alligatoridae	Hassiacosuchus	Hassiacosuchus haupti	Weitzel, 1935	A small species of alligatorid, some consider it a species of Allognathosuchus. Christopher Brochu argues for the continued use of Hassiacosuchus however.	
Bergisuchidae	Bergisuchus	Bergisuchus dietrichbergi	Kuhn, 1968	Member of the terrestrial Sebecosuchians with ziphodont teeth.	
Crocodyloidea	"Asiatosuchus"	"Asiatosuchus" germanicus	Berg, 1966	A large and well known species of the paraphyletic genus Asiatosuchus.	
Planocraniidae	Boverisuchus	Boverisuchus magnifrons	Kuhn, 1938	A terrestrial Crocodilian previously assigned to the now dubious Pristichampsus	
Tomistominae	Tomistominae indet.	Tomistominae indet.			

== Birds ==
=== Palaeognathae ===
Family	Genus	Species	Authority	Notes	Image
Lithornithidae	Lithornis	Lithornis sp.		Its size was intermediate between Lithornis plebius and Lithornis hookeri. Additionally, it represents the last known lithornithid in the fossil record.	
Incertae sedis	Palaeotis	Palaeotis weigelti	Lambrecht, 1928	A flightless palaeognath, previous analysis considered it to be a relative to ostriches or rheas. More recent research however doubts this.	

=== Anseriformes ===
Family	Genus	Species	Authority	Notes	Image
Gastornithidae	Gastornis	Gastornis geiselensis	Fischer, 1978	A large, herbivorous galloansere.	

=== Galliformes ===
Clade	Genus	Species	Authority	Notes	Image
Gallinuloididae	Paraortygoides	Paraortygoides messelensis	Mayr, 2000	One of the earliest known galliforms, the lack of a crop indicates they fed on only soft plant material.	

=== Mirandornithes ===
Family	Genus	Species	Authority	Notes	Image
	Juncitarsus	Juncitarsus merkeli	Olson & Feduccia, 1980	A wading bird thought to be basal to both flamingos and grebes. Both the beak shape and the presence of gastroliths show that it was not yet adapted to filderfeed and instead fed on hard items.	

=== Cuculiformes ===
Family	Genus	Species	Authority	Notes	Image
Foratidae?	Unnamed	Unnamed		Known from an isolated skull similar to the larger Foro panarium.	

=== Strisores ===
Family	Genus	Species	Authority	Notes	Image
	Cypseloramphus	Cypseloramphus dimidius	Mayr, 2016	A tentative apodiform.	
Archaeotrogonidae	Hassiavis	Hassiavis laticauda	Mayr, 1998	The skull of Hassiavis closely resembles that of modern owlet-nightjars, being broad and short.	
	Masillapodargus	Masillapodargus longipes	Mayr, 2001	A relative of the modern frogmouths.	
Jungornithidae?	Parargornis	Parargornis messelensis	Mayr, 2003	A swift-like bird with short wings and long tail feathers, phylogenetic analysis indicate that it was a basal type of hummingbird.	
Nyctibiidae	Paraprefica	Paraprefica kelleri Paraprefica major	Mayr, 1999	An old-world genus of potoo. The two species can clearly be differentiated by size.	
	Protocypselomorphus	Protocypselomorphus manfredkelleri	Mayr, 2005	An aerial insectivore with reduced feet, it was recovered as a sister-taxon to all other Strisores.	
Pan-Apodidae	Scaniacypselus	Scaniacypselus szarskii	(Peters, 1985)	An early genus of swift, its reduced legs and less developed wings indicate that it wasn't as aerial as its modern relatives and likely nested in trees.	

=== Charadriiformes ===
Family	Genus	Species	Authority	Notes	Image
Jacanidae?	Vanolimicola	Vanolimicola longihallucis	Mayr, 2017	A small wading bird with elongated hallux. It is possibly a jacanid or a Songziidae rail-relative Gruiform.	

=== Gruimorphae ===
Family	Genus	Species	Authority	Notes	Image
Messelornithidae	Messelornis	Messelornis cristata	Hesse, 1988	The most common fossil bird found at Messel, it was likely a terrestrial animal capable of only short bursts of flight due to its short wings. It may have had a comb or crest atop its head.	

=== Suliformes ===
Family	Genus	Species	Authority	Notes	Image
Sulidae?	Masillastega	Masillastega rectirostris	Mayr, 2002	A bird tentatively referred to Sulidae, it was approximately the size of a modern European shag. It was likely piscivorous.	

=== Pelecaniformes ===
Family	Genus	Species	Authority	Notes	Image
Threskiornithidae	Rhynchaeites	Rhynchaeites messelensis	Wittich, 1898	Also known as the "snipe-rail" for its similarities to rails and painted snipes, it was actually a type of ibis.	

=== Strigiformes ===
Family	Genus	Species	Authority	Notes	Image
cf. Protostrigidae	Masillastrix	Masillastrix blattophaga	Mayr in Mayr et al., 2026	Single known specimen preserves an iridescent cockroach as gut contents	
Palaeoglaucidae	Palaeoglaux	Palaeoglaux artophoron	Peters, 1992	A small owl preserving ribbon-like feathers arranged in a dense layer on its back.	

=== Coraciimorphae ===
Family	Genus	Species	Authority	Notes	Image
Sandcoleidae	Chascacocolius	Chascacocolius cacicirostris	Mayr, 2005	A coliform bird with a conical beak.	
Eocoraciidae	Eocoracias	Eocoracias brachyptera	Mayr, 2000	An early species of roller, analysis of the plumage gave indication as to what its colours would have been in life.	
Sandcoleidae	Eoglaucidium	Eoglaucidium pallas Eoglaucidium sp. indet.	Mayr & Peters, 1998	Originally described as an owl from the Geiseltal, it was later found to be related to mousebirds. Its tail is notably shorter than that of its extant relatives. It is possible that the indetermined species instead belongs to Anneavis.	
Gracilitarsidae	Gracilitarsus	Gracilitarsus mirabilis	Mayr, 1998	The shape of the beak indicates that Gracilitarsus was either an insectivore or fed on nectar.	
Coliidae	Masillacolius	Masillacolius brevidactylus	Mayr & Peters, 1998	An extinct species of mousebird.	
Trogonidae	Masillatrogon	Masillatrogon pumilio	Mayr, 2009	An extinct species of trogon that supports the hypothesis that the family originated in the Old World.	
Messelirrisoridae	Messelirrisor	Messelirrisor grandis Messelirrisor halycrostris Messelirrisor parvus	Mayr, 2000 Mayr, 1998 Mayr, 1998	Relatives of the modern hoopoe and wood hoopoe, they were birds with long, pointed beaks and diminutive body size. The tail feathers of one specimen show they were barred, preserving a pattern of dark and light stripes.	
Leptosomidae?	Plesiocathartes	Plesiocathartes kelleri	Mayr, 2002	A possible relative of the modern cuckoo-roller.	
Primobucconidae	Primobucco	Primobucco frugilegus Primobucco perneri	Mayr, Mourer-Chaviré & Weidig, 2004	The first recorded species of Primobucco in Europe.	
Incertae sedis	Quasisyndactylus	Quasisyndactylus longibrachis	Mayr, 1998	Quasisyndactylus is thought to be a relative of modern kingfishers, todies and motmots.	
Coliidae	Selmes	Selmes absurdipes	Peters, 1999	A genus of mousebird.	

=== Cariamiformes (?) ===
Several groups of Messel birds share characteristics with the modern seriemas, which has led to them being placed within the clade Cariamae in the past. However, this placement typically occurred under the assumption that they are a group within gruiformes, which has been disputed by more recent analysis. Instead more recent publications consider Cariamae (or Cariamiformes) as basal members of Australaves.

Family	Genus	Species	Authority	Notes	Image
Idiornithidae	Dynamopterus	Dynamopterus cf. itardiensis Dynamopterus tuberculata	(Mourer-Chauviré, 1983) (Peters, 1995)	Previously known as Idiornis, it was later found to be synonymous with Dynamopterus.	Idiornis tuberculata
Salmilidae	Salmila	Salmila robusta	Mayr, 2000	Salmila was originally described as a part of Cariamae within Gruiformes, but later analysis suggested that it was a sister taxon to the group instead. It shares characteristics with both seriemas and trumpeter birds.	Salmila robusta
Ameghinornithidae	Strigogyps	Strigogyps sapea	(Peters, 1987)	Previously known as Aenigmavis, stomach contents indicate it was a herbivore. The phylogenetic position of Strigogyps is uncertain.	Strigogyps sapea

=== Falconiformes ===
Family	Genus	Species	Authority	Notes	Image
Masillaraptoridae	Masillaraptor	Masillaraptor parvunguis	Mayr, 2006	A long-legged, possibly more terrestrial bird. It shares several traits with modern falcons, but may be a more basal member of Falconiformes.	

=== Psittacopasserae ===
Family	Genus	Species	Authority	Notes	Image
Halcyornithidae	Halcyornithidae indet.	Halcyornithidae indet.		A poorly preserved halcyornithid of smaller size than Serudaptus. It may be a different species of the same genus, a juvenile, a member of the opposite sex or a unique genus.	
Halcyornithidae	Scopsoides	Scopsoides feisti	Mayr, 2025		
Halcyornithidae	Serudaptus	Serudaptus pohli	Mayr, 2000	A bird with zygodactyl feet and long claws suited for climbing. Its exact phylogenetic position is poorly understood, with some research indicating it may be a basal member of the clade containing Passeriformes and Psittaciformes.	
Messelasturidae	Messelastur	Messelastur gratulator	Peters, 1994	Messelastur is a bird with a poorly understood ecology. Although shown to be closely related to Tynsyka, its relationship to other groups is not fully understood. Older publications suggest it may have been related to parrots or various birds of prey (including owls, hawks and falcons). One recent publication positions them at the base of Psittacopasserae alongside the Halcyornithidae (=Pseudasturidae).	
Psittacopedidae	Psittacopes	Psittacopes lepidus	Mayr & Daniels, 1998	A bird originally classified as a parrot, later research indicated that it may instead be closer to passeriforms.	
Psittacopedidae	Pumiliornis	Pumiliornis tessellatus	Mayr, 1999	A bird the size of a small wren.	
Quercypsittidae?	Palaeopsittacus	Palaeopsittacus cf. georgei	Harrison, 1982	Although initially assigned to Psittaciformes, later research instead suggested the idea that it was a type of frogmouth instead.	
Zygodactylidae	Primozygodactylus	Primozygodactylus ballmanni Primozygodactylus danielsi Primozygodactylus eunjooae Primozygodactylus longibrachium Primozygodactylus mayor Primozygodactylus quintus	Mayr, 1998 Mayr, 1998 Mayr and Zelenkov, 2009 Mayr, 2016 Mayr, 1998	Zygodactyl birds originally thought to be relatives of woodpeckers, later research placed them as a sister group to the Passeriformes. Diet varies between species, with the type species likely being an insectivore while the larger Primozygodactylus mayor was found with grapes in its stomach. The wings were short and the legs long, indicating a maneuverable animal foraging in the undergrowth. At least in some species the central two tail feathers were greatly elongated and possibly used in display.	

=== Incertae sedis ===
Family	Genus	Species	Authority	Notes	Image
Incertae sedis	Aenigmatorhynchus	Aenigmatorhynchus rarus	Mayr & Smith, 2025	A bird with an unusual mandible, not confidently placeable in any extant bird order	
Eopachypterygidae	Eopachypteryx	Eopachypteryx praeterita Eopachypteryx ? sp.	Mayr, 2015		
Incertae sedis	Lapillavis	Lapillavis incubarens	Mayr, 2016		
Perplexicervicidae	Perplexicervix	Perplexicervix microcephalon	Mayr, 2010	The genus is named for the bony tubercles present on the cervical vertebrae. Although its relationship is not fully understood, it was found to not be a member of Idiornithidae and shared traits with Anhimidae and Cathartidae.	

== Mammals ==
=== Apatotheria ===
Family	Genus	Species	Authority	Notes	Image
Apatemyidae	Heterohyus	Heterohyus nanus	Teilhard de Chardin, 1921	A mammal with elongated fingers and strong teeth that resembles the modern aye-aye and likely filled a similar niche.	

=== Artiodactyla ===
Family	Genus	Species	Authority	Notes	Image
Dichobunidae	Aumelasia	Aumelasia cf. gabineaudi	Sudré, 1980	A lightly built early artiodactyl with a noticeably long tail. Aumelasia is referred to the Diacodexeidae by some researchers.	
Dichobunidae	Messelobunodon	Messelobunodon schaeferi	Franzen, 1980	An early species of even-toed ungulate.	
Choeropotamidae	Masillabune	Masillabune martini	Tobien, 1980	An early species of even-toed ungulate.	

=== Chiroptera ===
Family	Genus	Species	Authority	Notes	Image
Archaeonycteridae	Archaeonycteris	Archaeonycteris pollex Archaeonycteris trigonodon	Storch & Habersetzer, 1988 Revilliod, 1917	A basal genus among the Messel bats, Archaeonycteris resembles modern vesper bats in wing morphology and likely preferred more open spaces in the upper trunk areas to hunt. Stomach contents indicate a preference for beetles.	Archaeonycteris trigonodon
Hassianycterididae	Hassianycteris	Hassianycteris magna Hassianycteris messelensis Hassianycteris? revilliodi	Smith & Storch, 1981 Smith & Storch, 1981 (Russell & Sigé, 1970)	Hassianycteris was a somewhat heavy bat with narrow wings. Based on its anatomy, which resembles modern free-tailed bats, it was a fast flying animal hunting above the treetops.	Hassianycteris messelensis
Palaeochiropterygidae	Palaeochiropteryx	Palaeochiropteryx spiegeli Palaeochiropteryx tupaiodon	Revilliod, 1917	The wing morphology of Palaeochiropteryx indicates that it flew slowly but agile relatively close to the ground to catch insects such as moths and butterflies.	
Emballonuridae	Tachypteron	Tachypteron franzeni	Storch, Sigé & Habersetzer, 2002	A fast flying species that inhabited open airspaces, Tachypteron resembled the modern black-bearded tomb bat in proportions.	

=== Cimolesta ===
Family	Genus	Species	Authority	Notes	Image
Pantolestidae	Buxolestes	Buxolestes piscator Buxolestes minor	Koenigswald 1980 Pfretzschner 1999	Buxolestes is a member of a basal group of mammals. The proportions of Buxolestes piscator are similar to modern otters and its stomach contents indicate a diet of fish and small vertebrates. B. minor shows adaptations towards digging and was found with plant material in its stomach, but likely also fed on various animals.	
Paroxyclaenidae	Kopidodon	Kopidodon macrognathus	(Wittich, 1902)	Kopidodon was the first mammal discovered in Messel and grew to a length of 115 cm (45 in). It shows some adaptations towards a climbing lifestyle.	
Paroxyclaenidae	"Paroxyclaenus"	"Paroxyclaenus" sp.		An undescribed relative of Kopidodon differing through the lack of a pronounced sagittal crest.	

=== Eulipotyphla ===
Family	Genus	Species	Authority	Notes	Image
Amphilemuridae	Macrocranion	Macrocranion tenerum Macrocranion tupaiodon	Tobien, 1962 Weitzel, 1949	Macrocranion were small, likely nocturnal, animals living on the forest floor. M. tupaiodon reached a size of up to 30 cm (12 in) and was possibly omnivorous with woolly fur. The smaller M. tenerum meanwhile was inferred to be insectivorous and covered in bristles. Some researchers suggest it may have moved like modern springhares.	
Amphilemuridae	Pholidocercus	Pholidocercus hassiacus	von Koenigswald & Storch, 1983	A larger relative of Macrocranion, Pholidocercus was an animal 40 cm (16 in). Its proportions indicate that it was a quadrupedal animal that lived on the forest floor. The tail was covered in overlapping scales and the head was similarly covered in a hardened structure while the torso was covered in thick bristles.	

=== Leptictida ===
Family	Genus	Species	Authority	Notes	Image
Pseudorhyncocyonidae	Leptictidium	Leptictidium auderiense Leptictidium nasutum Leptictidium tobieni	Tobien, 1962 Storch & Lister, 1985 Von Koenigswald & Storch, 1987	Known from Messel in the form of three species and multiple specimens, Leptictidium was a eutherian mammal of uncertain relationships. Its hindlimbs are noticeably larger than its forelimbs, but its means of locomotion are not agreed upon.	

=== Metatheria ===
Family	Genus	Species	Authority	Notes	Image
Herpetotheriidae	Amphiperatherium	Amphiperatherium goethei Amphiperatherium cf. maximum	Crochet, 1979	A metatherian mammal, it was larger than Peradectes but with a proportionally shorter tail.	
Herpetotheriidae	Herpetotheriidae indet.			Either Amphiperatherium or Peratherium.	
Peradectidae	"Peradectes"	"Peradectes sp."		A small arboreal mammal similar to Peradectes with a prehensile tail.	

=== Pan-Carnivora ===
Family	Genus	Species	Authority	Notes	Image
Proviverridae	Lesmesodon	Lesmesodon behnkeae Lesmesodon edingeri	(Morlo & Habersetzer, 1999) (Springhorn, 1982)	Agile predators of the forest floor, at least one species (L. behnkeae) is known to have had a bushy tail. The exact position hyaenodontids like Lesmesodon have within mammals is debated.	
Miacidae	Messelogale	Messelogale kessleri	(Springhorn, 1982)	Originally thought to be a species of Miacis, it was elevated to its own genus in 2000. Unlike Lesmesodon it was an arboreal hunter.	
Miacidae	Paroodectes	Paroodectes feisti	Springhorn, 1980	An arboreal miacid.	

=== Pholidotamorpha ===
Family	Genus	Species	Authority	Notes	Image
Eomanidae	Eomanis	Eomanis waldi	Storch, 1978	Eomanis is a more derived member of Pholidota than the contemporary genera found in Messel and already shows the classic scales this group is known for.	
	Euromanis	Euromanis krebsi	(Storch & Martin, 1994)	A type of scaleless pangolin originally described as a species of Eomanis.	
Eurotamanduidae	Eurotamandua	Eurotamandua joresi	Storch, 1981	Described as an anteater based on the enlarged claws and elongated skull, later research concluded that it was more likely to be a type of pangolin.	

=== Perissodactyla ===
Family	Genus	Species	Authority	Notes	Image
Palaeotheriidae	Eurohippus	Eurohippus parvulus Eurohippus messelensis	(Laurillard, 1849) (Haupt, 1925)	Originally species of Propalaeotherium and Lophiotherium, they were elevated to a distinct genus in 2006. Several specimens were preserved with their fetus, showing that they only carried a single foal.	
	Hallensia	Hallensia matthesi	Franzen & Haubold, 1986	A small species of primitive horse.	
Hyrachyidae	Hyrachyus	Hyrachyus minimus	Fischer, 1829	An early rhinoceratoid or tapir, its discovery played a rolle in making Messel a protected site.	
Palaeotheriidae	Propalaeotherium	Propalaeotherium hassiacum	Haupt, 1925	An early species of horse reaching a shoulder height of 55–60 cm (22–24 in), making it larger than Eurohippus.	

=== Primates ===
Family	Genus	Species	Authority	Notes	Image
Adapidae	Darwinius	Darwinius masillae	Franzen et al., 2009	An early primate known from a single specimen preserved in two slabs. The counterslab includes several elements fabricated to make it appear more complete. The classification of Darwinius has been subject to continued debate.	
Adapidae	Europolemur	Europolemur kelleri Europolemur koenigswaldi	Franzen, 2000 Franzen, 1987	An early primate primarily known from partial remains. One lower jaw was found in the coprolite of Buxolestes while another fossil was found with the tooth of a crocodile embedded into it.	

=== Rodentia ===
Family	Genus	Species	Authority	Notes	Image
Alagomyidae	Ailuravus	Ailuravus macrurus	Weitzel, 1949	An arboreal rodent that resembles modern squirrels in proportion. It reached a total length of 1 m (3 ft 3 in), most of which consisting of the bushy tail, and primarily fed on leaves.	
Gliridae	Eogliravus	Eogliravus wildi	Hartenberger, 1971	The oldest known dormouse E. wildi had a long, bushy tail It was likely herbivorous, feeding on seeds and plant buds.	
Ischyromyidae	Masillamys	Masillamys beegeri			
Ischyromyidae	Masillamys	Masillamys krugi			
Ischyromyidae	Masillamys	Masillamys parvus	Tobien, 1954	M. parvus was sometimes placed in Hartenbergeromys, However a 2019 study found the asserted differences to the type species insufficient to warrant this split. Its tail was only sparsely covered in fur.	Masillamys
