= 1988 in paleontology =

Paleontology or palaeontology is the study of prehistoric life forms on Earth through the examination of plant and animal fossils. This includes the study of body fossils, tracks (ichnites), burrows, cast-off parts, fossilised feces (coprolites), palynomorphs and chemical residues. Because humans have encountered fossils for millennia, paleontology has a long history both before and after becoming formalized as a science. This article records significant discoveries and events related to paleontology that occurred or were published in the year 1988.

== Plants ==
=== Angiosperms ===
Name	Novelty	Status	Authors	Age	Unit	Location	Synonymy	Notes	Images
Hemiptelea mikii	sp nov		Minaki, Noshiro, & Suzuki	Pleistocene		Japan		An ulmaceous species	
Keratosperma	Gen et sp nov	valid	Cevallos-Ferriz & Stockey	Eocene; Ypresian	Okanagan Highlands; Princeton Chert	Canada; British Columbia		A lasioid arum family seed genus. The type species is K. allenbyensis	
Pistillipollianthus	Gen et sp nov	valid	Stockey & Manchester	Eocene; Ypresian	Okanagan Highlands; Horsefly Shales	Canada; British Columbia		A flower of uncertain affinities The type species is P. wilsoni. Producer of the Pistillipollenites macgregorii palynomorph.	
Salmonensea	Gen et Comb nov	Valid	Wolfe & Wehr	late Middle Eocene	Salmon Flora	USA; Idaho		A rosaceous genus The type species is S. prefoliolosa Moved from Chamaebatia prefoliolosa (1935)	Salmonensea prefoliolosa
Sorbaria wahrhaftigii	Sp nov	Valid	Wolfe & Wehr	Eocene latest Eocene	Rex Creek Flora	USA; Alaska		A rosaceous species	Sorbaria wahrhaftigii
Stockeya	Gen, sp et Comb nov	Valid	Wolfe & Wehr	late Oligocene	Creede Formation	USA; Colorado	Chamaebatiaria creedensis (1937)	A rosaceous genus The type species is S. creedensis Also includes S. montana	Stockeya montana
Stonebergia	Gen et sp nov	Valid	Wolfe & Wehr	Eocene; Ypresian	Okanagan Highlands; Allenby Formation	Canada; British Columbia		A rosaceous genus The type species is S. columbiana	Stonebergia columbiana

== Arthropods ==
=== Crustaceans ===
Name	Novelty	Status	Authors	Age	Unit	Location	Notes	Images
Pseudotealliocaris palincsari	Sp nov	jr synonym	Schram	Famennian	Huntley Mountain Formation	USA; Pennsylvania	Moved to the genus Tealliocaris in 2013. Though initially reported to be from the Pocono Formation, the deposits it was found in are now considered part of the Huntley Mountain Formation.	

=== Insects ===
Name	Novelty	Status	Authors	Age	Unit	Location	Synonymy	Notes	Images
Aneuretellus	Gen et sp nov	valid	Dlussky	Middle Eocene	Sakhalin amber	Russia		An aneuretine ant	
Protopone primigena	Gen et sp nov	valid	Dlussky	Middle Eocene	Sakhalin amber	Russia		A ponerine ant	Protopone primigena
Zherichinius	Gen et 2 sp nov	valid	Dlussky	Middle Eocene	Sakhalin amber	Russia		A dolichoderine ant The type species is Z. horiibilis Also includes Z. rapax	Zherichinius horribilis

== Archosauromorphs ==
=== Newly named non-avian dinosaurs ===
Data courtesy of George Olshevsky's dinosaur genera list.

- The dubious family, Ornitholestidae is named by Gregory Scott Paul.

Name	Novelty	Status	Authors	Age	Unit	Location	Synonymy	Notes	Images
Anserimimus	Gen et sp nov	Valid	Barsbold	Late Cretaceous	Nemegt Formation	Mongolia		An ornithomimid theropod	Anserimimus planinychus
Brachylophosaurus goodwini	Sp nov	Junior synonym	Horner	Campanian	McClellend Ferry Member, Judith River Formation	USA Montana		A saurolophine hadrosaurid. Junior synonym of Brachylophosaurus canadensis or an indeterminate brachylophosaurin.	
Cathetosaurus	Gen et sp nov	valid	Jensen	Late Jurassic		USA Colorado		A camarasauromorph sauropod The type species is C. lewisi	Cathetosaurus lewisi
"Chassternbergia"	Subgen Nov	Junior synonym	Bakker	Campanian	Dinosaur Park Formation	Canada Alberta		Jr synonym of Edmontonia	Edmontonia rugosidens
Denversaurus	Gen et sp nov	Valid	Bakker	Cretaceous late Maastrichtian	Lance Formation	USA		A nodosaurid	Denversaurus schlessmani (on left)
Giraffatitan	Gen et comb nov	Valid	Paul	Late Jurassic	Tendaguru formation	Tanzania	Brachiosaurus brancai 1914 Brachiosaurus fraasi 1914	A sauropod The type species is G. brancai	Giraffatitan brancai
"Hironosaurus"	Gen nov	Nomen nudum	Hisa	Late Cretaceous		Japan		A possible hadrosaurid, undescribed	
"Kagasaurus"	Gen nov	Nomen nudum	Hisa	Early Cretaceous		Japan		A possible dromeosaurid, undescribed	
Kotasaurus	Gen et sp nov	Valid	Yadagiri	Early Jurassic	Kota Formation	India		A basal sauropod	
Nanotyrannus	Gen et comb nov	Valid?	Bakker, Williams, & Currie	Late Cretaceous	Lance Formation	USA Montana		Possible junior synonym of Tyrannosaurus.	Nanotyrannus lancensis
Orodromeus	Gen et sp nov	Valid	Horner & Weishampel	Cretaceous Campanian	Two Medicine Formation			An ornithopod The type species is O. makelai	Orodromeus makelai
"Protognathus"	Gen et sp nov	Senior synonym	Zhang	Middle Jurassic	Shaximiao Formation	China		Junior homonym of Protognathus Basilewsky, 1950; (syn. for Pseudognathaphanus, Schauberger, 1932); renamed Protognathosaurus in 1991	
"Stenotholus"	Gen et sp nov	Junior synonym	Giffin, Gabriel, & Johnson	Late Cretaceous	Hell Creek Formation	USA Montana		Junior synonym of Stygimoloch	Stygimoloch spinifer

=== Newly named birds ===
Name	Status	Novelty	Authors	Age	Unit	Location	Synonymy	Notes	Images
Ciconia kahli	Valid	Sp. nov.	Haarhoff	Early Pliocene	Varswater Formation	South Africa		A Ciconiidae.	
Diomedea rumana	Valid	Sp. nov.	Grigorescu & Kessler	Middle Miocene		Romania		A Diomedeidae.	
Gymnogyps kofordi	Valid	Sp. nov.	Emslie	Pleistocene; Irvingtonian		USA; Florida		A Cathartidae.	
Hadrogyps	Valid	Gen. et sp. nov.	Emslie	Middle Miocene; Barstovian	Round Mountain Silt	USA; California		A cathartid The type species is H. aigialeus.	
Jungornis	Valid	Fam, gen et sp nov.	Karkhu	Early Oligocene	Maykop Formation	Russia		A Jungornithidae Apodiformes the type species is J. tesselatus.	
Lithornis	Valid	Subord, Fam, Gen et sp. nov.	Houde	Late Paleocene; Early Tiffanian	Fort Union Formation	USA; Montana		A lithornithid palaeognathaen The genus includes L. celetius, L. plebius, & L. promiscuus	
Messelornis	Valid	Fam, gen et sp nov.	Hesse	Eocene; Ypresian	Messel Formation	Germany; Hessen		A Messelornithidae Ralliformes; The type species is M. cristata.	
Morus olsoni	Valid	Sp. nov.	Grigorescu & Kessler	Middle Miocene		Romania		A Sulidae.	
Pachyplichas	Valid	Gen et sp. nov.	Millener	Late Quaternary; Otiran Glacial Stage?		New Zealand		An Acanthisittidae; The type species is P. yaldwyni. Also includes P. jagmi	
Phocavis maritimus	Valid	Gen et Sp nov.	Goedert	Late Eocene	Keasey Formation	USA; Oregon		A Plotopteridae Pelecaniformes; The type species is P. maritimus	
Porphyrio paepae	Valid	Sp. nov.	Steadman	Holocene	Tahuata & Hiva Oa	French Polynesia; Marquesas Islands		A Rallidae.	
Primocolius	Valid	Gen et sp. nov.	Mourer-Chauviré	Late Eocene	Phosphorites du Quercy	France		A Coliidae. The type species is P. sigei Also includes P. minor	
Pseudocrypturus	Valid	Gen et sp. nov.	Houde	Eocene; Ypresian	Green River Formation	USA; Wyoming		A Lithornithidae Palaeognathae. The type species is P. cercanaxius.	
Psilopterus colzecus	Valid	Sp. nov.	Tonni & Tambussi	Late Miocene; Chasicoan	Arroyo Chasicó Formation	Argentina		A Psilopterinae Phorusrhacidae.	
Sula tasmani	Valid	Sp. nov.	Tets, Meredith, Fullagar, & Davidson	Holocene	Lord Howe & Norfolk Islands	Australia; New South Wales		A Sulidae,	
Sylphornis	Valid	Fam, gen et sp. nov.	Mourer-Chauviré	Late Eocene		France		A Sylphornithidae basal Piciformes; The type species is S. bretouensis	
Taubacrex	Valid	Gen et sp. nov.	Alvarenga	Late Oligocene-Early Miocene	Tremembé Formation	Brazil		A Quercymegapodiidae the type species is T. granivora	
Tshulia	Valid	Gen et sp. nov.	Nessov	Late Paleocene		Kazakhstan		A possible Rallidae; The type species is T. litorea	
Ventivorus	Valid	Gen et sp. nov.	Mourer-Chauviré	Late Eocene		France		A Caprimulgidae; The type species is V. ragei.	
Zheroia	Valid	Gen et sp. nov.	Nessov	Eocene; Bartonian		Uzbekistan		A Graculavidae genus The type species is Z. kurochkini.	
Zhylgaia	Valid	Gen et sp nov.	Nessov	Late Paleocene		Kazakhstan		A Prophaethontidae Pelecaniformes; The type species is Z. aestiflua	

== Pterosaurs ==
=== New taxa ===
Name	Novelty	Status	Authors	Age	Unit	Location	Synonymy	Notes	Images
Tupuxuara	Gen et sp nov	Valid	Kellner & Campos	Cretaceous	Santana Formation	Brazil		A Thalassodromidae pterosaur	Tupuxuara leonardii
