= Protognathus =

Protognathus may refer to:

- Protognathus, genus of ground beetle described in 1950 but later considered as a synonym of Pseudognathaphanus.
- Protognathosaurus, genus of sauropod that is originally described as Protognathus.
- Protognathodus, genus of conodont, sometimes described as Protognathus.
- Protognathinus, genus of extinct beetle that is sometimes misspelled as Protognathus.
