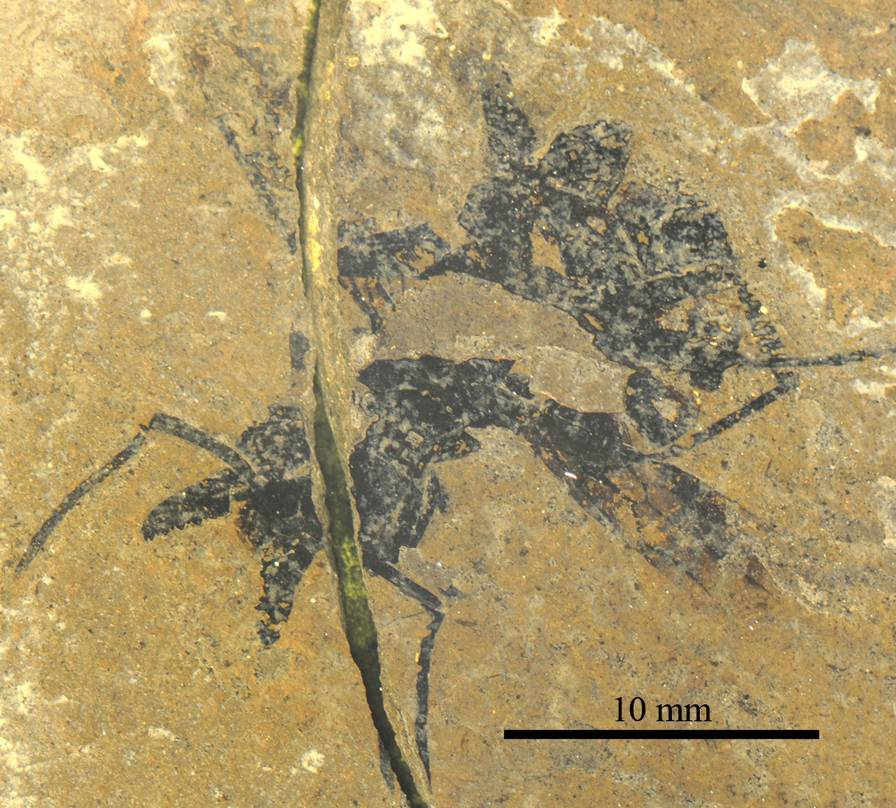
- C. grandis holotype

Scientific classification
- Domain: Eukaryota
- Kingdom: Animalia
- Phylum: Arthropoda
- Class: Insecta
- Order: Hymenoptera
- Family: Formicidae
- Subfamily: Ponerinae
- Tribe: Ponerini
- Genus: †Cephalopone; Dlussky & Wedmann, 2012

Type species
- Cephalopone potens

Species
- C. grandis; C. potens

= Cephalopone =

Cephalopone Temporal range: Lutetian

Extinct genus of ants

Cephalopone is an extinct genus of ants in the formicid subfamily Ponerinae described from fossils found in Europe. There are two described species placed into the genus, Cephalopone grandis and Cephalopone potens. Cephalopone is one several Lutetian Ponerinae genera.

== History and classification ==
When described, Cephalopone was known from three fossil insects which are compression-impression fossils preserved in layers of soft sedimentary rock. Along with other well preserved insect fossils, the Cephalopone specimens were collected from layers of the Lutetian Messel pit World Heritage Site. The formation is composed of brown coals, oil shales, and bituminous shale, which preserved numerous insects, fish, birds, reptiles, and terrestrial mammals as a notable lagerstätten. The area is a preserved maar lake which initially formed approximately 47 million years ago as the result of volcanic explosions.

At the time of description, the holotype and paratype specimens were preserved in the Senckenberg Research Station Messel fossil collections. The fossils were described by Gennady Dlussky and Sonja Wedmann in a 2012 paper on the poneromorph ants of Messel, with the genus and both species named in it. The genus name is a combination of the ant genus Ponera and the Greek word cephale, meaning head. The specific epithet "grandis" is derived from the Latin meaning "strong," while the name "potens" is based on the Latin meaning "strong" or "powerful".

Cephalopone is one of five extinct genera from three subfamilies which have species described from Messel Formation fossils by Dlussky and Wedmann in 2012. Three of the other genera Cyrtopone, Messelepone, and Protopone are also placed in Ponerinae. The genus Casaleia is placed in Amblyoponinae, while the last genus Pseudectatomma is in Ectatomminae.

== Description ==
The Cephalopone queens from Messel are described as large, having approximate body lengths ranging over 20 millimetres (0.79 in). Species have heads that are up to, but no longer than 1.5 times the length of the mesosoma. The subtriangular mandibles are large, being over 80% of the length of the head, and have nine to ten teeth on the chewing faces. Like Protopone species, the antennae sockets are widely placed on the head, in contrast to those seen in Pachycondyla which are close together. On both the hind and middle tibiae there are a pair of spurs, one simple and one pectinate. The petiole is rounded with a helcium that projects of the front face of the gasteral segment.

=== C. grandis ===
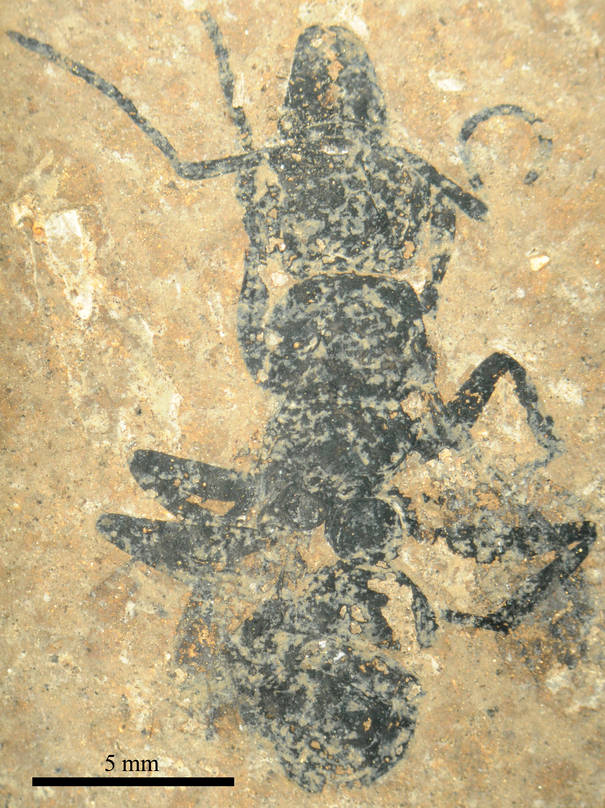
C. potens

C. grandis is known from a single fossil, consisting of a winged gyne preserved with the top of the body showing in the fossil. The body has an approximate length of 26 mm (1.0 in) with a squared off head that has slightly bulged back margin with rounded corners on each side. The clypeus has a slight downward cure along its front edge and bears a pair of protrusions on the lateral edges. The antennae have segments that range from 1.2 to 2 times as long as they are wide, with a scape is slightly extending past the back edge of the head. The large mandibles are about 87% of the head length and each one has ten teeth. The two teeth at the ends of the mandibles are both large, while the remaining teeth alternate between large and small.

=== C. potens ===
Two specimens were used to describe C. potens, both of mostly complete winged queens preserved as dorsal impressions. The body length of the queens is between 21–22.5 mm (0.83–0.89 in) with a square shaped petiole and a mesosoma that is 1.5-1.6 times longer than the head. The small eyes are placed just to the front of the heads midpoint. The clypeus is rounded on it front edge and the antennae have a scape which reaches the back edge of the head. The mandibles are approximately the length of the head, subtriangular in shape, and have nine teeth alternating between large and small.
