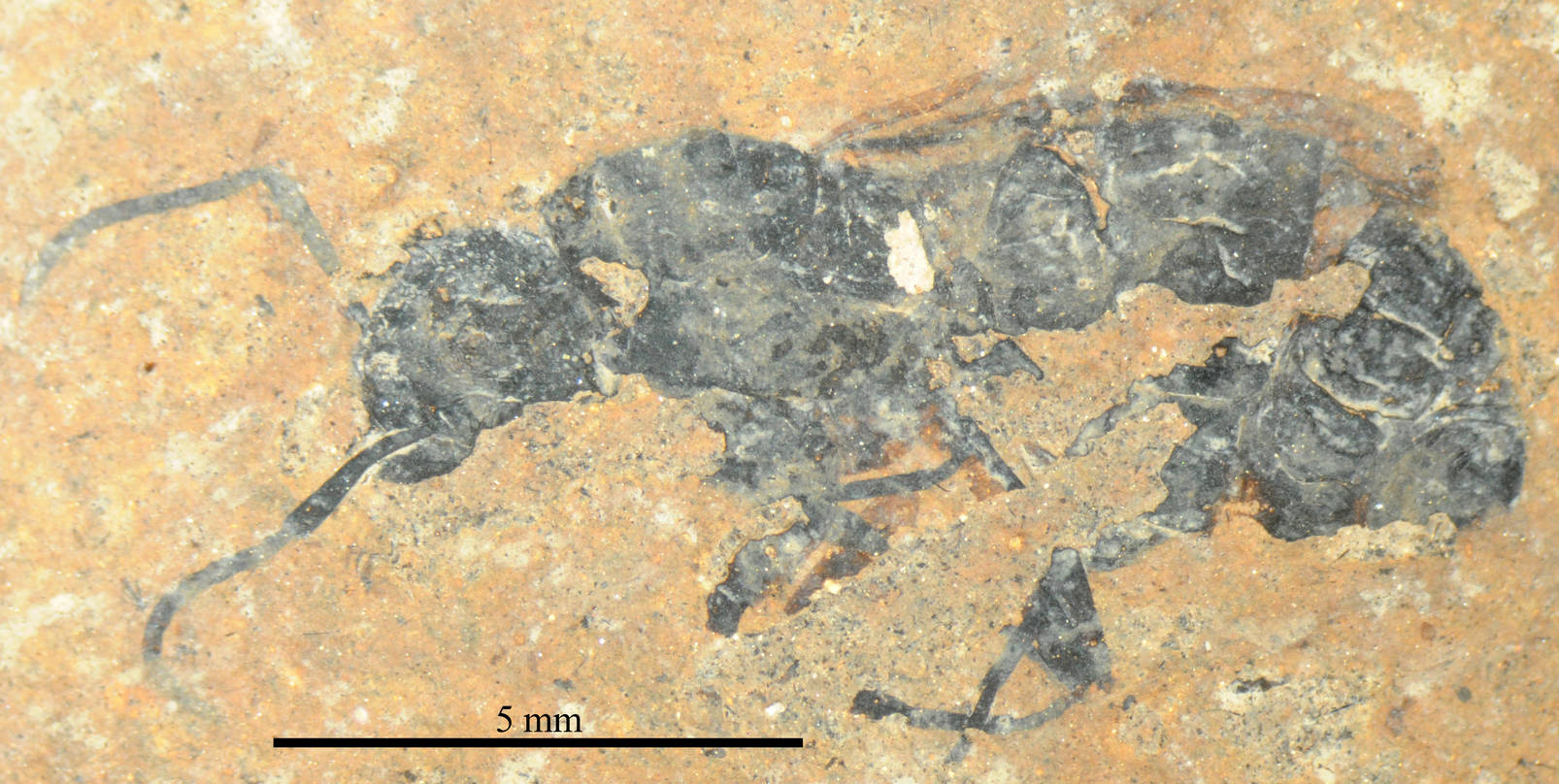
- C. microcephala holotype

Scientific classification
- Domain: Eukaryota
- Kingdom: Animalia
- Phylum: Arthropoda
- Class: Insecta
- Order: Hymenoptera
- Family: Formicidae
- Subfamily: Ponerinae
- Tribe: Ponerini
- Genus: †Cyrtopone; Dlussky & Wedmann, 2012

Type species
- Cyrtopone microcephala

Species
- C. curiosa; C. elongata; C. microcephala; C. striata

= Cyrtopone =

Cyrtopone Temporal range: Middle Eocene

Extinct genus of ants

Cyrtopone is an extinct genus of ants in the formicid subfamily Ponerinae described from fossils found in Europe. There are four described species placed into the genus, Cyrtopone curiosa, Cyrtopone elongata, Cyrtopone microcephala, and Cyrtopone striata. Cyrtopone is one several Lutetian Ponerinae genera.

== History and classification ==
When described, Cyrtopone was known from four fossil insects which are compression-impression fossils preserved in layers of soft sedimentary rock. Along with other well preserved insect fossils, the Cyrtopone specimens were collected from layers of the Lutetian Messel pit World Heritage Site. The formation is composed of brown coals, oil shales, and bituminous shale, which preserved numerous insects, fish, birds, reptiles, and terrestrial mammals as a notable lagerstätten. The area is a preserved maar lake which initially formed approximately 47 million years ago as the result of volcanic explosions.

At the time of description, the four holotype specimens were preserved in the Senckenberg Research Station Messel fossil collections. The fossils were described by Gennady Dlussky and Sonja Wedmann in a 2012 paper on the poneromorph ants of Messel, with the genus and four species named in it. The genus name is a combination of the ant genus Ponera and the Greek word cyrtos, meaning curved.

Cyrtopone is one of five extinct genera from three subfamilies which have species described from Messel Formation fossils by Dlussky and Wedmann in 2012. Three of the other genera Cephalopone, Messelepone, and Protopone are also placed in Ponerinae. The genus Casaleia is placed in Amblyoponinae, while the last genus Pseudectatomma is in Ectatomminae.

== Description ==
The Cyrtopone queens from Messel are described as having approximate body lengths ranging between 6.2–14.7 millimetres (0.24–0.58 in). Species have heads that are distinctly small, the mesosoma being about 2 times greater in length. The subtriangular mandibles are up to one half the head length and have toothed chewing faces. Like Protopone species, the antennae sockets are widely placed on the head, in contrast to those seen in Pachycondyla which are close together. The node shaped petiole is shorter than the height, with a helcium that projects of the front face of the gasteral segment.

=== C. curiosa ===
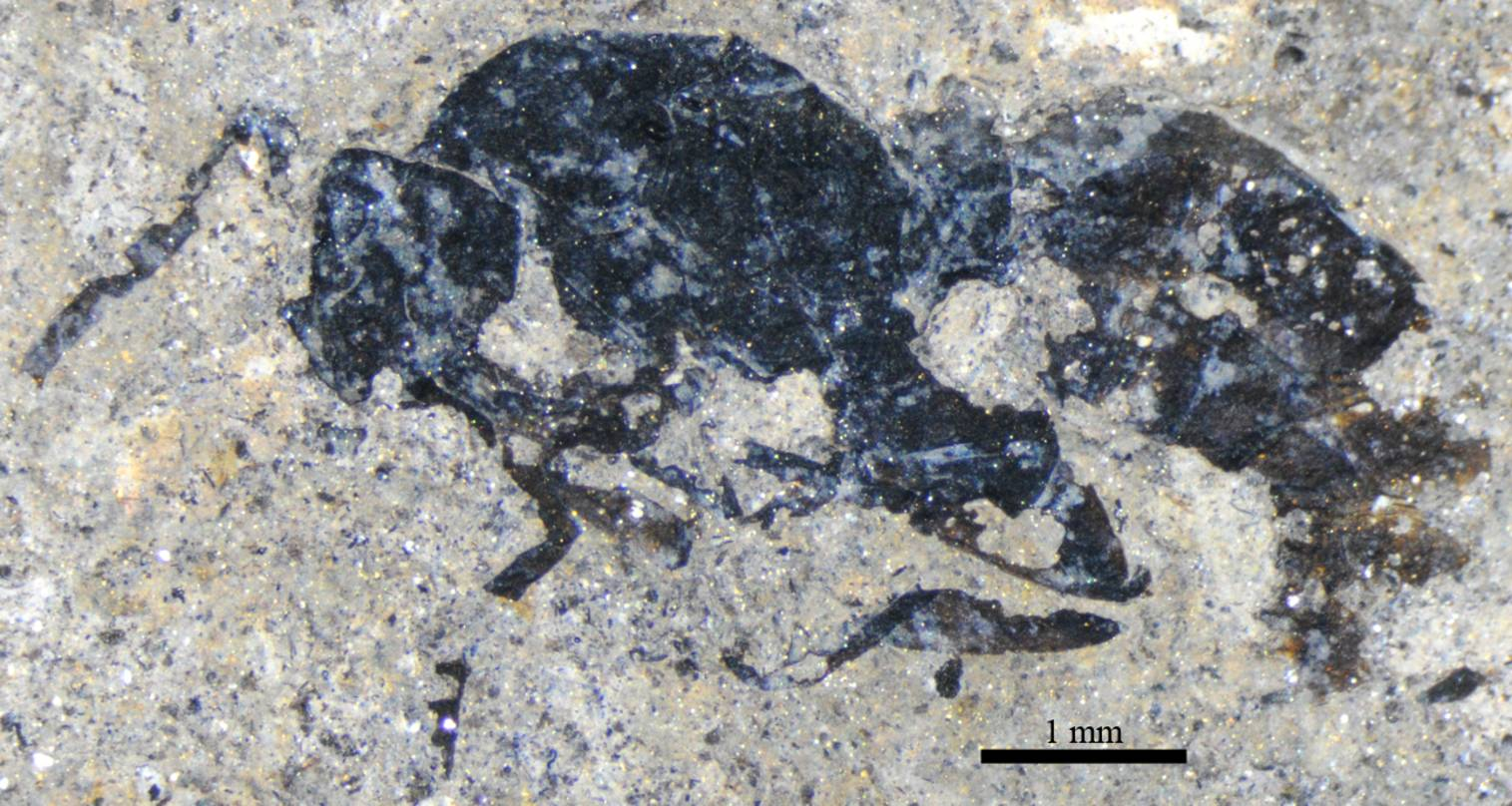
C. curiosa

The only C. curiosa fossil is of a wingless gyne preserved in profile view with a body about 7.5 mm (0.30 in) long. The head is slightly rectangular and 1.8 times shorter than the mesosoma. The sides are mostly straight, while the back corners are rounded the back edge is convex and the eyes are placed just behind the middle point of the head. The antennae have a scape which reaches just past the back edge of the head. The frons stretches across a quarter of the head front. The mesosoma is massive, and 3.2 times longer than the scutum. The species name "curiosa" is derived from the Latin curiosus which means funny.

=== C. elongata ===
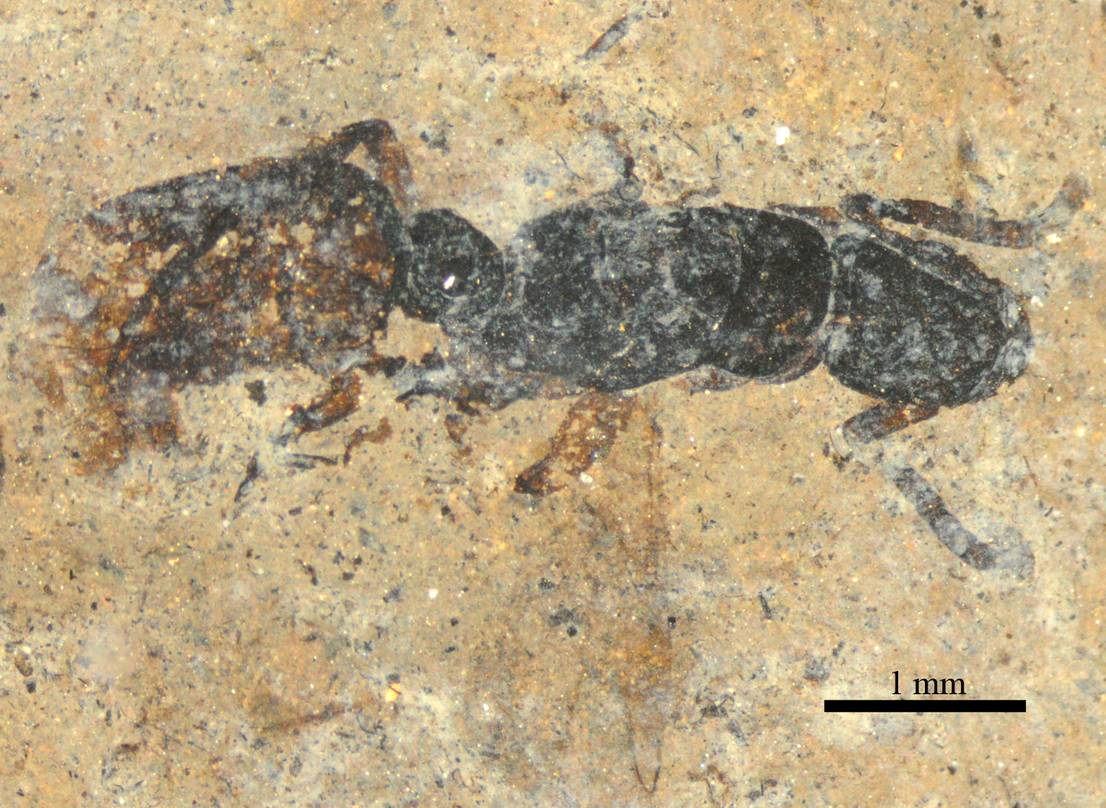
C. elongata

The described C. elongata fossil is the only queen preserved as dorsal impression. The body length of the winged queen is approximately 5.7 mm (0.22 in) long with a node shaped petiole and a mesosoma that is double the length of the head. As with C. curiosa, the head has nearly parallel sides rounded back corners and a convex back margin, though the head in C. elongata is distinctly rectangular. The oval eyes are placed just to the front of the heads midpoint and the gena are bigger than the maximum eye width. The antennae have a scape which reaches the back edge of the head, while the segments gradually thicken from scape to tip. but they do not form a distinct club at the tip. Each of the antenna segments are about the same width as they are long. The mandibles are approximately 45% to 50% the length of the head. Dlussky and Wedmann coined the species name elongata from the Latin "elongates" meaning elongated.

=== C. microcephala ===
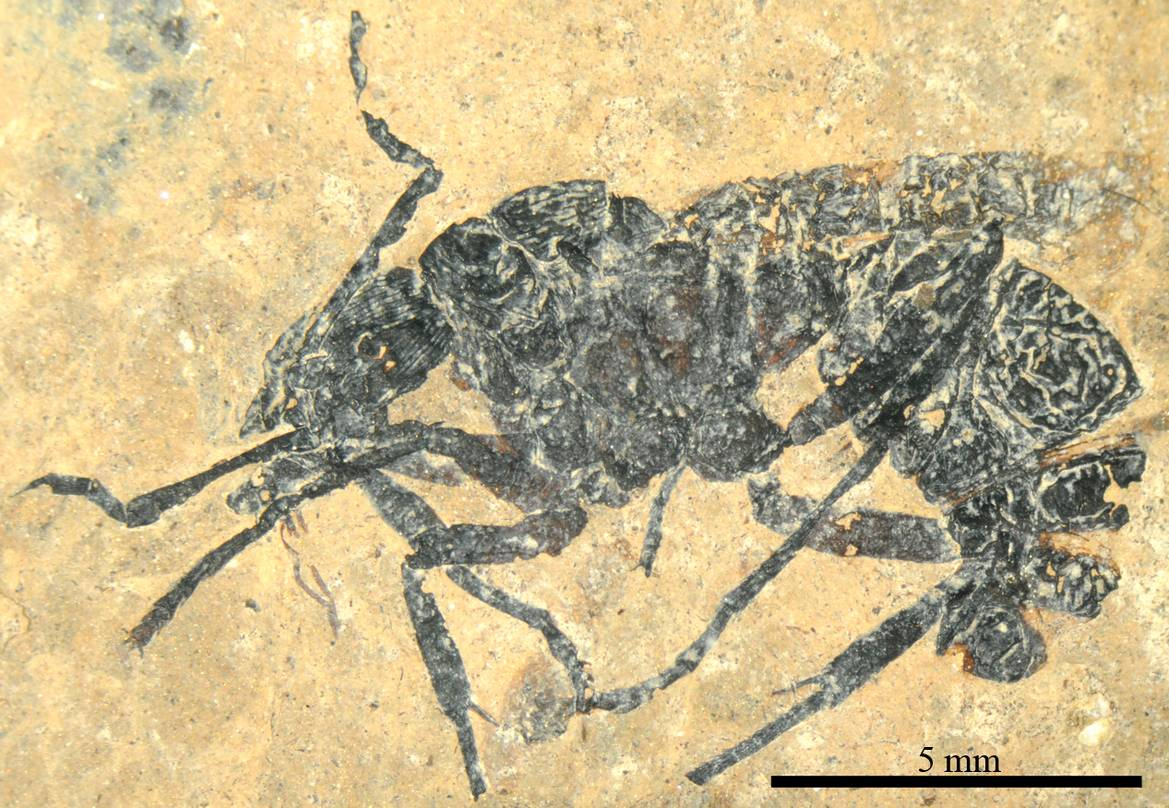
C. striata

C. microcephala is known from a single fossil, a winged gyne preserved in profile view. The body has an approximate length of 12.5 mm (0.49 in) with an essentially square head. The head is 1.5 times shorter than the mesosoma and has a sculpturing of small pits. The clypeus has a trapezohedral shape to the lower edge, and the eyes are placed at the middle point of the head. The antennae have segments that are 2 times as long as they are wide, with a scape which reaches to the back edge of the head. The mandibles are small, being under half the head length and each chewing side is toothed. The species name is taken from the Greek "microcephalos", which translates to "with a small head".

=== C. striata ===
The largest of the Cyrtopone species, C. striata has a body length of about 14.5 mm (0.57 in) and has the biggest difference between head and mesosoma, the head being 2.5 times shorter. The winged gyne is a dorsal impression showing distinct sculpturing on the head and scutum made of longitudinal ridges. The eyes are small, placed near the center of the head, and the gena below them are nearly one and a half times longer than the eye diameter. The scape is longer than in the other species with one third of its length extending past the back margin of the head. The metatibiae shows two spurs, a simple and a pectinate one.
