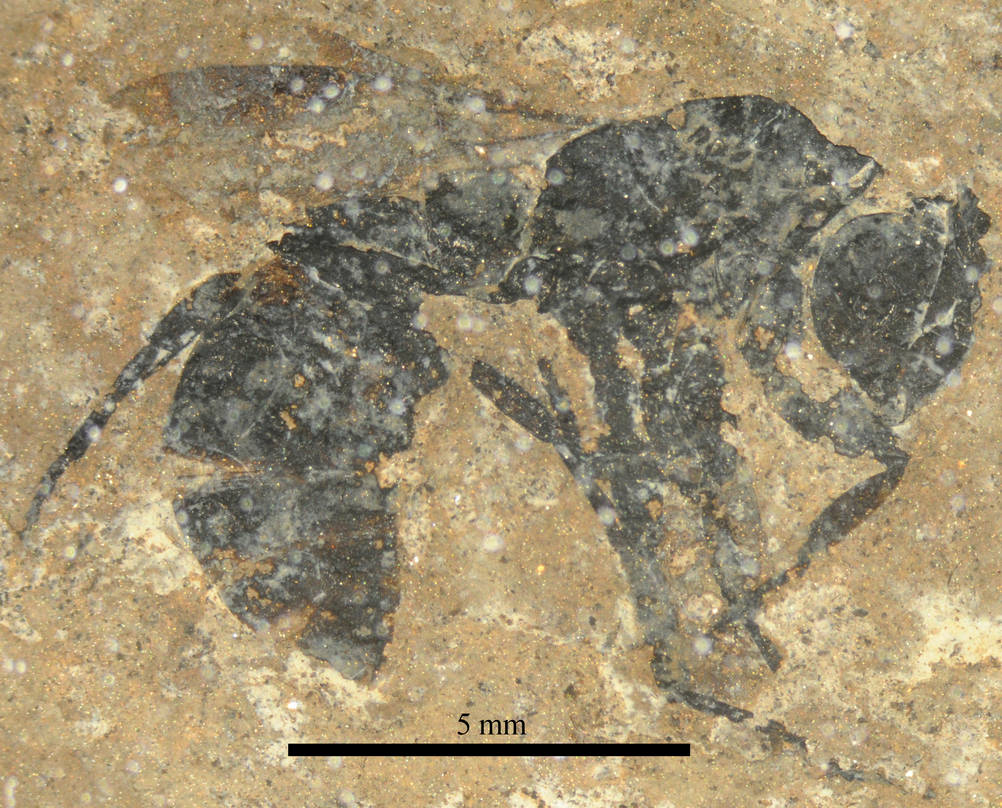
- M. leptogenoides holotype

Scientific classification
- Domain: Eukaryota
- Kingdom: Animalia
- Phylum: Arthropoda
- Class: Insecta
- Order: Hymenoptera
- Family: Formicidae
- Subfamily: Ponerinae
- Tribe: Ponerini
- Genus: †Messelepone; Dlussky & Wedmann, 2012
- Species: †M. leptogenoides

Binomial name
- †Messelepone leptogenoides Dlussky & Wedmann, 2012

= Messelepone =

Messelepone Temporal range: Lutetian, 47 Ma

Extinct genus of ants

Messelepone is an extinct genus of ants in the formicid subfamily Ponerinae described from fossils found in Europe. M. leptogenoides is the only species assigned to the genus, which is one of several Lutetian Ponerinae genera.

== History and classification ==
When described, Messelepone was known from two fossil insects which are compression-impression fossils preserved in layers of soft sedimentary rock. Along with other well preserved insect fossils, the Messelepone specimens were collected from layers of the Lutetian Messel pit World Heritage Site. The formation is composed of brown coals, oil shales, and bituminous shale, which preserved numerous insects, fish, birds, reptiles, and terrestrial mammals as a notable lagerstätten. The area is a preserved maar lake which initially formed approximately 47 million years ago as the result of volcanic explosions.

At the time of description, the holotype queen and paratype male specimens were preserved in the Senckenberg Research Station Messel fossil collections. The fossils were described by Gennady Dlussky and Sonja Wedmann in a 2012 paper on the poneromorph ants of Messel, with both the genus and species named in it. The genus name is a combination of the ant genus Ponera and Messel after the type locality. The specific epithet was derived from the modern ant genus name Leptogenys, which M. leptogenoides has similarities to.

Messelepone is one of five extinct genera from three subfamilies which have species described from Messel Formation fossils by Dlussky and Wedmann in 2012. Three of the other genera Cephalopone, Cyrtopone, and Protopone are also placed in Ponerinae. The genus Casaleia is placed in Amblyoponinae, while the last genus Pseudectatomma is in Ectatomminae.

== Description ==
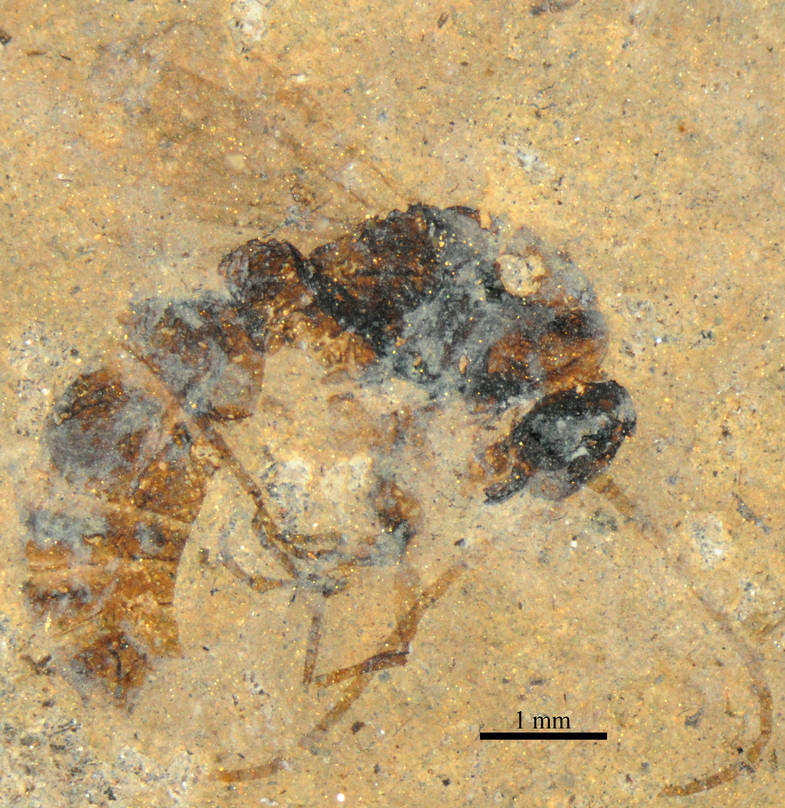
M. leptogenoides male

The Messelepone queen was described as having an approximate body length of 14 millimetres (0.55 in) with a head that is distinctly small, the mesosoma being almost two times greater in length. The subtriangular mandibles are up to one half the head length and have toothed chewing faces. Like Protopone species, the antennae sockets are widely placed on the head, in contrast to those seen in Pachycondyla which are close together. The node-shaped petiole is shorter than the height, with a helcium that projects of the front face of the gasteral segment. Both the queen and male have a distinct petiole, rectangular in side view, similar to some species of Leptogenys. Both genders also have a gaster with the first segment shorter than the second segment. The queen has eyes that are oval in shape and placed slightly forward from the heads midpoint. The gena below the eyes are a little shorter than the eyes are wide. The rectangular petiole lacks a peduncle between it and the mesosoma. The male is smaller than the gyne, with an estimated body length of 7.3 mm (0.29 in). The eyes are round and the gena only half as long as the eyes are wide. The thirteen segmented antennae have a filifrom morphology and the scape is short. The second antenna segment is nearly the same length as wide, contrasting the next segment which is 3.5 times longer than wide. The mandibles are well developed and opposable, a feature that separates M. leptogenoides males from those of Pachycondyla species.
