= Protamblyopone =

Protamblyopone can refer to:

- Protamblyopone Wheeler, 1927, junior synonym of Amblyopone
- Protamblyopone Dlussky, 1981, homonym replaced by Casaleia
