= Pellornis =

Pellornis Temporal range: 55.8–48.6 Ma Early Eocene

Scientific classification
- Kingdom: Animalia
- Phylum: Chordata
- Class: Aves
- Order: Gruiformes
- Family: †Messelornithidae
- Genus: †Pellornis; Bertelli et al., 2011

Type species
- †Pellornis mikkelseni (Bertelli et al. 2011)

Extinct genus of birds

Pellornis is an extinct genus of gruiform bird from the Early Eocene of Denmark.

== See also ==
- Dinosaur coloration
