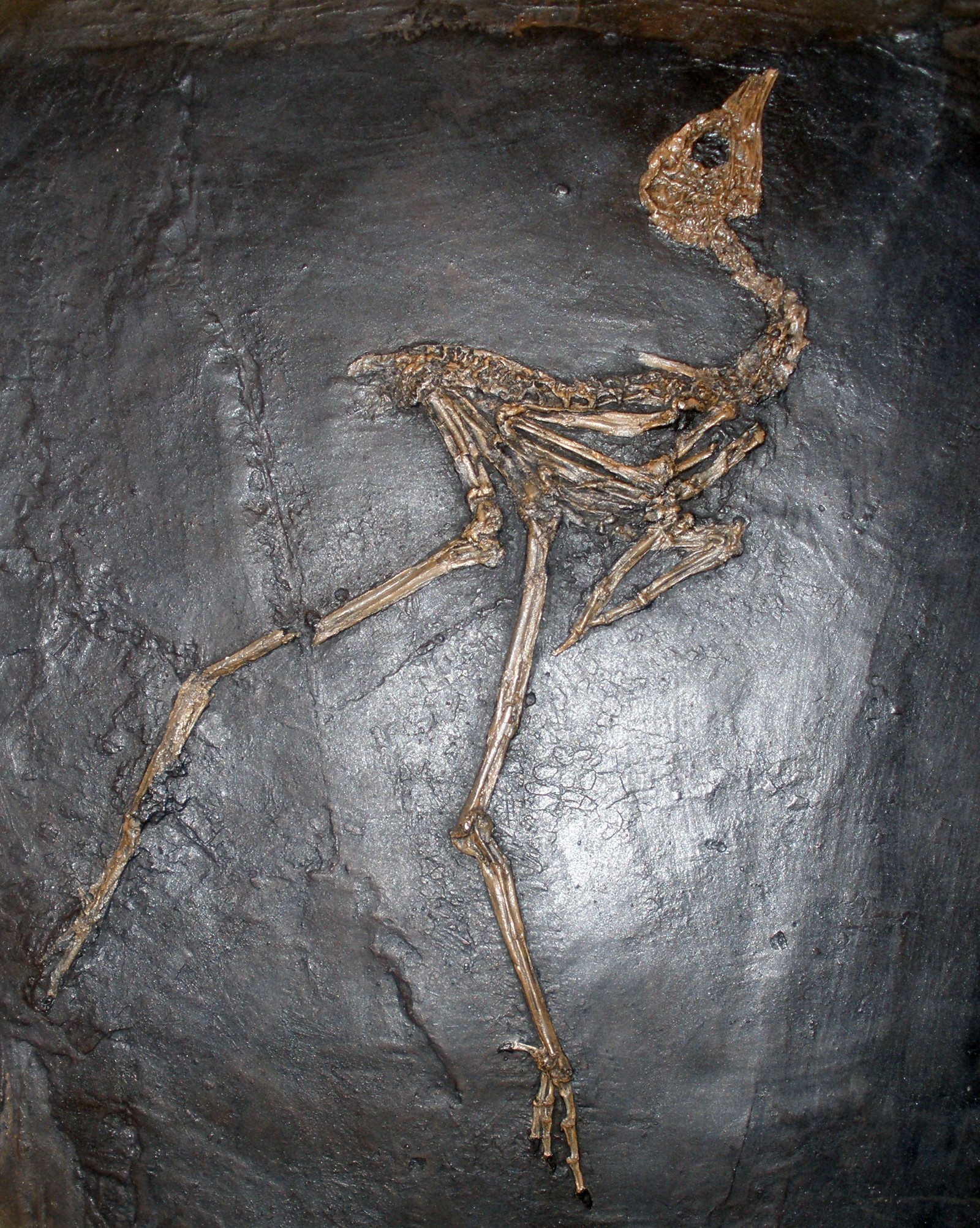
- Fossil of M. cristata preserved within resin as a result of the Transfer technique

Scientific classification
- Kingdom: Animalia
- Phylum: Chordata
- Class: Aves
- Order: Gruiformes
- Family: †Messelornithidae
- Genus: †Messelornis; Hesse, 1988

Species
- M. cristata Hesse, 1988; M. nearctica Hesse, 1992; M. russelli Mourer-Chaviré, 1995

= Messelornis =

Messelornis Temporal range: Late Paleocene–Middle Eocene

Extinct genus of birds

Messelornis, also known as the Messel rail, is an extinct genus of gruiform bird, closely related to modern rails. It is the most abundant bird from the Messel Lagerstätte, representing roughly half of all Messel bird fossils with more than 500 specimens known. The fossil record of Messelornis ranges from the Paleocene to the middle Eocene. Both the European species, M. cristata, from Messel, and the North American species, M. nearctica, from the Green River Formation lived during the Early Eocene Climatic Optimum.

Messelornis was a generalized terrestrial bird, with a short beak, long legs, and a long tail. It was probably not an especially adept flier. It was omnivorous and had a diet including seeds, fruits, and fish. The name of the type species, M. cristata, refers to the fact that it was initially interpreted as having a comb-like crest, but the existence of this crest has since been reinterpreted as unrelated plant material. One of its feathers had an iridescent coloration, but no chemical analysis has been done yet.

== Taxonomy ==
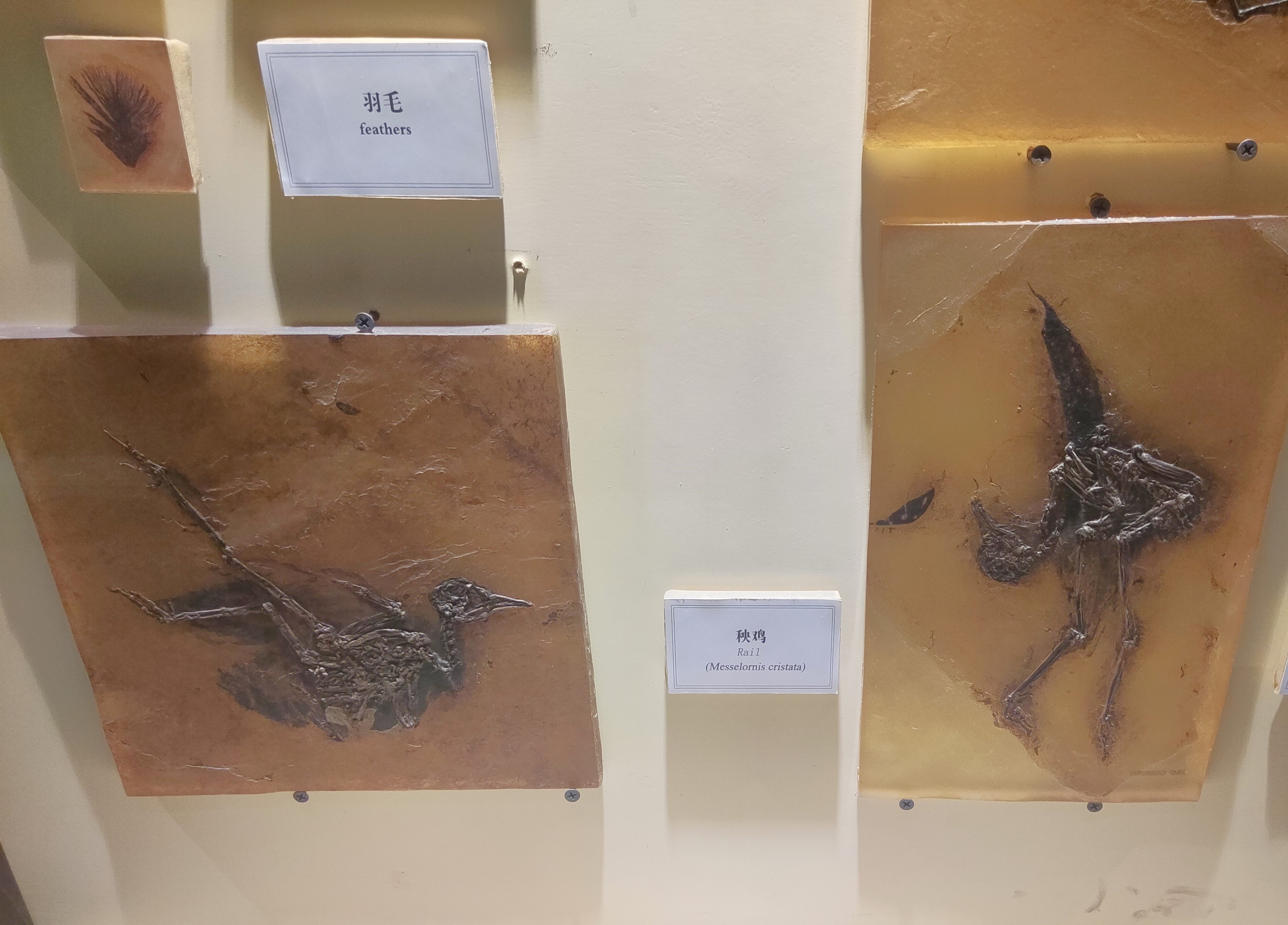
Fossil cast and feathers

Messelornis was originally interpreted as closely related to the sunbittern, which was also classified as a member of the Gruiformes at the time. However, the sunbittern has since been classified in a separate order, Eurypygiformes, while Messelornis has remained a member of the Gruiformes and is now interpreted as a relative of rails.

== Species ==
- M. cristata, which is the most well represented species of Messelornis due to its abundance within the Eocene Messel Pit from which its generic name refers. Specimens of M. cristata display a distinct range of sizes thought to be a result of sexual dimorphism. All known specimens of M. cristata are adults, implying that nesting sites were some distance away from the maar lakeshore of ancient Messel.
- M. nearctica, which is known from the Eocene Green River Formation. It is distinguished from M.cristata by its longer and more slender toes among other skeletal characteristics such as its unique hypotarsus morphology. Known specimens of M. nearctica exhibit a similar size range with M. cristata which has been hypothesized to also be the result of sexual dimorphism, but due to the comparative lack of specimens this remains unclear. Similarly, all known specimens of M. nearctica are adults as with M. cristata which may imply a similar nesting behavior away from the lakeshores of what would become the Green River Formation.
- M. russelli, which is known from the Paleocene of France and includes two humeri which are poorly preserved.

== See also ==
- Dinosaur coloration
- Paleofauna of the Messel Formation
- Paleobiota of the Green River Formation
