= Eophyllium =

Eophyllium Temporal range: Eocene

Scientific classification
- Domain: Eukaryota
- Kingdom: Animalia
- Phylum: Arthropoda
- Class: Insecta
- Order: Phasmatodea
- Family: Phylliidae
- Genus: †Eophyllium; Wedmann et al, 2007
- Species: †E. messelensis

Binomial name
- †Eophyllium messelensis Wedmann et al, 2007

Extinct genus of insects

Eophyllium is an extinct monotypic genus of the Phasmatodea, a type of insect ancestral to the modern Phylliidae. These insects mimic the shape of leaves for camouflage, with a single species, Eophyllium messelensis.

== Description ==
A full body fossil of E. messelensis was recovered from a 47-million-year-old fossil lake bed in Germany. The 60 mm long fossil has a body highly similar in shape to fossil leaves recovered from the same stratum.

The genitalia of the fossil are nearly identical to those of modern leaf insects, indicating the species has changed little over the millennia. One area in which E. messelensis differs from modern genera is in its front legs, which do not have flattened, leaf-like projections that modern leaf insects use to disguise their heads.
