= Eolacertidae =

Eolacertidae Temporal range: Paleocene–Eocene

Scientific classification
- Domain: Eukaryota
- Kingdom: Animalia
- Phylum: Chordata
- Class: Reptilia
- Order: Squamata
- Superfamily: Lacertoidea
- Family: †Eolacertidae; Čerňanskýa and Smith, 2017

Extinct family of lizards

Eolacertidae is an extinct family of lacertoid lizards known from the Paleocene and Eocene of Europe. They are the closest known relatives of Lacertidae.

== Genera ==
- Eolacerta Nöth, 1940 Conglomérat de Cernay, France, Paleocene, Tienen Formation, Belgium, Eocene, Lignites de Soissonnais, France, Eocene, Geiseltal, Messel Pit, Germany, Eocene
- Stefanikia Čerňanskýa and Smith, 2017 Messel Pit, Germany, Eocene
