= Stefanikia =

Stefanikia Temporal range: Lutetian

Scientific classification
- Kingdom: Animalia
- Phylum: Chordata
- Class: Reptilia
- Order: Squamata
- Family: †Eolacertidae
- Genus: †Stefanikia
- Species: †S. siderea

Binomial name
- †Stefanikia siderea Čerňanský and Smith, 2017

Extinct genus of eolacertid lizard

Stefanikia is an extinct monotypic genus of eolacertid lizard that lived in Europe during the Lutetian stage of the Eocene epoch.

== Etymology ==
The generic name Stefanikia honours Milan Rastislav Štefánik. The specific epithet of the type species, Stefanikia siderea, means stellar, in reference to Štefánik being an astronomer.
