= Protognathinus =

Protognathinus Temporal range: 49 Ma

Scientific classification
- Kingdom: Animalia
- Phylum: Arthropoda
- Clade: Pancrustacea
- Class: Insecta
- Order: Coleoptera
- Suborder: Polyphaga
- Infraorder: Scarabaeiformia
- Family: Lucanidae
- Subfamily: Lucaninae
- Tribe: Chiasognathini
- Genus: †Protognathinus; Chalumeau et al. 2001
- Species: †P. spielbergi

Binomial name
- †Protognathinus spielbergi Chalumeau et al. 2001

Extinct beetle genus

Protognathinus is an extinct genus of stag beetle from the Eocene of Europe, known from the Messel Pit in Germany. This genus is known from the single species P. spielbergi.

== Etymology ==
The specific name spielbergi refers to American film director Steven Spielberg, whose film Jurassic Park the authors considered to have contributed to the revival of interest in the earth's ancient past.

== Description ==
At 55 mm (2.2 inches) in total length, Protognathinus is one of the largest known fossil beetles in the superfamily Scarabaeoidea. It is comparable to other large fossil beetles such as Cheirotonus otai and Oryctoantiquus borealis. Like other beetle fossils known from the Messel Pit, Protognathinus fossils retain the color of the exoskeleton.

The details of the classification within the family are not well understood, and it is sometimes placed in Lampriminae and sometimes in Lucaninae. Morphological similarities with early Cretaceous species Litholamprima qizhihaoi, described from the Yixian Formation, have been pointed out.

== See also ==
- Maaradactylus spielbergi - a species of pterosaur named after Spielberg
