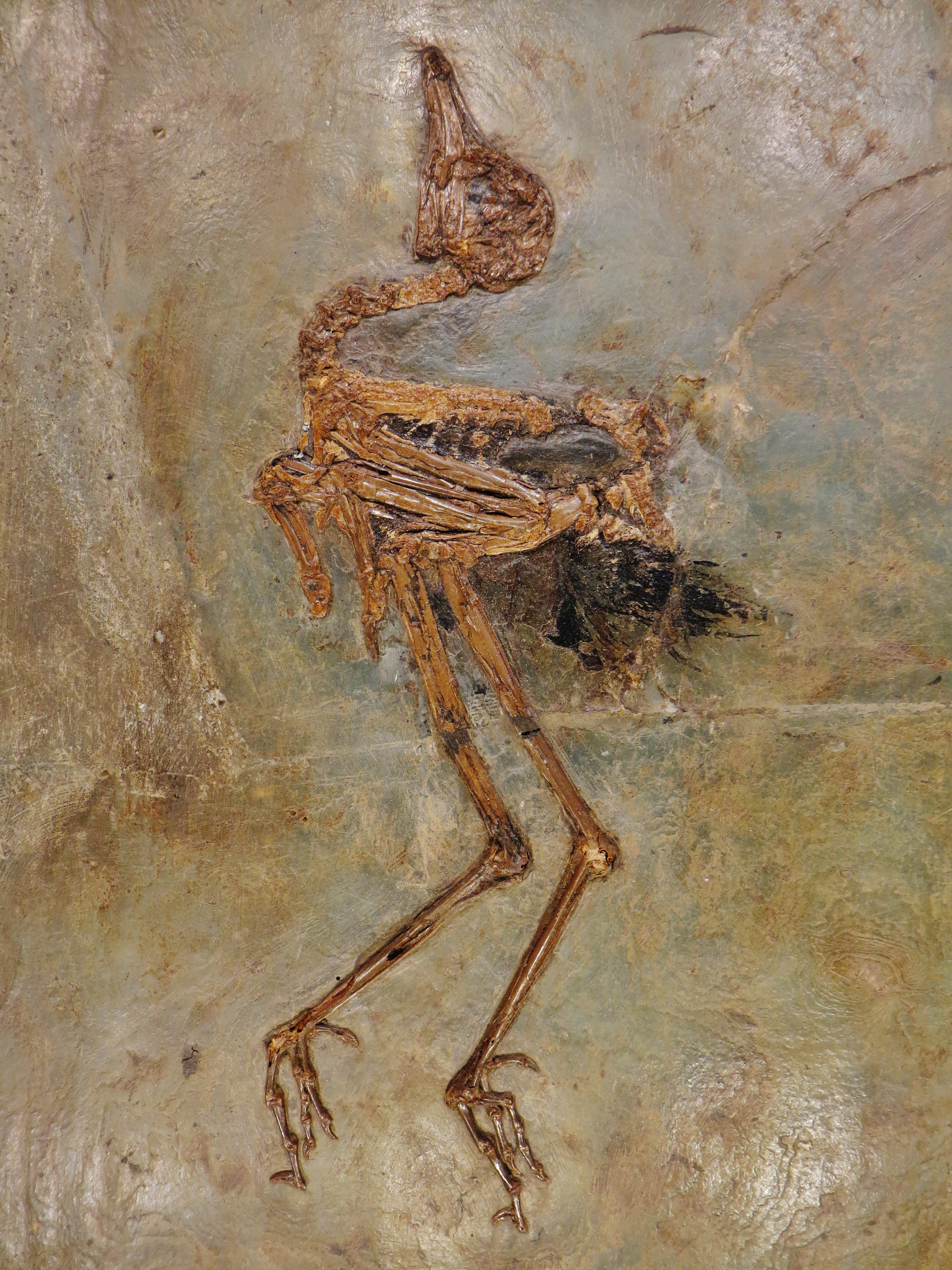
- Fossil specimen of Messelornis

Scientific classification
- Domain: Eukaryota
- Kingdom: Animalia
- Phylum: Chordata
- Class: Aves
- Order: Gruiformes
- Family: †Messelornithidae

Genera
- Itardiornis; Messelornis; Nasiornis; Parvirallus; Pellornis

= Messelornithidae =

Messelornithidae Temporal range: 61.7–48.6 Ma Paleocene - Early Oligocene

Extinct family of birds

Messelornithidae is an extinct clade of gruiform birds, closely related to modern rails. The fossil record are from the Paleocene to the early Oligocene of Europe and North America.
