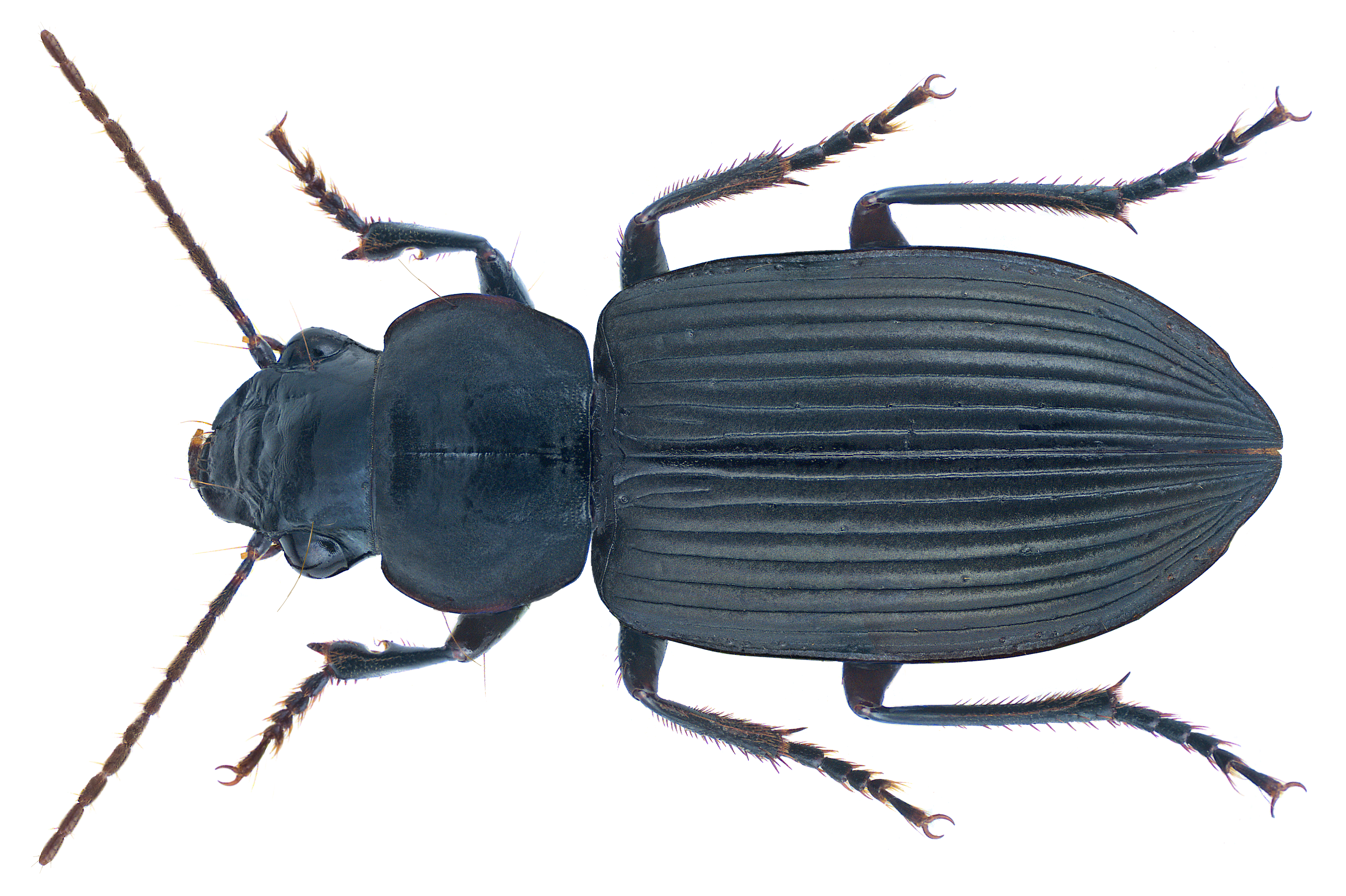
- Pseudognathaphanus punctilabris

Scientific classification
- Domain: Eukaryota
- Kingdom: Animalia
- Phylum: Arthropoda
- Class: Insecta
- Order: Coleoptera
- Suborder: Adephaga
- Family: Carabidae
- Subfamily: Harpalinae
- Tribe: Anisodactylini
- Genus: Pseudognathaphanus; Schauberger, 1932

= Pseudognathaphanus =

Genus of beetles

Pseudognathaphanus is a genus in the beetle family Carabidae. There are about 10 described species in Pseudognathaphanus.

== Species ==
These 10 species belong to the genus Pseudognathaphanus:

- Pseudognathaphanus dekkanus Andrewes, 1933 (India)
- Pseudognathaphanus dispellens (Walker, 1859) (Sri Lanka)
- Pseudognathaphanus exaratus (Bates, 1892) (India, Myanmar, Thailand, and Laos)
- Pseudognathaphanus festivus (Andrewes, 1920) (Myanmar, Thailand, Cambodia, and Vietnam)
- Pseudognathaphanus hiekei Kataev & Wrase, 2016 (Nepal)
- Pseudognathaphanus perrieri (Jeannel, 1948) (Madagascar)
- Pseudognathaphanus punctilabris (W.S.MacLeay, 1825) (China, Japan, Taiwan, Indomalaya)
- Pseudognathaphanus rufitactor (Bates, 1892) (China, Nepal, Myanmar, and Vietnam)
- Pseudognathaphanus rusticus (Andrewes, 1920) (Pakistan, Nepal, Sri Lanka, and India)
- Pseudognathaphanus zabroides (Alluaud, 1918) (Madagascar)
