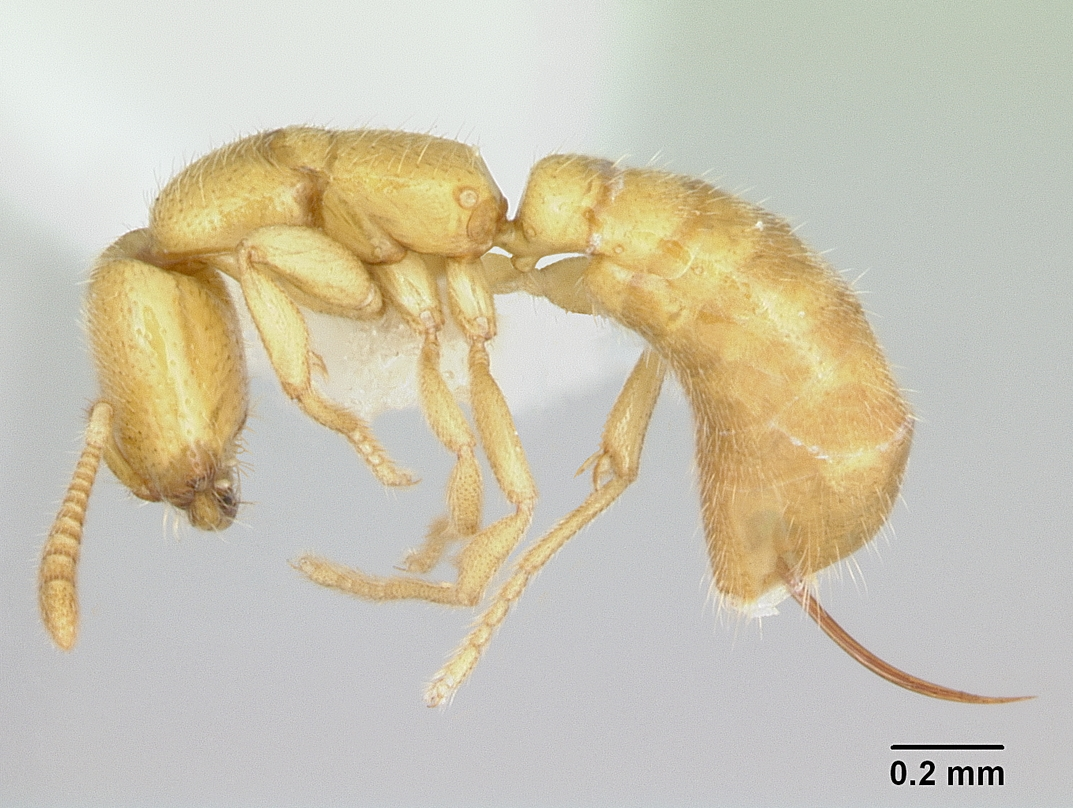
- Adetomyrma venatrix worker

Scientific classification
- Kingdom: Animalia
- Phylum: Arthropoda
- Class: Insecta
- Order: Hymenoptera
- Family: Formicidae
- Clade: Poneria
- Clade: Amblyoponomorpha
- Subfamily: Amblyoponinae; Forel, 1893
- Tribe: Amblyoponini; Forel, 1893

Type genus
- Amblyopone Erichson, 1842

Genera
- 9 extant genera; 1 fossil genus

= Amblyoponini =

Amblyoponini Temporal range: Lutetian - Recent

Subfamily of ants

Amblyoponini is the sole tribe of the ant subfamily Amblyoponinae containing 13 extant genera and one extinct genus. The ants in this subfamily are mostly specialized subterranean predators. Adult workers non-lethally pierce the integument of their larvae and pupae to imbibe haemolymph, earning them the common name Dracula ant.

== Identification ==
The subfamily is characterized by these worker characters: eyes small or absent, situated behind midlength of side of head; anterior margin of clypeus with specialized dentiform setae; promesonotal suture flexible; petiole very broadly attached to abdominal segment 3 and without a distinct posterior face; postpetiole absent; sting present and well developed.

== Systematics ==
The subfamily was formerly considered a tribe within Ponerinae, but was elevated to its own subfamily in 2003 when Barry Bolton divided Ponerinae into six subfamilies.

- Amblyoponinae Forel, 1893
  - Amblyoponini Forel, 1893
    - Adetomyrma Ward, 1994
    - Amblyopone Erichson, 1842
    - †Casaleia Pagliano & Scaramozzino, 1990
    - Fulakora Mann, 1919
    - Myopopone Roger, 1861
    - Mystrium Roger, 1862
    - Onychomyrmex Emery, 1895
    - Prionopelta Mayr, 1866
    - Stigmatomma Roger, 1859
    - Xymmer Santschi, 1914
