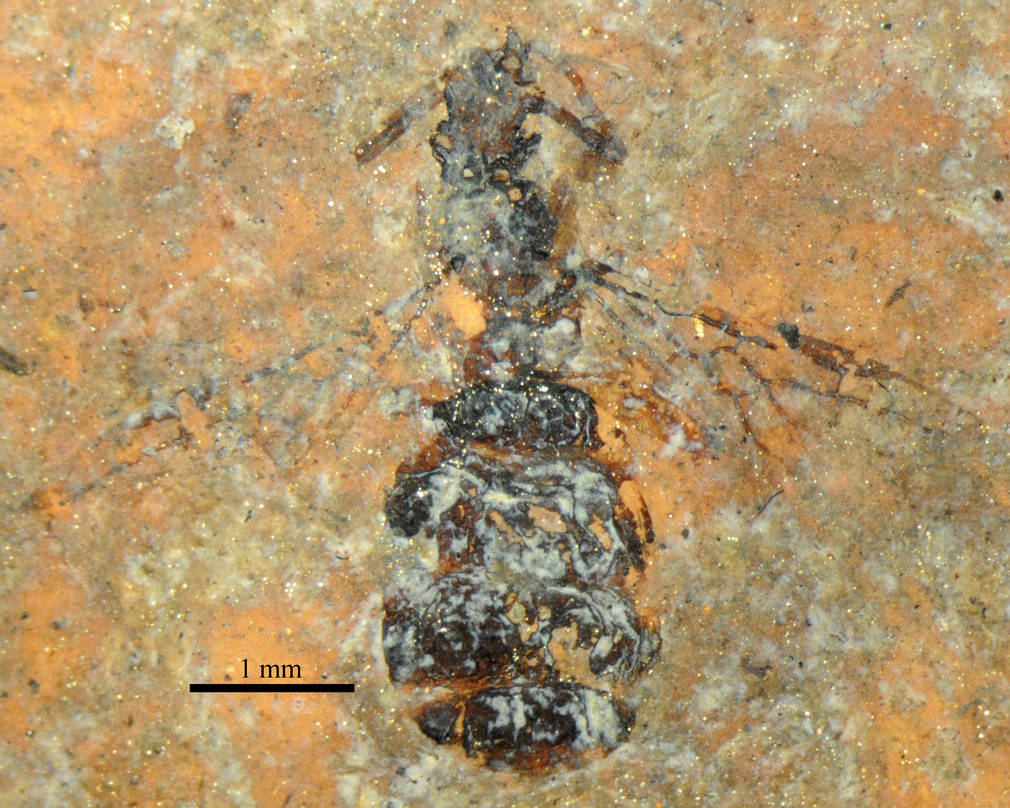
- C. eocenica holotype

Scientific classification
- Kingdom: Animalia
- Phylum: Arthropoda
- Clade: Pancrustacea
- Class: Insecta
- Order: Hymenoptera
- Family: Formicidae
- Subfamily: Amblyoponinae
- Tribe: Amblyoponini
- Genus: †Casaleia; Pagliano & Scaramozzino, 1990

Type species
- Protamblyopone inversa Dlussky, 1981

Species
- C. eocenica Dlussky & Wedmann, 2012; C. inversa (Dlussky, 1981); C. longiventris (Heer, 1849); C. orientalis Dlussky et al,, 2015

Synonyms
- Protamblyopone Dlussky, 1981

= Casaleia =

Casaleia Temporal range: Lutetian-Serravallian

Genus of ants

Casaleia is an extinct genus of ants in the formicid subfamily Amblyoponinae described by Pagliano & Scaramozzino in 1990 from fossils found in Europe. The genus contains four species dating from the Eocene to Miocene, Casaleia eocenica, Casaleia inversa, Casaleia longiventris, Casaleia orientalis.

== History and classification ==
The species placed in Casaleia have a varied history, with the type species Casaleia inversa originally described by Gennady Dlussky in 1981 as "Protamblyopone" inversa. The fossil was recovered from Middle Miocene age sediments exposed in the Chon-Tyz mine, Naryn Region, Kyrgyzstan. However "Protamblyopone" was already used by William Morton Wheeler as a subgenus of Amblyopone. To correct the homonym status, the species was moved to the new genus Casaleia by Pagliano and Scaramozzino in a 1990 paper.

The second species in the genus, C. eocenica, is of Lutetian age, and was recovered as a solitary compression-impression fossil preserved in a layer of soft sedimentary rock. Along with other well preserved insect fossils, the C. eocenica specimen was collected from layers of the Lutetian Messel pit World Heritage Site. The formation is composed of brown coals, oil shales, and bituminous shale, which preserved numerous insects, fish, birds, reptiles, and terrestrial mammals as a notable lagerstätten. The area is a preserved maar lake which initially formed approximately 47 million years ago as the result of volcanic explosions. The fossil was described by Dlussky and Sonja Wedmann in a 2012 paper on the poneromorph ants of Messel. The specific epithet "eocenica" is derived from the Eocene age of the fossil. At the time of description, the fossil was preserved in the collections of the Forschungsstation Grube Messel as number FIS MeI 5565.

C. longiventris was originally described 132 years before C. inversa and the erection of a new genus for the species. The species was based on a group of seven separate fossil ants, which were preserved as compression fossils in sedimentary rock from the Radoboj area of what is now Croatia. The deposits are the result of sedimentation in an inland sea basin, possibly a shallow lagoon environment, during the Burdigalian of the Early Miocene. The fossil impressions are preserved in micrite limestones, resulting in low quality preservation of fine details. The fossils were first studied by Oswald Heer, then a professor with the University of Zürich, who placed the fossils into the genus Formica as F. longiventris in 1849. This placement was not changed until a re-examination of two of Heers type specimens was published in 2014. Examination by Dlussky and Putyatina of two of Heers "syntypes" resulted in the removal of the species from Formica and placement into Casaleia. Of the two specimens, one was designated lectotype for the species, while the second was determined not to belong to the genus.

C. orientalis was described in 2015 from a single holotype gyne missing its head. The fossil was recovered from the late Eocene Bol’shaya Svetlovodnaya fossil site, in the Sikhote-Alin area of far-eastern Russia. The type specimen numbered PIN 3429/1174 is currently preserved in the A.A. Borissiak Paleontological Institute fossil collections of the Russian Academy of Sciences. The Bol’shaya Svetlovodnaya site preserves diatomaceous sediments from a small lake which existed near an active volcanic center. The diatomites have been grouped as either the Maksimovka formation or Salibez Formation, and the age range for the fossils is varied, ranging from upper Eocene to Upper Oligocene. Dlussky, Rasnitsyn, and Perfilieva opted to treat the fossil age as that of probably Priabonian. They coined the specific epithet from the Latin "orientalis", meaning "eastern", in reference to the type locality.

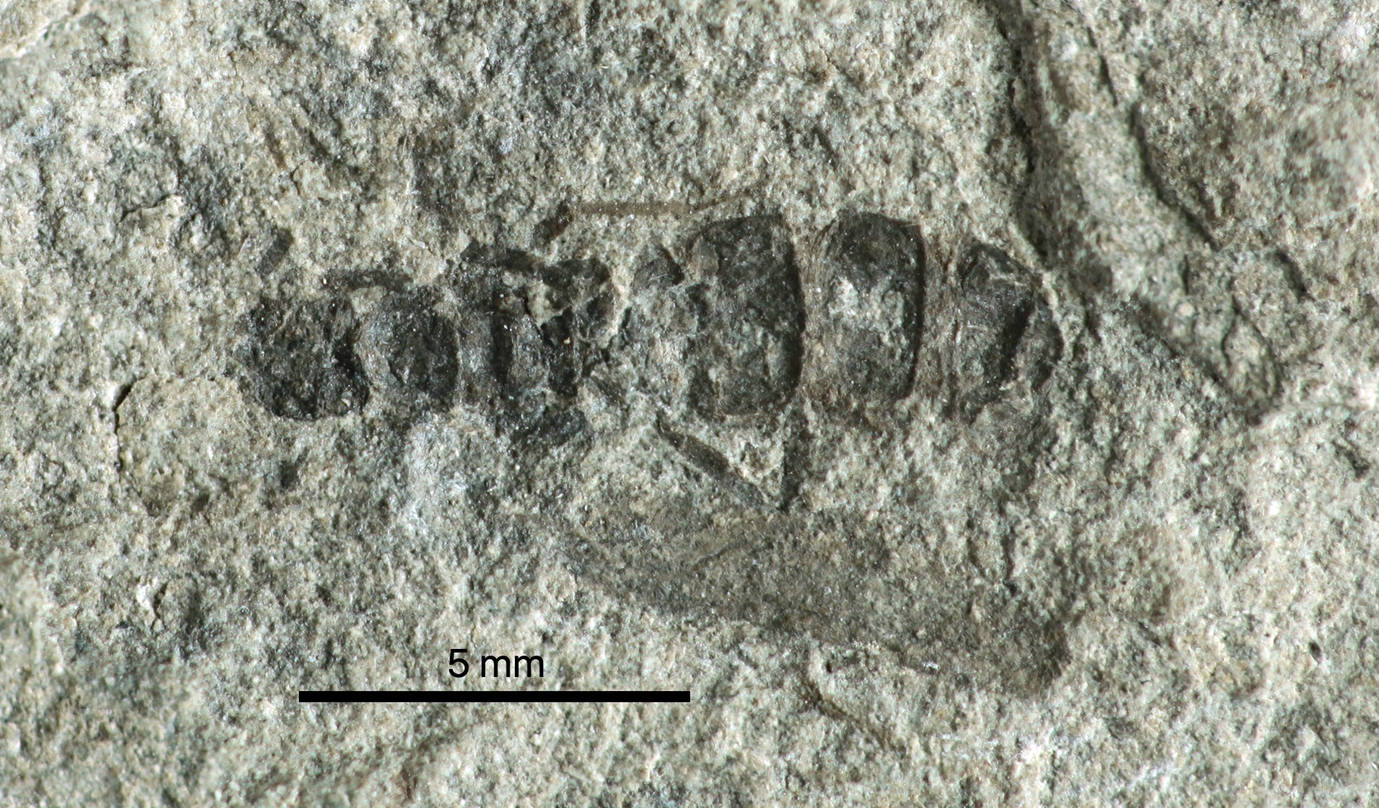
C. longiventris lectotype

== Description ==
In all three species the broad abdomen rests against the thorax with a single node petiole connecting. The eyes are sometimes not present on worker caste individuals, but in all castes where they are present they are placed just behind the mid length of the head capsule. In the known gynes the antennae are twelve segments and geniculate in structure, while the mandibles are triangular.

=== C. eocenica ===
The type fossil for C. eocenica is a winged female gyne that was preserved as a dorsal imprint in the matrix. Overall the body length as preserved is 4.9 mm (0.19 in) with fore-wings that are 3.2 mm (0.13 in) long. The eyes are placed nearly at the midpoint of the head which is a little longer than its width. The antennae differ from C. inversa by having a scape which extends beyond the back corner of the head. The fore-wings have a vein structure that has resulted in closed cells 1 + 2r, 3r, rm and mcu.

=== C. inversa ===
C. inversa is medium length for the genus, being 6.5 mm (0.26 in).

=== C. longiventris ===
The largest of the species, C. longiventris has a body length of 10 mm (0.39 in), and a hind-wing length of 6.4 mm (0.25 in). The mesosoma is elongated compared to the other two species and additionally separating the three. Neither the antennae or the fore-wings are preserved on the single examined lectotype.

=== C. orientalis ===
The single fossil is incomplete, but estimates give the length of 5.0 millimetres (0.20 in). The front are of the mesosoma has a convex outline in profile. Due to the preservation positioning of the gyne, comparison to the other species was not possible.
