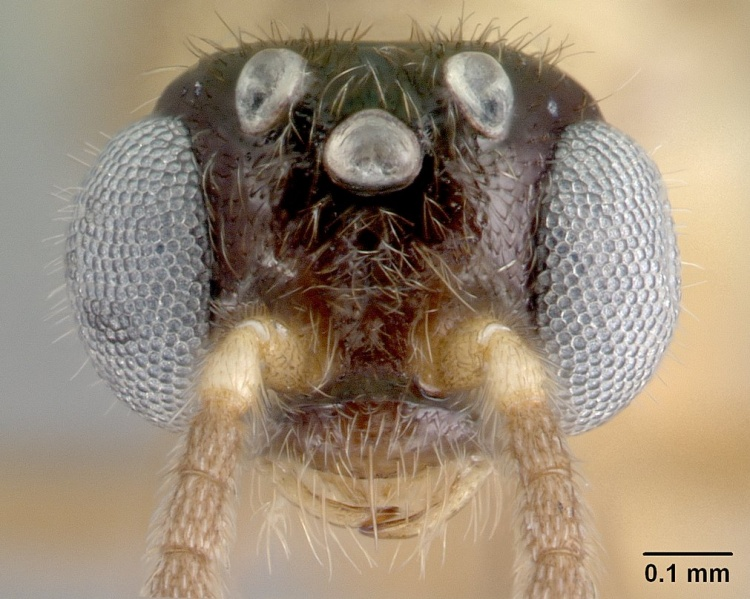

Scientific classification
- Kingdom: Animalia
- Phylum: Arthropoda
- Class: Insecta
- Order: Hymenoptera
- Family: Formicidae
- Genus: Adetomyrma
- Species: A. aureocuprea

Binomial name
- Adetomyrma aureocuprea Yoshimura & Fisher, 2012

= Adetomyrma aureocuprea =

Species of ant

Adetomyrma aureocuprea (from Latin aureus, "golden" and cupreus "coppery", referring to the body coloration) is a species of ant endemic to Madagascar.

== Description ==
Adetomyrma aureocuprea, only known from males, is easily separable from the other Adetomyrma males by the yellowish body color, no mesoscutal notaulus, poorly developed subpetiolar process, lack of posterodorsal projection or lobe on the paramere, short hairs on the compound eye, and vestigial parapsidal line.

The males of Adetomyrma aureocuprea display remarkable morphological variation in, for example, the size of the eye and ocelli, head shape, mesonotal shape, petiolar shape, and hairs on body surface.

== Sympatry ==
A. aureocuprea is completely sympatric with A. bressleri, A. caputleae, A. goblin, and A. venatrix, and has been collected within a 20 km radius of A. cilium and within a 70 km radius of A. caudapinniger. The morphological differences between all species are clear and consistent in each case of sympatric and geographically close localities, even though apparent similarity may be shown to a character of another Adetomyrma species collected from distant localities. In addition to the above species, the distribution of A. aureocuprea is parapatric with A. clarivida. Separation between A. aureocuprea and A. clarivida is strongly supported by the morphological differences observed in the aedeagus.
