= Đông Thái village =

Đông Thái
- Location of in Vietnam
- Coordinates: 18°32′04″N 105°33′54″E
- Country: Vietnam
- Province: Hà Tĩnh
- District: Đức Thọ

Đông Thái is a village in Đức Thọ District, Hà Tĩnh Province in Vietnam. It is notable for being the home village of Phan Đình Phùng, the most notable Vietnamese anti-colonial leader of the 19th century. It was also the home village of Hoàng Cao Khải, who was the viceroy of Tonkin (northern Vietnam) during the French colonial era. Khai fought to have Phan captured.
