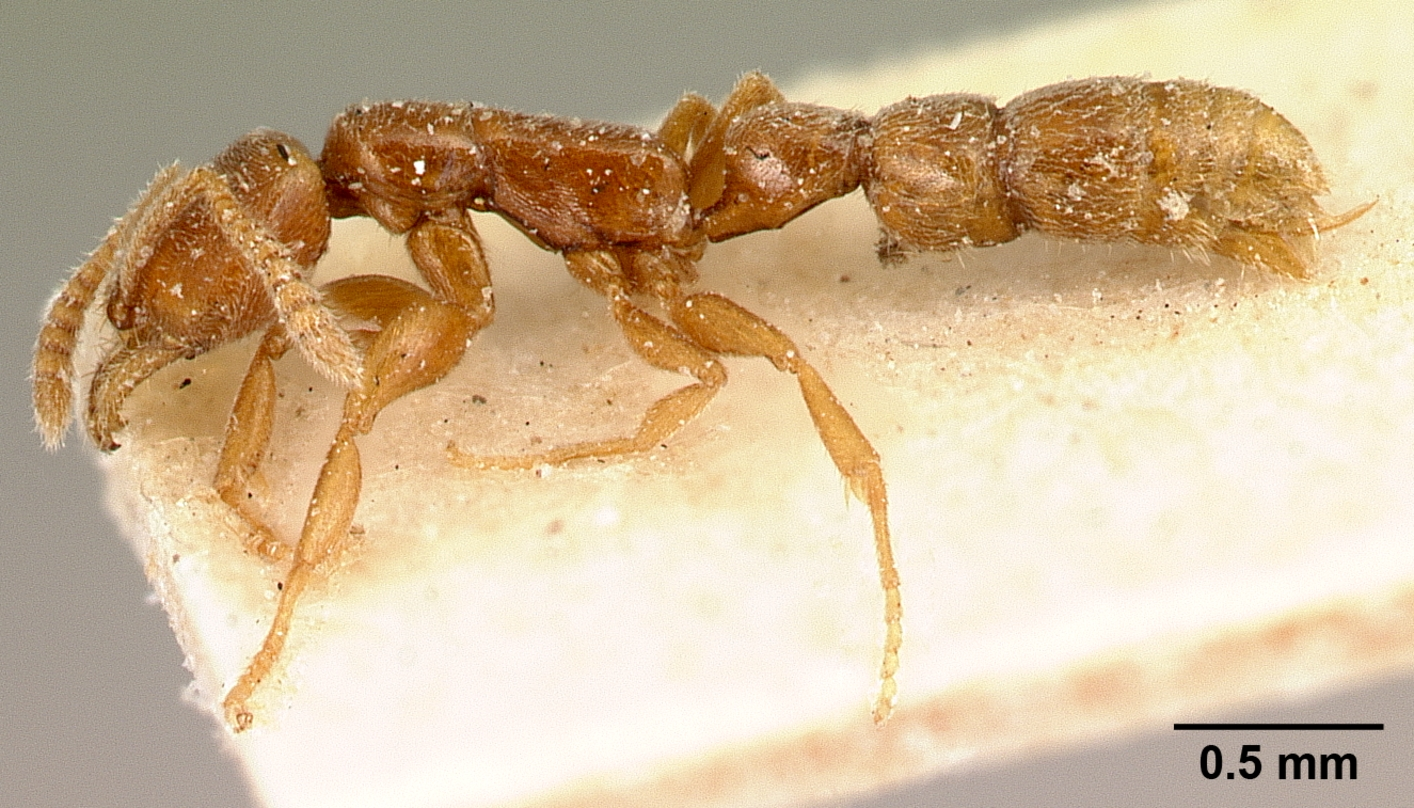
- Worker specimen of X. muticus

Scientific classification
- Kingdom: Animalia
- Phylum: Arthropoda
- Class: Insecta
- Order: Hymenoptera
- Family: Formicidae
- Subfamily: Amblyoponinae
- Tribe: Amblyoponini
- Genus: Xymmer; Santschi, 1914

= Xymmer =

Genus of ants

Xymmer is a genus of ant in the subfamily Amblyoponinae containing the three species: Xymmer muticus, Xymmer phungi, and Xymmer paniscus.

== Taxonomy ==
Xymmer was first described by Felix Santschi in 1914 as a monotypic subgeneric taxon under Stigmatomma. Since Santschi's original description, Xymmer was raised to genus by Wheeler (1922) in his identification key for African Amblyoponini. Clark (1934) regarded Xymmer as a subgenus in Amblyopone following Wheeler's suggestion; however, distinguishing characters were not discussed in their treatments. Brown (1949, 1960) discussed separable characters for Xymmer (as a junior synonym under the subgenus Stigmatomma) for the first time since Santschi's original description. Brown regarded Stigmatomma and its related names as junior synonyms of Amblyopone at that time. Xymmer was resurrected to its current placement as an independent genus from synonymy with Amblyopone based on a morphological examination by Yoshimura & Fisher (2012).
