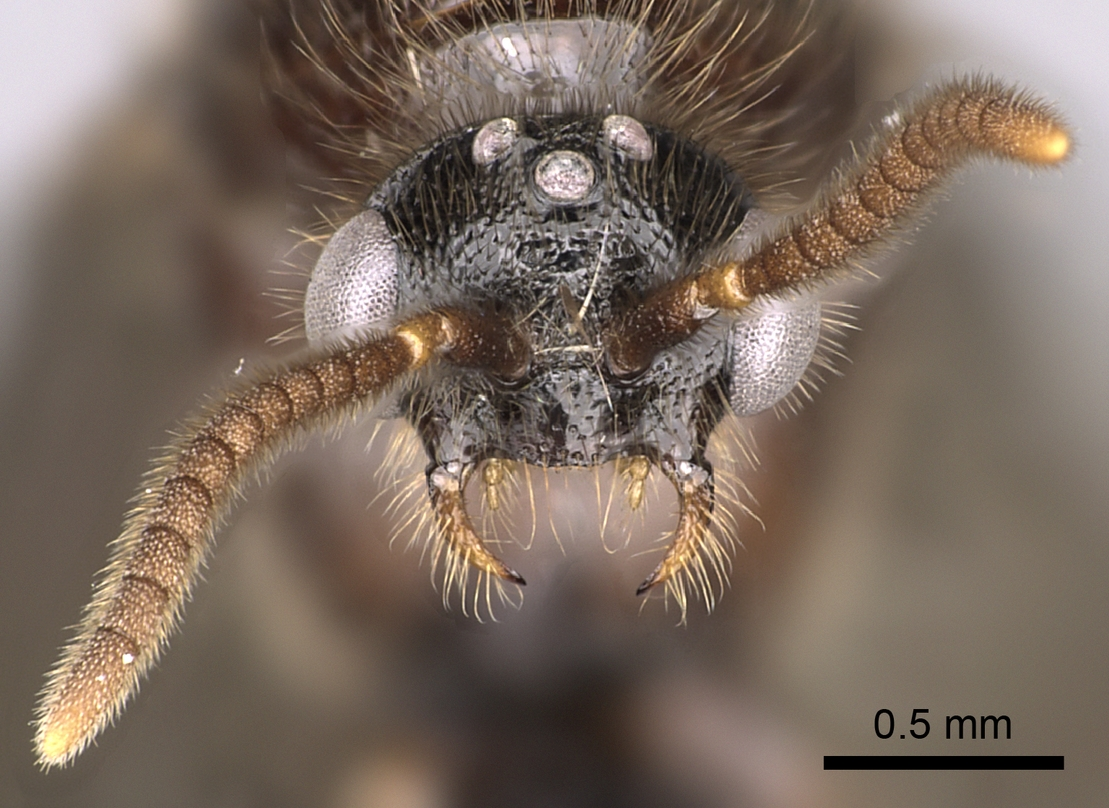

Scientific classification
- Kingdom: Animalia
- Phylum: Arthropoda
- Class: Insecta
- Order: Hymenoptera
- Family: Formicidae
- Genus: Adetomyrma
- Species: A. cassis

Binomial name
- Adetomyrma cassis Yoshimura & Fisher, 2012

= Adetomyrma cassis =

Species of ant

Adetomyrma cassis (from Latin cassis, "helm", referring to the shape of its genital capsule) is a species of ant endemic to Madagascar.

== Description ==
Adetomyrma cassis is only known from a single male collected in the Ambatovaky Reserve, Madagascar. The male of A. cassis is distinguished easily from other Adetomyrma males by a distinct and flatted projection on the posterior portion of the paramere. This projection is not separated from the paramere by a deep notch as in A. bressleri. This genital character observed in Adetomyrma cassis is completely unique and sufficient to regard this male as a distinct species.
