= Stigmatomma groehni =

Stigmatomma groehni Temporal range: Middle to Late Eocene Baltic amber

Scientific classification
- Kingdom: Animalia
- Phylum: Arthropoda
- Class: Insecta
- Order: Hymenoptera
- Family: Formicidae
- Genus: Stigmatomma
- Species: †S. groehni

Binomial name
- †Stigmatomma groehni (Dlussky, 2009)

Extinct species of ant

Stigmatomma groehni is an extinct species of ant in the genus Stigmatomma. It was described by Dlussky in 2009, where it was found in the Baltic Amber, alongside another extinct species Stigmatomma electrinum.
