= Fulakora =

Scientific classification
- Kingdom: Animalia
- Phylum: Arthropoda
- Clade: Pancrustacea
- Class: Insecta
- Order: Hymenoptera
- Family: Formicidae
- Subfamily: Amblyoponinae
- Tribe: Amblyoponini
- Genus: Fulakora; Mann, 1919

Type species
- Fulakora celata (Mann, 1919)

Diversity
- 26 species

Synonyms
- Ericapelta Kusnezov, 1955; Paraprionopelta Kusnezov 1955

Genus of ants

Fulakora is a genus of ants in the subfamily Amblyoponinae. The genus has a worldwide distribution, and like most other amblyoponines, Fulakora species are specialized predators. It was originally described as, and for a long time considered to be, a subgenus of Stigmatomma until it was elevated to an independent genus by Ward & Fisher (2016).

== Species ==
As of 2026, Fulakora contains 26 valid species, all extant.

- Fulakora agostii (Lacau & Delabie, 2002)
- Fulakora armigera (Mayr, 1887)
- Fulakora bierigi (Santschi, 1930)
- Fulakora celata (Mann, 1919)
- Fulakora chilensis (Mayr, 1887)
- Fulakora cleae (Lacau & Delabie, 2002)
- Fulakora degenerata (Borgmeier, 1957)
- Fulakora egregia (Kusnezov, 1955)
- Fulakora elongata (Santschi, 1912)
- Fulakora estevae Jacintho & Chaul, 2025
- Fulakora exigua (Clark, 1928)
- Fulakora falcata (Lattke, 1991)
- Fulakora gnoma (Taylor, 1979)
- Fulakora gracilis (Clark, 1934)
- Fulakora heraldoi (Lacau & Delabie, 2002)
- Fulakora lucida (Clark, 1934)
- Fulakora lurilabes (Lattke, 1991)
- Fulakora minima (Kusnezov, 1955)
- Fulakora monrosi (Brown, 1960)
- Fulakora mystriops (Brown, 1960)
- Fulakora orizabana (Brown, 1960)
- Fulakora papuana (Taylor, 1979)
- Fulakora punctulata (Clark, 1934)
- Fulakora saundersi (Forel, 1892)
- Fulakora smithi (Brown, 1960)
- Fulakora wilsoni (Clark, 1928)
