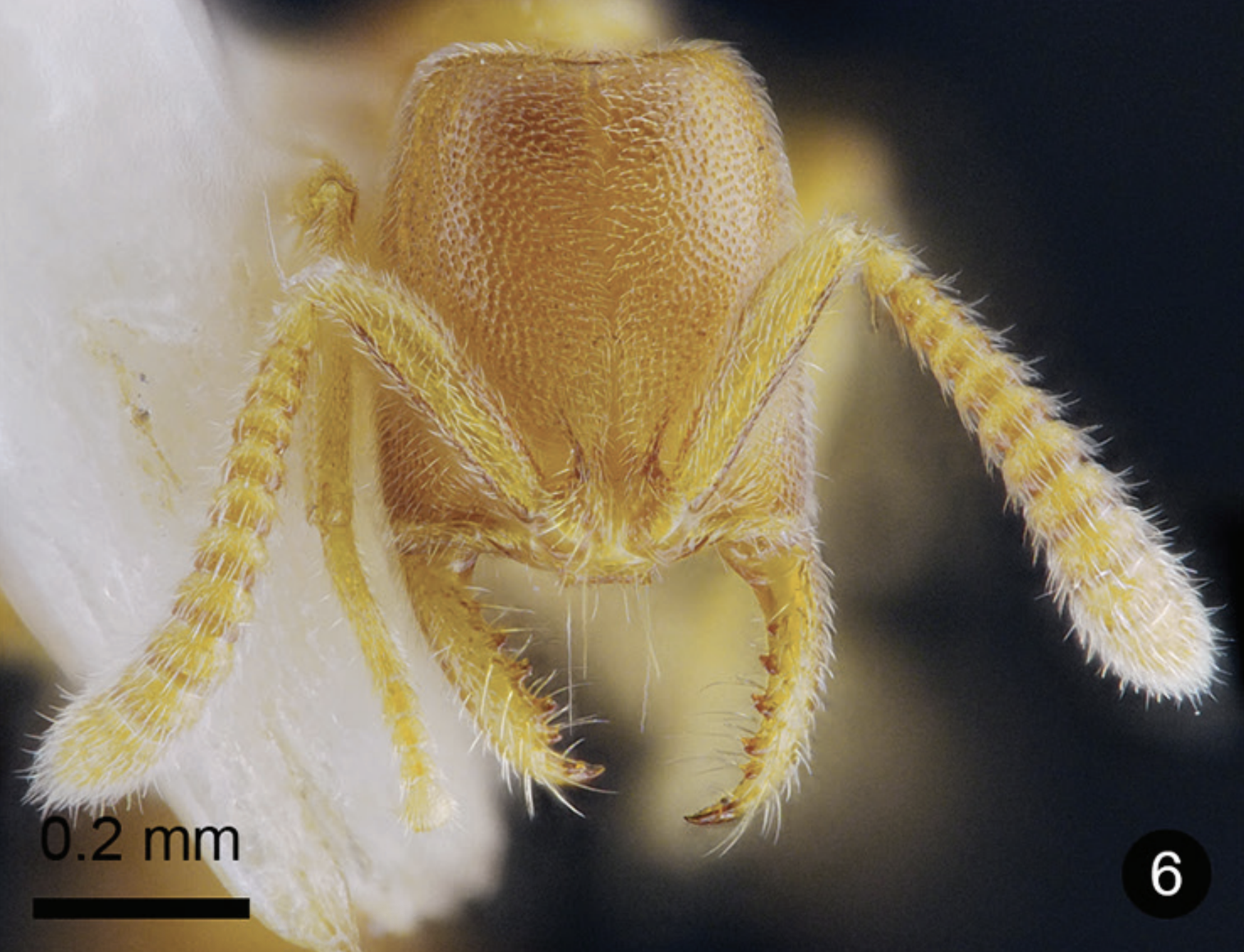
- A worker ant specimen's head

Scientific classification
- Kingdom: Animalia
- Phylum: Arthropoda
- Clade: Pancrustacea
- Class: Insecta
- Order: Hymenoptera
- Family: Formicidae
- Genus: Xymmer
- Species: X. phungi

Binomial name
- Xymmer phungi (Satria et al., 2016)

= Xymmer phungi =

Species of ant from Southeast Asia

Xymmer phungi is a species of ant distributed in Southeast Asia. Part of the genus Xymmer, the species was first discovered in Vietnam in 2007, and was officially described as a species in 2016. Named after Vietnamese leader Phan Dinh Phung, it is the first Oriental species of the genus, notable for a clypeal lobe one-sixth as long as it is broad.

== Taxonomy ==
Xymmer phungi is one of only three species in the genus Xymmer.‍ It is the first Oriental species in the genus, in which undescribed species had only been found in the West African region until its discovery. It was first discovered in Nui Chua National Park, southern Central Vietnam, in 2007; however, the specimen was partially destroyed, leading it to being tentatively labeled Stigmatomma sp. eg-4.‍

In March 2015, a colony of the species was collected in northern central Vietnam,‍ and described as an official species in 2016 by Satria et al.‍ The species is named in honour of Phan Dinh Phung, a Vietnamese revolutionary leader born in 1847 in Ha Tinh Province, who led uprisings against French colonial rule.‍

== Distribution ==
The species is found in Southeast Asia.‍ They have been found in the countries of Thailand (specifically Chachoengsao Province)‍ and Vietnam.‍

== Description ==
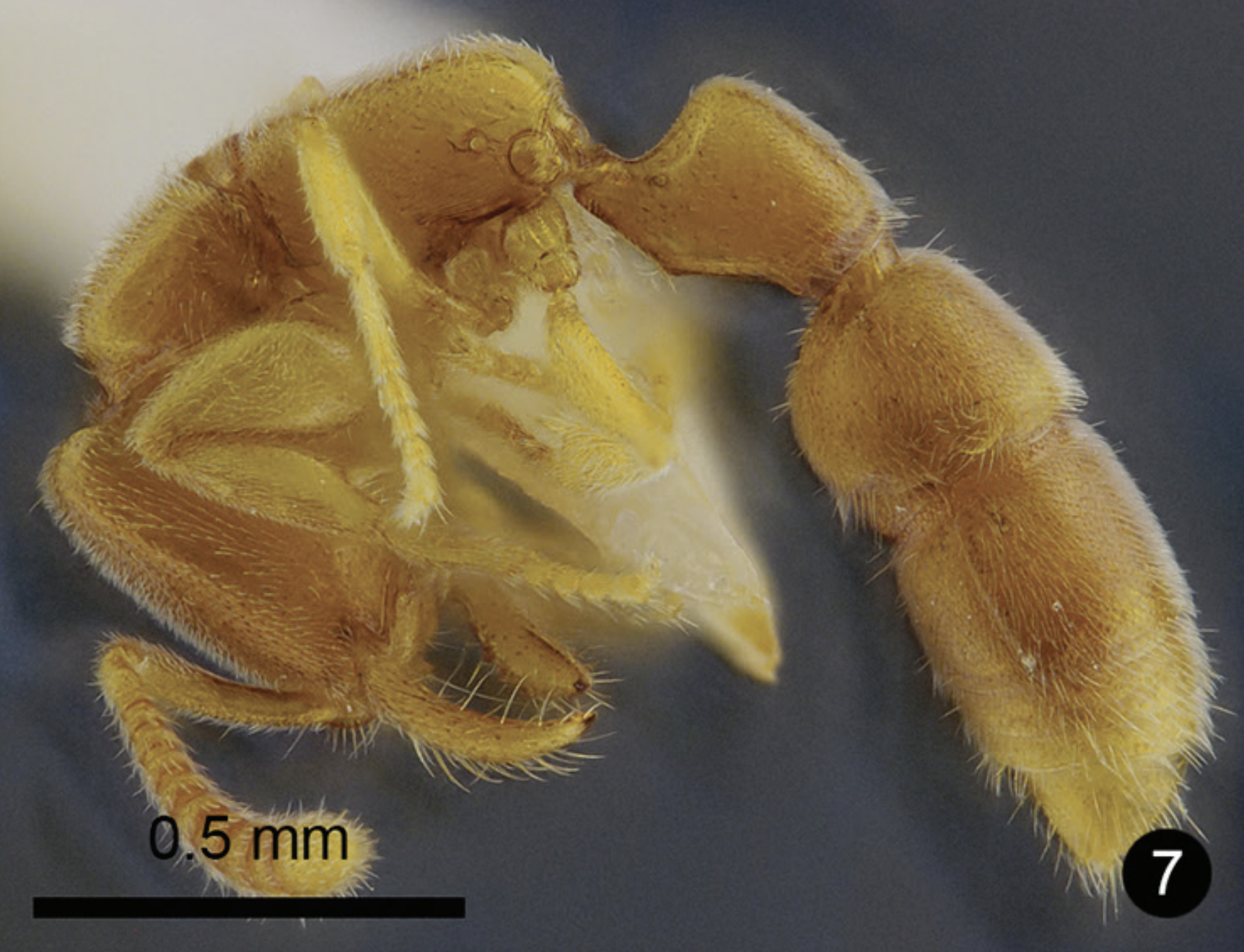
The body of a Xymmer phungi worker ant

The worker ant of the species is morphologically similar to Xymmer muticus; however, it is distinguished from the latter by a clypeal lobe one-sixth times as long as broad, and the weak conclave of the anterior margin of the lobe.‍ In the dorsal view, the species' mesonotum is semi-circular in shape.‍ Worker ants of this species are monomorphic,‍ (Note: having a single form or phenotype) with a subrectangular head that is flattened from top to bottom and lacks eyes. The clypeus forms a short rectangular lobe with a weakly concave front margin, while the mandibles are elongated with several pointed teeth. The antennae are 12-segmented, with a flattened scape and an apical segment that is long and bluntly-pointed.‍

The mesosoma is weakly convex, with a flexible promesonotal suture, no spines on the propodeum, and a rounded propodeal‍ (Note: on the propodeum) lobe. The legs lack spurs on the mid-tibia, while the hind tibia bears one reduced spur and one well-developed pectinate spur. The petiole is distinctly separated from the mesosoma. The head is densely sculptured with hair pits, though a smooth band runs across the vertex and part of the frons. The thorax and propodeum show weaker sculpturing, while the petiole and gaster are more densely sculptured. The body is covered in short, appressed hairs, with longer setae present on the clypeus, mandibles, petiole, and gaster tip. The overall coloration is light brown, with paler yellowish antennae and legs.‍

== See also ==
- List of organisms named after famous people (born 1800–1899)
