= Hoàng Cao Khải =

Viceroy of Tonkin (1850–1933)

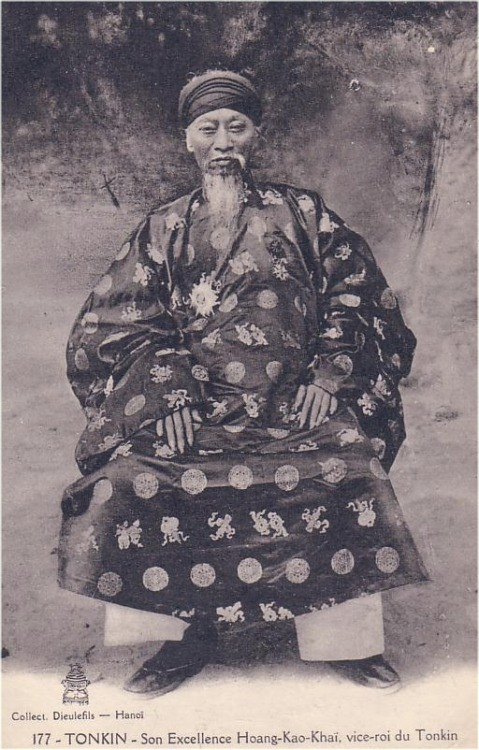
Hoàng Cao Khải

Hoàng Cao Khải (Vietnamese: [hwâːŋ kāːw xa᷉ːj], 黃高啟; 1850, in Đức Thọ District – 1933) was a viceroy of Tonkin (locally known as Bắc Kỳ), the northernmost of the three parts of Vietnam under French colonial rule. He is best known for his role in helping the French authorities to hunt down Phan Đình Phùng, the leading Vietnamese revolutionary of the time.
