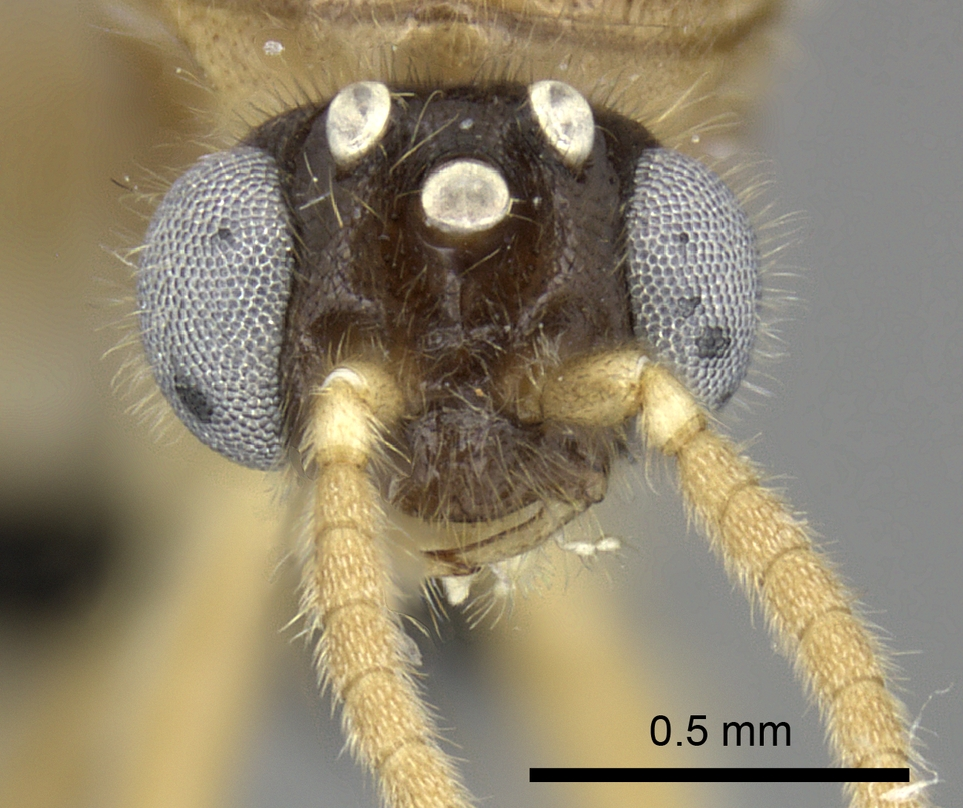

Scientific classification
- Kingdom: Animalia
- Phylum: Arthropoda
- Class: Insecta
- Order: Hymenoptera
- Family: Formicidae
- Genus: Adetomyrma
- Species: A. cilium

Binomial name
- Adetomyrma cilium Yoshimura & Fisher, 2012

= Adetomyrma cilium =

Species of ant

Adetomyrma cilium (from Latin cilium, "eyelash", referring to the long hairs on its compound eye) is a species of ant endemic to Madagascar.

== Description ==
Adetomyrma cilium is only known from males. The male of A. cilium is distinguished easily from the other Adetomyrma males by a combination of long hairs on the eye, long suberect hairs on the anterior surface of the mesofemur, and a well-developed subpetiolar process.

The species is relatively similar to A. clarivida, but differs in the mesofemur hairs and development of the subpetiolar process. Additionally, these species differ in the shape of the aedeagus and the palpal formula.
