= Đức Thọ district =

Coordinates: 18.5333°N 105.5976°E

Đức Thọ district Huyện Đức Thọ
- District
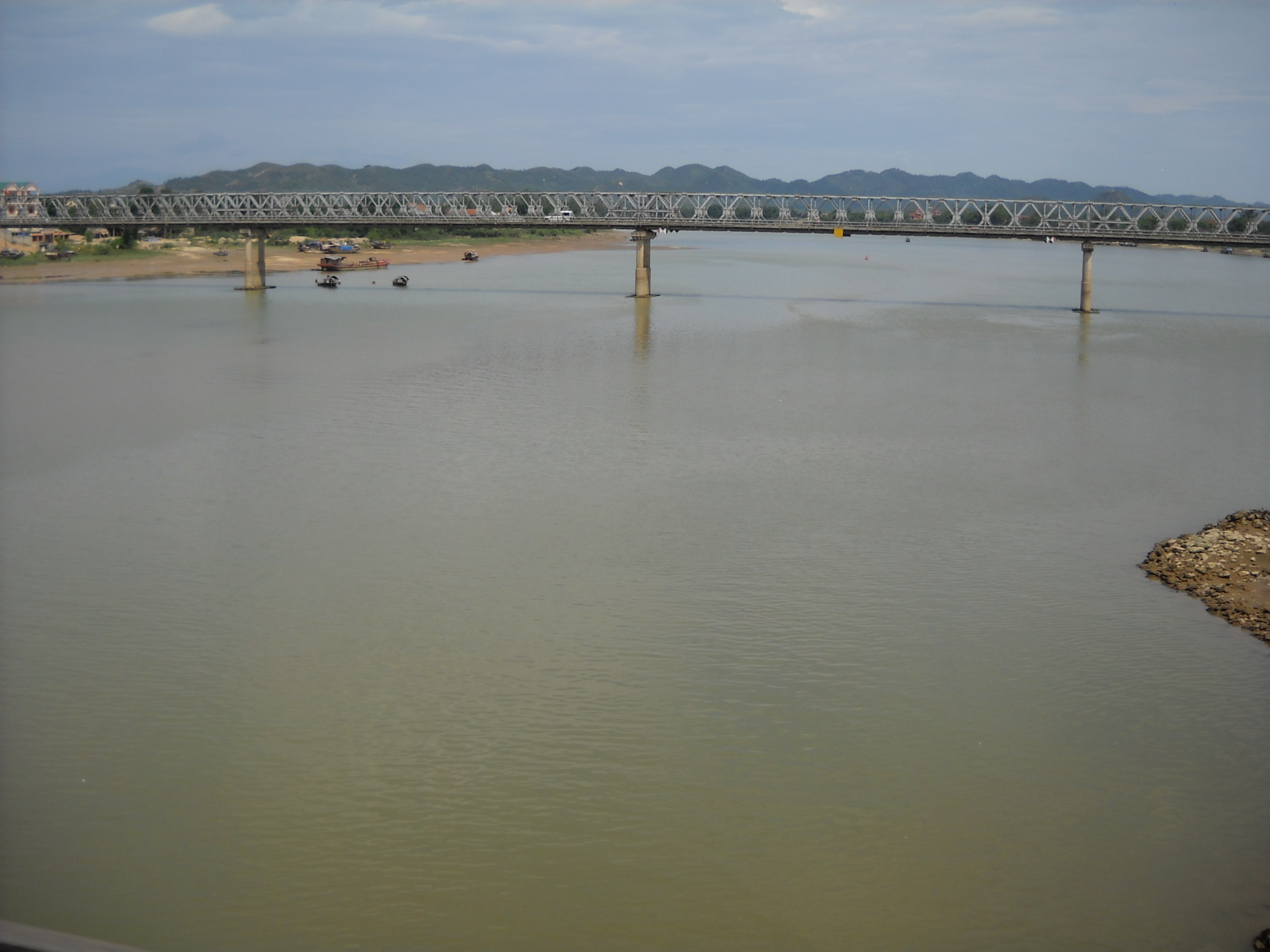
- Bridge over the La river

- Seal
- Interactive map of Đức Thọ district
- Country: Vietnam
- Region: North Central Coast
- Province: Hà Tĩnh
- Capital: Đức Thọ

Area
  - Total: 78 sq mi (203 km^{2})

Population (2003)
  - Total: 117,730
- Time zone: UTC+07:00 (Indochina Time)

Đức Thọ is a former rural district of Hà Tĩnh province in the North Central Coast region of Vietnam. The village of Đông Thái, where the noted 19th-century anti-colonial leader Phan Đình Phùng was born, is located in Đức Thọ. As of 2003 the district had a population of 117,730. The district covers an area of 203 km^{2} (78 sq mi). The district capital lies at Đức Thọ.
