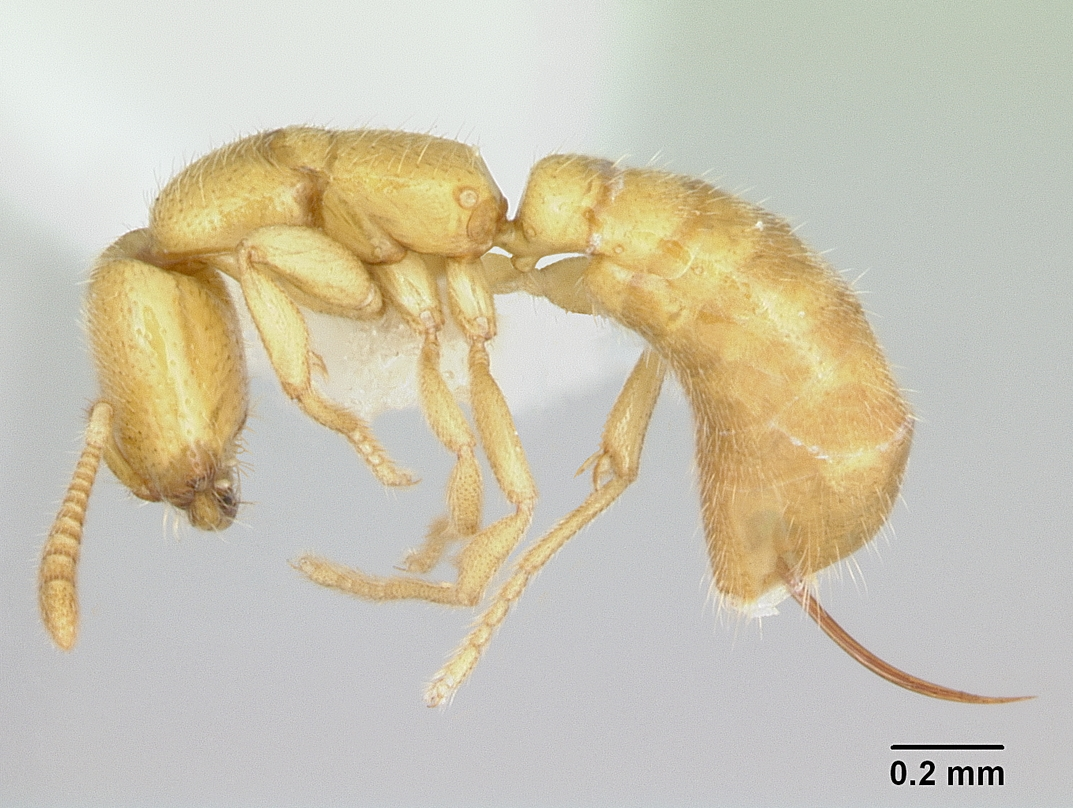
- A blind A. venatrix worker
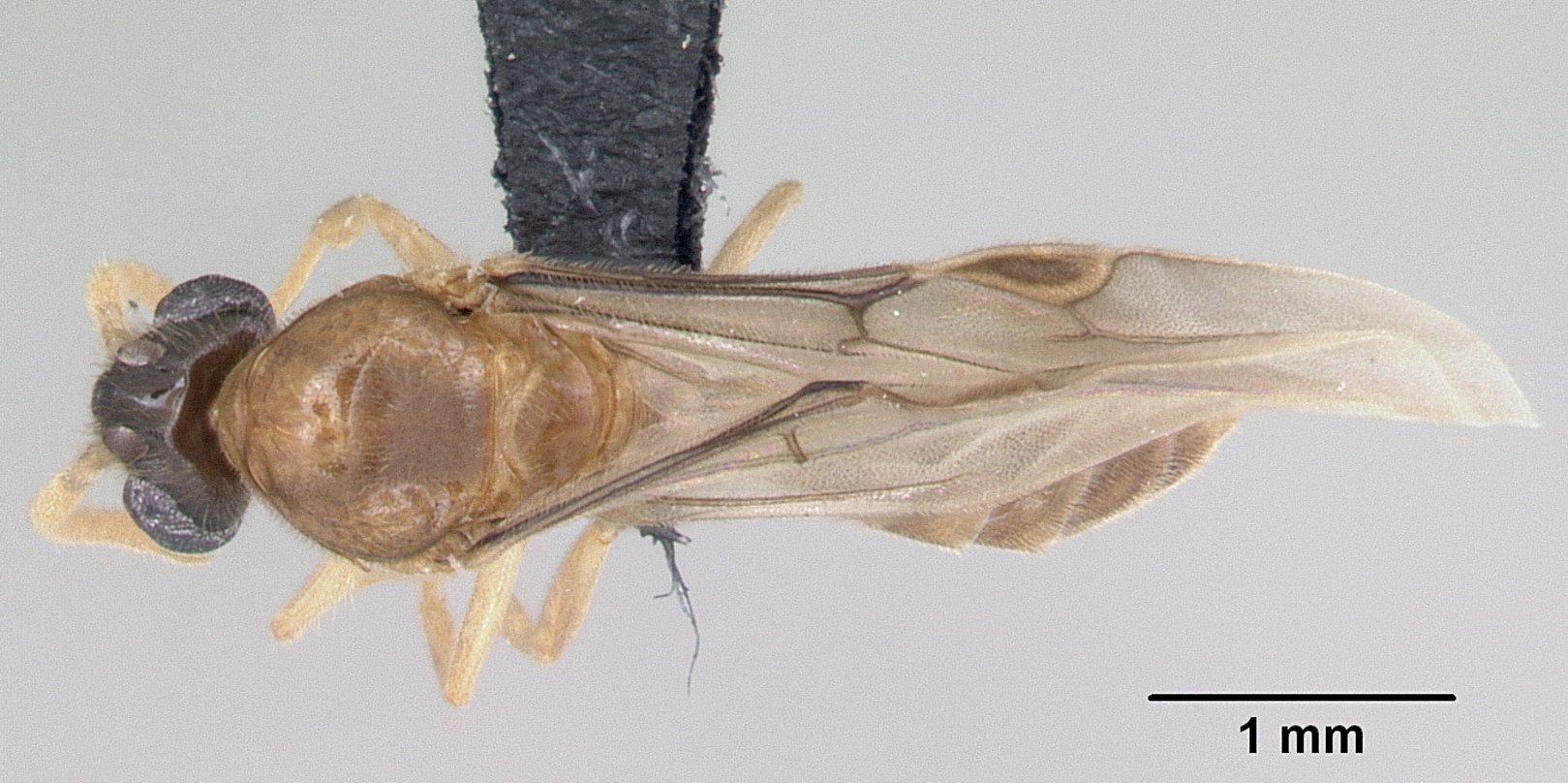
- A A. venatrix male alate

Scientific classification
- Kingdom: Animalia
- Phylum: Arthropoda
- Class: Insecta
- Order: Hymenoptera
- Family: Formicidae
- Subfamily: Amblyoponinae
- Tribe: Amblyoponini
- Genus: Adetomyrma; Ward, 1994

Type species
- Adetomyrma venatrix

Diversity
- 9 species

= Adetomyrma =

Genus of ants

Adetomyrma is a genus of ants endemic to Madagascar. Workers of this genus are blind. The type species Adetomyrma venatrix was described in 1994, with the genus being an atypical member of its tribe, the Amblyoponini. This tribe includes the Dracula ants, members of which can feed on the hemolymph of larvae and pupae.

== Taxonomy ==
Adetomyrma was first described as a Malagasy endemic monotypic genus by Ward in 1994. Ward (1994) assigned this genus to Amblyoponini within the subfamily Ponerinae on the basis of the worker morphology of the type species Adetomyrma venatrix. Later, Bolton (2003) raised this tribe to subfamily status as Amblyoponinae.

== Biology ==
The colonies, the first of which was found in a rotting log, may contain as many as 10,000 workers, winged males and several wingless queens (the majority of ant species feature winged queens). The workers use venom to stun their prey which are brought back to the colony for the larvae to feed upon. The colour of the winged males, a darker orange than the workers, suggests they disperse by flying to other colonies before mating.

== Known species ==
- Adetomyrma aureocuprea Yoshimura & Fisher, 2012
- Adetomyrma bressleri Yoshimura & Fisher, 2012
- Adetomyrma caputleae Yoshimura & Fisher, 2012
- Adetomyrma cassis Yoshimura & Fisher, 2012
- Adetomyrma caudapinniger Yoshimura & Fisher, 2012
- Adetomyrma cilium Yoshimura & Fisher, 2012
- Adetomyrma clarivida Yoshimura & Fisher, 2012
- Adetomyrma goblin Yoshimura & Fisher, 2012
- Adetomyrma venatrix Ward, 1994
