= Cao Thắng =

Vietnamese anticolonial fighter

Cao Thắng 高勝
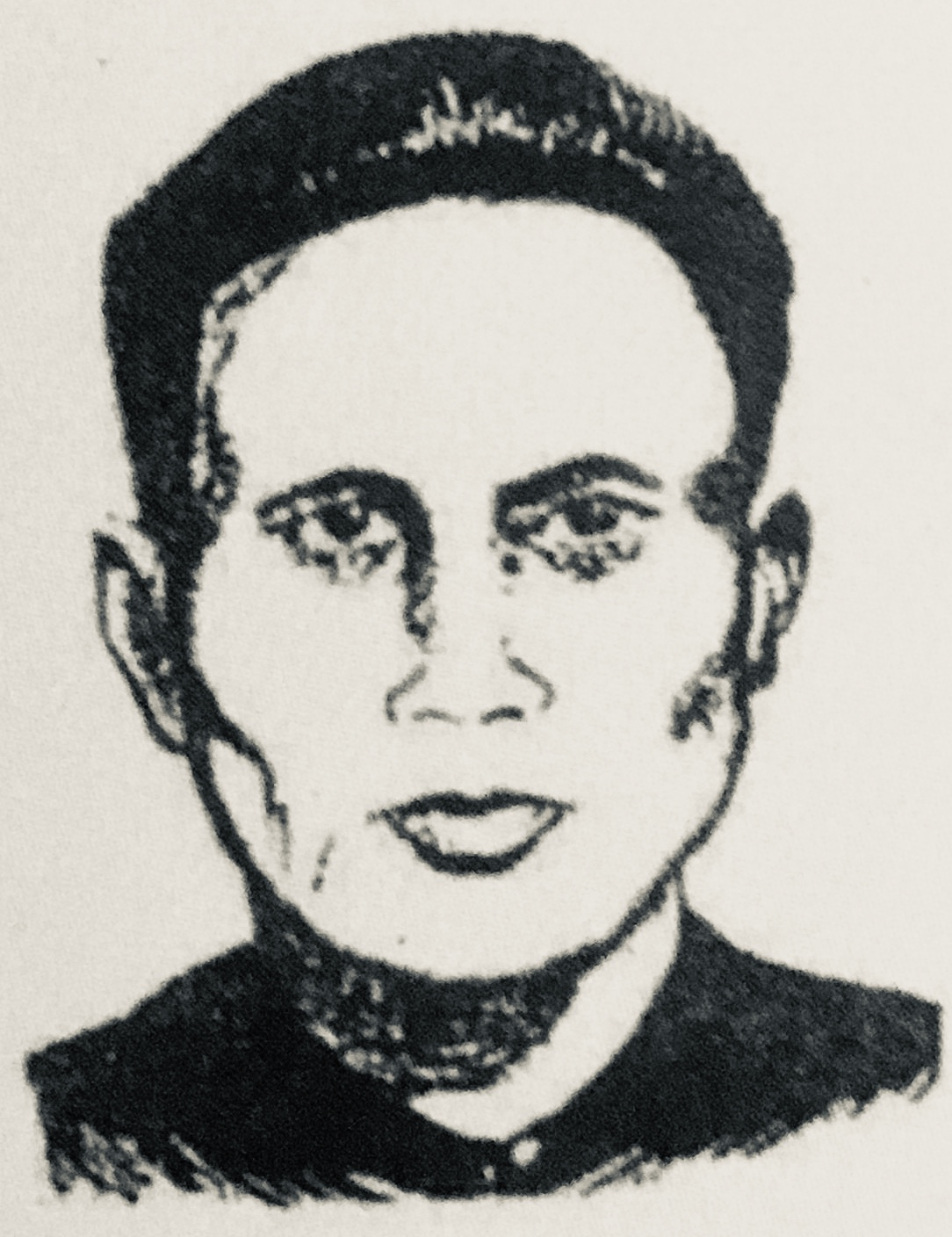
- A portrait of Cao Thắng, drawn by the French.
- Born: June 6, 1864; Châu Lễ, Hương Sơn, Hà Tĩnh Province, Nguyễn Dynasty
- Died: November 21, 1893 (aged 29); Vụ Quang, Hương Khê, Hà Tĩnh Province, Nguyễn Dynasty
- Movement: Cần Vương

Cao Thắng (chữ Hán: 高勝; 1864 - 1893) was a Vietnamese anticolonial fighter participating in the Hương Khê Uprising (Vietnamese: Khởi nghĩa Hương Khê). Cao Thắng was an assistant and military coordinator of Phan Đình Phùng, he was also considered his right-hand man. His forces operated in Thanh Hóa, Nghệ An and Hà Tĩnh provinces. He was killed in battle in 1893.

Cao Thắng is generally credited with organizing the local blacksmiths to manufacture thousands of Gras 1874 rifles to equip his troops.

== Revolutionary career ==
Cao Thắng, along with his younger brother - Cao Nữu and his close friend - Nguyễn Kiểu, recruited about 60 like-minded compatriots. They all voluntarily joined the Hương Khê Uprising in Hà Tĩnh province organized by the scholar Phan Đình Phùng (an revolutionary who had been appointed by Emperor Hàm Nghi to lead the resistance).

In 1887, as the Cần Vương movement began to weaken, Phan Đình Phùng entrusted the overall command to Cao Thắng, while he himself traveled to many provinces in the north, such as Sơn Tây, Hải Dương and Bắc Ninh, to seek support and forge alliances.

Cao Thắng, alongside other commanders like Cao Nữu, Cao Đạt, and Nguyễn Niên, led his force to the village of Lê Động (Hương Sơn district, Hà Tĩnh). They focused on rebuilding their strength: training troops, constructing a network of fortifications, and forging weapons there.

According to Hà Tĩnh newspaper, Cao Thắng had his men construct a system of fortifications across the Thiên Nhẫn and Giăng Màn mountain ranges. These fortifications enclosed the area, and they also provided routes leading into Laos, Nghệ An, Quảng Bình, and various parts of Hà Tĩnh, allowing mutual support in time. The French forces had only one access point to this area: National Highway 8. Consequently, these bases remained intact until the very end of the uprising (1896).

== Death ==
To break the encirclement and expand their operational territory, Cao Thắng, with Phan Đình Phùng's aspproval, led approximately one thousand soldiers from Ngàn Trươi to launch a major assault on the provincial capital of Nghệ An in November 1893, accompanied by Cao Nữu and Nguyễn Niên. They destroyed numerous enemy outposts on their march. However, during an attack on the Nu (or Nỏ) outpost in Thanh Chương, a mountainous district in the southwest of Nghệ An province, Cao Thắng was struck in the chest by a bullet during the night. His men managed to bring him back to Vụ Quang for medical treatment; yet, due to the severity of his wound, he passed away on November 21, 1893 at the age of only 29, which was a devastating loss for the Hương Khê resistance soldiers.

According to the historian Phạm Văn Sơn:

The Nỏ outpost was garrisoned by only a hundred soldiers. Realizing his forces could not withstand the attack, the commander, a sub-lieutenant named Phiến, split his troops: half of them stayed still to defend the outpost, while the remain soldiers moved out to prepare for an ambush. As Cao Thắng gave the order to attack, his force was suddenly caught in a crossfire from both the front and the rear. Unfortunately, Cao Thắng was fatally shot at the age of 29, which was a devastating loss for the Hương Khê resistance force. On March 29, 1894, Lãnh Lợi organized an ambush at Vạn Sơn, Nam Đồng in retaliation for Cao Thắng. Finally, Nguyễn Bảo succeeded in killing Phiến.

The Hương Khê force dwindled down after the lose of a capable leader and various sweeping operations from the French. Following the death of Cao Thắng, the Hương Khê army achieved a major victory at Vụ Quang (in October 1894), yet this failed to alter the overall situation. On December 28, 1895, the leader Phan Đình Phùng was also mortally wounded during a fierce battle. By early 1896, the Hương Khê uprising, a movement painstakingly built by Phan Đình Phùng, Cao Thắng, and other commanders, came to an end.
