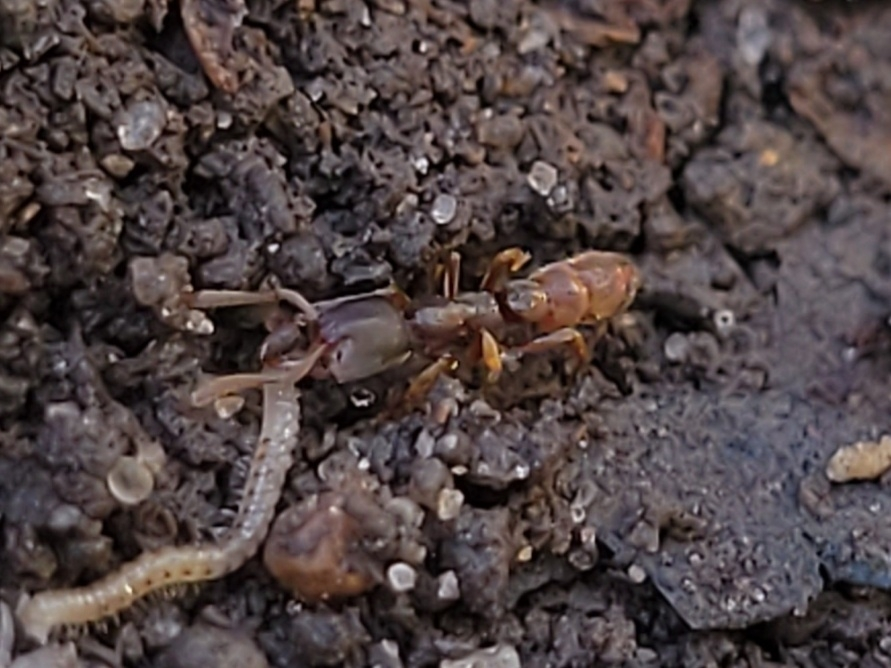
- In Montreal, Canada

Scientific classification
- Kingdom: Animalia
- Phylum: Arthropoda
- Clade: Pancrustacea
- Class: Insecta
- Order: Hymenoptera
- Family: Formicidae
- Genus: Stigmatomma
- Species: S. pallipes

Binomial name
- Stigmatomma pallipes (Haldeman, 1844)

Synonyms
- Amblyopone pallipes Haldeman, 1844

= Stigmatomma pallipes =

Species of insect

Stigmatomma pallipes, or vampire ant, is a species of ant in the subfamily Amblyoponinae. It is one of three species of Stigmatomma native to North America. They can be hard to find due to their habitat and small colony size.

== Description ==
A reddish-brown ant, generally 4.5–6 mm (0.18–0.24 in).

== Habitat ==
Individuals are typically found in wooded areas, in damp soil and leaf litter. Nests are usually found in soil under rocks, rotting logs, or at the base of trees. Colonies are small, typically consisting of anywhere between two and sixty individuals, although the latter is uncommon.

== Range ==
The vampire ant is found across most southern and eastern states, west to California and north to Quebec and Ontario.
