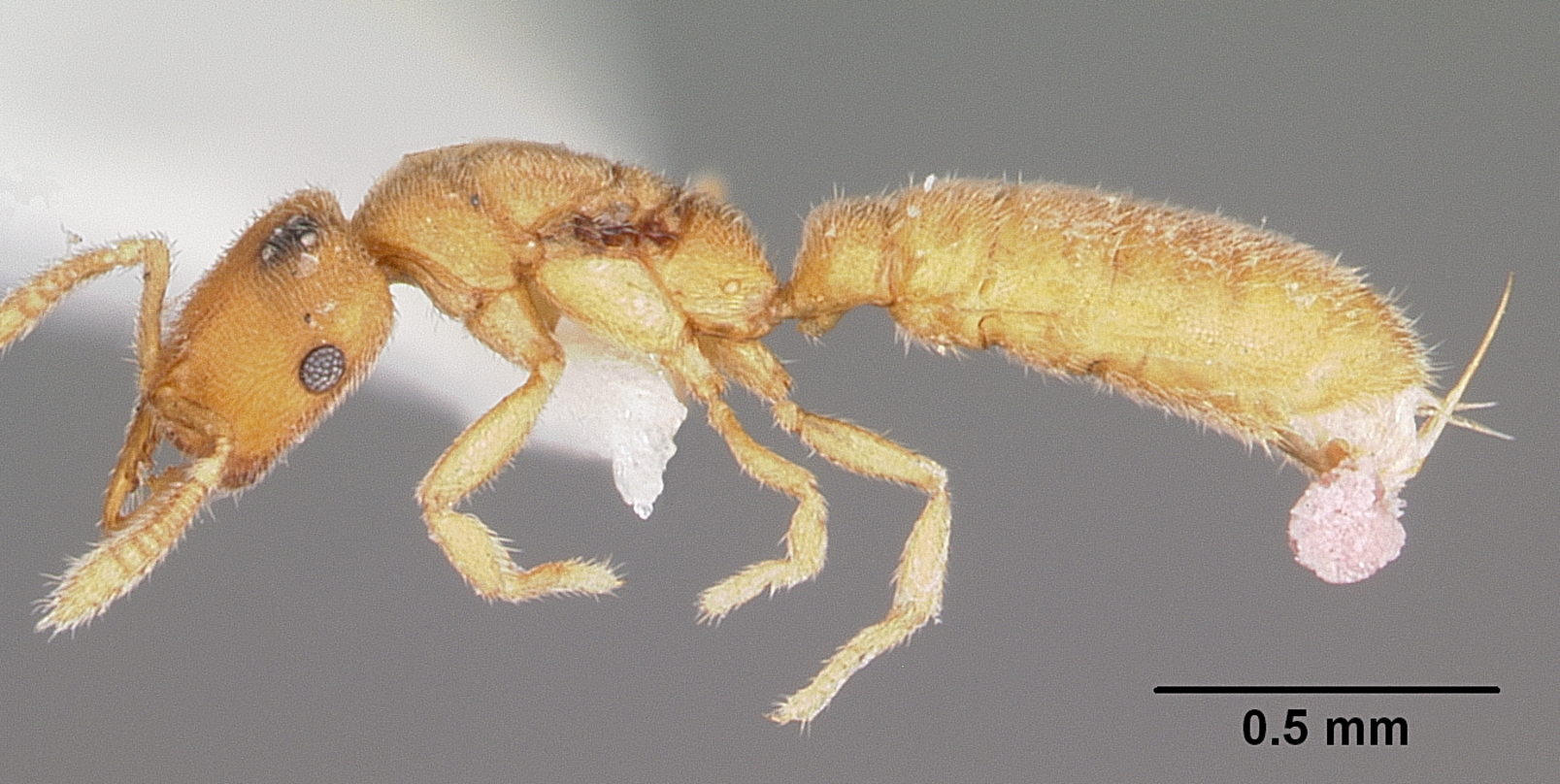
- Stigmatomma mulanae dealate queen (holotype specimen)

Scientific classification
- Domain: Eukaryota
- Kingdom: Animalia
- Phylum: Arthropoda
- Class: Insecta
- Order: Hymenoptera
- Family: Formicidae
- Genus: Stigmatomma
- Species: S. mulanae

Binomial name
- Stigmatomma mulanae (Xu, 2000)

Synonyms
- Bannapone mulanae Xu, 2000

= Stigmatomma mulanae =

Species of ant

Stigmatomma mulanae is a species of ant of the genus Stigmatomma. Described by Xu in 2000 from a single dealate queen found in 1998 in the Xishuangbanna Nature Reserve in Yunnan Province, it was placed as the type species of Bannapone, under the name Bannapone mulanae. It was moved to Stigmatomma by Ward & Fisher (2016).
