= Stigmatomma testaceum =

Scientific classification
- Kingdom: Animalia
- Phylum: Arthropoda
- Clade: Pancrustacea
- Class: Insecta
- Order: Hymenoptera
- Family: Formicidae
- Genus: Stigmatomma
- Species: S. testaceum

Binomial name
- Stigmatomma testaceum (Motschoulsky, 1863)

Synonyms
- Amblyopone testacea Motschoulsky, 1863

Species of ant

Stigmatomma testaceum, is a species of ant in the subfamily Amblyoponinae. The type locality is Sri Lanka.
