= Phan Đình Phùng =

Vietnamese revolutionary (1847–1896)

Phan Đình Phùng 潘廷逢
- A portrait of Phan Đình Phùng, printed in the book Những trận đổ máu hồi người Pháp mới sang ta đến ngày nay (Bloodshed occurred when the French first arrived in our country, up to the present day) by Ngô Tất Tố
- Born: June 6, 1847; Đông Thái, Hà Tĩnh Province, Nguyễn Dynasty
- Died: December 28, 1895 (aged 48); Nghệ An Province, Annam
- Other name: Phan Đình Phùng
- Movement: Cần Vương
- Awards: 1st place, Metropolitan imperial examinations, 1877

Notes
- Imperial Censor of Emperor Tự Đức

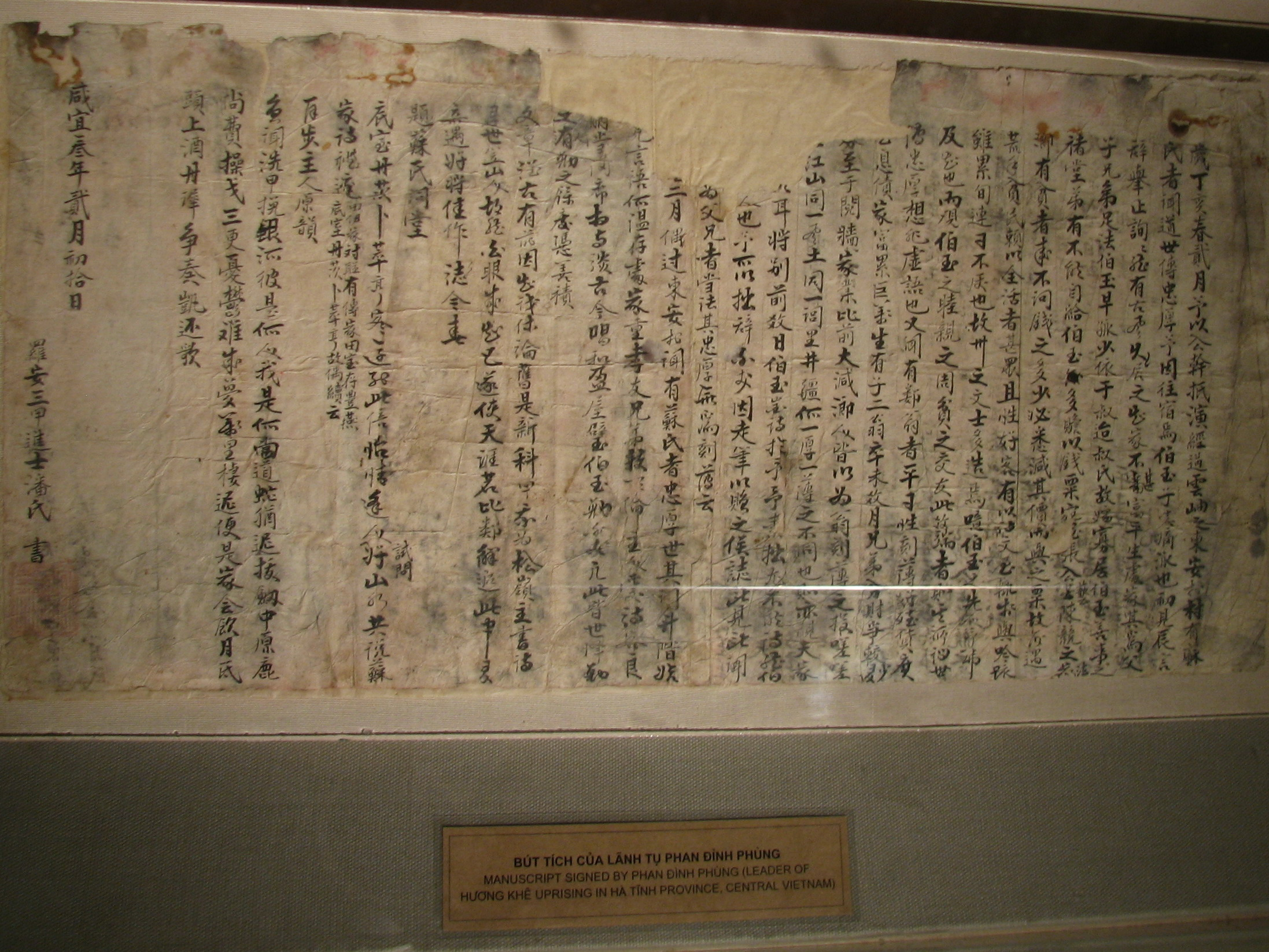
Manuscript signed by Phan Đình Phùng

Phan Đình Phùng (Vietnamese: [faːn ɗîŋ̟ fûŋm]; June 6, 1847 – December 28, 1895) was a Vietnamese revolutionary who led rebel armies against French colonial forces in Vietnam. He was the leader of the Hương Khê Uprising (Vietnamese: Khởi Nghĩa Hương Khê). He was the most prominent of the Confucian court scholars involved in anti-French military campaigns in the 19th century and was cited after his death by 20th-century nationalists as a national hero. He was renowned for his uncompromising will and principles—on one occasion, he refused to surrender even after the French had desecrated his ancestral tombs and had arrested and threatened to kill his family.

Born into a family of mandarins from Hà Tĩnh Province, Phan continued his ancestors' traditions by placing first in the metropolitan imperial examinations in 1877. Phan quickly rose through the ranks under Emperor Tự Đức of the Nguyễn dynasty, gaining a reputation for his integrity and uncompromising stance against corruption. Phan was appointed as the Imperial Censor, a position that allowed him to criticise his fellow mandarins and even the emperor. As the head of the censorate, Phan's investigations led to the removal of many incompetent or corrupt mandarins.

Upon Tự Đức's death, Phan almost died during a power struggle in the imperial court. The regent Tôn Thất Thuyết disregarded Tự Đức's will of succession, and three emperors were deposed and killed in just over a year. Phan protested against Thuyết's activities, was stripped of his honours and briefly jailed, before being exiled to his home province. At the time, France had just conquered Vietnam and made it a part of French Indochina. Along with Thuyết, Phan organised rebel armies as part of the Cần Vương movement, which sought to expel the French and install the boy Emperor Hàm Nghi at the head of an independent Vietnam. This campaign continued for three years until 1888, when the French captured Hàm Nghi and exiled him to French Algeria.

Phan and his military assistant Cao Thắng continued their guerrilla campaign, building a network of spies, bases and small weapons factories. However, Cao Thắng was killed in the process in late 1893. The decade-long campaign eventually wore Phan down, and he died from his injuries as the French surrounded his forces.

== Court official ==
Phan Đình Phùng was born June 6, 1847 in the village of Đông Thái in the northern central coast province of Hà Tĩnh. Đông Thái was famous for producing high-ranking mandarins and had been the home of senior imperial officials since the time of the Lê dynasty. Twelve consecutive generations of the Phan family had been successful mandarinate graduates. All three of Phan's brothers who lived to adulthood passed the imperial examinations and became mandarins. Early on, Phan indicated his distaste for the Confucian classical curriculum required of an aspiring mandarin. He nevertheless persevered with his studies, passing the regional exams in 1876 and then topping the metropolitan exams the following year. In his exam response, Phan cited Japan as an example of how an Asian country could make rapid military progress given sufficient willpower.

Phan was never known for his scholarly abilities; it was his reputation for principled integrity that led to his quick rise through the ranks under the reign of Emperor Tự Đức. He was first appointed as a district mandarin in Ninh Bình Province, where he punished a Vietnamese Roman Catholic priest, who, with the tacit support of French missionaries, had harassed local non-Catholics. Amid the diplomatic controversy that followed, he avoided blaming the unpopular alliance between Vietnamese Catholics and the French on Catholicism itself, stating that the partnership had arisen out of the military and political vulnerabilities of Vietnam's imperial government. Despite this, the Huế court eventually removed Phan from this post.

Phan was transferred to the Huế court as a member of the censorate, a watchdog body that monitored the work of the mandarinate. He earned the ire of many of his colleagues, but the trust of the emperor, by revealing that the vast majority of the court mandarins were making a mockery of a royal edict to engage in regular rifle practice. Tự Đức later dispatched Phan on an inspection trip to northern Vietnam. His report led to the ousting of many officials who were deemed corrupt or incompetent, including the viceroy of the northern region. He rose to become the Imperial Censor (Sino-Vietnamese: Ngự Sử), a position which allowed him to criticise other high officials and even the emperor for misconduct. Phan openly criticised Tôn Thất Thuyết, the foremost mandarin of the court, believing him to be rash and dishonest. Aside from his work in rooting out corruption, Phan also compiled a historical geography of Vietnam, which was published in 1883.

Despite his prominent position in the Nguyễn dynasty, little is known about Phan's personal stance on Vietnamese relations with France, which was in the process of colonising Vietnam. France had first invaded in 1858, beginning the colonisation of southern Vietnam. Three provinces were ceded under the 1862 Treaty of Saigon, and a further three in 1867 to form the colony of Cochinchina. During the period, there was debate in the Huế court on the best strategy to regain the territory. One group advocated military means, while another believed in the use of diplomacy in addition to financial and religious concessions. By the time of Tự Đức's death in 1883, the whole of Vietnam was colonised, henceforth incorporated with Laos and Cambodia into French Indochina.

Upon his death in 1883, the childless Tự Đức had named his nephew, Kiến Phúc, as his successor, rather than Dục Đức, his most senior heir. Tự Đức had written in his will that Dục Đức was depraved and unworthy of ruling the country. However, led by Thuyết, the regents enthroned Dục Đức under the pressure of the ladies of the court. Phan protested against the violation of Tự Đức's will of succession and refused to sanction anyone other than Kiến Phúc. Lucky to escape the death penalty, Phan was stripped of his positions. Later, Dục Đức was deposed and executed by Thuyết on the grounds of ignoring court etiquette, ignoring the mourning rites for Tự Đức and having affairs with the later emperor's consorts. Phan again protested the regents' actions and was briefly imprisoned by Thuyết, before being exiled to his home province.

== Revolutionary career ==
=== Cần Vương ===
Phan rallied to the cause of the boy Emperor Hàm Nghi—the fourth monarch in little over a year—after an abortive royal uprising at Huế in 1885. Thuyết and fellow regent Nguyễn Văn Tường had enthroned Hiệp Hòa after disposing of Dục Đức. However, the new emperor was wary of the regents' behaviour and attempted to avoid their influence, leading Thuyết to organise his execution. The teenage Kiến Phúc ascended the throne, but was poisoned by his adoptive mother Học Phi—one of Tự Đức's wives—whom he caught having intercourse with Tường. Kiến Phúc was thus replaced by his 14-year-old brother Hàm Nghi. In the meantime, the French concluded that the regents were causing too much trouble and had to be disposed of.

Thuyết had already decided to place Hàm Nghi at the head of the Phong Trào Cần Vương (Aid the King Movement), which sought to end French rule with a royalist rebellion. Phan helped the cause by setting up bases in Hà Tĩnh and creating his own guerrilla army. Thuyết had hoped to secure support from the Qing dynasty of China, but Phan thought that Vietnam's best chance of effective support came from Siam. Gia Long, the founder of the Nguyễn dynasty and great-grandfather of Tự Đức, had married his sister off to the King of Siam. He had also used Siam as a base-in-exile during his quest for the throne in the 1780s. However, direct appeals to the Siamese government only yielded a few pack trains of firearms and ammunition. In preparation for the revolt, Thuyết had been building up an armed base at Tân Sở for over a year.

In any case, the Cần Vương revolt started on July 5, 1885, when Thuyết launched a surprise attack against the colonial forces after a diplomatic confrontation with the French. Thuyết took Hàm Nghi northwards to the Tân Sở mountain base near the border with Laos after the attack failed. The campaign was launched when the emperor issued the Cần Vương edict that had been prepared by the regent.

Phan initially rallied support from his native village and set up his headquarters on Mount Vũ Quang, which overlooked the coastal French fortress at Hà Tĩnh. Phan's organisation became a model for future insurgents. For flexibility, he divided his operational zone into twelve districts. His forces upheld military discipline and wore uniforms. Phan initially used the local scholar-gentry as his military commanders. Their first notable attack targeted two nearby Catholic villages that had collaborated with French forces. Colonial troops arrived a few hours later, quickly overwhelming the rebels and forcing them to retreat to their home village, where the retribution was heavy. Phan managed to escape but his elder brother was captured by the same former viceroy of northern Vietnam who had been removed from office as a result of Phan's critical report. The disgraced official was now a French collaborator, serving as the governor of Nghệ An Province.

The strategy of attempting to pressure Phan into capitulating was a classical strategy of coercion. The French used an old friend and fellow villager to make an emotional and deeply Confucian appeal for Phan to surrender in order to save his brother, his ancestral tombs and his entire village. Phan was reported to have replied:

(Original Vietnamese)

Nay tôi chỉ có một ngôi mộ rất to nên giữ là nước Việt Nam.
Tôi chỉ có một ông anh rất to là mấy triệu đồng bào.
Nếu về mà sửa sang lại phần mộ tổ tiên riêng mình thì ngôi mộ cả nước ai giữ?
Về cứu sống ông anh của riêng mình thì còn bao nhiêu anh em trong nước ai cứu?

(English)
From the time I joined with you in the Cần Vương movement, I determined to forget the question of family and village.
Now I have but one tomb, a very large one, that must be defended: the land of Vietnam.
I have only one brother, very important, that is in danger: more than twenty million countrymen.
If I worry about my own tombs, who will worry about defending the tombs of the rest of the country?
If I save my own brother, who will save all the other brothers of the country?
There is only one way for me to die now.

Phan was later reported to have simply retorted, "If anyone carves up my brother, remember to send me some of the soup". However, he held no illusions about the prospect of successfully driving out the French, stating "It is our destiny. We accept it."

This incident and Phan's response are often cited as one of the reasons why he was so admired by the populace and among future generations of Vietnamese anti-colonialists: he adhered to the highest personal standards of patriotism. He identified with a countrywide cause, far removed from the questions of family and region.

Phan's men were well-trained and disciplined, and the military inspiration behind his rebellion was derived from Cao Thắng, a bandit leader who had been protected from royal forces by Phan's brother a decade earlier. They operated in the provinces of Thanh Hóa in the north, Hà Tĩnh, Nghệ An in the centre and Quảng Bình in the south, with their strongest areas being the two central provinces. In 1887, Phan concluded that his tactics were misguided, ordering his subordinates to cease open combat and resort to guerrilla tactics. His men built up a network of base camps, food caches, intelligence agents and peasant supply contacts. Phan traveled to the north in the hope of coordinating strategic and tactical plans with other leaders. In the meantime, Cao Thắng led a force of around 1,000 men with some 500 firearms between them. Cao Thắng produced around 300 rifles by disassembling and copying 1874-model French weapons that had been captured. For the purpose of creating such replica guns, they captured Vietnamese artisans. According to French officers who later captured some of the Vietnamese copies, the weapons were proficiently reproduced. The only details in which they were regarded as being defective were in the tempering of the springs, which were improvised with umbrella spokes, and the lack of rifling in the barrels, which curtailed range and accuracy.

Nevertheless, the weaponry used by Phan's rebels was far inferior to that of their adversaries, and their inland positions were within firing range of the French Navy. The Vietnamese could not rely on China to give them material support, and other European powers such as Portugal, The Netherlands and the United Kingdom were unwilling to sell them weapons for various reasons. Thus, Phan had to explore overland routes to procure weapons from Siamese sources—using seafaring transport was impossible due to the presence of the French Navy. He instructed his followers to create a secret route from Hà Tĩnh through Laos into northeastern Siam; one such route from Mount Vũ Quang was believed to have been created around 1888. It is unclear if Phan himself went to Thailand, but a young female supporter named Cô Trâm was his designated arms buyer in Tha Uthen, which boasted a substantial expatriate Vietnamese community. In 1890, the Siamese Army transported around 1,000 Austrian repeating-rifles from Bangkok to Luang Prabang in Laos. However, it is unclear whether the weapons found their way into Vietnamese hands or whether they were related to Cô Trâm's activities.

=== After Cần Vương ===
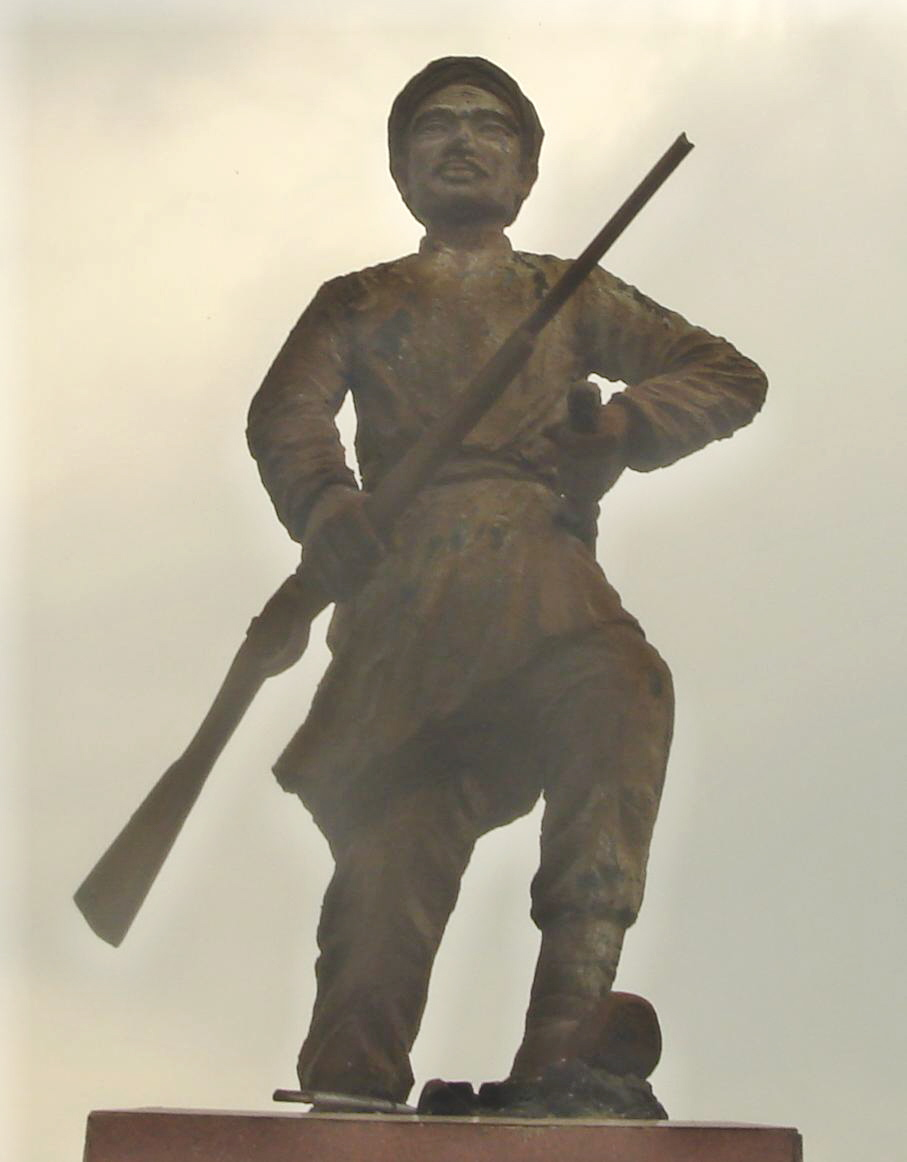
A statue of Phan Đình Phùng in District 5, Ho Chi Minh City

In 1888, Hàm Nghi's Mường bodyguard Trương Quang Ngọc betrayed him, leading to the emperor's capture and deportation to Algeria. Phan and Cao Thắng fought on in the mountainous areas of Hà Tĩnh, Nghệ An and Thanh Hóa. Another 15 bases were built along the mountain to complement the headquarters at Vũ Quang. Each base had a subordinate commander leading units numbering between 100 and 500 men. The operations were funded by local villagers, who were levied with a land tax in silver and rice. Local bases were supported by nearby villages and excess funds were sent to Vũ Quang. Phan's men foraged and sold cinnamon bark to raise funds, while lowland peasants donated spare metals for the production of weapons.

When Phan returned from the north in 1889, his first order was to track down Hàm Nghi's betrayer Ngọc. When he was found, Phan personally executed Ngọc in Tuyên Hóa. He then began a series of small-unit attacks on French installations through the summer of 1890, but these proved indecisive. The French relied mostly on district and provincial colonial units to man their perpetually increasing line of forts, which were usually commanded by a French lieutenant. In late 1890, a French effort to move into the low-lying villages and isolate the populace from the mountainous rebel bases failed. In the spring of 1892, a major French sweep of Hà Tĩnh failed, and in August, Cao Thắng seized the initiative with a bold counterattack on the provincial capital. The rebels broke into the prison and freed their compatriots, killing a large number of the Vietnamese soldiers who defended the penitentiary as members of the French colonial forces. This caused the French to intensify their efforts against Phan, and a counteroffensive was conducted throughout the remainder of 1892, forcing the rebels to retreat back into the mountains. Two of their bases fell and steady French pressure began to break their covert resistance links with lowland villages. This compounded the problems of securing food, supplies, intelligence data and recruits. A ring of French forts continued to be erected, increasingly pinning down Phan's men. The only notable gain for Phan's forces during this period was the acquisition of gunpowder supplies from Siam. This enabled them to mix foreign and local powder in a 50:50 ratio, rather than their previous weaker mixture of 20:80.

Late in the year, the burden on Phan increased after the loss of two Cần Vương allies. In September, Tống Duy Tân—who led the royalists in Thanh Hóa—was captured and publicly executed. Nguyễn Thiện Thuật, who had been active in the northern provinces of Hưng Yên and Hải Dương, fled to Guangxi in China. The supporters of Tân and Thuật moved south and integrated into Phan's force.

In mid-1893, Cao Thắng proposed a full-scale attack on the provincial seat of Nghệ An and the surrounding posts. The plan proposed to Phan included diversions to the south and the training of almost 2,000 men in conventional military tactics. Unconvinced of its viability, Phan reluctantly approved the plan. The troops were eager, but after overpowering several small posts en route, the main force was pinned down while attacking the French fort of No on September 9, 1893. Along with his brother, Cao Thắng was fatally shot while leading a risky frontal attack with 150 men, and the forces retreated in disarray. Phan regarded the loss of Cao Thắng as a significant one, admitting as much in delivering the eulogy and funeral oration. According to the historian David Marr, there was evidence that Phan clearly realised the advantages and limitations of prolonged resistance. Although Phan had previously stated that he was not expecting ultimate success, the guerrilla leader thought that it was important to keep pressuring the French in order to demonstrate to the populace that there was an alternative to what he felt was a defeatist attitude from the Huế court.

=== Downfall ===
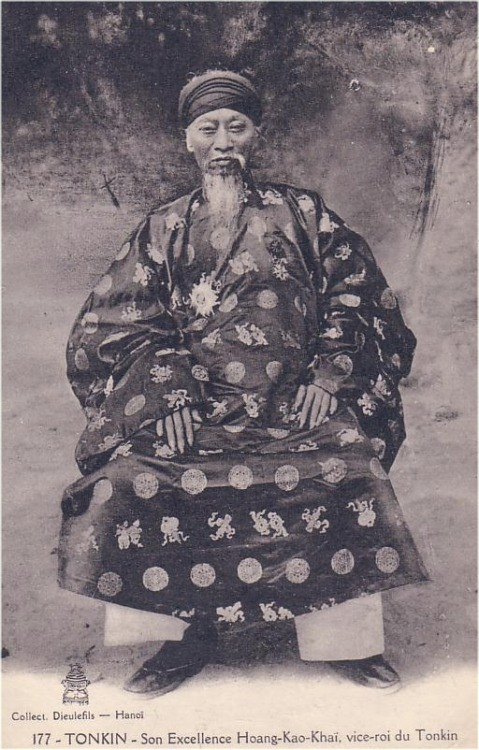
Hoàng Cao Khải

Hoàng Cao Khải, the French-installed viceroy of Tonkin, perceived Phan's intent to a degree that his French masters did not. Khải was from a scholar-gentry family from the same village as Phan. He became the main backer of a determined effort to crush Phan's forces, using every means available: political, psychological and economic. By late 1894, relatives and suspected sympathisers of the insurgents were intimidated and more resistance commanders had been killed. Communications were disrupted, and the rebel hideouts became increasingly insecure. In an attempt to force Phan to surrender, the French arrested his family and desecrated the tombs of his ancestors, publicly displaying the remains in Hà Tĩnh.

Khải delivered a message to Phan via a relative. Phan sent a written reply, allowing their exchange to be studied. Khải recalled the common origins of the pair and promised Phan that he would lobby Governor-General Jean Marie Antoine de Lanessan and other French officials for an amnesty in return for Phan's surrender. Khải credited Phan with righteousness, loyalty and dedication towards the monarchy.

The situation has changed and even those without intelligence or education have concluded that nothing remains to be saved. How is it that you, a man of vast understanding, do not realise this?... You are determined to do whatever you deem to be righteous... All that matters indeed is giving of one's life to one's country. No one therefore can deter you from your goal. I have always been taught that superior men should consider the care of the people as fundamental; who has ever heard of men who were loyal to their King but forgot the people's aspirations?... As of now, hundreds of families are subject to grief; how do you have the heart to fight on? I venture to predict that, should you pursue your struggle, not only will the population of our village be destroyed but our entire country will be transformed into a sea of blood and a mountain of bones.

According to Marr, "Phan Dinh Phung's reply was a classic in savage understatement, utilizing standard formalism in the interest of propaganda, with deft denigration of his opponent". Phan appealed to Vietnamese nationalist sentiment, recalling his country's stubborn resistance to Chinese aggression. He cited defensive wars against the Han, Tang, Song, Yuan and Ming dynasties, asking why a country "a thousand times more powerful" could not annex Vietnam. Phan concluded that it was "because the destiny of our country has been willed by Heaven itself".

Phan placed the responsibility for the suffering of the people at the feet of the French, who "acted like a storm". After analysing his own actions, Phan concluded with a thinly veiled attack on Khải and his collaborators.

If our region has suffered to such an extent, it was not only from the misfortunes of war. You must realise that wherever the French go, there flock around them groups of petty men who offer plans and tricks to gain the enemy's confidence. These persons create every kind of enmity; they incriminate innocent persons, blaming one one day, punishing another the next. They use every expedient to squeeze the people out of their possessions. That is how hundred of misdeeds, thousands of offenses have been perpetrated.

Khải's appeal was rebutted with an appeal to history, nationalist sentiment and a demand that the blame for death and destruction lay with the colonial forces and their Vietnamese assistants. Phan raised the stakes above family and village to the entire nation and its populace.

On October 17, 1894, Phan Đình Phùng secured his final major victory by damming a river and releasing water and logs onto crossing French troops, inflicting heavy casualties and capturing weapons. According to Phạm Văn Sơn, the French lost significant equipment, medical supplies, three officers, and more than one hundred soldiers. With Phan Đình Phùng's rebuke in his hands, Khải translated both documents into French and presented them to De Lanessan, proposing that it was time for the final "destruction of this scholar gentry rebellion". In July 1895, French area commanders called in 3,000 troops to tighten the cordon around the three remaining rebel bases. The insurgents were able to execute ambushes at night. A collaborator mandarin named Nguyễn Thân, who had previous experience in pacification in Quảng Ngãi and Quảng Nam, was drafted in to isolate the insurgents from their supporters in the villages. Despite executing night ambushes, the insurgents were left to survive by eating roots and occasional handfuls of dried corn, and their shoes were worn through and most were without blankets because of being cut off from their supplies.

The encirclement steadily tightened until Phan Đình Phùng was mortally wounded in battle and subsequently died on December 28, 1895. Following Phùng's death, his remaining followers were either perished in the forests or killed in action, others were captured, executed, retreated to Siam or surrendered. By early 1896, the Hương Khê uprising, a movement painstakingly built by Phan Đình Phùng, Cao Thắng, and other commanders, came to an end. A report submitted by the De Lanessan to the Minister of Colonies in Paris stated that "the soul of resistance to the protectorate was gone".

== Legacy ==
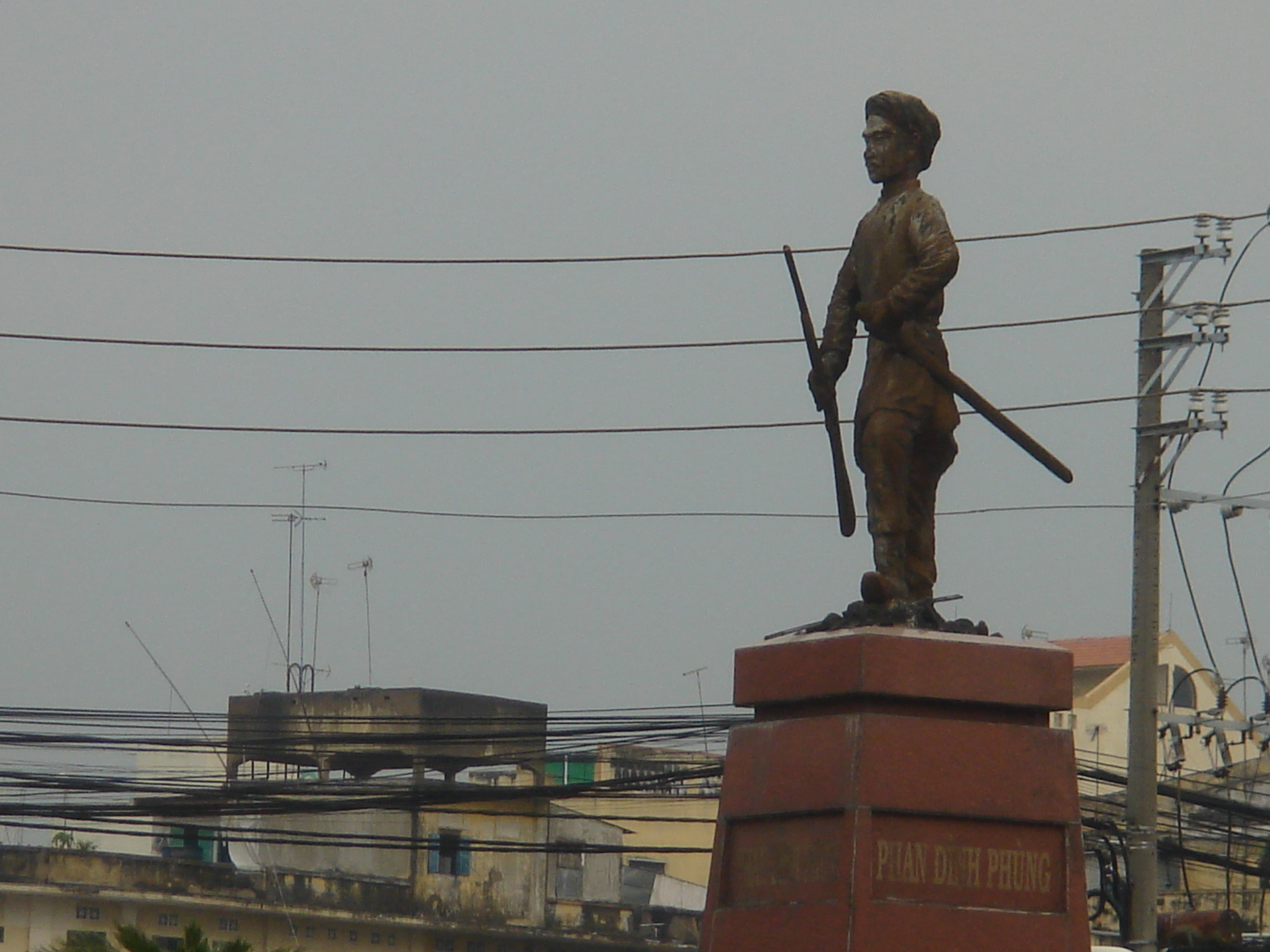
Statue of Phan Đình Phùng in District 5, Ho Chi Minh City, Vietnam

Some historians accused Nguyễn Thân of having Phan's tomb exhumed, but two others, Nguyễn Quang Tô in 1974, then Tôn Thất Thọ in 2017, considered that is oral, fictitious, unofficial information, not historical data with "black ink and white paper".

Phan is widely regarded by Vietnamese people as a revolutionary and national hero. Phan Bội Châu, regarded as the leading Vietnamese anti-colonial figure of the early 20th century, strongly praised Phan in his writing, with particular emphasis on his defiance of Khải. During Phan Bội Châu's career as a teacher, he strongly emphasised Phan's deeds to his students. In 1941, after returning to Vietnam after decades in exile, the Marxist revolutionary Hồ Chí Minh, then using the name Nguyễn Ái Quốc (Nguyễn the Patriot), invoked the memory of Phan in appealing to the public for support for his independence movement. Like Phan, Hồ was a native of Nghệ An and Hà Tĩnh. In the 1940s, Hồ's Việt Minh named their self-produced style of grenades in honour of Phan. Since then, Hồ's communists have portrayed themselves as the modern day incarnations of revered nationalist leaders such as Phan, Trương Định and Emperors Lê Lợi and Quang Trung, who expelled Chinese forces from Vietnam. Both North and South Vietnam had prominent thoroughfares in their capital cities (Hanoi and Saigon, respectively) named in Phan's honour. The ant species Xymmer phungi is named in his honour.
