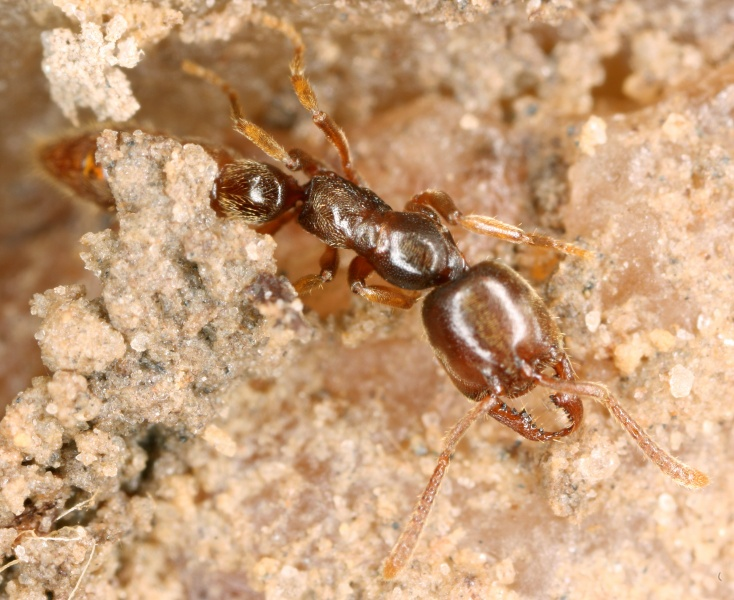

Scientific classification
- Kingdom: Animalia
- Phylum: Arthropoda
- Class: Insecta
- Order: Hymenoptera
- Family: Formicidae
- Genus: Stigmatomma
- Species: S. trigonignathum

Binomial name
- Stigmatomma trigonignathum (Brown, 1949)

Synonyms
- Amblyopone trigonignathum Brown, 1949

= Stigmatomma trigonignathum =

Species of insect

Stigmatomma trigonignathum is a species of ant in the subfamily Amblyoponinae. It is considered one of the rarest ants in the world, only known from one specimen collected in 1948 and another observed in 2008. Both records are from the Piedmont region of North Carolina.

== Description ==
The 1948 type specimen is 6.12 mm long, including mandibles but excluding stinger. It is mostly uniform ferruginous in color.
