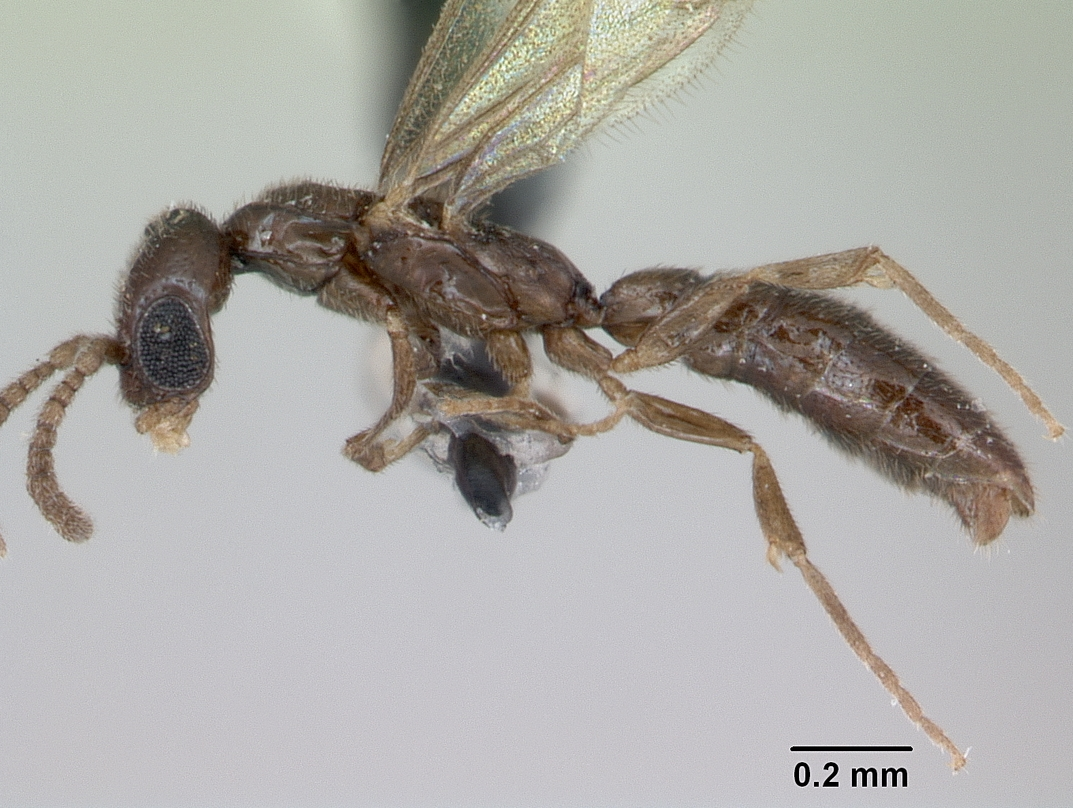
- Fulakora minima male

Scientific classification
- Domain: Eukaryota
- Kingdom: Animalia
- Phylum: Arthropoda
- Class: Insecta
- Order: Hymenoptera
- Family: Formicidae
- Genus: Fulakora
- Species: F. minima

Binomial name
- Fulakora minima (Kusnezov, 1955)

= Fulakora minima =

Genus of ants

Fulakora minima is a species of ants described by Kusnezov (1955) from males collected in Tucumán, Argentina, and originally placed in its own genus, Paraprionopelta.
