= Stigmatomma scrobiceps =

Scientific classification
- Domain: Eukaryota
- Kingdom: Animalia
- Phylum: Arthropoda
- Class: Insecta
- Order: Hymenoptera
- Family: Formicidae
- Genus: Stigmatomma
- Species: S. scrobiceps

Binomial name
- Stigmatomma scrobiceps (Guénard, Blanchard, Liu, Yang,& Economo, 2013)

Synonyms
- Bannapone scrobiceps Guénard, Blanchard, Liu, Yang,& Economo, 2013

Species of ant

Stigmatomma scrobiceps is a species of ant in the genus Stigmatomma. It was described as Bannapone scrobiceps by Guénard et al. in 2013, based on two specimens collected in Yunnan Province, China, and placed as the second species in Bannapone. It was moved to Stigmatomma by Ward and Fisher (2016).

Specimens were found in habitats that were forests with considerable amounts of leaf litter and rotting wood materials. Due to the few specimens collected and the fact that the area has been relatively studied, Guénard et al. (2013) ranked the genus as one of the most rare ant genera in the world. However, they could not rule out whether collection techniques, crypsis, or subterranean habits (known to occur among ants within the subfamily) biased the frequency of the collections.

== Etymology ==
The name refers to antennal scrobes on the heads of the workers, and the name's translation from Latin means trench-headed (= trench) and "ceps" (= headed).
