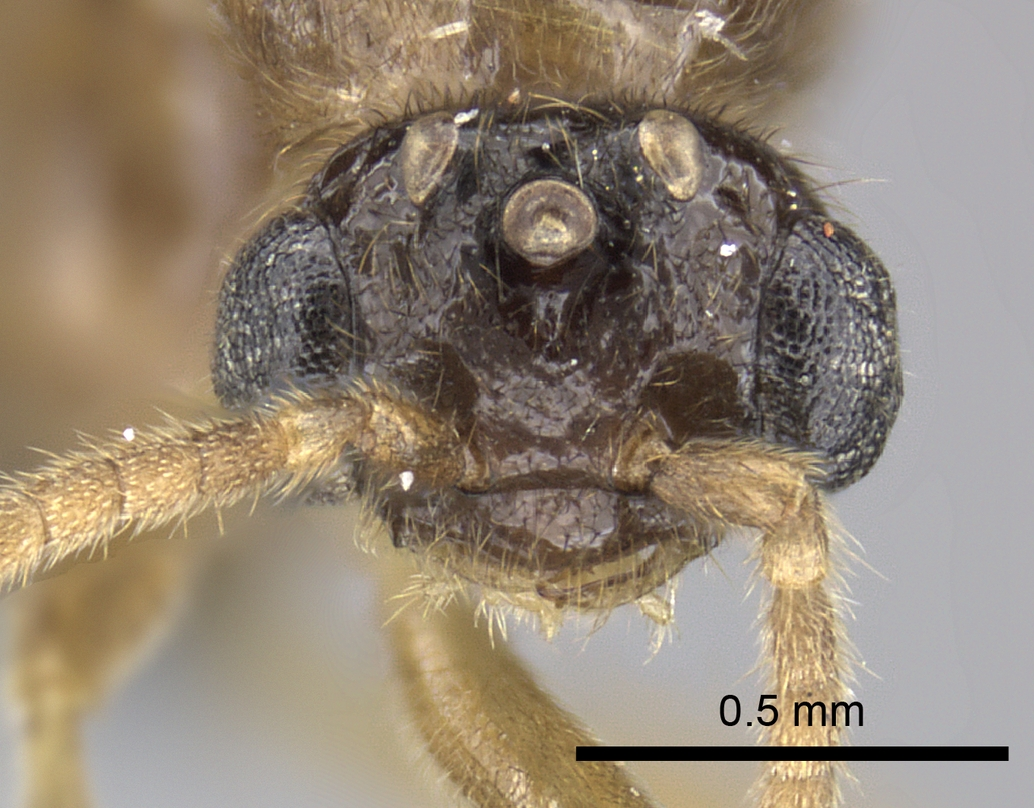

Scientific classification
- Kingdom: Animalia
- Phylum: Arthropoda
- Class: Insecta
- Order: Hymenoptera
- Family: Formicidae
- Genus: Adetomyrma
- Species: A. caudapinniger

Binomial name
- Adetomyrma caudapinniger Yoshimura & Fisher, 2012

= Adetomyrma caudapinniger =

Species of ant

Adetomyrma caudapinniger (from Latin caudapinna, "tail fin", and gero, "have", referring to the distinctive paramere) is a species of ant endemic to Madagascar.

== Description ==
Adetomyrma caudapinniger is only known from males. The male is distinguished easily from other Adetomyrma males by its bilobed paramere and 2,2 palpal formula. These characters, as well as those observed in the aedeagus, are unique to Adetomyrma caudapinniger, and a separation of this species from the remaining Adetomyrma species is clear and consistent. For example, A. aureocuprea, which is superficially similar to A. caudapinniger, has a simple paramere and a 3,3 palpal formula.
