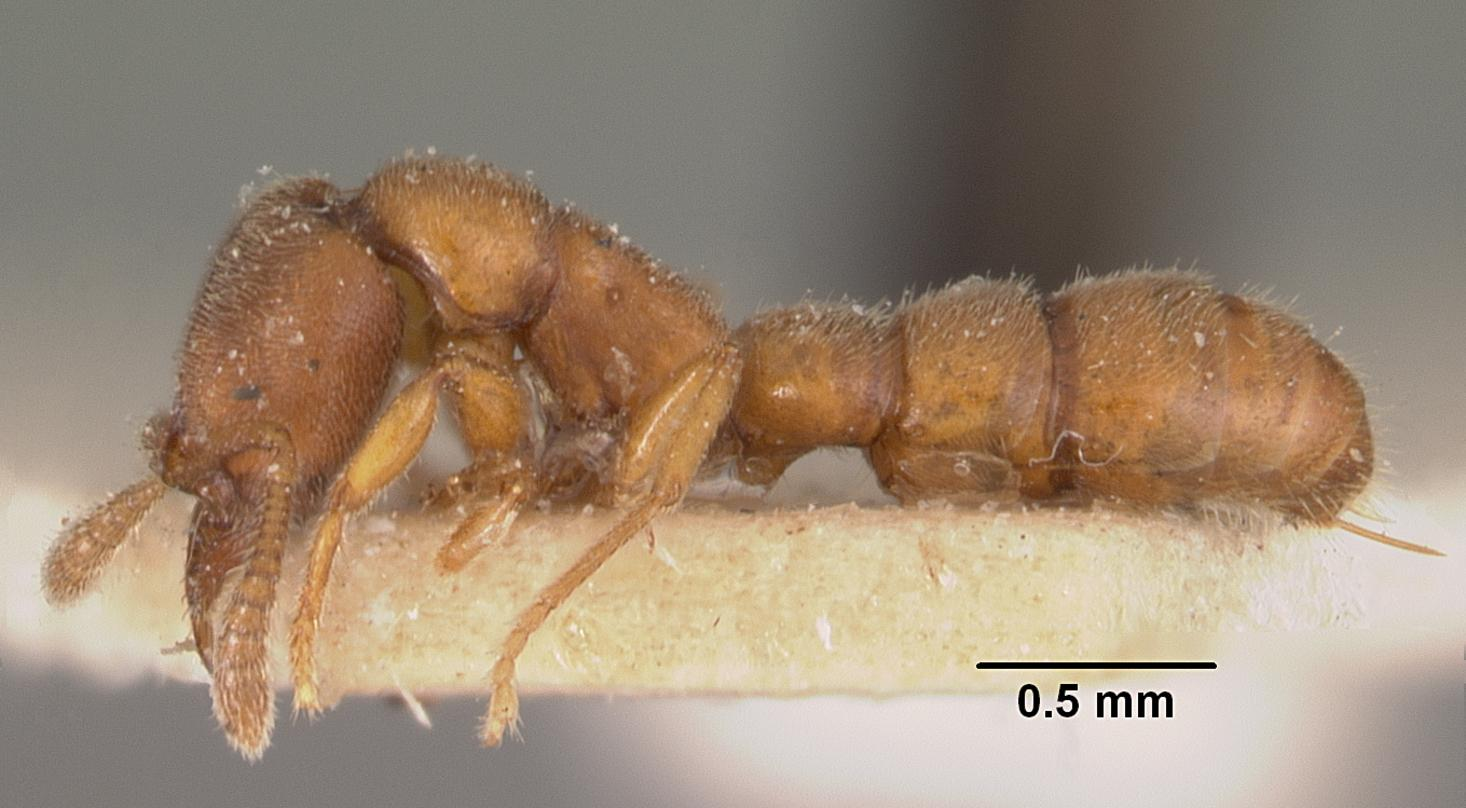
- Fulakora saundersi worker

Scientific classification
- Kingdom: Animalia
- Phylum: Arthropoda
- Class: Insecta
- Order: Hymenoptera
- Family: Formicidae
- Genus: Fulakora
- Species: F. saundersi

Binomial name
- Fulakora saundersi (Forel, 1892)

Synonyms
- Amblyopone saundersi Forel, 1892 Stigmatomma saundersi (Forel, 1892)

= Fulakora saundersi =

Species of ant

Fulakora saundersi (Forel 1892), commonly known as the New Zealand Michelin ant, is a species of ant within the family Formicidae in the genus Fulakora, found throughout New Zealand.

== Description ==
The New Zealand Michelin ant worker can reach lengths of 3 to 5 millimeters (outstretched and including mandible), with a dark brown head and thorax. The abdomen then graduates from brown to light brown. The ants six limbs are light brown in colour. The Michelin ant has two short, 12 segmented antennae, and eight mandibular teeth; 1 sharp apical tooth, 2 small teeth, 3 large bifid teeth, and 2 conical teeth. The ant species has small, compound eyes that are located midway behind the sides of the head. F. saundersi is smaller and slimmer than its close and similar looking relative Amblyopone australis and has smaller palpi.

== Range ==
=== Natural global range ===
Fulakora saundersi is endemic to New Zealand, as supported by its widespread distribution throughout the country. This also implies a long period of establishment within the country. The species is distinct from its Amblyopone relatives, consisting of 62 described species with 17 residing in Australia.

=== New Zealand range ===
The Michelin ant is found in the three main islands of New Zealand – Stewart Island, South Island, and North Island – as well as the Chatham Islands, Three Kings Island, and other offshore islands.

== Habitat ==
The species is found throughout New Zealand residing in forests, coastal scrubland, and gardens, nesting underneath leaf litter and in rotting logs and branches (also known as hypogaeic). The ants rarely forage above ground in day light. The genus Amblyopone shares this common choice of habitat, such as the Amblyopone australis Erichson 1842, a relative of Fulakora saundersi introduced from Australia.

== Ecology ==
=== Life cycle/phenology ===
The New Zealand Michelin ant, like most other ant species, has one breeding event per year. Winged males and females will emerge from their nests at the same time and mate in mid-air. Once mated, the males will decease where then the females will land at their carcass and feed on their wings. After mating, females will fly to find a suitable location to initiate a new colony. This habit is known as colony budding. The specific life cycle of this species is unresearched, however, it is believed to be the same as other ant species; a life cycle that lasts around 6 to 10 weeks where the queen ant produces eggs; where fertilised eggs produce females, and unfertilised eggs produce males. Colonies of this species are small in size with only 10 – 30 workers. The nests are designed as a simple shallow tunnel in the soil, temporary in structure. This relates to the short generational cycle of the nest, which only lasts a few generations of workers.

=== Diet and foraging ===
Fulakora saundersi are carnivores and so their diet typically consists of other insects. Worker Michelin Ants have been observed feeding larvae with pieces of insects; A primitive tactic of feeding compared to the more advanced trophallaxis. The larvae of this species are known to cannibalize each other if food is scarce. However, the queen will forage for food for their first generation of larvae and may also continue this behaviour alongside the workers. The larvae and queen may feed on trophic eggs as a common food source. Workers have the ability to sting in order to immobilize prey, capturing them within their mandibles and injecting a potent toxin with their stinger.

=== Predators, parasites, and diseases ===
Many native animals pose threats to the New Zealand Michelin ant, such as birds, beetles, and snails. Invasive ant species can also be a threat, such as the introduced Argentine ant, which was first detected in New Zealand in 1990.

== Closely related species ==
Fulakora saundersi is endemic to New Zealand, but is related to the genus Amblyopone, which contains 62 species, 17 of which are located in Australia. However, this species has distinct characteristics such as smaller size compared to Amblyopone australis. As well as this, the ant has many ‘primitive' features, such as its lack of trophallaxis, which could imply that the ancestral lineages were separated when on Gondwana split.

== Sampling ==
Fulakora saundersi is commonly observed and sampled through pitfall traps and litter extractions from scrub and forests.
