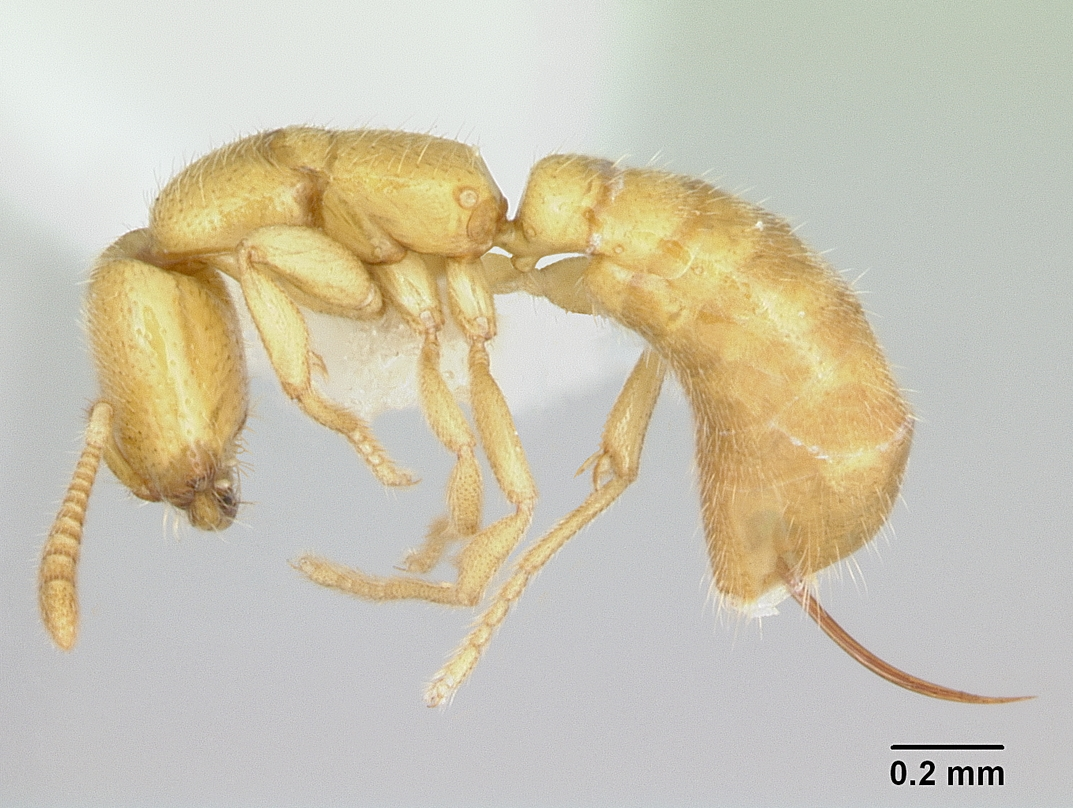
- A blind worker
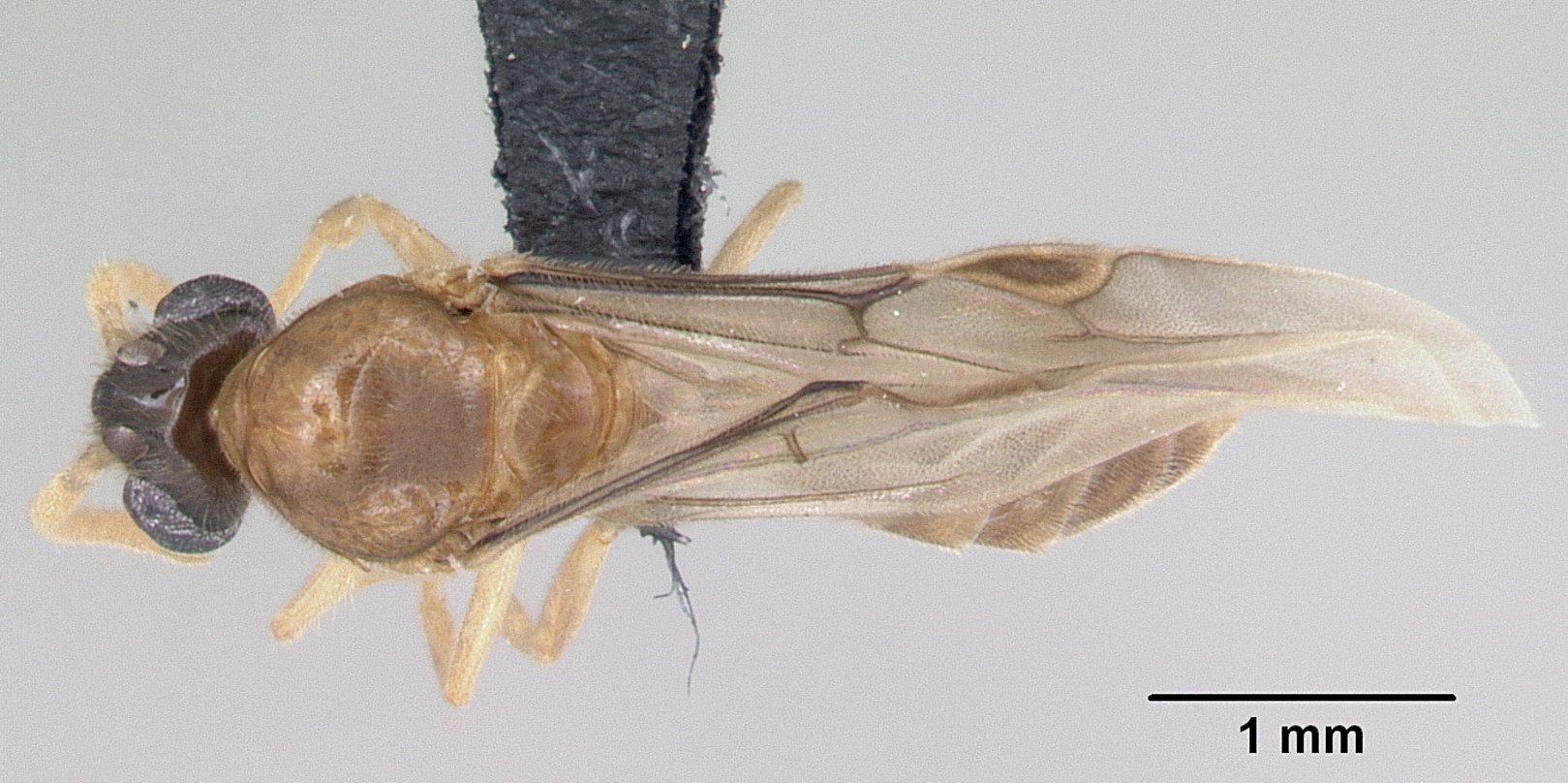
- A winged male

Conservation status
- Critically Endangered (IUCN 2.3)

Scientific classification
- Kingdom: Animalia
- Phylum: Arthropoda
- Class: Insecta
- Order: Hymenoptera
- Family: Formicidae
- Genus: Adetomyrma
- Species: A. venatrix

Binomial name
- Adetomyrma venatrix Ward, 1994

= Adetomyrma venatrix =

Species of ant

Adetomyrma venatrix, more commonly known as the "Dracula ant" due to its habit of drinking the blood of its young, is an endangered species of ants endemic to Madagascar. Workers of this species are blind. The species was described as the type species of Adetomyrma in 1994, with the genus being an atypical member of its tribe.

== Description ==
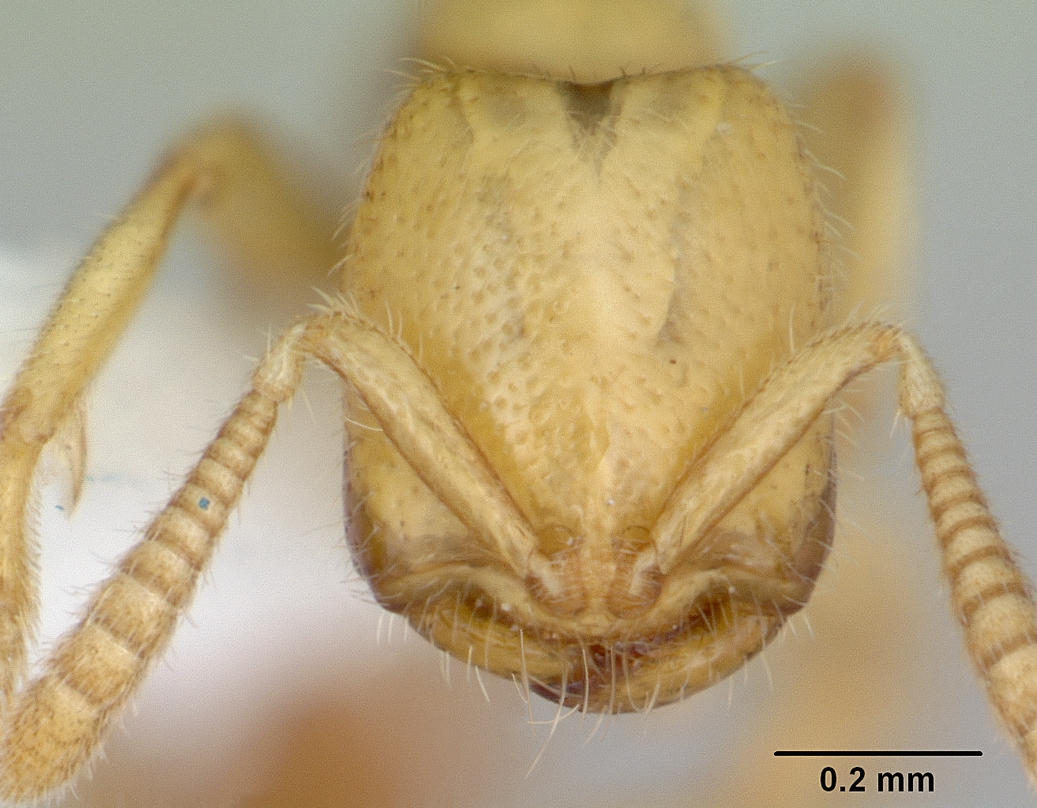
Head of a blind worker

Adetomyrma venatrix was described on the basis of specimens belonging to the worker caste collected from Zombitse Forest, in western Madagascar. The key characteristics of the species was the absence of a clear petiole when viewed from above due to the third abdominal tergite (the sclerite on the dorsal side) lacking a differentiated pretergite. The gaster is large and without constrictions. The ant is blind and has a long sting. It was placed with reservations in the tribe Amblyoponini as it lacks the typical characters of the group. Later studies considered them as being close to the ancestral members of the Amblyoponinae and they share certain morphological features with Amblyopone pluto such as the presence of laterosclerite.
