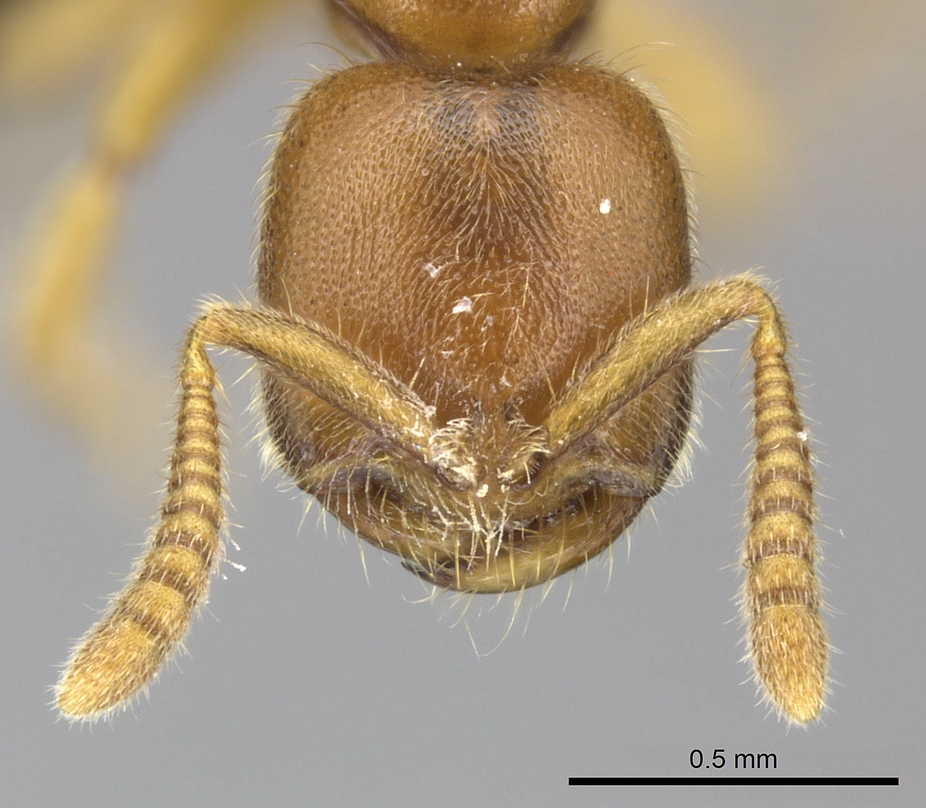

Scientific classification
- Kingdom: Animalia
- Phylum: Arthropoda
- Class: Insecta
- Order: Hymenoptera
- Family: Formicidae
- Genus: Adetomyrma
- Species: A. caputleae

Binomial name
- Adetomyrma caputleae Yoshimura & Fisher, 2012

= Adetomyrma caputleae =

Species of ant

Adetomyrma caputleae is a species of ant belonging to the genus Adetomyrma. They are endemic to Madagascar, where they are widespread.

The species was recently described by Yoshimurea & Fisher in 2012. Ants of this species are blind.
