= Adetomyrma goblin =

Scientific classification
- Kingdom: Animalia
- Phylum: Arthropoda
- Class: Insecta
- Order: Hymenoptera
- Family: Formicidae
- Genus: Adetomyrma
- Species: A. goblin

Binomial name
- Adetomyrma goblin Yoshimura & Fisher, 2012

Species of ant

Adetomyrma goblin is a species of ant that belongs to the genus Adetomyrma. They are native to Madagascar. The species was described in 2012 by Yoshimura & Fisher.
