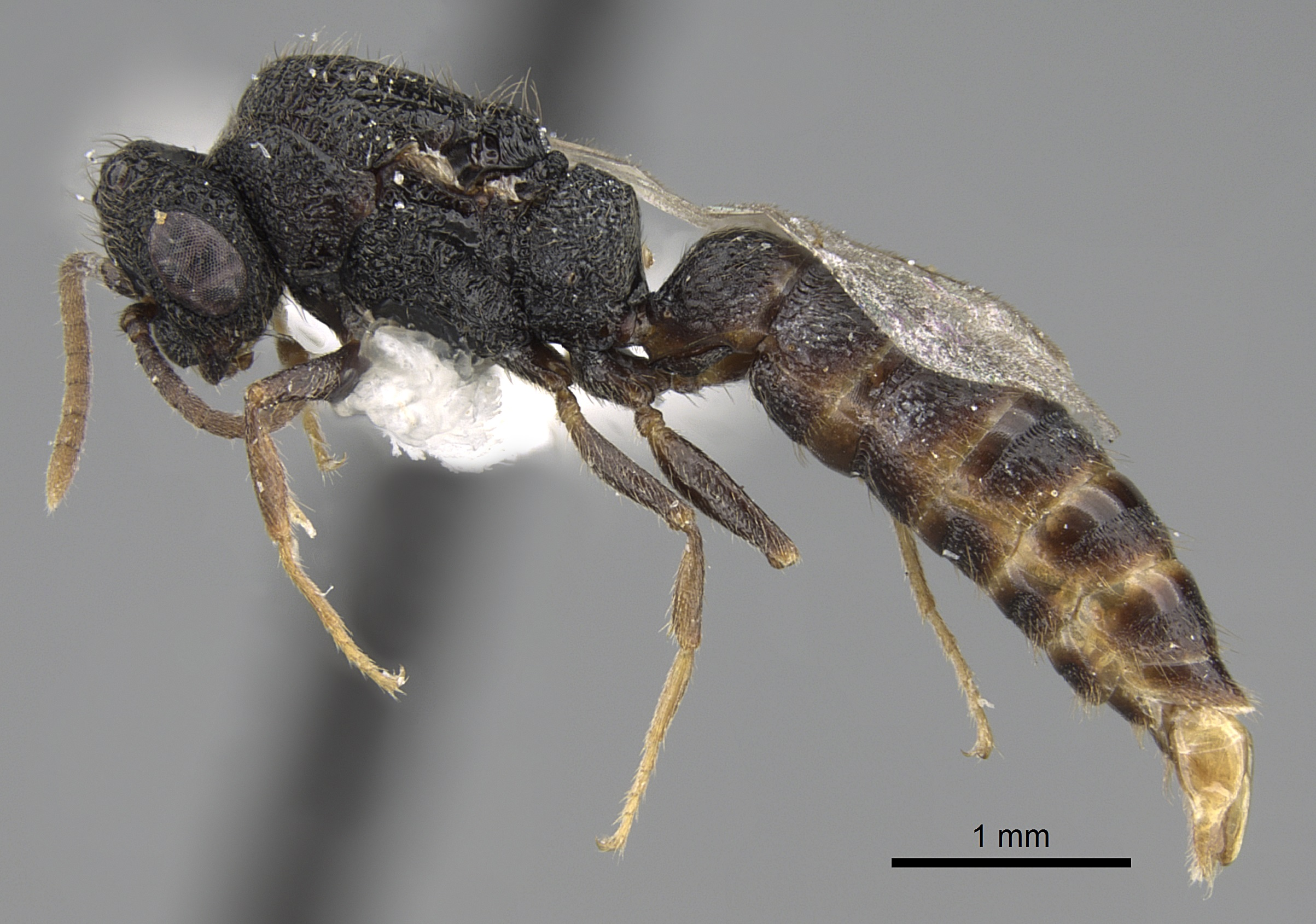
- Stigmatomma pluto male

Scientific classification
- Kingdom: Animalia
- Phylum: Arthropoda
- Clade: Pancrustacea
- Class: Insecta
- Order: Hymenoptera
- Family: Formicidae
- Genus: Stigmatomma
- Species: S. pluto

Binomial name
- Stigmatomma pluto (Gotwald & Levieux, 1972)

Synonyms
- Amblyopone pluto Gotwald & Levieux

= Stigmatomma pluto =

Species of ant

Stigmatomma pluto is a species of ant in the subfamily Amblyoponinae. The species was first described as Amblyopone pluto by Gotwald and Levieux in 1972 and moved to the genus Stigmatomma in 2012.

Stigmatomma pluto is endemic to the unburned savannas of central Ivory Coast.
