= Stigmatomma electrinum =

Stigmatomma electrinum Temporal range: Middle to Late Eocene Baltic amber

Scientific classification
- Kingdom: Animalia
- Phylum: Arthropoda
- Class: Insecta
- Order: Hymenoptera
- Family: Formicidae
- Genus: Stigmatomma
- Species: †S. electrinum

Binomial name
- †Stigmatomma electrinum (Dlussky, 2009)

Extinct species of ant

Stigmatomma electrinum is an extinct species of ant in the genus Stigmatomma. It was described in 2009 after fossils were found in the Baltic Amber.
