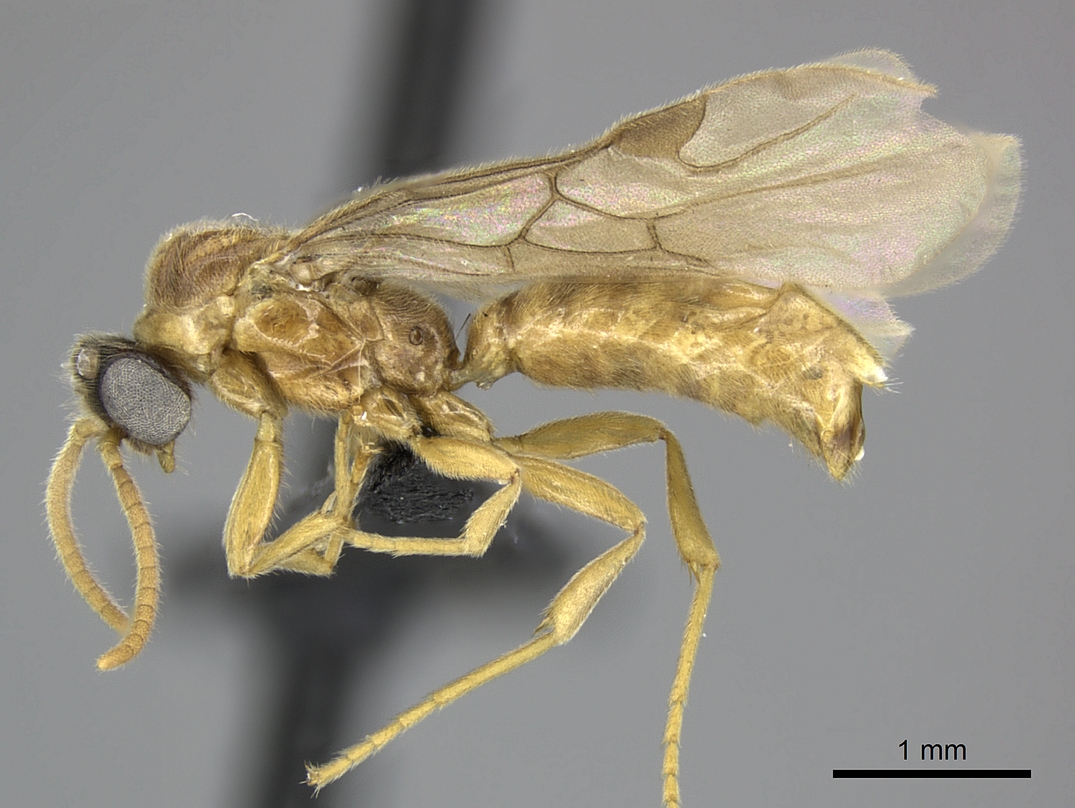

Scientific classification
- Kingdom: Animalia
- Phylum: Arthropoda
- Class: Insecta
- Order: Hymenoptera
- Family: Formicidae
- Genus: Adetomyrma
- Species: A. clarivida

Binomial name
- Adetomyrma clarivida Yoshimura & Fisher, 2012

= Adetomyrma clarivida =

Species of ant

Adetomyrma clarivida is a species of ant that belongs to the genus Adetomyrma. It is a blind species native to Madagascar. It was described by Yoshimura & Fisher in 2012.
