= Đông Thái =

Đông Thái Xã Đông Thái
- Rural commune
- Location within Vietnam
- Coordinates: 9°45′40″N 105°00′23″E
- Country: Vietnam
- Region: Mekong Delta
- Province: An Giang
- Time zone: UTC+7 (UTC + 7)

Đông Thái is a rural commune (xã) of An Giang Province, Vietnam.
