= Stigmatomma =

Scientific classification
- Kingdom: Animalia
- Phylum: Arthropoda
- Clade: Pancrustacea
- Class: Insecta
- Order: Hymenoptera
- Family: Formicidae
- Subfamily: Amblyoponinae
- Tribe: Amblyoponini
- Genus: Stigmatomma; Roger, 1859

Type species
- Stigmatomma denticulatum Roger, 1859

Diversity
- 58 species

Synonyms
- Arotropus Provancher, 1881; Bannapone Xu, 2000; Lithomyrmex Clark, 1928

Genus of ants

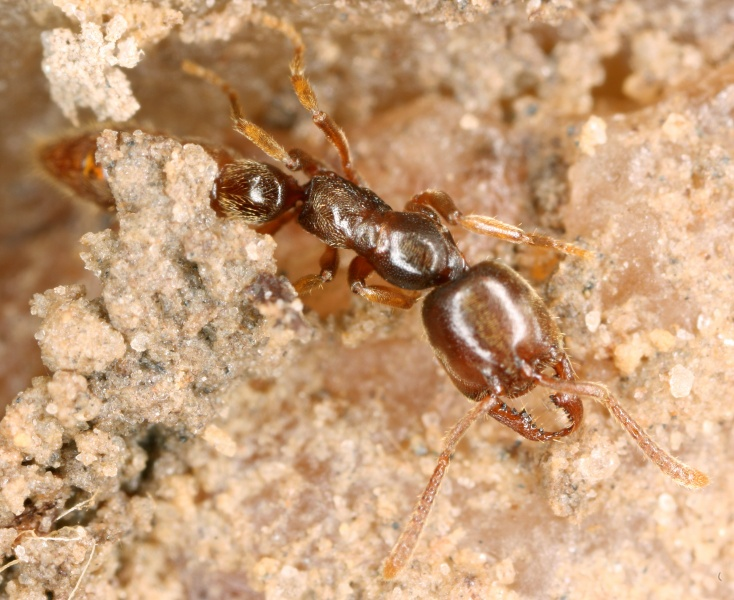
Stigmatomma trigonignathum

Stigmatomma is a genus of ants in the subfamily Amblyoponinae. The genus has a worldwide distribution, and like most other amblyoponines, Stigmatomma species are specialized predators. First described by Roger (1859), it was for a long time considered to be a synonym of Amblyopone until it was revived as an independent genus by Yoshimura & Fisher (2012) based on worker mandible morphology.

== Species ==
As of 2026, Stigmatomma contains 58 valid species, including 56 extant and two extinct.

=== Extant species ===
- Stigmatomma amblyops Karavaiev, 1935
- Stigmatomma annae (Arnol'di, 1968)
- Stigmatomma awa (Xu & Chu, 2012)
- Stigmatomma bellii (Forel, 1900)
- Stigmatomma besucheti (Baroni Urbani, 1978)
- Stigmatomma bolabola Esteves & Fisher, 2016
- Stigmatomma boltoni (Bharti & Wachkoo, 2011)
- Stigmatomma bruni Forel, 1912
- Stigmatomma caliginosum (Onoyama, 1999)
- Stigmatomma crenatum (Xu, 2001)
- Stigmatomma crypticum (Eguchi et al., 2015)
- Stigmatomma denticulatum Roger, 1859
- Stigmatomma draconis Hamer et al., 2023
- Stigmatomma emeryi Saunders, 1890
- Stigmatomma eminia (Zhou, 2001)
- Stigmatomma feae Emery, 1895
- Stigmatomma fulvidum (Terayama, 1987)
- Stigmatomma gaetulicum (Baroni Urbani, 1978)
- Stigmatomma impressifrons Emery, 1869
- Stigmatomma irayhady Esteves & Fisher, 2016
- Stigmatomma janovitsika Esteves & Fisher, 2016
- Stigmatomma kangba (Xu & Chu, 2012)
- Stigmatomma liebe Esteves & Fisher, 2016
- Stigmatomma luyiae Hsu et al., 2017
- Stigmatomma luzonicum Wheeler & Chapman, 1925
- Stigmatomma magnum Wimolsuthikul et al., 2025
- Stigmatomma meilianum (Xu & Chu, 2012)
- Stigmatomma minutum Forel, 1913
- Stigmatomma mulanae (Xu, 2000)
- Stigmatomma noonadan (Taylor, 1965)
- Stigmatomma normandi Santschi, 1915
- Stigmatomma octodentatum (Xu, 2006)
- Stigmatomma ophthalmicum (Baroni Urbani, 1978)
- Stigmatomma oregonense Wheeler, 1915
- Stigmatomma pagei Hamer et al., 2023
- Stigmatomma pallipes (Haldeman, 1844)
- Stigmatomma pertinax (Baroni Urbani, 1978)
- Stigmatomma pluto (Gotwald & Lévieux, 1972)
- Stigmatomma quadratum Karavaiev, 1935
- Stigmatomma reclinatum (Mayr, 1879)
- Stigmatomma roahady Esteves & Fisher, 2016
- Stigmatomma rothneyi (Forel, 1900)
- Stigmatomma rubiginoum (Wu & Wang, 1992)
- Stigmatomma sakaii (Terayama, 1989)
- Stigmatomma sakalava Esteves & Fisher, 2016
- Stigmatomma santschii Menozzi, 1922
- Stigmatomma scrobiceps (Guénard et al., 2013)
- Stigmatomma silvestrii Wheeler, 1928
- Stigmatomma testaceum (Motschoulsky, 1863)
- Stigmatomma trigonignathum (Brown, 1949)
- Stigmatomma trilobum (Xu, 2001)
- Stigmatomma tsyhady Esteves & Fisher, 2016
- Stigmatomma xui Bharti & Rilta, 2015
- Stigmatomma zaojun (Terayama, 2009)
- Stigmatomma zoma (Xu & Chu, 2012)
- Stigmatomma zwaluwenburgi Williams, 1946

=== Extinct species ===
- †Stigmatomma electrinum (Dlussky, 2009)
- †Stigmatomma groehni (Dlussky, 2009)
