= Stenobiini =

Scientific classification
- Kingdom: Animalia
- Phylum: Arthropoda
- Class: Insecta
- Order: Coleoptera
- Suborder: Polyphaga
- Infraorder: Cucujiformia
- Family: Cerambycidae
- Subfamily: Lamiinae
- Tribe: Stenobiini; Breuning, 1950

Tribe of beetles

Stenobiini is a tribe of longhorn beetles of the subfamily Lamiinae. It was described by Breuning in 1950.

== Taxonomy ==
- Aphalanthus Kolbe, 1894
- Emphreus Pascoe, 1864
- Plectroscapoides Teocchi, 1996
- Plectroscapus Gahan, 1890
- Stenobia Lacordaire, 1872
- Temnoscelis Chevrolat, 1855
- Temnosceloides Breuning & Téocchi, 1973
