= A. aberrans =

A. aberrans may refer to:

- Abacetus aberrans, a Tanzanian ground beetle
- Aberrasine aberrans, an Asian moth
- Acianthera aberrans, an orchid native to Costa Rica, Ecuador, and Panama
- Acridoschema aberrans, a longhorn beetle
- Acronychia aberrans, an Australian tree
- Actinotachina aberrans, a synonym of Lixophaga aberrans, a tachinid fly
- Adetus aberrans, a longhorn beetle
- Amblyopone aberrans, an Australian ant
- Anguillulina aberrans, a synonym of Nacobbus aberrans, a nematode that parasitizes plants
- Anhammus aberrans, a longhorn beetle known from Borneo and Malaysia
- Anisia aberrans, a tachinid fly
- Arhopala aberrans, an Indomalayan butterfly
- Athemistus aberrans, an Australian longhorn beetle
- Austrjapyx aberrans, a dipluran
