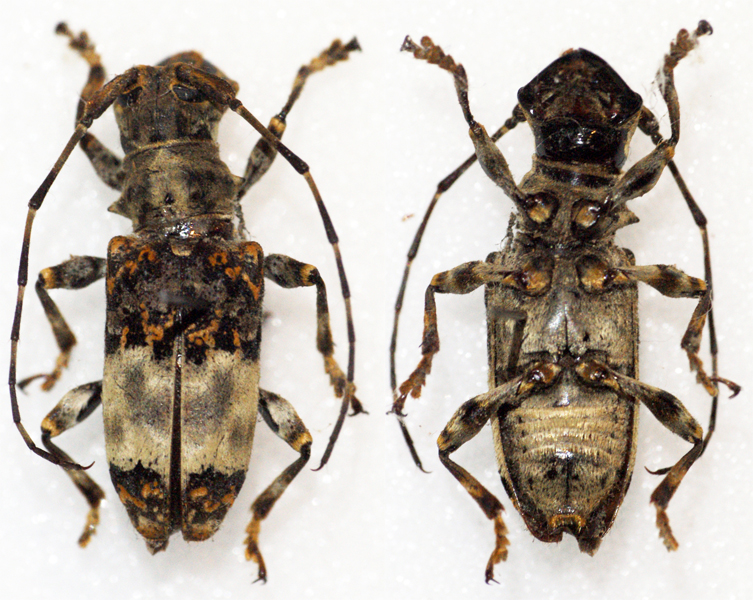
- Acmocera olympia

Scientific classification
- Domain: Eukaryota
- Kingdom: Animalia
- Phylum: Arthropoda
- Class: Insecta
- Order: Coleoptera
- Suborder: Polyphaga
- Infraorder: Cucujiformia
- Family: Cerambycidae
- Subfamily: Lamiinae
- Tribe: Acmocerini; Thomson, 1864

= Acmocerini =

Tribe of beetles

Acmocerini is a tribe of longhorn beetles of the subfamily Lamiinae. It was described by Thomson in 1864.

== Taxonomy ==
- Acmocera Dejean, 1835
- Acridocera Jordan, 1903
- Acridoschema Thomson, 1858
- Discoceps Jordan, 1894
- Fasciculacmocera Breuning, 1966
- Mimacmocera Breuning, 1960
