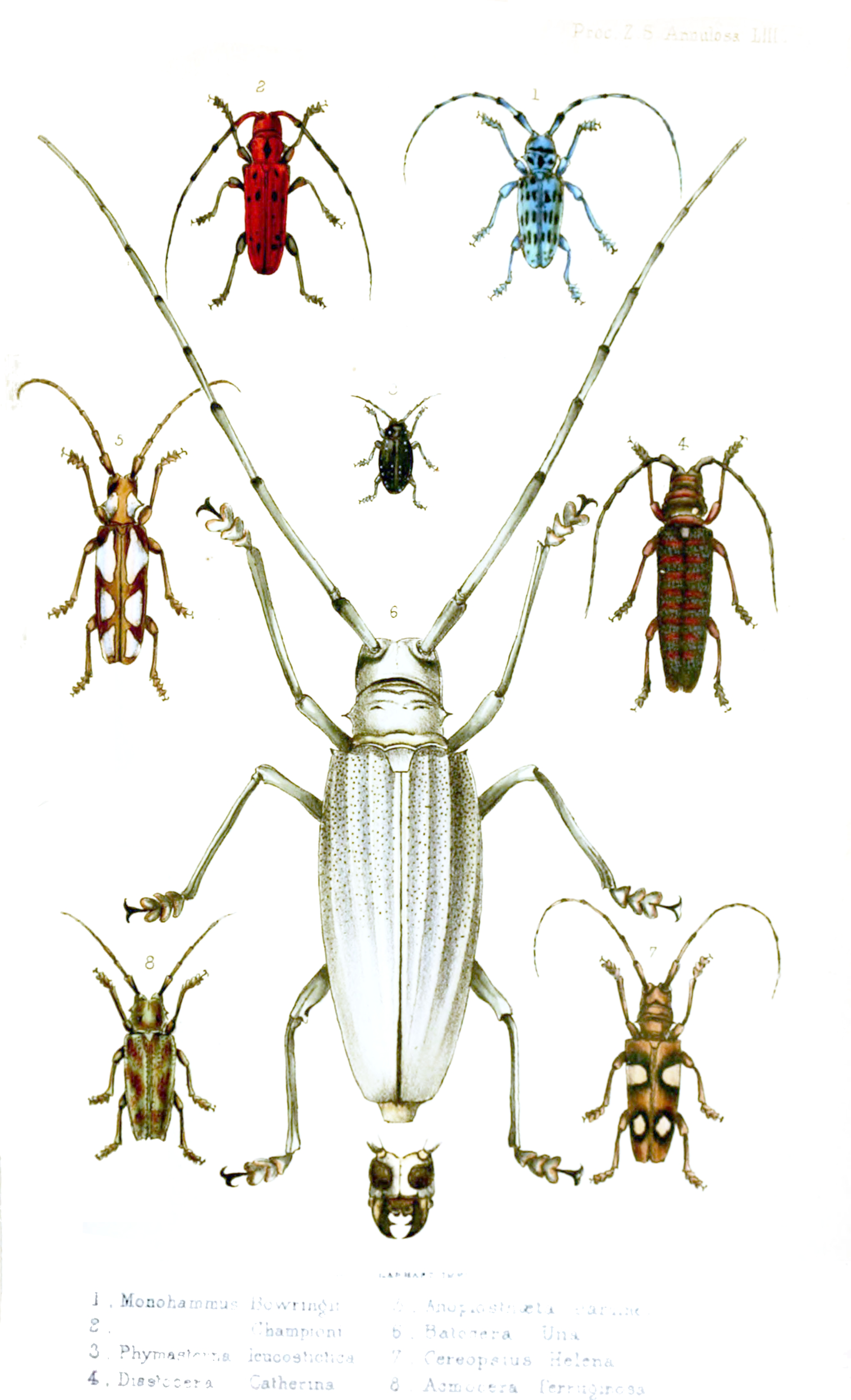
- Bottom left (8) is an emphreus ferruginosus

Scientific classification
- Domain: Eukaryota
- Kingdom: Animalia
- Phylum: Arthropoda
- Class: Insecta
- Order: Coleoptera
- Suborder: Polyphaga
- Infraorder: Cucujiformia
- Family: Cerambycidae
- Genus: Emphreus
- Species: E. ferruginosus

Binomial name
- Emphreus ferruginosus (White, 1858)

Synonyms
- Acmocera ferruginosa White, 1858; Baraeus sundewalli Fåhraeus, 1872

= Emphreus ferruginosus =

Species of beetle

Emphreus ferruginosus is a species of beetle in the family Cerambycidae. It was described by White in 1858, originally under the genus Acmocera.
