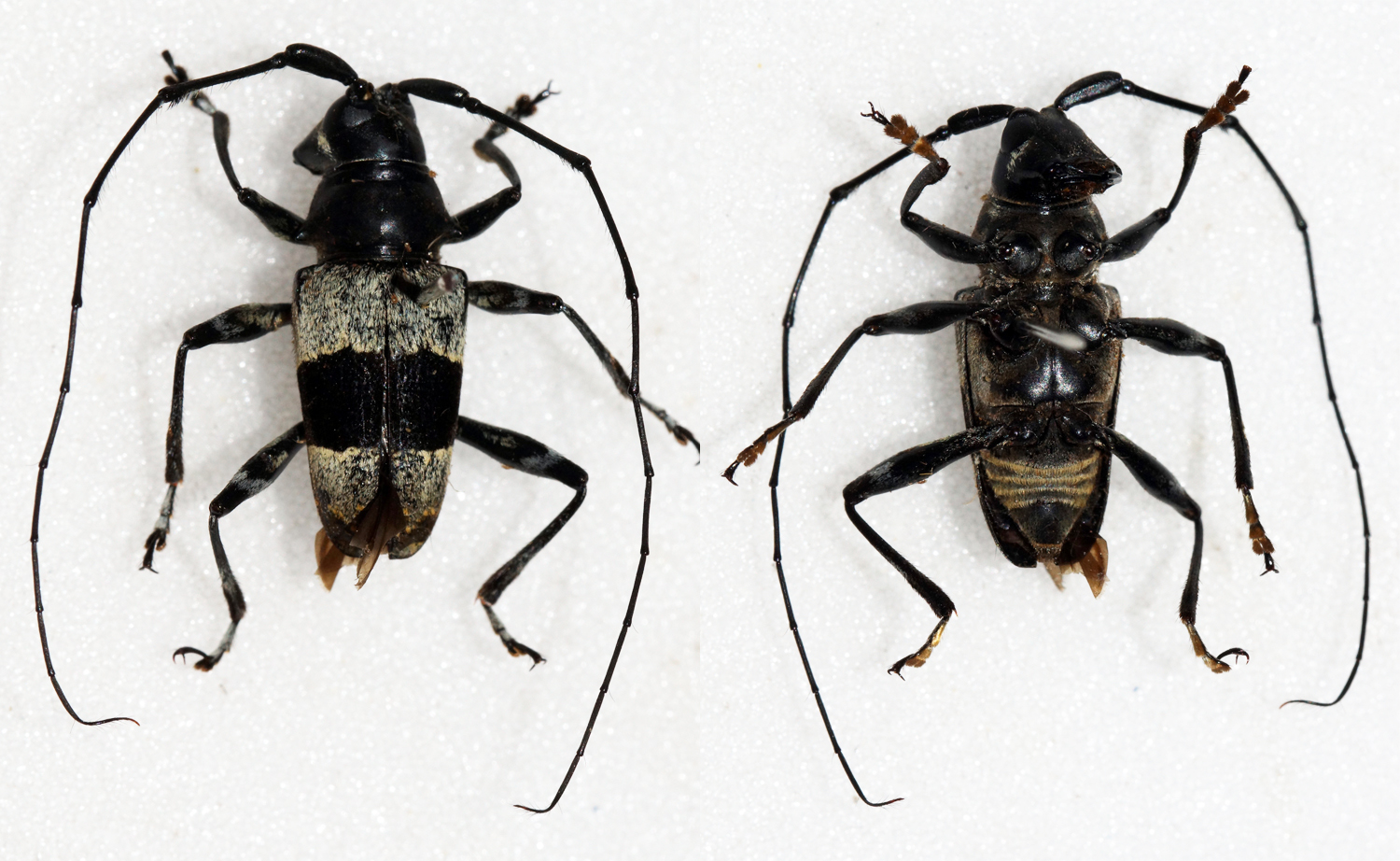

Scientific classification
- Kingdom: Animalia
- Phylum: Arthropoda
- Class: Insecta
- Order: Coleoptera
- Suborder: Polyphaga
- Infraorder: Cucujiformia
- Family: Cerambycidae
- Genus: Acridoschema
- Species: A. capricorne

Binomial name
- Acridoschema capricorne Thomson, 1858

Synonyms
- Acrydoschema unifasciata Thomson, 1858; Ceroplesis bimaculata Thomson, 1858; Acmocera convexa Jordan, 1894; Acmocera varians Jordan, 1894; Acridoschema atricollis Jordan, 1903; Acridoschema favareli Le Moult, 1938

= Acridoschema capricorne =

Species of beetle

Acridoschema capricorne is a species of beetle in the family Cerambycidae. It was described by Thomson in 1858.

== Subspecies ==
- Acridoschema capricorne capricorne
- Acridoschema capricorne atricolle Jordan, 1903
- Acridoschema capricorne convexum (Jordan, 1894)
- Acridoschema capricorne varians (Jordan, 1894)
