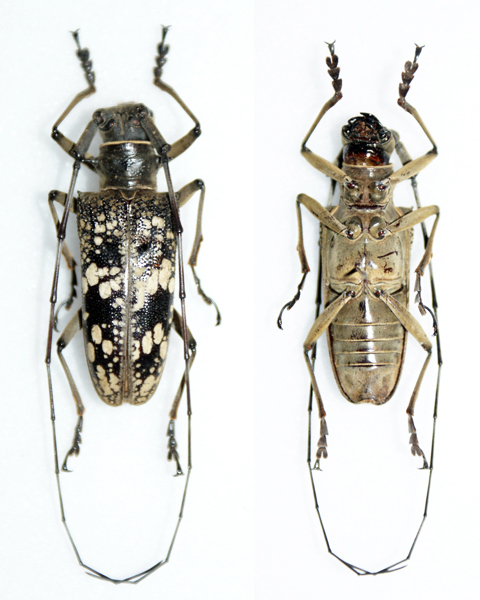
- Anhammus dalenii

Scientific classification
- Kingdom: Animalia
- Phylum: Arthropoda
- Class: Insecta
- Order: Coleoptera
- Suborder: Polyphaga
- Infraorder: Cucujiformia
- Family: Cerambycidae
- Tribe: Lamiini
- Genus: Anhammus

= Anhammus =

Genus of beetles

Anhammus is a genus of longhorn beetles of the subfamily Lamiinae, containing the following species:

- Anhammus aberrans Ritsema, 1881
- Anhammus dalenii (Guérin-Ménéville, 1844)
- Anhammus luzonicus Breuning, 1982
