= Athemistus monticola =

Scientific classification
- Domain: Eukaryota
- Kingdom: Animalia
- Phylum: Arthropoda
- Class: Insecta
- Order: Coleoptera
- Suborder: Polyphaga
- Infraorder: Cucujiformia
- Family: Cerambycidae
- Genus: Athemistus
- Species: A. monticola

Binomial name
- Athemistus monticola Blackburn, 1894

Species of beetle

Athemistus monticola is a species of beetle in the family Cerambycidae. It was described by Blackburn in 1894. It is known from Australia.
