= Emphreus adlbaueri =

Scientific classification
- Domain: Eukaryota
- Kingdom: Animalia
- Phylum: Arthropoda
- Class: Insecta
- Order: Coleoptera
- Suborder: Polyphaga
- Infraorder: Cucujiformia
- Family: Cerambycidae
- Genus: Emphreus
- Species: E. adlbaueri

Binomial name
- Emphreus adlbaueri Teocchi & Sudre, 2009

Species of beetle

Emphreus adlbaueri is a species of beetle in the family Cerambycidae. It was described by Pierre Téocchi and Jérôme Sudre in 2009. It is known from South Africa.
