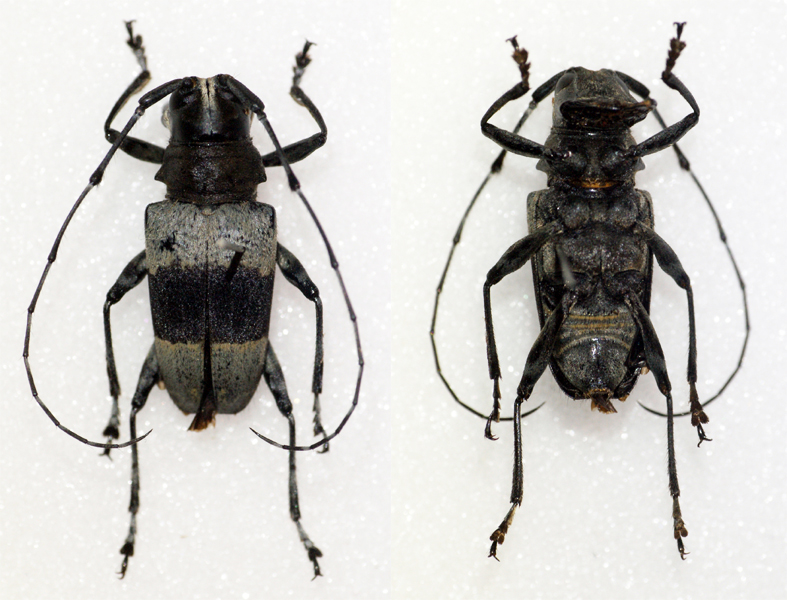
- Acridoschema ligata

Scientific classification
- Kingdom: Animalia
- Phylum: Arthropoda
- Class: Insecta
- Order: Coleoptera
- Suborder: Polyphaga
- Infraorder: Cucujiformia
- Family: Cerambycidae
- Tribe: Acmocerini
- Genus: Acridoschema; Thomson, 1858

= Acridoschema =

Genus of beetles

Acridoschema is a genus of longhorn beetles of the subfamily Lamiinae.

- Acridoschema aberrans (Jordan, 1894)
- Acridoschema capricorne Thomson, 1858
- Acridoschema flavolineatum Breuning, 1970
- Acridoschema isidori Chevrolat, 1858
- Acridoschema itzingeri Breuning, 1935
- Acridoschema ligatum Quedenfeldt, 1882
- Acridoschema thomense Jordan, 1903
- Acridoschema tuberculicolle (Breuning, 1950)
