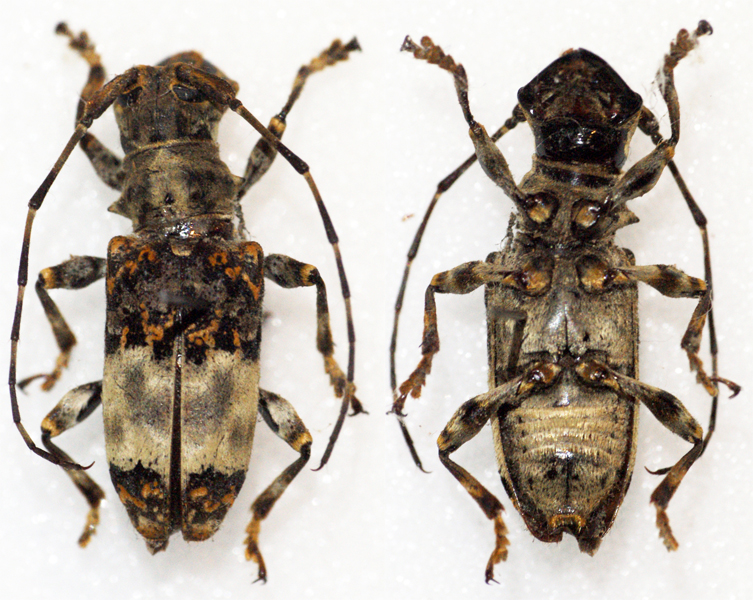

Scientific classification
- Domain: Eukaryota
- Kingdom: Animalia
- Phylum: Arthropoda
- Class: Insecta
- Order: Coleoptera
- Suborder: Polyphaga
- Infraorder: Cucujiformia
- Family: Cerambycidae
- Genus: Acmocera
- Species: A. olympiana

Binomial name
- Acmocera olympiana Thomson, 1858

= Acmocera olympiana =

Species of beetle

Acmocera olympiana is a species of beetle in the family Cerambycidae. It was described by Thomson in 1858.
