= Emphreus tuberculosus =

Scientific classification
- Domain: Eukaryota
- Kingdom: Animalia
- Phylum: Arthropoda
- Class: Insecta
- Order: Coleoptera
- Suborder: Polyphaga
- Infraorder: Cucujiformia
- Family: Cerambycidae
- Genus: Emphreus
- Species: E. tuberculosus

Binomial name
- Emphreus tuberculosus (Aurivillius, 1910)

Synonyms
- Phrynesthis tuberculosus Aurivillius, 1910

Species of beetle

Emphreus tuberculosus is a species of beetle in the family Cerambycidae. It was described by Per Olof Christopher Aurivillius in 1910, originally under the genus Phrynesthis.
