= Acmocera joveri =

Scientific classification
- Kingdom: Animalia
- Phylum: Arthropoda
- Class: Insecta
- Order: Coleoptera
- Suborder: Polyphaga
- Infraorder: Cucujiformia
- Family: Cerambycidae
- Genus: Acmocera
- Species: A. joveri

Binomial name
- Acmocera joveri Lepesme & Breuning, 1952

Species of beetle

Acmocera joveri is a species of beetle in the family Cerambycidae. It was described by Lepesme and Breuning in 1952.
