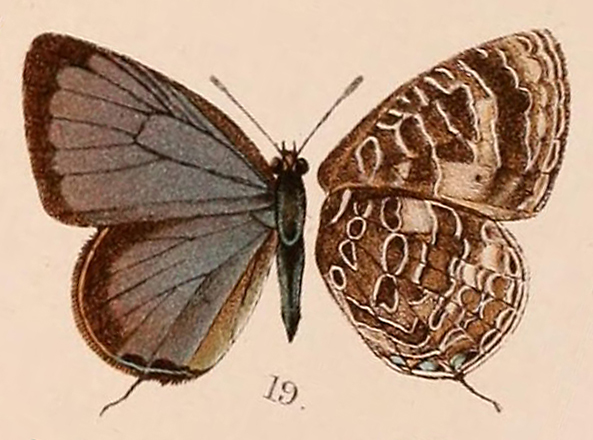
- Acesina arisba = Arhopala birmana, male, from original description by de Niceville, 1891.
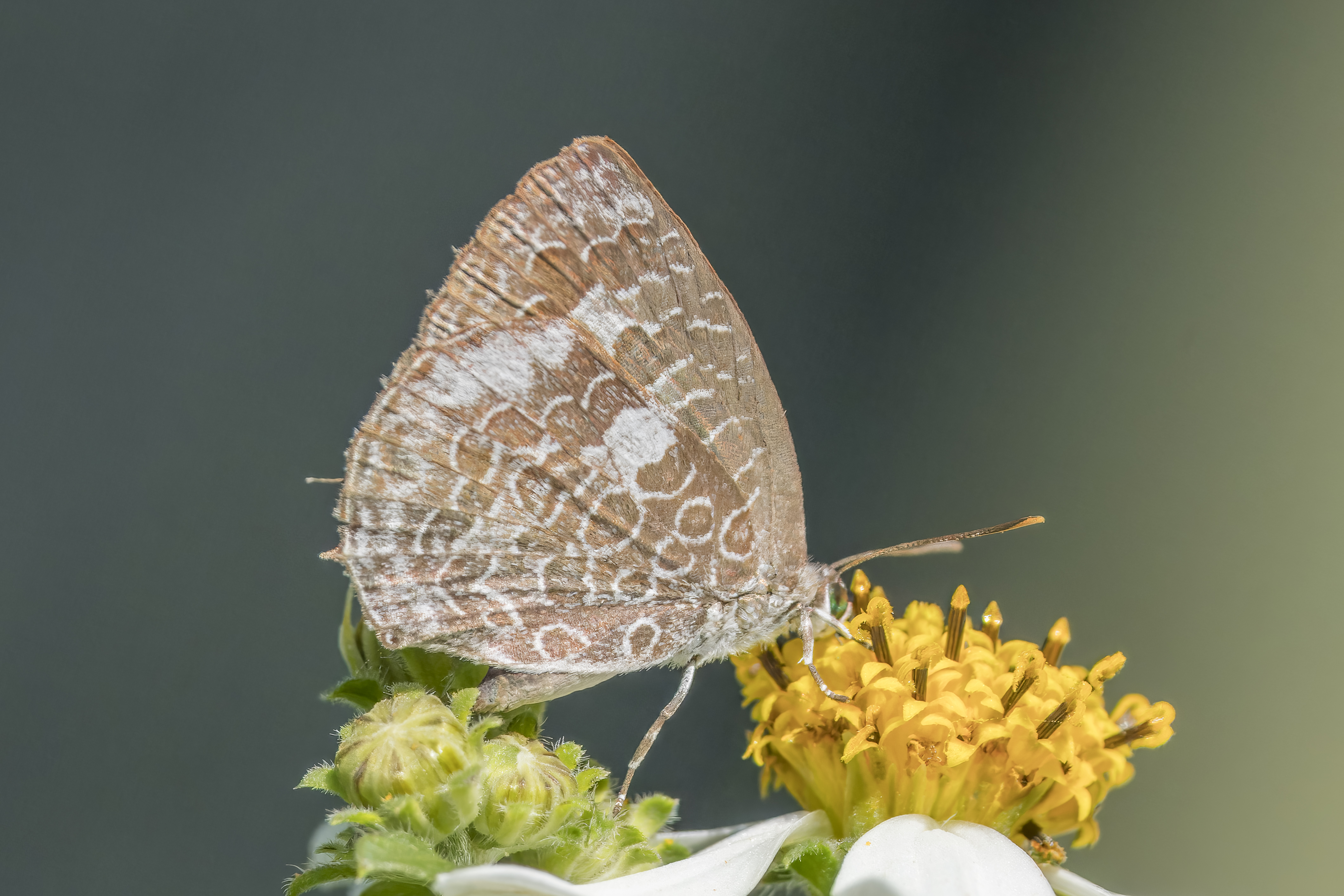
- A. b. asakurae, Taiwan

Scientific classification
- Kingdom: Animalia
- Phylum: Arthropoda
- Clade: Pancrustacea
- Class: Insecta
- Order: Lepidoptera
- Family: Lycaenidae
- Genus: Arhopala
- Species: A. birmana

Binomial name
- Arhopala birmana (Moore, 1883)

Synonyms
- Acesina arisba (Moore, 1884); Panchala birmana Moore, 1884; Acesina arisba de Nicéville, 1891

= Arhopala birmana =

Species of butterfly

Arhopala birmana, the Burmese bushblue, is a species of lycaenid or blue butterfly found in the Indomalayan realm.

The easternmost form of this species: corthata Fruhst. flying in Hongkong is presumably very closely allied to ariel. In corthata the upper surface of the male is dark, but intensely bluish-violet. Easily separable from typical birmana by the hindwing in which the dark marginal band is analwards narrower. - In typical birmana Mr. (= arisba Nic.) the postmedian band on the forewing beneath is still coherent, whereas in the larger form aberrans Nic. [ now species Arhopala aberrans (de Nicéville, [1889]) ] it is interrupted in the centre. In this form from Tenasserim the female has also much more white in the disc of the forewing above. The male of all the forms are above violettish-blue with a broader or narrower black margin.

== Subspecies ==
- Arhopala birmana birmana Assam, Burma, Thailand, Laos, Vietnam, Hong Kong
- Arhopala birmana asakurae (Matsumura, 1910) Taiwan
- Arhopala birmana hiurai (Hayashi, 1976) Palawan (Philippines)
