= Athemistus torridus =

Scientific classification
- Domain: Eukaryota
- Kingdom: Animalia
- Phylum: Arthropoda
- Class: Insecta
- Order: Coleoptera
- Suborder: Polyphaga
- Infraorder: Cucujiformia
- Family: Cerambycidae
- Genus: Athemistus
- Species: A. torridus

Binomial name
- Athemistus torridus Blackburn, 1894

Species of beetle

Athemistus torridus is a species of beetle in the family Cerambycidae. It was described by Blackburn in 1894. It is known from Australia.
