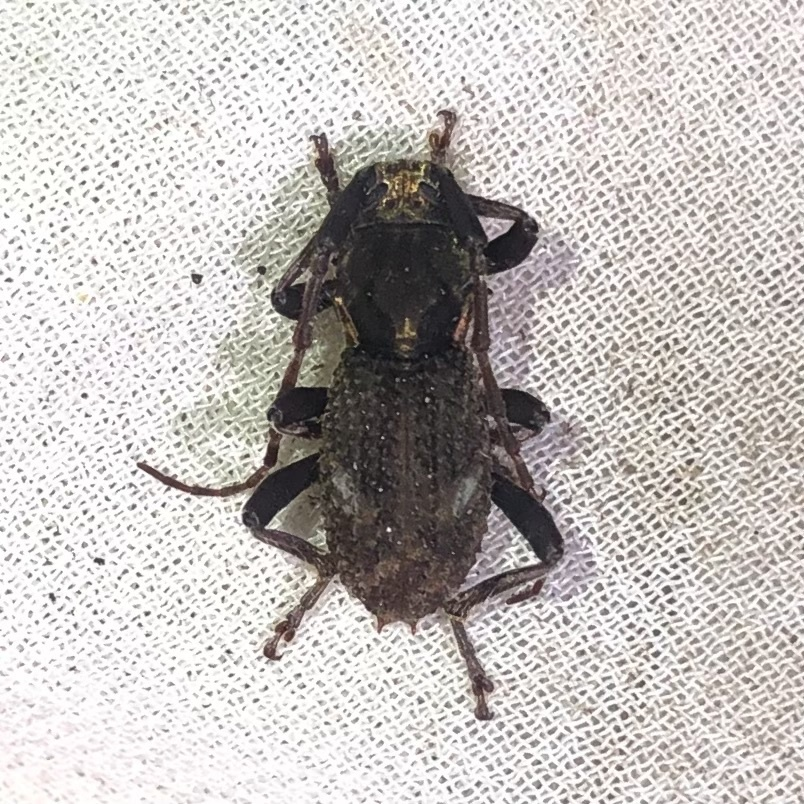

Scientific classification
- Domain: Eukaryota
- Kingdom: Animalia
- Phylum: Arthropoda
- Class: Insecta
- Order: Coleoptera
- Suborder: Polyphaga
- Infraorder: Cucujiformia
- Family: Cerambycidae
- Genus: Athemistus
- Species: A. howitti

Binomial name
- Athemistus howitti Pascoe, 1876

= Athemistus howitti =

Species of beetle

Athemistus howitti is a species of beetle in the family Cerambycidae. It was described by Francis Polkinghorne Pascoe in 1876. It is known from Australia.
