= Athemistus assimilis =

Scientific classification
- Kingdom: Animalia
- Phylum: Arthropoda
- Class: Insecta
- Order: Coleoptera
- Suborder: Polyphaga
- Infraorder: Cucujiformia
- Family: Cerambycidae
- Genus: Athemistus
- Species: A. assimilis

Binomial name
- Athemistus assimilis (Breuning, 1939)

Synonyms
- Hoplathemistus assimilis Breuning, 1939

Species of beetle

Athemistus assimilis is a species of beetle in the family Cerambycidae. It was described by Stephan von Breuning in 1939. It is known from Australia.

It is 11 mm long and 4 mm wide, and its type locality is Cooktown, Queensland.
