= Temnosceloides carnusi =

Scientific classification
- Kingdom: Animalia
- Phylum: Arthropoda
- Class: Insecta
- Order: Coleoptera
- Suborder: Polyphaga
- Infraorder: Cucujiformia
- Family: Cerambycidae
- Genus: Temnosceloides
- Species: T. carnusi

Binomial name
- Temnosceloides carnusi Meunier, Sudre & Téocchi, 2009

Species of beetle

Temnosceloides carnusi is a species of beetle in the family Cerambycidae. It was described by Meunier, Jérôme Sudre and Pierre Téocchi in 2009. It is known from Nigeria.
