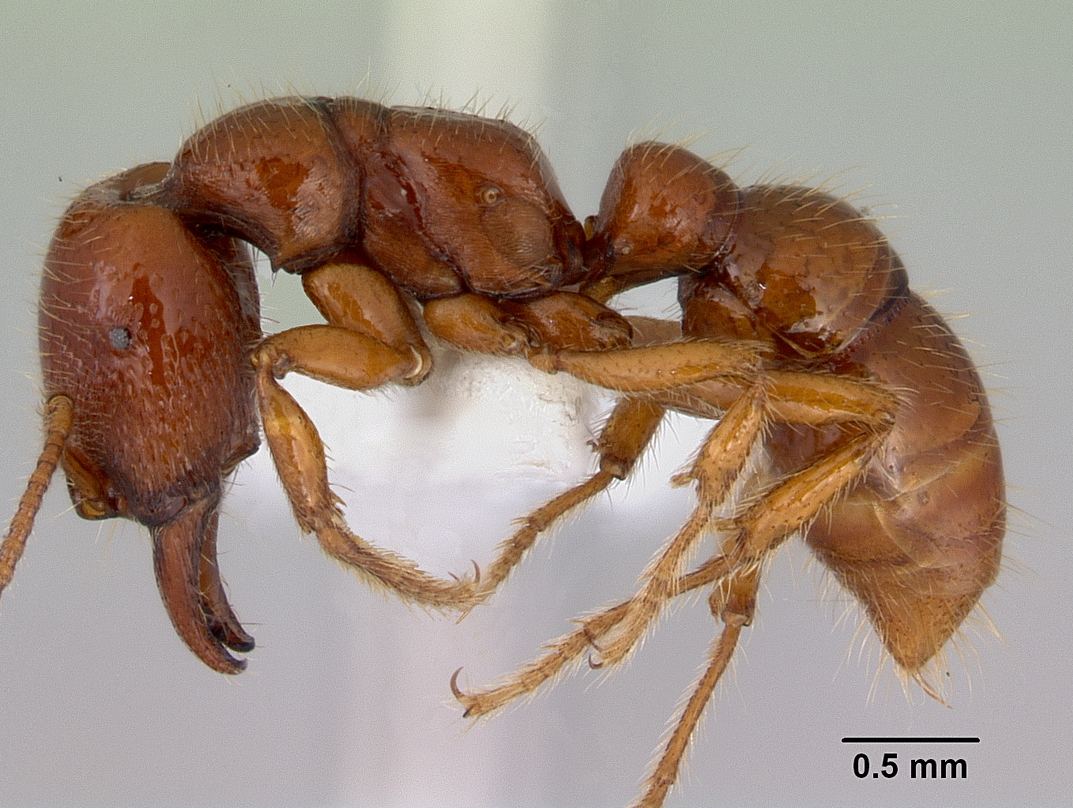
- Worker

Scientific classification
- Kingdom: Animalia
- Phylum: Arthropoda
- Class: Insecta
- Order: Hymenoptera
- Family: Formicidae
- Genus: Amblyopone
- Species: A. australis

Binomial name
- Amblyopone australis Erichson, 1842
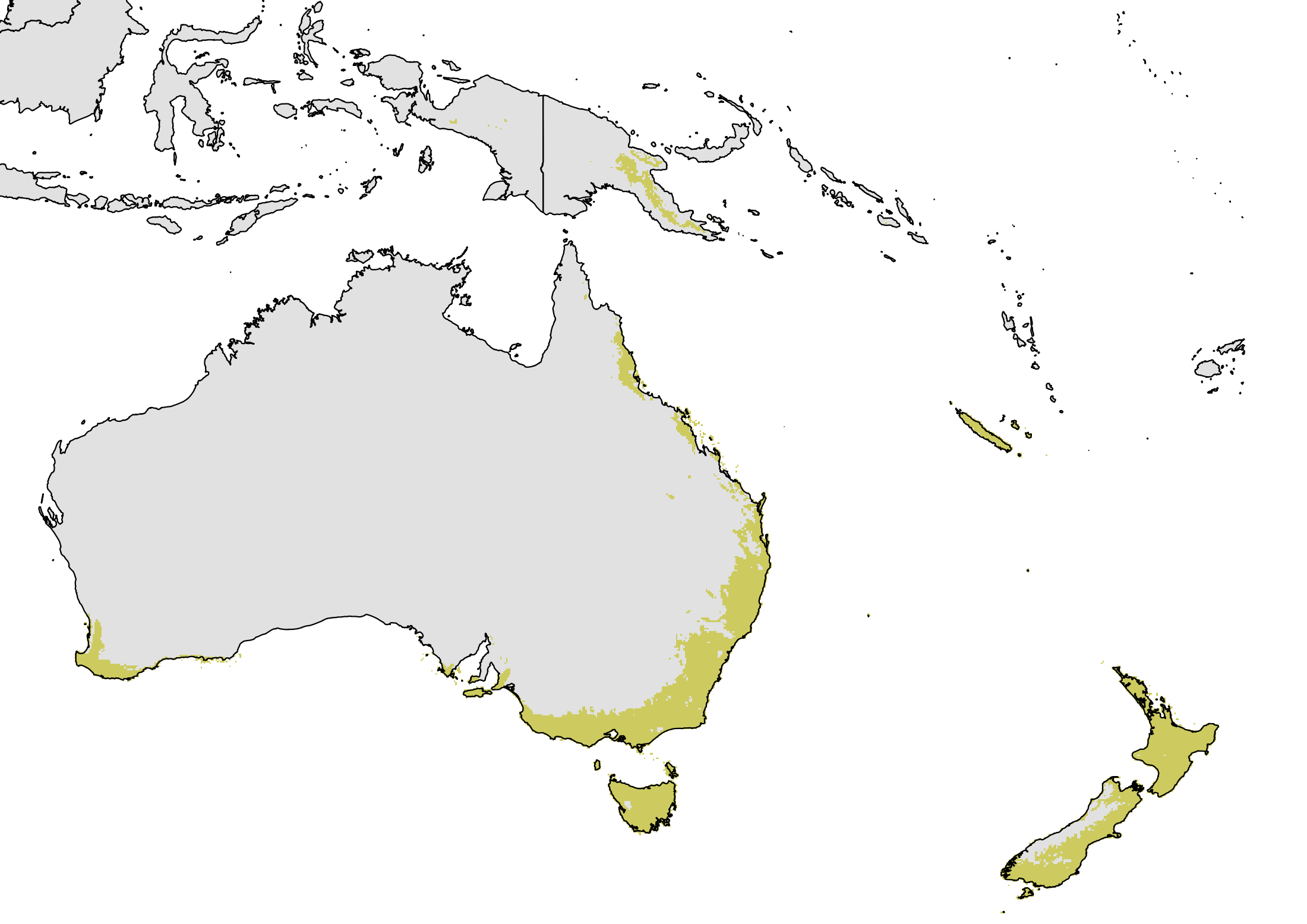

= Amblyopone australis =

Species of ant

Amblyopone australis, the southern Michelin ant, is a species of ant in the genus Amblyopone, native to Australia. The species was described by Wilhelm Ferdinand Erichson in 1842. Workers can vary in colour from yellow to dark brown or black. They have a body length of 4.5–8mm; queens are larger.

It has been accidentally introduced to New Zealand, where it has become widely established across the North Island. It is the largest ant species established in New Zealand.

== Biology ==
Amblyopone australis lives in relatively small colonies of tens to hundreds (up to 2000), typically under logs or stones. Adults forage above and below ground, preying upon other arthropods, paralysing them with their sting. Larvae are fed dismembered body parts of prey.
