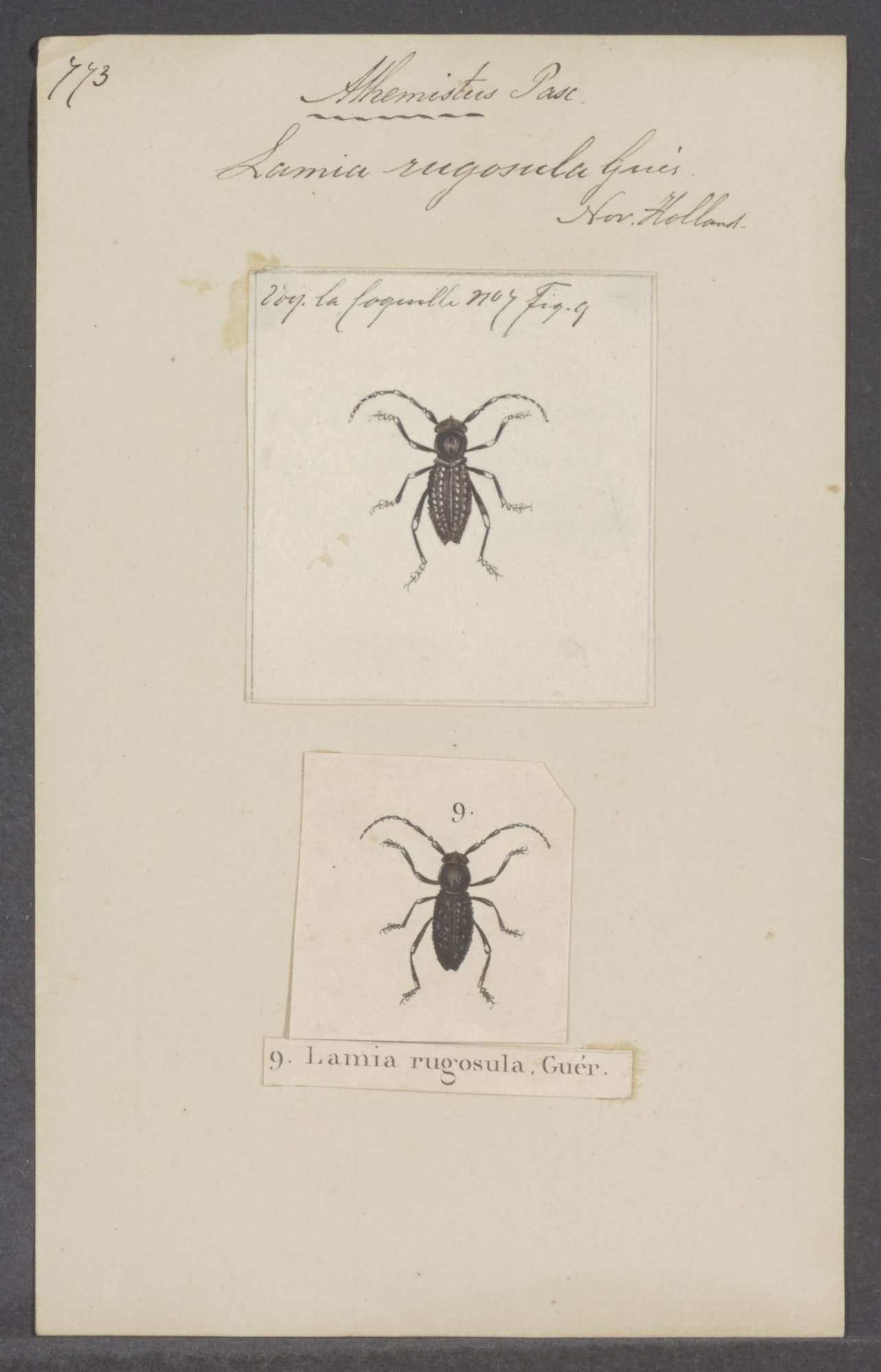

Scientific classification
- Domain: Eukaryota
- Kingdom: Animalia
- Phylum: Arthropoda
- Class: Insecta
- Order: Coleoptera
- Suborder: Polyphaga
- Infraorder: Cucujiformia
- Family: Cerambycidae
- Subfamily: Lamiinae
- Tribe: Parmenini
- Genus: Athemistus; Pascoe, 1859

Species
- See text

= Athemistus =

Genus of beetles

Athemistus is a genus of longhorn beetles of the subfamily Lamiinae, containing the following species:

subgenus Athemistus

- Athemistus aberrans Carter, 1932
- Athemistus aborigine Carter, 1926
- Athemistus aethiops Pascoe, 1867
- Athemistus approximates Carter, 1926
- Athemistus armitagei Pascoe, 1866
- Athemistus barretti Carter, 1926
- Athemistus bituberculatus Pascoe, 1867
- Athemistus cristatus Blackburn, 1894
- Athemistus dawsoni Breuning, 1970
- Athemistus funereus Pascoe, 1866
- Athemistus harrisoni Carter, 1926
- Athemistus howitti Pascoe, 1876
- Athemistus laevicollis Carter, 1926
- Athemistus luciae Carter, 1926
- Athemistus macleayi Carter, 1926
- Athemistus maculatus Carter, 1926
- Athemistus mastersi Carter, 1926
- Athemistus monticola Blackburn, 1894
- Athemistus murina (Breuning, 1940)
- Athemistus nodosus Carter, 1928
- Athemistus orbicollis Carter, 1937
- Athemistus pubescens Pascoe, 1862
- Athemistus puncticollis Pascoe, 1867
- Athemistus punctipennis Carter, 1926
- Athemistus rugulosus (Guérin-Méneville, 1831)
- Athemistus torridus Blackburn, 1894
- Athemistus tricolor Carter, 1926

subgenus Hoplathemistus

- Athemistus albofasciatus Aurivillius, 1917
- Athemistus assimilis Breuning, 1939
- Athemistus conifer Aurivillius, 1917
