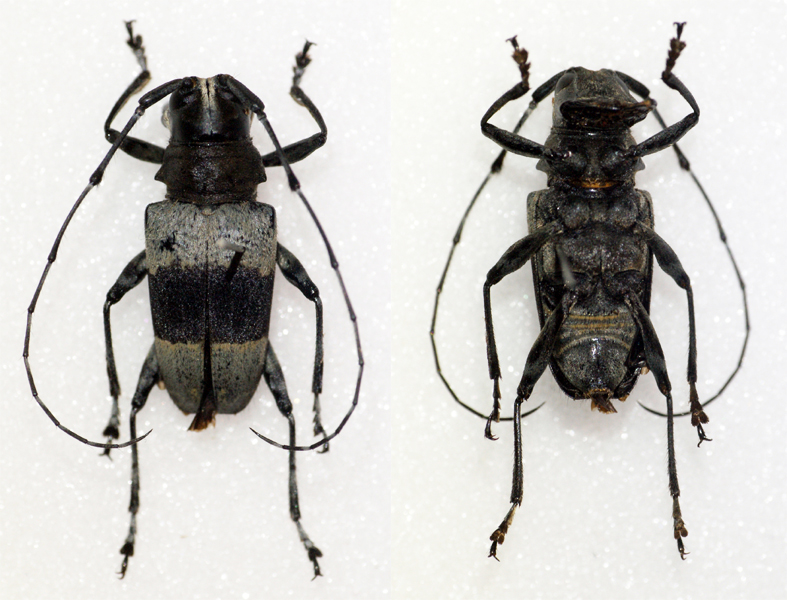

Scientific classification
- Domain: Eukaryota
- Kingdom: Animalia
- Phylum: Arthropoda
- Class: Insecta
- Order: Coleoptera
- Suborder: Polyphaga
- Infraorder: Cucujiformia
- Family: Cerambycidae
- Genus: Acridoschema
- Species: A. ligatum

Binomial name
- Acridoschema ligatum Quedenfeldt, 1882

= Acridoschema ligatum =

Species of beetle

Acridoschema ligatum is a species of beetle in the family Cerambycidae. It was described by Quedenfeldt in 1882.
