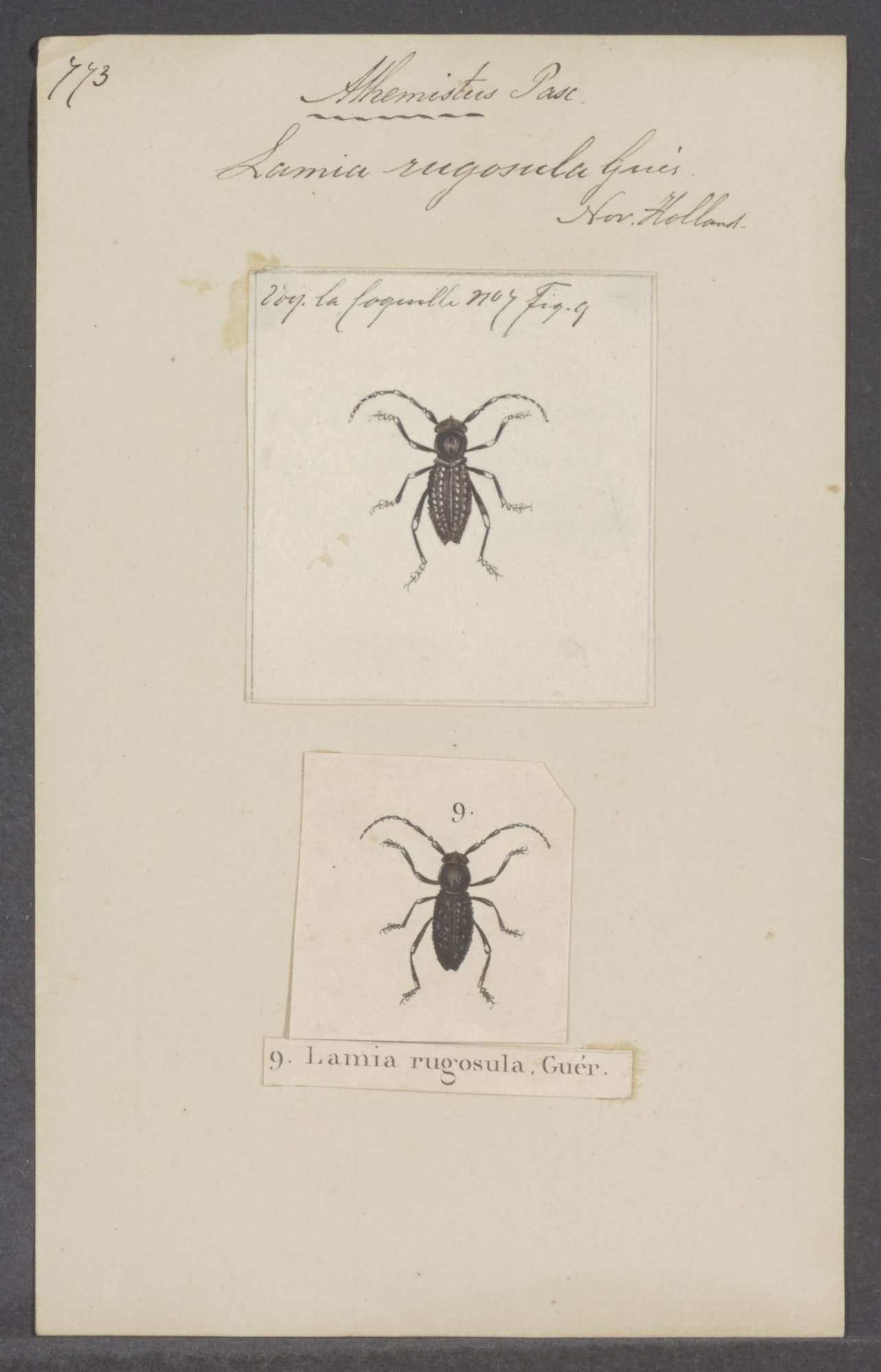

Scientific classification
- Kingdom: Animalia
- Phylum: Arthropoda
- Clade: Pancrustacea
- Class: Insecta
- Order: Coleoptera
- Suborder: Polyphaga
- Infraorder: Cucujiformia
- Family: Cerambycidae
- Genus: Athemistus
- Species: A. rugulosus

Binomial name
- Athemistus rugulosus (Guérin-Méneville, 1831)

= Athemistus rugulosus =

Species of beetle

Athemistus rugulosus is a species of beetle in the family Cerambycidae. It was described by Félix Édouard Guérin-Méneville in 1831. It is known from Australia.
