= Emphreus pachystoloides =

Scientific classification
- Domain: Eukaryota
- Kingdom: Animalia
- Phylum: Arthropoda
- Class: Insecta
- Order: Coleoptera
- Suborder: Polyphaga
- Infraorder: Cucujiformia
- Family: Cerambycidae
- Genus: Emphreus
- Species: E. pachystoloides

Binomial name
- Emphreus pachystoloides (Lacordaire, 1872)

Synonyms
- Phrynesthis pachystoloides Lacordaire, 1872

Species of beetle

Emphreus pachystoloides is a species of beetle in the family Cerambycidae. It was described by Lacordaire in 1872, originally under the genus Phrynesthis. It is known from Malawi, Mozambique, Kenya, Zimbabwe, the Democratic Republic of the Congo, and Zambia.
