= Acridoschema tuberculicolle =

Scientific classification
- Kingdom: Animalia
- Phylum: Arthropoda
- Class: Insecta
- Order: Coleoptera
- Suborder: Polyphaga
- Infraorder: Cucujiformia
- Family: Cerambycidae
- Genus: Acridoschema
- Species: A. tuberculicolle

Binomial name
- Acridoschema tuberculicolle (Breuning, 1950)

Species of beetle

Acridoschema tuberculicolle is a species of beetle in the family Cerambycidae. It was described by Breuning in 1950.
