= Athemistus nodosus =

Scientific classification
- Domain: Eukaryota
- Kingdom: Animalia
- Phylum: Arthropoda
- Class: Insecta
- Order: Coleoptera
- Suborder: Polyphaga
- Infraorder: Cucujiformia
- Family: Cerambycidae
- Genus: Athemistus
- Species: A. nodosus

Binomial name
- Athemistus nodosus Carter, 1928

Species of beetle

Athemistus nodosus is a species of beetle in the family Cerambycidae. It was described by Carter in 1928. It is known from Australia.
