= Athemistus murina =

Scientific classification
- Kingdom: Animalia
- Phylum: Arthropoda
- Class: Insecta
- Order: Coleoptera
- Suborder: Polyphaga
- Infraorder: Cucujiformia
- Family: Cerambycidae
- Genus: Athemistus
- Species: A. murina

Binomial name
- Athemistus murina (Breuning, 1940)

Synonyms
- Mimoparmena murina Breuning, 1940; Parmenomorpha murina Breuning, 1950; Parmenomorpha murina Breuning, 1961

Species of beetle

Athemistus murina is a species of beetle in the family Cerambycidae. It was described by Stephan von Breuning in 1940.
