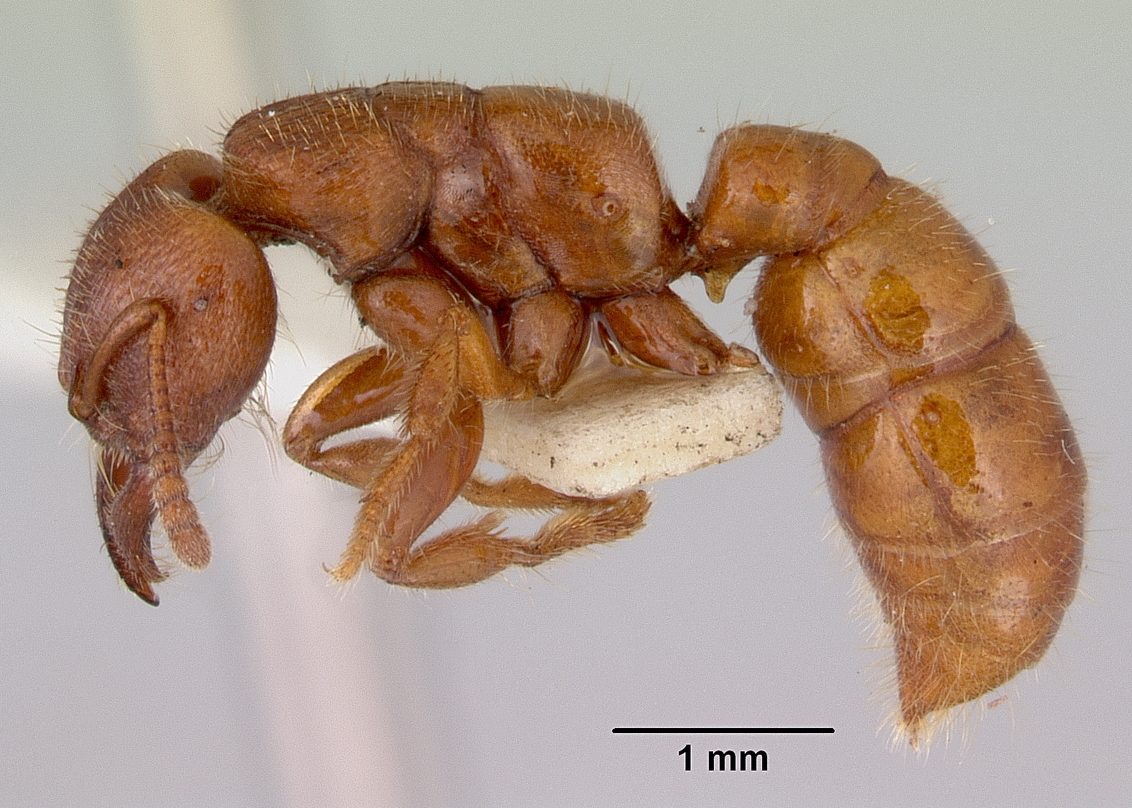
- Amblyopone clarki worker

Scientific classification
- Kingdom: Animalia
- Phylum: Arthropoda
- Clade: Pancrustacea
- Class: Insecta
- Order: Hymenoptera
- Family: Formicidae
- Genus: Amblyopone
- Species: A. clarki

Binomial name
- Amblyopone clarki Wheeler, 1927

= Amblyopone clarki =

Species of ant

Amblyopone clarki is an ant of the genus Amblyopone. Ants of this genus possess gamergates, meaning workers are able to reproduce within a colony lacking a queen. No subspecies are listed for Amblyopone clarki.

Amblyopone clarki is locally abundant on the sandy coastal plain north and south of Perth.
