= Emphreus =

Scientific classification
- Domain: Eukaryota
- Kingdom: Animalia
- Phylum: Arthropoda
- Class: Insecta
- Order: Coleoptera
- Suborder: Polyphaga
- Infraorder: Cucujiformia
- Family: Cerambycidae
- Tribe: Stenobiini
- Genus: Emphreus

Genus of beetles

Emphreus is a genus of longhorn beetles of the subfamily Lamiinae, containing the following species:

- Emphreus adlbaueri Teocchi & Sudre, 2009
- Emphreus ferruginosoides Breuning, 1971
- Emphreus ferruginosus (White, 1858)
- Emphreus lineatipennis Breuning, 1950
- Emphreus pachystoloides (Lacordaire, 1872)
- Emphreus rotundipennis Breuning, 1950
- Emphreus tuberculosus (Aurivillius, 1910)
- Emphreus wittei Breuning, 1954
