= Emphreus lineatipennis =

Scientific classification
- Kingdom: Animalia
- Phylum: Arthropoda
- Class: Insecta
- Order: Coleoptera
- Suborder: Polyphaga
- Infraorder: Cucujiformia
- Family: Cerambycidae
- Genus: Emphreus
- Species: E. lineatipennis

Binomial name
- Emphreus lineatipennis Breuning, 1950

Species of beetle

Emphreus lineatipennis is a species of beetle in the family Cerambycidae. It was described by Stephan von Breuning in 1950.
