= Acridoschema isidori =

Scientific classification
- Domain: Eukaryota
- Kingdom: Animalia
- Phylum: Arthropoda
- Class: Insecta
- Order: Coleoptera
- Suborder: Polyphaga
- Infraorder: Cucujiformia
- Family: Cerambycidae
- Genus: Acridoschema
- Species: A. isidori

Binomial name
- Acridoschema isidori Chevrolat, 1858

Species of beetle

Acridoschema isidori is a species of beetle in the family Cerambycidae. It was described by Louis Alexandre Auguste Chevrolat in 1858.
