= Acridocera =

Scientific classification
- Domain: Eukaryota
- Kingdom: Animalia
- Phylum: Arthropoda
- Class: Insecta
- Order: Coleoptera
- Suborder: Polyphaga
- Infraorder: Cucujiformia
- Family: Cerambycidae
- Tribe: Acmocerini
- Genus: Acridocera
- Species: A. ziczac

Binomial name
- Acridocera ziczac Jordan, 1903

Genus of beetles

Acridocera is a genus of beetles in the family Cerambycidae, containing a single species, Acridocera ziczac. It was described by Karl Jordan in 1903.
