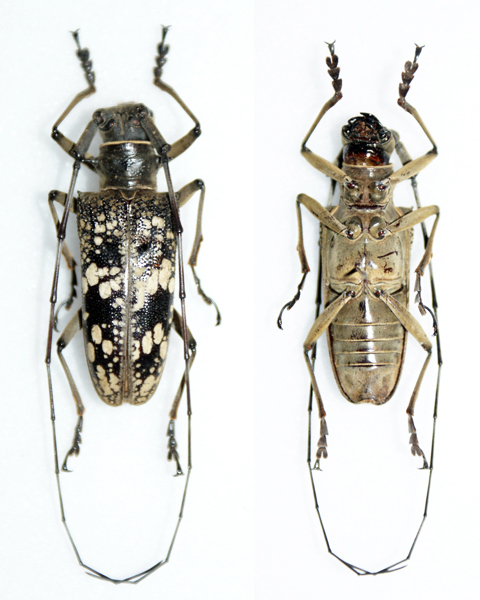
- Guérin-Méneville,1844 Sex: Female Data: 09-2006 - West Java - Indonesia

Scientific classification
- Kingdom: Animalia
- Phylum: Arthropoda
- Clade: Pancrustacea
- Class: Insecta
- Order: Coleoptera
- Suborder: Polyphaga
- Infraorder: Cucujiformia
- Family: Cerambycidae
- Genus: Anhammus
- Species: A. dalenii

Binomial name
- Anhammus dalenii (Guérin-Méneville, 1844)

Synonyms
- Monochamus dalenii Guérin-Méneville, 1844; Monochamus dejeanii Thomson, 1857; Anhammus daleni (Guérin-Méneville, 1844) (misspelling)

= Anhammus dalenii =

Species of beetle

Anhammus dalenii is a species of beetle in the family Cerambycidae. It was described by Félix Édouard Guérin-Méneville in 1844 originally under the genus Monochamus. It is known from Malaysia, Java, and Sumatra.

== Subspecies ==
- Anhammus dalenii borneensis deJong, 1942
- Anhammus dalenii dalenii (Guérin-Méneville, 1844)
- Anhammus dalenii malayanus Hayashi, 1975
- Anhammus dalenii tessellatus Heller, 1926
