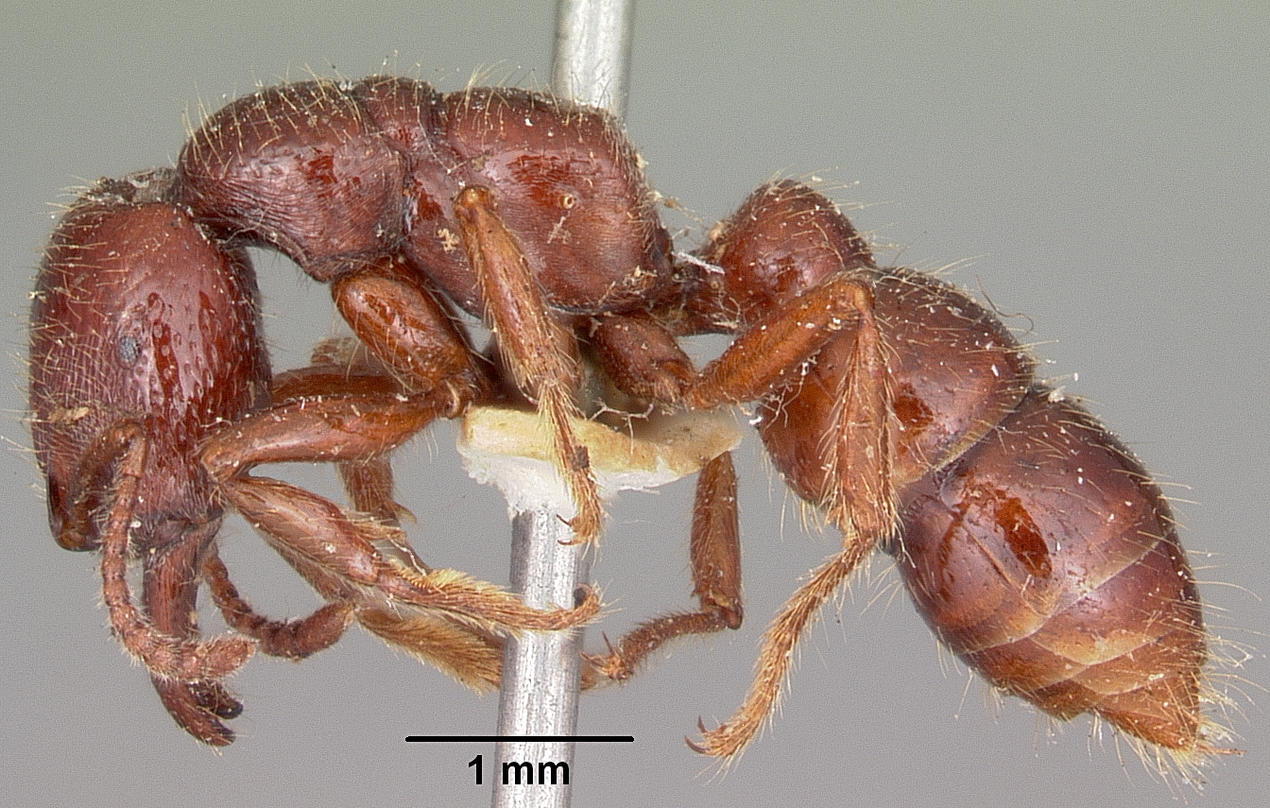
- Amblyopone australis worker

Scientific classification
- Kingdom: Animalia
- Phylum: Arthropoda
- Class: Insecta
- Order: Hymenoptera
- Family: Formicidae
- Subfamily: Amblyoponinae
- Tribe: Amblyoponini
- Genus: Amblyopone; Erichson, 1842

Type species
- Amblyopone australis Erichson, 1842

Diversity
- 10 species

Synonyms
- Amblyopopona Schulz, 1906; Amblyopopone Dalla Torre, 1893; Neoamblyopone Wheeler, 1927; Protamblyopone Wheeler, 1927

= Amblyopone =

Genus of ants

Amblyopone is a genus of 10 species of ants, found in Australia, New Caledonia, New Guinea and New Zealand. Ants of this genus possess gamergates, meaning workers are able to reproduce within a colony lacking a queen.

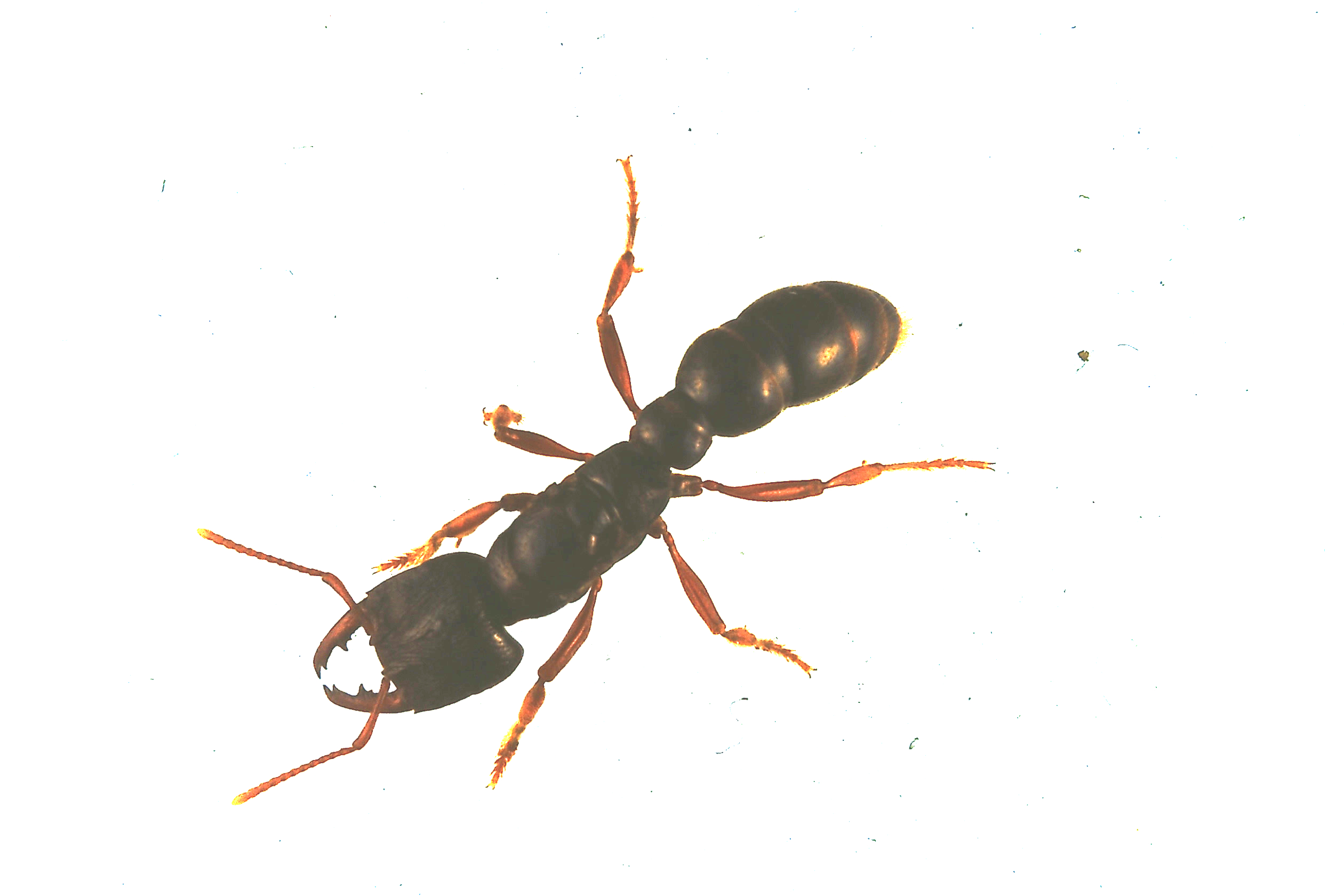
Living specimen of Amblyopone from Auckland New Zealand about 20mm long

== Species ==
- Amblyopone aberrans Wheeler, 1927
- Amblyopone australis Erichson, 1842
- Amblyopone clarki Wheeler, 1927
- Amblyopone ferruginea Smith, 1858
- Amblyopone gingivalis Brown, 1960
- Amblyopone hackeri Wheeler, 1927
- Amblyopone leae Wheeler, 1927
- Amblyopone longidens Forel, 1910
- Amblyopone mercovichi Brown, 1960
- Amblyopone michaelseni Forel, 1907
