= Acridoschema flavolineatum =

Scientific classification
- Kingdom: Animalia
- Phylum: Arthropoda
- Class: Insecta
- Order: Coleoptera
- Suborder: Polyphaga
- Infraorder: Cucujiformia
- Family: Cerambycidae
- Genus: Acridoschema
- Species: A. flavolineatum

Binomial name
- Acridoschema flavolineatum Breuning, 1970

Species of beetle

Acridoschema flavolineatum is a species of beetle in the family Cerambycidae. It was described by Stephan von Breuning in 1970.
