= Emphreus ferruginosoides =

Scientific classification
- Kingdom: Animalia
- Phylum: Arthropoda
- Class: Insecta
- Order: Coleoptera
- Suborder: Polyphaga
- Infraorder: Cucujiformia
- Family: Cerambycidae
- Genus: Emphreus
- Species: E. ferruginosoides

Binomial name
- Emphreus ferruginosoides Breuning, 1971

Species of beetle

Emphreus ferruginosoides is a species of beetle in the family Cerambycidae. It was described by Stephan von Breuning in 1971.
