= Temnosceloides hamifer =

Scientific classification
- Kingdom: Animalia
- Phylum: Arthropoda
- Class: Insecta
- Order: Coleoptera
- Suborder: Polyphaga
- Infraorder: Cucujiformia
- Family: Cerambycidae
- Genus: Temnosceloides
- Species: T. hamifer

Binomial name
- Temnosceloides hamifer Aurivillius, 1907

Synonyms
- Abaraeus hamifer Aurivillius, 1907; Temnosceloides excavatipennis Breuning & Téocchi, 1973

Species of beetle

Temnosceloides hamifer is a species of beetle in the family Cerambycidae. It was described by Per Olof Christopher Aurivillius in 1907. It is known from the Democratic Republic of the Congo, the Central African Republic, Cameroon, and Gabon.
