= Plectroscapoides =

Scientific classification
- Kingdom: Animalia
- Phylum: Arthropoda
- Class: Insecta
- Order: Coleoptera
- Suborder: Polyphaga
- Infraorder: Cucujiformia
- Family: Cerambycidae
- Genus: Plectroscapoides
- Species: P. multituberculatus

Binomial name
- Plectroscapoides multituberculatus Teocchi, 1996

Genus of beetles

Plectroscapoides multituberculatus is a species of beetle in the family Cerambycidae, and the only species in the genus Plectroscapoides. It was described by Teocchi in 1996.
