= Aphalanthus =

Scientific classification
- Kingdom: Animalia
- Phylum: Arthropoda
- Class: Insecta
- Order: Coleoptera
- Suborder: Polyphaga
- Infraorder: Cucujiformia
- Family: Cerambycidae
- Genus: Aphalanthus
- Species: A. conradti

Binomial name
- Aphalanthus conradti Kolbe, 1894

Genus of beetles

Aphalanthus conradti is a species of beetle in the family Cerambycidae, and the only species in the genus Aphalanthus. It was described by Kolbe in 1894.
