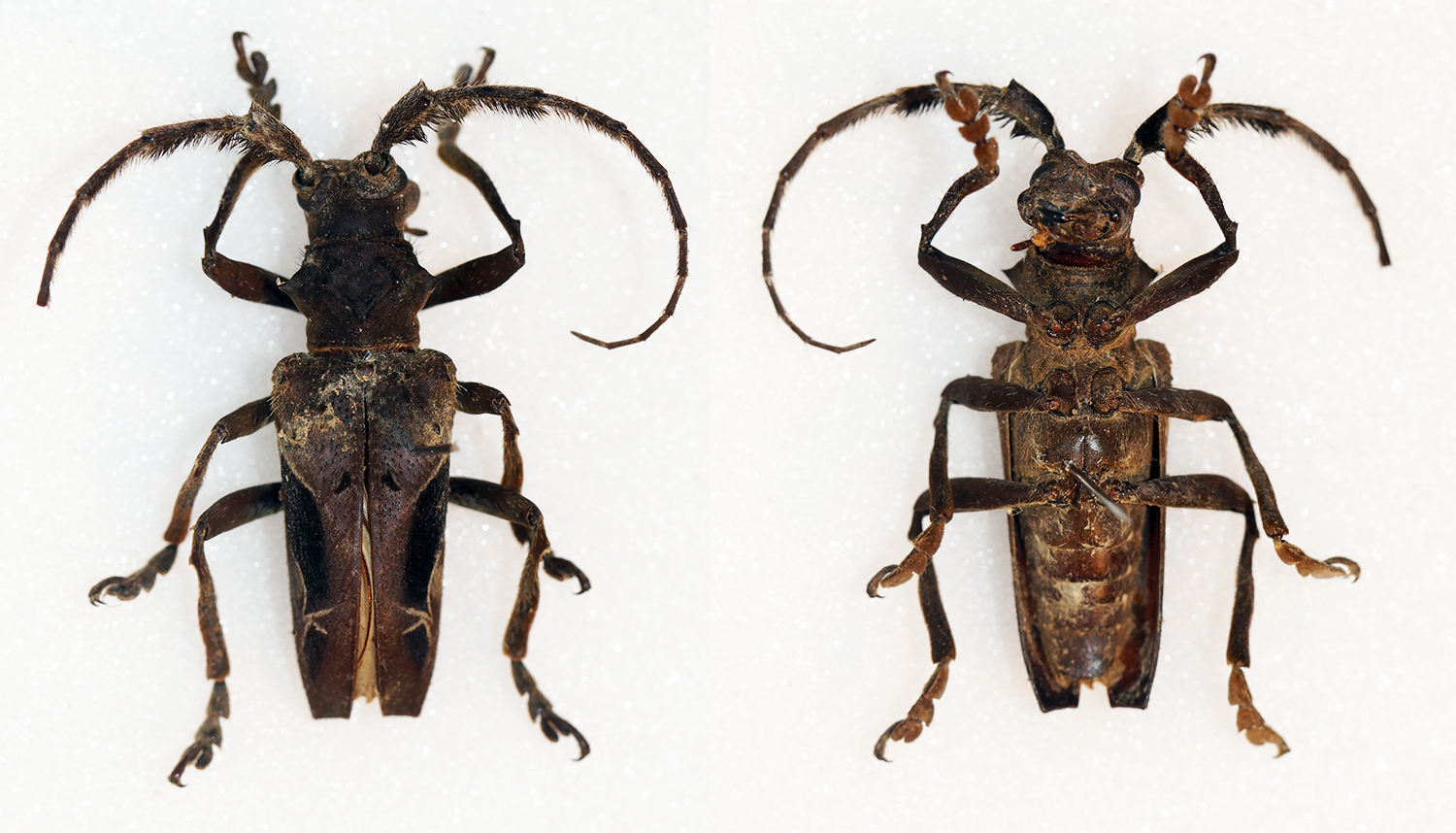

Scientific classification
- Kingdom: Animalia
- Phylum: Arthropoda
- Class: Insecta
- Order: Coleoptera
- Suborder: Polyphaga
- Infraorder: Cucujiformia
- Family: Cerambycidae
- Genus: Temnoscelis
- Species: T. waddeli

Binomial name
- Temnoscelis waddeli Chevrolat, 1855

= Temnoscelis =

Genus of beetles

Temnoscelis waddeli is a species of beetle in the family Cerambycidae, and the only species in the genus Temnoscelis. It was described by Louis Alexandre Auguste Chevrolat in 1855.
