= Temnosceloides =

Scientific classification
- Kingdom: Animalia
- Phylum: Arthropoda
- Class: Insecta
- Order: Coleoptera
- Suborder: Polyphaga
- Infraorder: Cucujiformia
- Family: Cerambycidae
- Subfamily: Lamiinae
- Genus: Temnosceloides

Genus of beetles

Temnosceloides is a genus of longhorn beetles of the subfamily Lamiinae, containing the following species:

- Temnosceloides carnusi Meunier, Sudre & Téocchi, 2009
- Temnosceloides hamifer Breuning & Téocchi, 1973
