= Mimacmocera =

Scientific classification
- Kingdom: Animalia
- Phylum: Arthropoda
- Class: Insecta
- Order: Coleoptera
- Suborder: Polyphaga
- Infraorder: Cucujiformia
- Family: Cerambycidae
- Genus: Mimacmocera
- Species: M. coerulea

Binomial name
- Mimacmocera coerulea Breuning, 1960

Genus of beetles

Mimacmocera coerulea is a species of beetle in the family Cerambycidae, and the only species in the genus Mimacmocera. It was described by Breuning in 1960.
