= Anhammus aberrans =

Scientific classification
- Kingdom: Animalia
- Phylum: Arthropoda
- Class: Insecta
- Order: Coleoptera
- Suborder: Polyphaga
- Infraorder: Cucujiformia
- Family: Cerambycidae
- Genus: Anhammus
- Species: A. aberrans

Binomial name
- Anhammus aberrans Ritsema, 1881

Synonyms
- Monochamus aberrans (Ritsema, 1881)

Species of beetle

Anhammus aberrans is a species of beetle in the family Cerambycidae. It was described by Coenraad Ritsema in 1881. It is known from Borneo and Malaysia.
