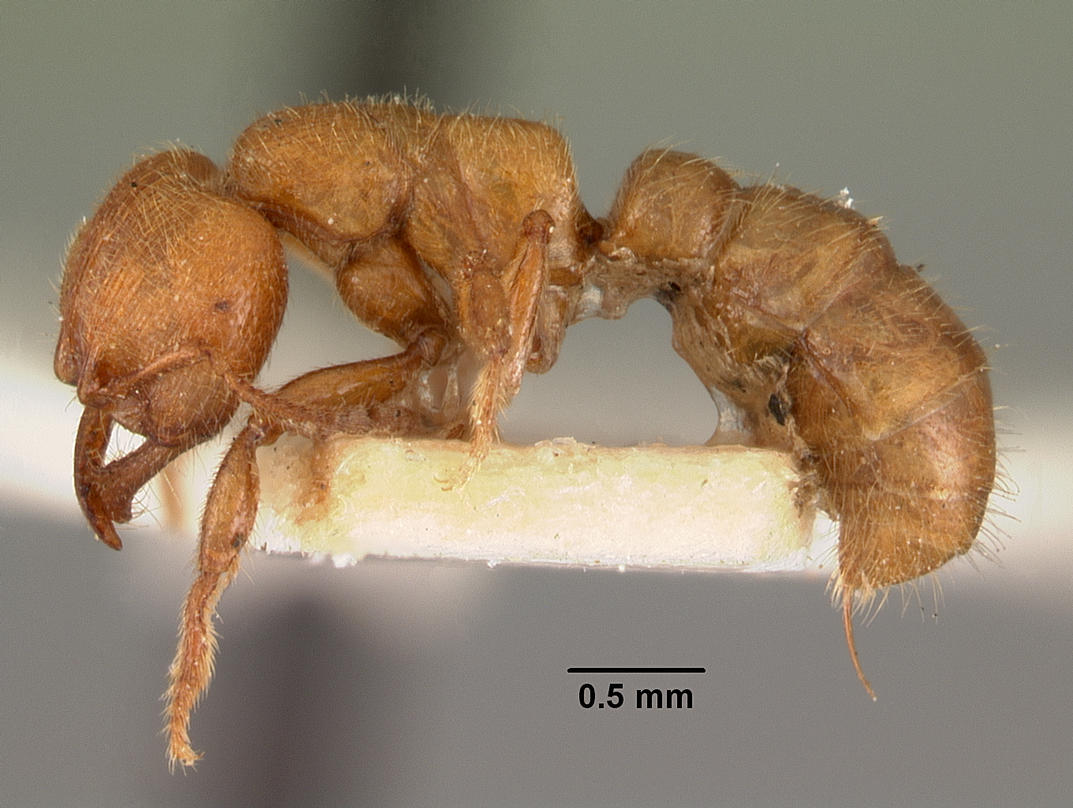
- Amblyopone aberrans worker

Scientific classification
- Kingdom: Animalia
- Phylum: Arthropoda
- Class: Insecta
- Order: Hymenoptera
- Family: Formicidae
- Genus: Amblyopone
- Species: A. aberrans

Binomial name
- Amblyopone aberrans Wheeler, 1927

= Amblyopone aberrans =

Species of ant

Amblyopone aberrans is a species of ant in the genus Amblyopone, endemic to Australia. The species was described by Wheeler in 1927.
