= Plectroscapus =

Scientific classification
- Kingdom: Animalia
- Phylum: Arthropoda
- Class: Insecta
- Order: Coleoptera
- Suborder: Polyphaga
- Infraorder: Cucujiformia
- Family: Cerambycidae
- Genus: Plectroscapus
- Species: P. bimaculatus

Binomial name
- Plectroscapus bimaculatus Gahan, 1890

Genus of beetles

Plectroscapus bimaculatus is a species of beetle in the family Cerambycidae, and the only species in the genus Plectroscapus. It was described by Gahan in 1890.
