= Discoceps =

Scientific classification
- Kingdom: Animalia
- Phylum: Arthropoda
- Class: Insecta
- Order: Coleoptera
- Suborder: Polyphaga
- Infraorder: Cucujiformia
- Family: Cerambycidae
- Genus: Discoceps
- Species: D. fasciatus

Binomial name
- Discoceps fasciatus Jordan, 1894

Genus of beetles

Discoceps fasciatus is a species of beetle in the family Cerambycidae, and the only species in the genus Discoceps. It was described by Karl Jordan in 1894.
