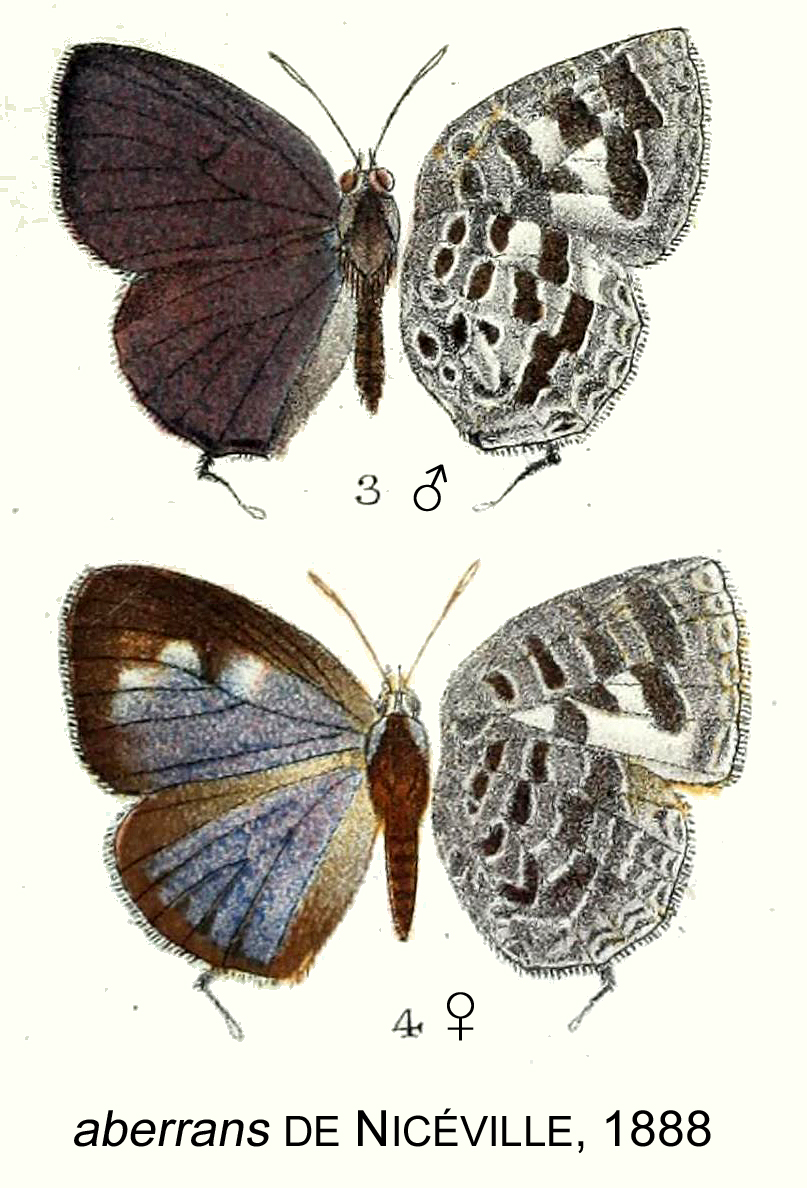
- Arhopala aberrans from original description.

Scientific classification
- Kingdom: Animalia
- Phylum: Arthropoda
- Clade: Pancrustacea
- Class: Insecta
- Order: Lepidoptera
- Family: Lycaenidae
- Genus: Arhopala
- Species: A. aberrans

Binomial name
- Arhopala aberrans (de Nicéville, [1889])

= Arhopala aberrans =

Pale bush blue

Species of butterfly

Arhopala aberrans, the pale bush blue, is a butterfly in the family Lycaenidae. It was described by Lionel de Niceville in 1889. It is found in the Indomalayan realm where it is recorded in Sikkim, Assam, Burma and China.

== Description ==
Seitz- Very like Arhopala birmana In that species the postmedian band on the forewing beneath is still coherent, whereas in the larger form aberrans Nic. (150 B d) it is interrupted in the centre. In this form from Tenasserim the female has also much more white in the disc of the forewing above. The male is above violettish-blue with a broader or narrower black margin.
