= Fasciculacmocera =

Scientific classification
- Kingdom: Animalia
- Phylum: Arthropoda
- Class: Insecta
- Order: Coleoptera
- Suborder: Polyphaga
- Infraorder: Cucujiformia
- Family: Cerambycidae
- Genus: Fasciculacmocera
- Species: F. griseovaria

Binomial name
- Fasciculacmocera griseovaria Breuning, 1966

Genus of beetles

Fasciculacmocera griseovaria is a species of beetle in the family Cerambycidae, and the only species in the genus Fasciculacmocera. It was described by Breuning in 1966.
