= Acridoschema aberrans =

Scientific classification
- Domain: Eukaryota
- Kingdom: Animalia
- Phylum: Arthropoda
- Class: Insecta
- Order: Coleoptera
- Suborder: Polyphaga
- Infraorder: Cucujiformia
- Family: Cerambycidae
- Genus: Acridoschema
- Species: A. aberrans

Binomial name
- Acridoschema aberrans (Jordan, 1894)

Species of beetle

Acridoschema aberrans is a species of beetle in the family Cerambycidae. It was described by Karl Jordan in 1894.
