= Stenobia =

Scientific classification
- Kingdom: Animalia
- Phylum: Arthropoda
- Class: Insecta
- Order: Coleoptera
- Suborder: Polyphaga
- Infraorder: Cucujiformia
- Family: Cerambycidae
- Genus: Stenobia
- Species: S. pradieri

Binomial name
- Stenobia pradieri Lacordaire, 1872

Genus of beetles

Stenobia pradieri is a species of beetle in the family Cerambycidae, and the only species in the genus Stenobia. It was described by Jean Théodore Lacordaire in 1872.
