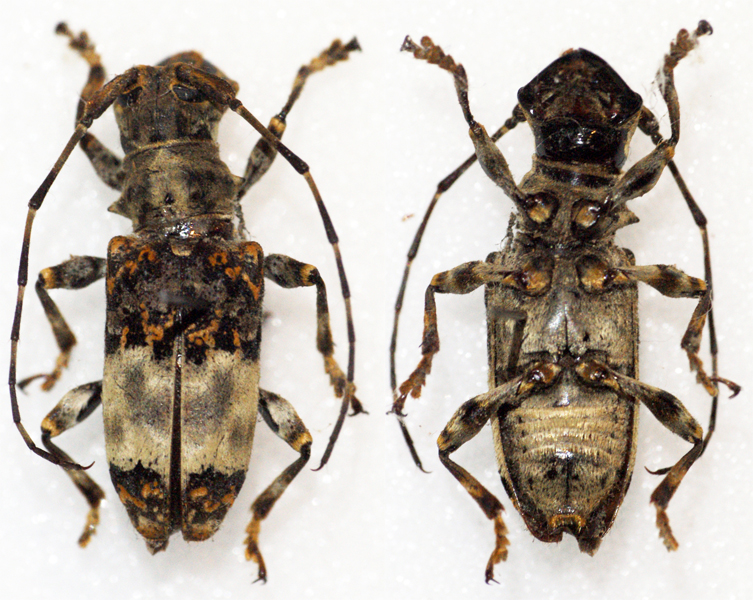
- Acmocera olympiana

Scientific classification
- Kingdom: Animalia
- Phylum: Arthropoda
- Class: Insecta
- Order: Coleoptera
- Suborder: Polyphaga
- Infraorder: Cucujiformia
- Family: Cerambycidae
- Tribe: Acmocerini
- Genus: Acmocera; Dejean, 1835

= Acmocera =

Genus of beetles

Acmocera is a genus of longhorn beetles of the subfamily Lamiinae.

- Acmocera compressa (Fabricius, 1801)
- Acmocera conjux Thomson, 1858
- Acmocera flavoguttata Breuning, 1935
- Acmocera inermis Thomson, 1858
- Acmocera insularis Breuning, 1940
- Acmocera joveri Lepesme & Breuning, 1952
- Acmocera lutosa Jordan, 1903
- Acmocera olympiana Thomson, 1858
