= 2020 in paleoentomology =

2020 in paleoentomology is a list of new fossil insect taxa that were described during the year 2020, as well as other significant discoveries and events related to paleoentomology that occurred during the year.

== Clade Amphiesmenoptera ==
=== Lepidoptera ===
Name	Novelty	Status	Authors	Age	Type locality	Country	Notes	Images
Archmosaicus	Gen. et sp. nov		Zhang et al.	Late Cretaceous (Cenomanian)	Burmese amber	Myanmar	A Micropterigidae moth. The type species is A. comitatus.	
Cretocrania	Gen. et 3 sp. nov	Valid	Melnitsky & Ivanov in Kopylov et al.	Early Cretaceous		Russia	An Eriocraniidaen moth. The type species is C. stekolnikovi The genus also includes C. glosancestralis and C. inconcessa.	
Eocompsoctena	Gen. et sp. nov	Valid	Ngô-Muller et al.	Eocene	Baltic amber	Europe (Baltic Sea region)	An Eriocottidae moth. The type species is E. macroptera.	
Miogeometrida	Gen. et sp. nov	Valid	Zhang, Shih & Shih in Zhang et al.	Miocene	Dominican amber	Dominican Republic	A geometer moth. The type species is M. chunjenshihi.	
Protosiberopterix	Gen. et 3 sp. nov	Valid	Melnitsky & Ivanov in Kopylov et al.	Early Cretaceous		Russia	A Eolepidopterigidae Lepidopteran. The type species is P. antitheton The genus also includes P. equesaeneus & P. praevernalis.	
Sabatinca pouilloni	Sp. nov	Valid	Ngô-Muller & Nel in Ngô-Muller et al.	Late Cretaceous (Cenomanian)	Burmese amber	Myanmar	A moth, a species of Sabatinca.	

=== Tarachoptera ===
Name	Novelty	Status	Authors	Age	Type locality	Country	Notes	Images
Kinitocelis macroptera	Sp. nov	Valid	Mey & Wichard in Mey et al.	Late Cretaceous (Cenomanian)	Burmese amber	Myanmar	A member of Tarachoptera.	
Retortocelis spicipalpia	Sp. nov	Valid	Mey & Wichard in Mey et al.	Late Cretaceous (Cenomanian)	Burmese amber	Myanmar	A member of Tarachoptera.	

=== Trichopterans ===
Name	Novelty	Status	Authors	Age	Type locality	Country	Notes	Images
Archiphilopotamus absurdus	Sp. nov	Valid	Sukatsheva & Vasilenko	Middle Jurassic		Russia	A member of the family Philopotamidae.	
Archiphilopotamus kubekovensis	Sp. nov	Valid	Sukatsheva & Vasilenko	Middle Jurassic		Russia	A member of the family Philopotamidae.	
Axiomaldia	Gen. et sp. nov	Valid	Melnitsky & Ivanov in Kopylov et al.	Early Cretaceous		Russia	A caddisfly of uncertain phylogenetic placement. The type species is A. flinti.	
Bipectinata	Gen. et sp. nov	Valid	Wichard et al.	Late Cretaceous (Cenomanian)	Burmese amber	Myanmar	Originally described as a member of the family Calamoceratidae; subsequently transferred to the family Odontoceridae by Wichard (2023). The type species is B. orientalis.	
Buranima	Gen. et sp. nov	Valid	Melnitsky & Ivanov in Kopylov et al.	Early Cretaceous		Russia	A member of the family Psychomyiidae. The type species is B. gorhon.	
Burimodus	Gen. et sp. nov	Valid	Sukatsheva & Aristov	Early Cretaceous	Khasurty locality	Russia	A member of the family Vitimotauliidae. Genus includes new species B. novus.	
Buryatocentrus	Gen. et sp. nov	Valid	Melnitsky & Ivanov in Kopylov et al.	Early Cretaceous		Russia	A member of Integripalpia belonging to the family Yantarocentridae. The type species is B. suspiciosus.	
Cretacoptila	Gen. et sp. nov	In press	Wichard	Late Cretaceous (Cenomanian)	Burmese amber	Myanmar	Genus includes new species C. botosaneanui.	
Dauroglos	Gen. et sp. nov	Valid	Melnitsky & Ivanov in Kopylov et al.	Early Cretaceous		Russia	A member of the family Glossosomatidae. The type species is D. hohlomak.	
Duamodus	Gen. et 2 sp. nov	Valid	Melnitsky & Ivanov in Kopylov et al.	Early Cretaceous		Russia	A member of Integripalpia belonging to the family Vitimotauliidae. The type species is D. anichkovi; genus also includes D. necessarius.	
Dysoneura subbota	Sp. nov	Valid	Melnitsky & Ivanov in Kopylov et al.	Early Cretaceous		Russia	A member of the family Dysoneuridae.	
Electrocentropus	Gen. et sp. nov	In press	Wichard	Late Cretaceous (Cenomanian)	Burmese amber	Myanmar	Genus includes new species E. dilucidus.	
Juraphilopotamus callidus	Sp. nov	Valid	Sukatsheva & Aristov	Early Cretaceous	Khasurty locality	Russia	A member of the family Philopotamidae.	
Juraphilopotamus funeralis	Sp. nov	Valid	Sukatsheva & Vasilenko	Middle Jurassic		Russia	A member of the family Philopotamidae.	
Khasurtia novissima	Sp. nov	Valid	Melnitsky & Ivanov in Kopylov et al.	Early Cretaceous		Russia	A member of the family Dysoneuridae.	
Meloclada	Gen. et 2 sp. nov	Valid	Melnitsky & Ivanov in Kopylov et al.	Early Cretaceous		Russia	A member of the family Cladochoristidae. The type species is M. diuturna; genus also includes M. frequentatoria.	
Mesocolepus	Gen. et sp. nov	Valid	Melnitsky & Ivanov in Kopylov et al.	Early Cretaceous		Russia	A member of Hydroptiloidea belonging to the family Ptilocolepidae. The type species is M. deflectum.	
Multimodus amplus	Sp. nov	Valid	Sukatsheva & Aristov	Early Cretaceous	Khasurty locality	Russia	A member of the family Vitimotauliidae.	
Myanpsyche	Gen. et sp. nov	In press	Wichard	Late Cretaceous (Cenomanian)	Burmese amber	Myanmar	The type species is "Kambaitipsyche" malaisei Wichard & Wang (2020).	
Palaeopsilotreta burmanica	Sp. nov	Valid	Wichard et al.	Late Cretaceous (Cenomanian)	Burmese amber	Myanmar	A member of the family Odontoceridae.	
Palaeopsilotreta cretacea	Sp. nov	Valid	Wichard et al.	Late Cretaceous (Cenomanian)	Burmese amber	Myanmar	A member of the family Odontoceridae.	
Palaeosiberomiya	Gen. et sp. nov	Valid	Melnitsky & Ivanov in Kopylov et al.	Early Cretaceous		Russia	A member of the family Dysoneuridae. The type species is P. zugzwanga.	
Protobaikalopsyche	Fam. nov., Gen. et sp. nov	Valid	Melnitsky & Ivanov in Kopylov et al.	Early Cretaceous		Russia	A member of Annulipalpia belonging to the new family Protobaikalopsychidae. The type species is P. rossica.	
Protorodinia	Gen. et sp. nov	Valid	Melnitsky & Ivanov in Kopylov et al.	Early Cretaceous		Russia	A member of the family Leptoceridae. The type species is P. khasurtensis.	
Purbimodus parvulus	Sp. nov	Valid	Sukatsheva & Aristov	Early Cretaceous	Khasurty locality	Russia	A member of the family Vitimotauliidae.	
Sententimiya	Gen. et sp. nov	Valid	Melnitsky & Ivanov in Kopylov et al.	Early Cretaceous		Russia	A member of the family Psychomyiidae. The type species is S. wichardi.	
Shadareniskia	Gen. et sp. nov	Valid	Melnitsky & Ivanov in Kopylov et al.	Early Cretaceous		Russia	A member of the family Hydrobiosidae. The type species is S. inambularia.	
Siberocretopetus	Gen. et sp. nov	Valid	Melnitsky & Ivanov in Kopylov et al.	Early Cretaceous		Russia	A member of the family Glossosomatidae. The type species is S. ekaterinae.	
Siberoprostoria	Gen. et sp. nov	Valid	Melnitsky & Ivanov in Kopylov et al.	Early Cretaceous		Russia	A member of the family Hydrobiosidae. The type species is S. archaeoscriptor.	
Styxowia	Gen. et sp. nov	Valid	Melnitsky & Ivanov in Kopylov et al.	Early Cretaceous		Russia	A member of the family Polycentropodidae. The type species is S. predponimania.	
Susurimiya	Gen. et sp. nov	Valid	Melnitsky & Ivanov in Kopylov et al.	Early Cretaceous		Russia	A member of the family Psychomyiidae. The type species is S. transbaikalica.	
Terminoptysma	Fam. nov., Gen. et sp. nov	Valid	Melnitsky & Ivanov in Kopylov et al.	Early Cretaceous		Russia	A member of Protomeropina belonging to the new family Terminoptysmatidae. The type species is T. contradictoria.	
Wormaldia cercifurcata	Sp. nov	Valid	Wichard, Müller & Wang	Late Cretaceous (Cenomanian)	Burmese amber	Myanmar	A species of Wormaldia.	
Wormaldia cercilonga	Sp. nov	Valid	Wichard, Müller & Wang	Late Cretaceous (Cenomanian)	Burmese amber	Myanmar	A species of Wormaldia.	
Wormaldia squamosa	Sp. nov	Valid	Wichard, Müller & Wang	Late Cretaceous (Cenomanian)	Burmese amber	Myanmar	A species of Wormaldia.	
Wormaldia transversa	Sp. nov	Valid	Wichard, Müller & Wang	Late Cretaceous (Cenomanian)	Burmese amber	Myanmar	A species of Wormaldia.	

== Clade Antliophora ==
=== Dipterans ===
Name	Novelty	Status	Authors	Age	Type locality	Country	Notes	Images
Adamacrocera	Gen. et sp. nov	Valid	Ševčík, Krzemiński & Skibińska	Late Cretaceous (Cenomanian)	Burmese amber	Myanmar	A member of the family Keroplatidae. The type species is A. adami.	
Alavesia angusta	Sp. nov	Valid	Sinclair & Grimaldi	Cretaceous (late Albian-early Cenomanian)	Burmese amber	Myanmar	A member of the family Atelestidae.	
Alavesia brevipennae	Sp. nov	Valid	Sinclair & Grimaldi	Cretaceous (late Albian-early Cenomanian)	Burmese amber	Myanmar	A member of the family Atelestidae.	
Alavesia lanceolata	Sp. nov	Valid	Sinclair & Grimaldi	Cretaceous (late Albian-early Cenomanian)	Burmese amber	Myanmar	A member of the family Atelestidae.	
Alavesia latala	Sp. nov	Valid	Sinclair & Grimaldi	Cretaceous (late Albian-early Cenomanian)	Burmese amber	Myanmar	A member of the family Atelestidae.	
Alavesia longicornuta	Sp. nov	Valid	Sinclair & Grimaldi	Cretaceous (late Albian-early Cenomanian)	Burmese amber	Myanmar	A member of the family Atelestidae.	
Alavesia longistylata	Sp. nov	Valid	Zhang & Wang in Zhang et al.	Late Cretaceous (Cenomanian)	Burmese amber	Myanmar	A member of the family Atelestidae.	
Alavesia magna	Sp. nov	Valid	Sinclair & Grimaldi	Cretaceous (late Albian-early Cenomanian)	Burmese amber	Myanmar	A member of the family Atelestidae.	
Alavesia myanmarensis	Sp. nov	Valid	Jouault et al.	Late Cretaceous (Cenomanian)	Burmese amber	Myanmar	A member of the family Atelestidae.	
Alavesia pankowskiorum	Sp. nov	Valid	Sinclair & Grimaldi	Cretaceous (late Albian-early Cenomanian)	Burmese amber	Myanmar	A member of the family Atelestidae.	
Alavesia spinosa	Sp. nov	Valid	Sinclair & Grimaldi	Cretaceous (late Albian-early Cenomanian)	Burmese amber	Myanmar	A member of the family Atelestidae.	
Alavesia tripudii	Sp. nov	In press	Zhang et al.	Late Cretaceous (Cenomanian)	Burmese amber	Myanmar	A member of the family Atelestidae.	
Alavesia wimpala	Sp. nov	Valid	Stark et al.	Late Cretaceous (Cenomanian)	Burmese amber	Myanmar	A member of the family Atelestidae.	
Alavesia zigrasi	Sp. nov	Valid	Sinclair & Grimaldi	Cretaceous (late Albian-early Cenomanian)	Burmese amber	Myanmar	A member of the family Atelestidae.	
Amorimyia	Gen. et sp. nov	Valid	Lukashevich	Early Cretaceous		Russia	A member of the family Anisopodidae. Genus includes new species A. robusta.	
Brachypremna chenhuameii	Sp. nov	Valid	Men & Hu	Miocene	Dominican amber	Dominican Republic	A species of Brachypremna.	
Burmaprorates	Gen. et sp. nov	Valid	Jouault & Nel	Late Cretaceous (Cenomanian)	Burmese amber	Myanmar	A member of the family Scenopinidae belonging to the subfamily Proratinae. Genus includes new species B. alagracilis.	
Burminemestrinus	Gen. et sp. nov	Valid	Zhang, Zhang & Wang	Late Cretaceous (Cenomanian)	Burmese amber	Myanmar	A member of Nemestrinoidea belonging to the family Rhagionemestriidae. Genus includes new species B. qiyani.	
Burmochlus	Gen. et sp. nov	Valid	Giłka, Zakrzewska & Makarchenko	Late Cretaceous (Cenomanian)	Burmese amber	Myanmar	A member of the family Chironomidae belonging to the subfamily Podonominae. Genus includes new species B. madmaxi.	
Chimeromyia vulloi	Sp. nov	Valid	Jouault, Solórzano-Kraemer & Perrichot	Cretaceous (Cenomanian)	Charentese amber	France	A member of the family Chimeromyiidae.	
Collessomma	Gen. et 3 sp. nov	Valid	Lukashevich & Blagoderov	Early Cretaceous		Mongolia; Russia	A member of the family Perissommatidae. Genus includes new species C. sibirica, C. gnoma and C. mongolica.	
Cretadicerura	Gen. et sp. nov	Valid	Azar & Nel	Early Cretaceous	Lebanese amber	Lebanon	A member of the family Cecidomyiidae. Genus includes new species C. salimi.	
Cretinemestrimus	Gen. et comb. nov	In press	Zhang, Zhang & Wang	Late Cretaceous (Cenomanian)	Burmese amber	Myanmar	A member of Nemestrinoidea belonging to the family Rhagionemestriidae; a new genus for "Jurassinemestrinus" eurema Grimaldi (2016).	
Cretobibio	Gen. et sp. nov	Valid	Skartveit & Ansorge	Early Cretaceous		Spain	A member of the family Bibionidae. Genus includes new species C. montsecensis.	
Eoconophorina	Gen. et sp. nov	In press	Maheu & Nel	Early Eocene		France	A member of the family Bombyliidae belonging to the subfamily Bombyliinae, possibly a member of the tribe Conophorini. The type species is E. delfineae.	
Eoexechia	Gen. et sp. nov	Valid	Camier & Nel	Early Eocene	Oise amber	France	A member of the family Mycetophilidae. Genus includes new species E. gallica.	
Eoptychoptera fasbenderi	Sp. nov	Valid	Lukashevich	Early Cretaceous		Russia	A member of the family Ptychopteridae.	
Eotipula wieslawi	Sp. nov	Valid	Kopeć, Skibińska & Soszyńska-Maj	Early Cretaceous		Russia	A member of the family Limoniidae.	
Eoxanthandrus	Gen. et sp. nov	Valid	Ngô-Muller & Nel	Eocene	Baltic amber	Europe (Baltic Sea region)	A hoverfly. Genus includes new species E. garroustei.	
Espanoderus orientalis	Sp. nov	Valid	Men, Hu & Xu	Late Cretaceous (Cenomanian)	Burmese amber	Myanmar	A member of the family Tanyderidae.	
Francomyina	Gen. et sp. nov	Valid	Jouault, Solórzano-Kraemer & Perrichot	Cretaceous (Albian–Cenomanian)	Charentese amber	France	A member of Eremoneura of uncertain phylogenetic placement. Genus includes new species F. incomparabilis.	
Gilkania	Gen. et sp. nov	Valid	Lukashevich	Early Cretaceous		Russia	A member of the family Chironomidae. Genus includes new species G. transbaikalica.	
Hoffeinsodes adamowiczi	Sp. nov	Valid	Skibińska et al.	Eocene	Baltic amber	Russia (Kaliningrad Oblast)	A member of the family Psychodidae belonging to the subfamily Bruchomyiinae.	
Lebanowinnertzia	Gen. et sp. nov	Valid	Azar & Nel	Early Cretaceous	Lebanese amber	Lebanon	A member of the family Cecidomyiidae. Genus includes new species L. perrichoti.	
Leptotarsus burmica	Sp. nov	In press	Men & Hu	Late Cretaceous (Cenomanian)	Burmese amber	Myanmar	A species of Leptotarsus.	
Libanoclinorrhytis	Gen. et sp. nov	Valid	Azar & Nel	Early Cretaceous	Lebanese amber	Lebanon	A member of the family Cecidomyiidae. Genus includes new species L. jaschhofi.	
Libanohilversidia	Gen. et sp. nov	Valid	Azar & Nel	Early Cretaceous	Lebanese amber	Lebanon	A member of the family Cecidomyiidae. Genus includes new species L. doryi.	
Mesotipula jacutica	Sp. nov	Valid	Kopeć in Kopeć et al.	Late Jurassic/Early Cretaceous		Russia	A member of the family Limoniidae.	
Mesotipula popovi	Sp. nov	Valid	Kopeć in Kopeć et al.	Early Cretaceous (Barremian-Aptian)		Mongolia	A member of the family Limoniidae.	
Mesotipula undinella	Sp. nov	Valid	Kopeć & Krzemiński in Kopeć et al.	Jurassic/Cretaceous boundary		Russia	A member of the family Limoniidae.	
Meunierohelea fudalai	Sp. nov	Valid	Szadziewski, Sontag & Bojarski	Miocene	Dominican amber	Dominican Republic	A member of the family Ceratopogonidae.	
Microphorites pouilloni	Sp. nov	Valid	Ngô-Muller et al.	Late Cretaceous (Cenomanian)	Burmese amber	Myanmar	A member of the family Dolichopodidae belonging to the subfamily Microphorinae.	
Neoalavesia	Gen. et sp. nov	Disputed	Poinar & Vega	Late Cretaceous (Cenomanian)	Burmese amber	Myanmar	A member of the family Atelestidae. Genus includes new species N. hadroceria. Sinclair & Grimaldi (2020) considered this genus to be a junior synonym of the genus Alavesia, though the authors maintained the species N. hadroceria as a distinct species within the genus Alavesia.	
Nidergasia	Gen. et sp. nov	Valid	Ngô-Muller et al.	Late Cretaceous (Cenomanian)	Burmese amber	Myanmar	A member of the family Bombyliidae. Genus includes new species N. neraudeaui.	
Nymphomyia allissae	Sp. nov	Valid	Wagner & Müller	Late Cretaceous (Cenomanian)	Burmese amber	Myanmar	A member of the family Nymphomyiidae.	
Palaeonerius	Gen. et sp. nov	Valid	Sepúlveda & Gomes	Miocene	Mexican amber	Mexico	A member of the family Neriidae. Genus includes new species P. souzai.	
Paleocytherea	Gen. et sp. nov	Valid	Ngô-Muller et al.	Late Cretaceous (Cenomanian)	Burmese amber	Myanmar	A member of the family Bombyliidae. Genus includes new species P. pouilloni.	
Paleothrypticus	Gen. et sp. nov	Valid	Ngô-Muller, Garrouste & Nel	Early Eocene	Oise amber	France	A member of the family Dolichopodidae belonging to the subfamily Medeterinae. Genus includes new species P. eocenicus.	
Pilaria magdalena	Sp. nov	In press	Kopeć, Krzemiński & Albrycht	Late Cretaceous (Cenomanian)	Burmese amber	Myanmar	A species of Pilaria.	
Pilaria wojciechi	Sp. nov	In press	Kopeć, Krzemiński & Albrycht	Late Cretaceous (Cenomanian)	Burmese amber	Myanmar	A species of Pilaria.	
Pouillonhybos	Gen. et sp. nov	In press	Ngô-Muller et al.	Late Cretaceous (Cenomanian)	Burmese amber	Myanmar	A member of the family Hybotidae belonging to the subfamily Ocydromiinae. Genus includes new species P. venator.	
Praearchitipula kaluginae	Sp. nov	Valid	Lukashevich	Early Cretaceous		Russia	A member of the family Pediciidae.	
Praearchitipula podenasi	Sp. nov	Valid	Lukashevich	Early Cretaceous		Russia	A member of the family Pediciidae.	
Praearchitipula ribeiroi	Sp. nov	Valid	Lukashevich	Early Cretaceous		Russia	A member of the family Pediciidae.	
Praearchitipula ryszardi	Sp. nov	Valid	Kopeć, Skibińska & Soszyńska-Maj	Early Cretaceous		Russia	A member of the family Pediciidae.	
Protanthomyza grimaldii	Sp. nov	Valid	Roháček	Eocene	Baltic amber	Russia (Kaliningrad Oblast)	A member of the family Anthomyzidae.	Protanthomyza grimaldii
Protanthomyza ryszardi	Sp. nov	Valid	Roháček & Hoffeins	Eocene	Baltic amber	Europe (Baltic Sea region)	A member of the family Anthomyzidae.	
?Protanyderus madrizi	Sp. nov	Valid	Lukashevich	Early Cretaceous		Russia	A member of the family Tanyderidae.	
Protopsychoda leoi	Sp. nov	Valid	Azar & Maksoud	Early Cretaceous	Lebanese amber	Lebanon	A member of the family Psychodidae.	
Sakhalinopericoma	Gen. et sp. nov	Valid	Azar & Maksoud	Eocene	Sakhalin amber	Russia	A member of the family Psychodidae. Genus includes new species S. russiaensis.	
Sakhalinopsychoda	Gen. et sp. nov	Valid	Azar & Maksoud	Eocene	Sakhalin amber	Russia	A member of the family Psychodidae. Genus includes new species S. krzeminskii.	
Similinannotanyderus longitergata	Sp. nov	In press	Men, Hu & Xu	Late Cretaceous (Cenomanian)	Burmese amber	Myanmar	A member of the family Tanyderidae.	
Stempellina pollex	Sp. nov	In press	Zakrzewska et al.	Early Eocene	Cambay amber	India	A species of Stempellina.	
Stempellina stebneri	Sp. nov	Valid	Zakrzewska et al.	Early Eocene	Cambay amber	India	A species of Stempellina.	
Symphoromyia clerci	Sp. nov	Valid	Ngo-Muller & Nel	Eocene	Baltic amber	Europe (Baltic Sea region)	A species of Symphoromyia.	
Syneproctus	Gen. et sp. nov	Valid	Solórzano-Kraemer et al.	Miocene	Dominican amber	Dominican Republic	A member of the family Hybotidae belonging to the subfamily Hybotinae. The type species is S. caridadi.	
Synneuron eomontana	Sp. nov	Valid	Amorim & Greenwalt	Middle Eocene	Kishenehn Formation	United States	A species of Synneuron.	
Synneuron jelli	Sp. nov	Valid	Amorim & Greenwalt	Early Cretaceous	Koonwarra Fossil Bed	Australia	A species of Synneuron.	
Tanytarsus forfex	Sp. nov	Valid	Zakrzewska et al.	Early Eocene	Cambay amber	India	A species of Tanytarsus.	
Tanytarsus ramus	Sp. nov	Valid	Zakrzewska et al.	Early Eocene	Cambay amber	India	A species of Tanytarsus.	
Tipula (Gedanica) adamowiczi	Subgen. et sp. nov	Valid	Krzemiński et al.	Eocene	Baltic amber	Europe (Baltic Sea region)	A species of Tipula. Announced in 2020; the final version of the article naming it was published in 2021.	
Tipula (Succinica) berendti	Subgen. et sp. nov	Valid	Krzemiński et al.	Eocene	Baltic amber	Europe (Baltic Sea region)	A species of Tipula. Announced in 2020; the final version of the article naming it was published in 2021.	
Tonnoira sakhalinensis	Sp. nov	Valid	Azar & Maksoud	Eocene	Sakhalin amber	Russia	A member of the family Psychodidae.	
Trentepohlia miocenica	Sp. nov	Valid	Mederos & Wang in Mederos et al.	Miocene	Dominican amber	Dominican Republic	A species of Trentepohlia.	
Ugolyakomyia	Gen. et sp. nov	Valid	Fedotova & Perkovsky	Late Cretaceous (Santonian)	Taimyr amber	Russia	A member of Micromyinae belonging to the tribe Aprionini. Genus includes new species U. rautianae.	
Viriosinemestrius	Gen. et sp. nov	In press	Zhang, Zhang & Wang	Late Cretaceous (Cenomanian)	Burmese amber	Myanmar	A member of Nemestrinoidea belonging to the family Rhagionemestriidae. Genus includes new species V. mai.	
Vladelektra	Gen. et sp. nov	Valid	Evenhuis	Cretaceous (Albian to Cenomanian)	Burmese amber	Myanmar	A member of the family Keroplatidae. The type species is V. blagoderovi.	
Yantarpsychodus	Gen. et sp. nov	Valid	Azar & Maksoud	Late Cretaceous (Santonian)	Yantardakh amber	Russia	A member of the family Psychodidae. Genus includes new species Y. szadziewskii.	

=== Mecopterans ===
Name	Novelty	Status	Authors	Age	Type locality	Country	Notes	Images
Burmomerope bashkuevi	Sp. nov	In press	Sun et al.	Late Cretaceous (Cenomanian)	Burmese amber	Myanmar	A member of the family Meropeidae.	
Burmopsyche	Gen. et 2 sp. nov	Valid	Zhao et al.	Late Cretaceous (Cenomanian)	Burmese amber	Myanmar	A member of the family Aneuretopsychidae. The type species is B. bella; genus also includes B. xiai.	
Duraznochorista	Gen. et sp. nov	Valid	Lara & Bashkuev	Late Triassic	Potrerillos Formation	Argentina	A member of the family Permochoristidae. Genus includes new species D. zavattierii.	
Potrerillopanorpa	Gen. et sp. nov	Valid	Lara & Bashkuev	Late Triassic	Potrerillos Formation	Argentina	A member of the family Parachoristidae. Genus includes new species P. macloughlini.	
Prochoristella shuangyangensis	Sp. nov	Valid	Lian, Cai & Huang	Mesozoic	Xiaofengmidingzi Formation	China	A member of the family Mesopanorpodidae.	

=== Siphonaptera ===
Name	Novelty	Status	Authors	Age	Type locality	Country	Notes	Images
Saurophthirus laevigatus	Sp. nov	Valid	Zhang et al. in Zhang et al.	Early Cretaceous (Aptian)	Yixian Formation	China	A stem-group flea	Saurophthirus laevigatus

== Clade Archaeorthoptera ==
=== †Caloneurodea ===
Name	Novelty	Status	Authors	Age	Type locality	Location	Notes	Images
Sinaspidoneura	Gen. et sp. nov	Valid	Huang et al.	Middle Permian	Yinping Formation	China	An aspidoneurid Caloneurodean Archaeorthopteran. The type species is S. magnifica.	

=== Orthopterans ===
Name	Novelty	Status	Authors	Age	Type locality	Country	Notes	Images
Aboilus (?) khasurty	Sp. nov	Valid	Gorochov in Kopylov et al.	Early Cretaceous		Russia	A member of the family Prophalangopsidae.	
Archaicaripipteryx	Gen. et sp. nov	Valid	Xu et al.	Late Cretaceous (Cenomanian)	Burmese amber	Myanmar	A member of the family Ripipterygidae. Genus includes new species A. rotunda.	
Birmaninemobius	Gen. et sp. nov	In press	Xu et al.	Late Cretaceous (Cenomanian)	Burmese amber	Myanmar	A member of the family Trigonidiidae belonging to the subfamily Nemobiinae. Genus includes new species B. hirsutus.	
Burmagryllotalpa	Gen. et sp. nov	Valid	Wang et al.	Late Cretaceous (Cenomanian)	Burmese amber	Myanmar	Originally described as a mole cricket, but subsequently argued to be a member of the family Gryllidae. Genus includes new species B. longa.	
Cenoelcanus	Gen. et sp. nov	Valid	Schubnel et al.	Middle Paleocene	Menat Formation	France	A member of Elcanoidea belonging to the family Elcanidae. The type species is C. menatensis.	
Ellca	Gen. et sp. nov	In press	Kočárek	Late Cretaceous (Cenomanian)	Burmese amber	Myanmar	A member of the family Elcanidae. Genus includes new species E. nevelka.	
Hejiafanga	Gen. et sp. nov	Valid	Xu et al.	Middle Triassic	Tongchuan Formation	China	A member of the family Locustavidae. Genus includes new species H. tongchuanensis.	
Legendreia	Fam. nov., Gen. et sp. nov	Valid	Huang, Schubnel & Nel	Middle Permian	Yinping Formation	China	A member of the new family Legendreiidae. The type species is L. magnifica.	
Magnidactylus	Gen. et sp. nov	Valid	Xu, Fang & Jarzembowski	Late Cretaceous (Cenomanian)	Burmese amber	Myanmar	A member of the family Tridactylidae or Ripipterygidae. Genus includes new species M. robustus.	
Menatgryllus	Gen. et sp. nov	Valid	Schubnel et al.	Middle Paleocene	Menat Formation	France	A member of Grylloidea, possibly belonging to the family Gryllidae. The type species is M. longixiphus.	
Mongoloxya fossor	Sp. nov	Valid	Gorochov in Kopylov et al.	Early Cretaceous		Russia	A member of the family Tridactylidae.	
Paleochina	Gen. et 2 sp. nov	Valid	Schubnel et al.	Middle Paleocene	Menat Formation	France	Possibly a member of the family Chorotypidae. The type species is P. duvergeri; genus also includes P. minuta.	
Pherodactylus	Gen. et sp. nov	Valid	Poinar, Su & Brown	Cretaceous (Albian-Cenomanian)	Burmese amber	Myanmar	A cricket. The type species is P. micromorphus.	A several-milometer cricket which is mostly reddish-beige on a white background
Sinoelcana	Gen. et sp. nov	Valid	Gu, Tian, Wang & Yue in Gu et al.	Middle Jurassic (Bathonian–Callovian boundary)	Jiulongshan	China	A member of the family Elcanidae belonging to the subfamily Archelcaninae. The type species is S. minuta.	
Sinuijuboilus	Gen. et sp. nov	Valid	So et al.	Early Cretaceous	Sinuiju Formation	North Korea	A member of the family Prophalangopsidae. Genus includes new species S. baektoensis.	
Tresdigitus	Gen. et sp. nov	Disputed	Xu, Fang & Wang	Late Cretaceous (Cenomanian)	Burmese amber	Myanmar	Genus includes new species T. rectanguli. Originally described as a mole cricket; Cadena-Castañeda et al. (2023) considered the genus Tresdigitus to be a junior synonym of the gryllid genus Pherodactylus, though the authors maintained T. rectanguli as a distinct species within the latter genus.	

=== Other Archaeorthoptera ===
Name	Novelty	Status	Authors	Age	Type locality	Country	Notes	Images
Beloatta	Gen. et sp. nov	Valid	Nel, Garrouste & Roques	Carboniferous		France	A member of the family Eoblattidae. Genus includes new species B. duquesnei.	
Palatinoedischia	Gen. et sp. nov	Valid	Nel & Poschmann	Early Permian	Saar–Nahe Basin	Germany	An Oedischioidean Archaeorthopteran. The type species is P. elongata.	
Phtanomiamia	Gen. et sp. nov	Valid	Chen, Ren & Béthoux	Carboniferous (latest Bashkirian to middle Moscovian)	Yanghugou Formation	China	A stem-orthopteran. The type species is P. gui.	

=== Archaeorthopteran research ===
- A study on the evolutionary history of the group Phasmatodea, as indicated by phylogenomic and fossil evidence, is published by Tihelka et al. (2020).

== Clade Coleopterida ==
=== Coleopterans ===
Name	Novelty	Status	Authors	Age	Type locality	Country	Notes	Images
Acanthoglyptus	Gen. et sp. nov	Valid	Alekseev & Vitali	Eocene	Baltic amber	Russia (Kaliningrad Oblast)	An Anaglyptini longhorn beetle. The type species is A. picollus.	
Adamas	Gen. et sp. nov	Junior homonym	Chen & Zhang	Late Cretaceous (Cenomanian)	Burmese amber	Myanmar	A member of the family Lymexylidae. Genus includes new species A. hukawngensis. The generic name is preoccupied by Adamas Malaise (1945) and Adamas Huber (1979); Perkovsky (2022) coined a replacement name Anancites.	
Afrotaldycupes	Gen. et comb. nov	Valid	Kirejtshuk	Permian		South Africa	A taldycupedine Permocupedidae. The type species is "Taldycupes" africanus Ponomarenko in Ponomarenko & Mostovski (2005); genus also includes "Taldycupes" africanus Ponomarenko in Ponomarenko & Mostovski (2005).	
Allophalerus	Gen. et comb. nov	Valid	Kirejtshuk	Late Triassic/Early Jurassic to Late Cretaceous		Kazakhstan	An Ommatinae. The type species is "Tetraphalerus" aphaleratus Ponomarenko (1969); and an additional eight species originally assigned Tetraphalerus.	Allophalerus latus
Anebomorpha	Gen. et sp. nov	Valid	Poinar & Brown	Cretaceous (Albian-Cenomanian)	Burmese amber	Myanmar	A member of the family Cleridae. The type species is A. cercorhampha.	
Anthobium alekseevi	Sp. nov	Valid	Shavrin & Yamamoto	Eocene	Baltic amber	Russia (Kaliningrad Oblast)	A rove beetle.	
Anthonomus aphelomerus	Sp. nov	Valid	Legalov & Poinar	Early Miocene	Dominican amber	Dominican Republic	A species of Anthonomus.	
Antigracilus	Gen. et sp. nov	Valid	Zhou et al.	Early Cretaceous	Yixian	China	A member of the family Histeridae. Genus includes new species A. costatus.	
Archaeomalthus	Gen. et sp. nov	Valid	Yan et al.	Late Permian		Russia	A micromalthid. Genus includes new species A. synoriacos. Announced in 2019; the final version of the article naming was published in 2020.	
Archeopsammoporus	Gen. et sp. nov	Valid	Minkina	Eocene	Baltic amber	Russia (Kaliningrad Oblast)	A member of the family Scarabaeidae belonging to the subfamily Aegialiinae. The type species is A. balticus.	
Arzamazorhinus	Gen. et sp. nov	Valid	Legalov	Late Cretaceous (Turonian–Coniacian)	Arzamazovskaya	Russia	A member of the family Anthribidae. Genus includes new species A. neli.	
Attagenus gedanicissimus	Sp. nov	Valid	Bukejs, Háva & Alekseev	Eocene	Baltic amber Rovno amber	Baltic Sea region Ukraine	A species of Attagenus.	
Bacanius kirejtshuki	Sp. nov	Valid	Sokolov & Perkovsky	Eocene	Rovno amber	Ukraine	A species of Bacanius.	
Baltacalles	Gen. et sp. nov	Valid	Bukejs, Alekseev & Legalov	Eocene	Baltic amber	Russia (Kaliningrad Oblast)	A member of the family Curculionidae belonging to the tribe Cryptorhynchini. The type species is B. triumurbium.	
Baltelater	Gen. et sp. nov	Valid	Kundrata et al.	Eocene	Baltic amber	Russia (Kaliningrad Oblast)	A click beetle belonging to the subfamily Lissominae and the tribe Protelaterini. The type species is B. bipectinatus.	
Basinosa	Gen. et sp. nov	In press	Tihelka, Huang & Cai	Late Cretaceous (Cenomanian)	Burmese amber	Myanmar	A member of the family Nosodendridae. Genus includes new species B. pengweii.	
Bifurderum	Gen. et 2 sp. nov	Valid	Cheng et al.	Late Cretaceous (Cenomanian)	Burmese amber	Myanmar	A member of the family Zopheridae belonging to the subfamily Colydiinae. Genus includes new species B. minutum and B. donoghuei.	
Bukhkalius	Gen. et comb. nov	Valid	Kirejtshuk & Jarzembowski in Kirejtshuk	Cenomanian	Burmese amber	Myanmar	A member of Ommatinae. The type species is "Tetraphalerus" lindae Jarzembowski, Wang & Zheng (2017).	Bukhkalius lindae
Burmacateres	Gen. et sp. nov	In press	Kolibáč & Peris	Late Cretaceous (Cenomanian)	Burmese amber	Myanmar	A member of the family Lophocateridae. The type species is B. longicoxa.	
Burmapseudomorphus	Gen. et sp. nov	Valid	Beutel et al.	Cenomanian	Burmese amber	Myanmar	A ground beetle belonging to the tribe Pseudomorphini. Genus includes new species B. planus.	
Burmocoleus	Gen. et sp. et comb. nov	Valid	Kirejtshuk	Cenomanian	Burmese amber	Myanmar	A member of Ommatinae. The type species is B. prisnyi; genus also includes "Brochocoleus" zhiyuani Liu et al. (2017).	Burmocoleus prisnyi
Cacomorphocerus marki	Sp. nov	Valid	Fanti & Pankowski	Eocene	Prussian Formation (Baltic amber)	Russia (Kaliningrad Oblast)	A soldier beetle.	
Cacomorphocerus meridionalis	Sp. nov	Valid	Kazantsev & Perkovsky	Late Eocene	Rovno amber	Ukraine	A soldier beetle.	
Cacomorphocerus obstinatus	Sp. nov	Valid	Parisi & Fanti	Eocene	Baltic amber	Europe (Baltic Sea region)	A soldier beetle.	
Calymmaderus ambericus	Sp. nov	Valid	Háva & Zahradník	Eocene	Baltic amber	Russia (Kaliningrad Oblast)	A species of Calymmaderus.	
Cantharis crisantha	Sp. nov	Valid	Fanti & Pankowski	Eocene (Priabonian)	Prussian Formation (Baltic amber)	Russia (Kaliningrad Oblast)	A species of Cantharis.	
Cantharis kviumi	Sp. nov	Valid	Fanti & Damgaard	Eocene	Prussian Formation (Baltic amber)	Russia (Kaliningrad Oblast)	A species of Cantharis.	
Cantharis raeorum	Sp. nov	Valid	Fanti & Pankowski	Eocene (Priabonian)	Prussian Formation (Baltic amber)	Russia (Kaliningrad Oblast)	A species of Cantharis.	
Cedasyrus	Gen. et sp. nov	Valid	Yin & Cai in Yin et al.	Cenomanian	Burmese amber	Myanmar	A rove beetle belonging to the subfamily Dasycerinae. The type species is C. dimorphus.	
Cenomana brevicornis	Sp. nov	Valid	Muona	Late Cretaceous (Cenomanian)	Burmese amber	Myanmar	A member of the family Eucnemidae belonging to the subfamily Melasinae. The article naming the species used the spelling Coenomana brevicornis.	
Charhyphus balticus	Sp. nov	Valid	Shavrin & Kairišs	Eocene	Baltic amber	Europe (Baltic Sea region)	A rove beetle belonging to the subfamily Phloeocharinae.	
Chimerogyrus	Gen. et sp. nov	Valid	Gustafson, Michat & Balke	Cenomanian	Burmese amber	Myanmar	A whirligig beetle. Genus includes new species C. gigagalea.	
Cionocups	Gen. et sp. nov	Valid	Kirejtshuk	Cenomanian	Burmese amber	Myanmar	A member of Ommatinae. The type species is C. manukyani.	Cionocups manukyani
Clessidromma zengi	Sp. nov	Valid	Kirejtshuk	Cenomanian	Burmese amber	Myanmar	A member of Ommatinae. Originally described as a species of Clessidromma, but subsequently transferred to the separate genus Kirejtomma.	Kirejtomma zengi
Coptotomus balticus	Sp. nov	Valid	Hendrich & Balke	Eocene	Baltic amber	Europe (Baltic Sea region)	A species of Coptotomus.	
Cretaretes	Gen. et sp. nov	Valid	Peris & Jelínek	Late Cretaceous (Cenomanian)	Burmese amber	Myanmar	Originally described as a member of the family Kateretidae; subsequently argued to be a sap beetle belonging to the subfamily Apophisandrinae or a member of the separate family Apophisandridae. Genus includes new species C. minimus.	
Cretoattagenus	Gen. et sp. nov	Valid	Háva	Late Cretaceous (Cenomanian)	Burmese amber	Myanmar	A member of the family Dermestidae belonging to the subfamily Attageninae. The type species is C. coziki.	
Cretobrevipogon	Gen. et sp. nov	Valid	Cai, Fu & Huang	Early Cretaceous	Yixian	China	A member of the family Artematopodidae. Genus includes new species C. breviantennatus.	
Cretodineutus	Gen. et sp. nov	Valid	Liang et al.	Late Cretaceous (Cenomanian)	Burmese amber	Myanmar	A whirligig beetle. Genus includes new species C. rotundus.	
Cretolenax	Gen. et 2 sp. nov	Valid	Liu et al.	Late Cretaceous (Cenomanian)	Burmese amber	Myanmar	A member of the family Monotomidae. Genus includes new species C. carinatus Liu, Tihelka, McElrath & Yamamoto and C. diabolus Tihelka, Liu, McElrath & Yamamoto.	
Cretolgus	Gen. et sp. nov	In press	Legalov & Háva	Late Cretaceous (Cenomanian)	Burmese amber	Myanmar	A member of the family Bostrichidae belonging to the subfamily Polycaoninae. Genus includes new species C. minimus.	
Cretoprocirrus	Gen. et sp. nov	Valid	Jenkins Shaw & Żyła in Jenkins Shaw et al.	Late Cretaceous (Cenomanian)	Burmese amber	Myanmar	A rove beetle belonging to the subfamily Paederinae and the tribe Pinophilini. The type species is C. trichotos.	
Cretopsectra	Gen. et sp. nov	Valid	Zhao et al.	Cretaceous (Cenomanian)	Burmese amber	Myanmar	A member of the family Brachypsectridae. Genus includes new species C. pulchra.	
Cretopseudopsis	Gen. et sp. nov	Valid	Liu et al.	Late Cretaceous (Cenomanian)	Burmese amber	Myanmar	A rove beetle belonging to the subfamily Pseudopsinae. Genus includes new species C. maweii.	
Cretoptomaphagus	Gen. et sp. nov	In press	Bao & Antunes-Carvalho	Late Cretaceous (Cenomanian)	Burmese amber	Myanmar	A member of the family Leiodidae belonging to the subfamily Cholevinae. Genus includes new species C. microsoma.	
Cupes golovatchi	Sp. nov	Valid	Kirejtshuk	Eocene (Lutetian)	Eckfelder Maar	Germany	A species of Cupes	
Cupes legalovi	Sp. nov	Valid	Kirejtshuk	Eocene (Lutetian)	Eckfelder Maar	Germany	A species of Cupes	
Cupes lutzi	Sp. nov	Valid	Kirejtshuk	Eocene (Lutetian)	Eckfelder Maar	Germany	A species of Cupes	
Cupes nabozhenkoi	Sp. nov	Valid	Kirejtshuk	Eocene (Lutetian)	Messel pit	Germany	A species of Cupes	
Cupes wedmannae	Sp. nov	Valid	Kirejtshuk	Eocene (Lutetian)	Messel pit	Germany	A species of Cupes	
Cupressicharis	Gen. et sp. nov	Valid	Muona	Late Cretaceous (Cenomanian)	Burmese amber	Myanmar	A member of the family Eucnemidae belonging to the subfamily Palaeoxeninae. The type species is C. elongatus.	
Cylus	Gen. et sp. nov	Valid	Muona	Late Cretaceous (Cenomanian)	Burmese amber	Myanmar	A member of the family Eucnemidae belonging to the subfamily Eucneminae. The type species is C. carinifer.	
Diceroderes jiangkuni	Sp. nov	In press	Tihelka et al.	Early Miocene	Mexican amber	Mexico	A darkling beetle belonging to the subfamily Tenebrioninae and the tribe Toxicini.	
Ditysparedrus	Gen. et 4 sp. nov	Valid	Vitali & Legalov	Late Cretaceous (Cenomanian)	Burmese amber	Myanmar	A member of the family Oedemeridae belonging to the subfamily Calopodinae. The type species is D. serixioides; genus also includes D. gigas, D. obscurus and D. uniformis.	
Echinocups	Gen. et comb. nov	Disputed	Kirejtshuk & Jarzembowski in Kirejtshuk	Cretaceous (Albian/Cenomanian)	Burmese amber	Myanmar	A member of Ommatinae. The type species is "Notocupes" neli Tihelka, Huang & Cai (2019). Li et al. (2023) considered the genus Echinocups to be a junior synonym of the genus Notocupes.	
Elasontagius	Gen. et sp. nov	Valid	Alekseev & Bukejs	Eocene	Baltic amber	Russia (Kaliningrad Oblast)	A member of the family Tetratomidae. The type species is E. dorbnickensis.	
Electrolotis hoffeinsorum	Sp. nov	Valid	Szawaryn & Tomaszewska	Eocene	Baltic amber	Europe (Baltic Sea region)	A member of the family Coccinellidae belonging to the tribe Sticholotidini.	
Eledonoprius incoronatus	Sp. nov	Valid	Alekseev, Bukejs & Sontag	Eocene	Baltic amber	Europe (Baltic Sea region)	A darkling beetle	
Elektrokleinia steffenseni	Sp. nov	Valid	Fanti & Damgaard	Late Cretaceous (Cenomanian)	Burmese amber	Myanmar	A soldier beetle.	
Eoceniretes antiquus	Sp. nov	Valid	Peris & Jelínek	Late Cretaceous (Cenomanian)	Burmese amber	Myanmar	Originally described as a member of the family Kateretidae; subsequently argued to be a sap beetle belonging to the subfamily Apophisandrinae or a member of the separate family Apophisandridae. Originally described as a species of Eoceniretes, but subsequently transferred to the genus Protokateretes.	
Epiphanis burmensis	Sp. nov	Valid	Muona	Late Cretaceous (Cenomanian)	Burmese amber	Myanmar	A species of Epiphanis.	
Ernobius arturi	Sp. nov	Valid	Háva & Zahradník	Eocene	Baltic amber	Poland	A species of Ernobius.	
Eucinetus parvus	Sp. nov	Valid	Du et al.	Late Cretaceous (Cenomanian)	Burmese amber	Myanmar	A species of Eucinetus.	
Europoeurypus	Gen. et sp. nov	Valid	Alekseev, Bukejs & Pollock	Eocene	Baltic amber	Russia (Kaliningrad Oblast)	A member of the family Mycteridae belonging to the subfamily Eurypinae. Genus includes new species E. inglaeso.	
Europs makarovi	Sp. nov	Valid	Kupryjanowicz, Lyubarsky & Perkovsky	Miocene	Mexican amber	Mexico	A species of Europs.	
Euryptychus acutangulus	Sp. nov	Valid	Muona	Late Cretaceous (Cenomanian)	Burmese amber	Myanmar	A member of the family Eucnemidae belonging to the subfamily Macraulacinae.	
Euryptychus burmensis	Sp. nov	Valid	Muona	Late Cretaceous (Cenomanian)	Burmese amber	Myanmar	A member of the family Eucnemidae belonging to the subfamily Macraulacinae.	
Euryptychus elegantulus	Sp. nov	Valid	Muona	Late Cretaceous (Cenomanian)	Burmese amber	Myanmar	A member of the family Eucnemidae belonging to the subfamily Macraulacinae.	
Euryptychus mysticus	Sp. nov	Valid	Muona	Late Cretaceous (Cenomanian)	Burmese amber	Myanmar	A member of the family Eucnemidae belonging to the subfamily Macraulacinae.	
Excavotarsus	Gen. et 2 sp. nov	Valid	Li et al.	Late Cretaceous (Cenomanian)	Burmese amber	Myanmar	A member of the family Heteroceridae. Genus includes new species E. lini and E. minor.	
Falsothambus	Gen. et 2 sp. nov	Valid	Muona	Late Cretaceous (Cenomanian)	Burmese amber	Myanmar	A member of the family Eucnemidae belonging to the subfamily Eucneminae. The type species is F. burmensis; genus also includes F. gracilicornis.	
Fiegelia	Gen. et 2 sp. nov	Valid	Muona	Late Cretaceous (Cenomanian)	Burmese amber	Myanmar	A member of the family Eucnemidae. The type species is F. antennata; genus also includes F. tarsalis.	
Gondvanocoleus	Gen. et sp. nov	Valid	Ponomarenko in Ponomarenko et al.	Permian (Lopingian)	Croudace Bay	Australia	A member of archostemata belonging to the family Asiocoleidae. The type species is G. chikatunovi.	
Groehnaltica	Gen. et sp. nov	Valid	Bukejs, Reid & Biondi	Eocene	Baltic amber	Europe (Baltic Sea region)	A flea beetle. Genus includes new species G. batophiloides.	
Hapsomela minor	Sp. nov	Valid	Yin	Late Cretaceous (Cenomanian)	Burmese amber	Myanmar	An ant-like stone beetle.	
Hapsomela tibialis	Sp. nov	Valid	Yin	Late Cretaceous (Cenomanian)	Burmese amber	Myanmar	An ant-like stone beetle.	
Holoparamecus hoffeinsorum	Sp. nov	Valid	Reike & Alekseev in Reike et al.	Eocene	Baltic amber Bitterfeld amber	Germany; Poland Russia (Kaliningrad Oblast)	A species of Holoparamecus.	
Holoparamecus paschalis	Sp. nov	Valid	Reike & Alekseev in Reike et al.	Eocene	Baltic amber	Russia (Kaliningrad Oblast)	A species of Holoparamecus.	
Igneonasus	Gen. et sp. nov	Valid	Legalov & Poschmann	Late Oligocene	Enspel Formation	Germany	A member of the family Curculionidae belonging to the tribe Ceutorhynchini. The type species is I. rudolphi.	
Jarzembowskiops	Gen. et comb. nov	Valid	Kirejtshuk	Cretaceous (Albian/Cenomanian)	Burmese amber	Myanmar	A member of Ommatinae. The type species is "Brochocoleus" caseyi Jarzembowski, Wang & Zheng (2016).	
Jenibuntor pusillus	Sp. nov	Valid	Muona	Late Cretaceous (Cenomanian)	Burmese amber	Myanmar	A member of the family Eucnemidae belonging to the subfamily Macraulacinae.	
Kuskaella petriolii	Sp. nov	Valid	Fanti & Vitali	Eocene	Baltic amber	Russia (Kaliningrad Oblast)	A soldier beetle.	
Lenax karenae	Sp. nov	In press	Liu, Tihelka, McElrath & Yamamoto in Liu et al.	Late Cretaceous (Cenomanian)	Burmese amber	Myanmar	A species of Lenax	
Lepiceratus	Gen. et sp. nov	Valid	Jałoszyński et al.	Late Cretaceous (Cenomanian)	Burmese amber	Myanmar	A stem group member of the family Lepiceridae. Genus includes new species L. ankylosaurus.	
Lepidomma jarzembowskii	Sp. nov	Valid	Li et al.	Late Cretaceous (Cenomanian)	Burmese amber	Myanmar	A member of the family Ommatidae.	
Lepidomma longisquama	Sp. nov	Valid	Li et al.	Late Cretaceous (Cenomanian)	Burmese amber	Myanmar	A member of the family Ommatidae.	
Linsleyonides bucarensis	Sp. nov	Valid	Vitali	Miocene	Dominican amber	Dominican Republic	A species of Linsleyonides.	
Litargus (Litargosomus) dantiscensis	Sp. nov	Valid	Alekseev, Kupryjanowicz & Bukejs in Alekseev et al.	Eocene	Baltic amber	Europe (Baltic Sea region)	A species of Litargus.	
Lobanovia	Gen. et comb. nov	Valid	Kirejtshuk	Permian (Lopingian)		Russia	A member of the family Permocupedidae belonging to the subfamily Taldycupedinae. The type species is "Simmondsia" permiana Ponomarenko (2013).	
Loeblitoides	Gen. et sp. nov	Valid	Jałoszyński	Late Cretaceous (Cenomanian)	Burmese amber	Myanmar	An ant-like stone beetle belonging to the tribe Stenichnini. Genus includes new species L. separatus.	
Lycocerus elzbietae	Sp. nov	Valid	Kazantsev	Eocene	Baltic amber	Europe (Baltic Sea region)	A soldier beetle.	
Lycocerus jonasi	Sp. nov	Valid	Kazantsev	Eocene	Baltic amber	Europe (Baltic Sea region)	A soldier beetle.	
Lycocerus xenium	Sp. nov	Valid	Fanti	Eocene (Lutetian to Priabonian)	Baltic amber	Poland	A soldier beetle.	
Madelinia	Gen. et sp. nov	Valid	Alekseev & Pankowski	Eocene	Baltic amber	Europe (Baltic Sea region)	A member of the family Melandryidae belonging to the tribe Hypulini. Genus includes new species M. gedanoposita.	
Mallecupes prokini	Sp. nov	Valid	Kirejtshuk	Cretaceous (Albian/Cenomanian)	Burmese amber	Myanmar	A member of the family Cupedidae	
Malthodes giannii	Sp. nov	Valid	Parisi & Fanti	Eocene	Baltic amber	Europe (Baltic Sea region)	A species of Malthodes.	
Malthodes immortalis	Sp. nov	Valid	Parisi & Fanti	Eocene	Baltic amber	Europe (Baltic Sea region)	A species of Malthodes.	
Malthodes marialuisae	Sp. nov	Valid	Parisi & Fanti	Eocene	Baltic amber	Europe (Baltic Sea region)	A species of Malthodes.	
Malthodes unimol	Sp. nov	Valid	Parisi & Fanti	Eocene	Baltic amber	Europe (Baltic Sea region)	A species of Malthodes.	
Mesolophocateres	Gen. et sp. nov	Disputed	Yu, Leschen & Ślipiński in Yu et al.	Late Cretaceous (Cenomanian)	Burmese amber	Myanmar	A member of the family Lophocateridae. Genus includes new species M. pengweii. Li et al. (2021) considered it to be a junior synonym of Burmacateres longicoxa.	
Mesozenodosus	Gen. et sp. nov	Valid	Tihelka et al.	Late Cretaceous (Cenomanian)	Charentese amber	France	A member of the family Thanerocleridae. Genus includes new species M. insularis.	
Micrillus electrus	Sp. nov	Valid	Bogri et al.	Eocene	Baltic amber	Europe (Baltic Sea region)	A rove beetle.	
Micropeplus pengweii	Sp. nov	Valid	Jiang, Peng & Wang	Late Cretaceous (Cenomanian)	Burmese amber	Myanmar	A species of Micropeplus	
Miniomma	Gen. et sp. nov		Li, Yamamoto & Cai in Li et al.	Cretaceous (Albian-Cenomanian)	Burmese amber	Myanmar	A member of the family Ommatidae. The type species is M. chenkuni.	Miniomma chenkuni
Multispinus parvus	Sp. nov	Valid	Bao	Late Cretaceous (Cenomanian)	Burmese amber	Myanmar	A member of the family Mordellidae.	
Muonabuntor	Gen. et sp. nov	Valid	Li et al.	Late Cretaceous (Cenomanian)	Burmese amber	Myanmar	A member of the family Eucnemidae. Genus includes new species M. grandinotalis.	
Myall burmensis	Sp. nov	Valid	Muona	Late Cretaceous (Cenomanian)	Burmese amber	Myanmar	A member of the family Eucnemidae belonging to the subfamily Eucneminae.	
Myanmarops	Gen. et sp. nov	Valid	Legalov, Kirejtshuk & Anokhin	Late Cretaceous (Cenomanian)	Burmese amber	Myanmar	A seed beetle. Genus includes new species M. gatiosus.	
Neolitochropus michalskii	Sp. nov	Valid	Háva	Eocene	Baltic amber	Poland	A member of the family Cyclaxyridae.	
Neomida groehni	Sp. nov	Valid	Nabozhenko & Bukejs in Nabozhenko, Kairišs & Bukejs	Eocene	Baltic amber	Europe (Baltic Sea region)	A species of Neomida.	
Notocupes denticollis	Sp. nov	Valid	Jiang et al.	Late Cretaceous (Cenomanian)	Burmese amber	Myanmar	Originally described as a member of the family Cupedidae and a species of Notocupes; Kirejtshuk (2020) transferred this species to the ommatine genus Echinocups, but Li et al. (2023) transferred it back to the genus Notocupes.	
Notocupes ohmkuhnlei	Sp. nov	Valid	Jarzembowski, Wang & Zheng	Late Cretaceous (Cenomanian)	Burmese amber	Myanmar	Originally described as a member of the family Cupedidae and a species of Notocupes; Kirejtshuk (2020) transferred this species to the ommatine genus Echinocups, but Li et al. (2023) transferred it back to the genus Notocupes.	
Olibrolitus	Gen. et sp. nov	Disputed	Lyubarsky & Perkovsky	Eocene	Baltic amber Bitterfeld amber	Baltic Sea region Germany	Originally described as a member of the family Phalacridae. The type species is O. katyae. Gimmel & Szawaryn (2020) considered O. katyae to be a junior synonym of the cyclaxyrid species Neolitochropus bedovoyi.	
Omma davidbatteni	Sp. nov	Valid	Jarzembowski, Wang & Zheng	Late Cretaceous (Cenomanian)	Burmese amber	Myanmar	A species of Omma	
Omma janetae	Sp. nov	Valid	Kirejtshuk	Cretaceous (Albian/Cenomanian)	Burmese amber	Myanmar	A species of Omma	
Onthophilus yingae	Sp. nov	Valid	Jiang et al.	Late Cretaceous (Cenomanian)	Burmese amber	Myanmar	A species of Onthophilus	
Palaeobasanus	Gen. et sp. nov	Valid	Nabozhenko & Kirejtshuk	Paleocene	Menat	France	A darkling beetle belonging to the subfamily Diaperinae and the tribe Scaphidemini. The type species is P. neli.	
Palaeonecrophilus	Gen. et sp. nov	Valid	Strelnikova, Yan & Vasilenko	Early Cretaceous		Russia	A member of the family Agyrtidae. Genus includes new species P. buryaticus.	
Paleobiphyllus	Gen. et sp. nov	Valid	Makarov & Perkovsky	Late Cretaceous (Santonian)	Taimyr amber	Russia	A member of the family Biphyllidae. Genus includes new species P. ponomarenkoi.	
Paleoendeitoma tuberculata	Sp. nov	Valid	Bullis	Late Cretaceous (Cenomanian)	Burmese amber	Myanmar	A member of the family Zopheridae belonging to the subfamily Colydiinae	
Paleoeucnemis	Gen. et sp. nov	Valid	Muona	Late Cretaceous (Cenomanian)	Burmese amber	Myanmar	A member of the family Eucnemidae belonging to the subfamily Eucneminae. The type species is P. minutus.	
Palpattalusinus	Gen. et sp. nov	Valid	Tshernyshev	Eocene	Baltic amber	Europe (Baltic Sea region)	A member of Malachiinae. The type species is P. transitivus.	
Pangusyndicus longirostris	Sp. nov	In press	Jałoszyński	Late Cretaceous (Cenomanian)	Burmese amber	Myanmar	An ant-like stone beetle belonging to the tribe Glandulariini.	
Paratimia succinicola	Sp. nov	Valid	Vitali	Eocene	Baltic amber	Europe (Baltic Sea region)	A species of Paratimia.	
Paratractocerus	Gen. et sp. nov	Valid	Nazarenko, Perkovsky & Vasilenko	Eocene	Baltic amber	Europe (Baltic Sea region)	A member of the family Lymexylidae. Genus includes new species P. gusakovi.	
Parayixianteres	Gen. et sp. nov	In press	Yu, Leschen & Ślipiński in Yu et al.	Late Cretaceous (Cenomanian)	Burmese amber	Myanmar	A member of the family Lophocateridae. Genus includes new species P. parvus.	
Phoroschizus	Nom. nov	Valid	Bouchard & Bousquet	Jurassic	Karabastau	Kazakhstan	A replacement name for Schizophorus Ponomarenko (1968)	
Pintolla	Gen. et comb. nov	Valid	Kirejtshuk	Permian (Artinskian/Kungurian)		Brazil	A member of the family Permocupedidae belonging to the subfamily Permocupedinae. The type species is "Kaltanicupes" ponomarenkoi Pinto (1987).	
Pleuroceratos jiewenae	Sp. nov	Valid	Tihelka, Huang & Cai	Late Cretaceous (Cenomanian)	Burmese amber	Myanmar	A member of the family Phloeostichidae.	
Podistra jirii	Sp. nov	Valid	Fanti	Eocene (Lutetian to Priabonian)	Baltic amber	Poland	A soldier beetle.	
Podistra mattheseni	Sp. nov	Valid	Fanti & Damgaard	Eocene	Prussian Formation (Baltic amber)	Russia (Kaliningrad Oblast)	A soldier beetle.	
Podosilis gedaniensis	Sp. nov	Valid	Kazantsev	Eocene	Baltic amber	Europe (Baltic Sea region)	A soldier beetle.	
Poinarelektronmiles	Gen. et sp. nov	Disputed	Fanti & Damgaard	Late Cretaceous (Cenomanian)	Burmese amber	Myanmar	A soldier beetle. The type species is P. ellenbergeri. Considered to be a junior synonym of the genus Burmomiles by Yang, Zhao & Liu (2024), though the authors maintained P. ellenbergeri as a distinct species within the latter genus.	
Polyakius	Gen. et 2 sp. nov	Valid	Kirejtshuk	Cretaceous (Albian/Cenomanian)	Burmese amber	Myanmar	A member of Ommatinae. The type species is P. alberti; genus also includes P. pubescens.	Polyakius alberti
Praezolodinus	Gen. et sp. nov	In press	Bao & Antunes-Carvalho	Late Cretaceous (Cenomanian)	Burmese amber	Myanmar	A darkling beetle belonging to the subfamily Zolodininae. Genus includes new species P. pilosus.	
Premalachius	Gen. et sp. nov	Valid	Tshernyshev	Eocene	Baltic amber	Europe (Baltic Sea region)	A member of Malachiinae. The type species is P. obscurus.	
Protodasycerus corpulentus	Sp. nov	Valid	Yin & Cai in Yin et al.	Cretaceous (Albian to Cenomanian)	Burmese amber	Myanmar	A rove beetle belonging to the subfamily Dasycerinae.	
Protodasycerus gigas	Sp. nov	Valid	Yin & Cai in Yin et al.	Cretaceous (Albian to Cenomanian)	Burmese amber	Myanmar	A rove beetle belonging to the subfamily Dasycerinae.	
Protodasycerus tuberculatus	Sp. nov	Valid	Yamamoto, Newton & Yin in Yin et al.	Cretaceous (Albian to Cenomanian)	Burmese amber	Myanmar	A rove beetle belonging to the subfamily Dasycerinae.	
Protomicrorhagus	Gen. et 2 sp. nov	Valid	Muona	Late Cretaceous (Cenomanian)	Burmese amber	Myanmar	A member of the family Eucnemidae belonging to the subfamily Melasinae. The type species is P. antennatus; genus also includes P. brevis.	
Protopassalus	Gen. et sp. nov	In press	Santos et al.	Early Cretaceous (Aptian)	Crato Formation	Brazil	A member of the family Passalidae. Genus includes new species P. araripensis.	
Protopselaphus newtoni	Sp. nov	Valid	Liu et al.	Late Cretaceous (Cenomanian)	Burmese amber	Myanmar		
Protopselaphus thayerae	Sp. nov	Valid	Liu et al.	Cretaceous (Albian–Cenomanian)	Burmese amber	Myanmar	A rove beetle belonging to the subfamily Protopselaphinae.	
Prototrichalus	Gen. et 3 sp. nov	Valid	Molino-Olmedo et al.	Late Cretaceous (Cenomanian)	Burmese amber	Myanmar	A beetle of uncertain phylogenetic placement, possibly a member of the family Lycidae or a member of Tenebrionoidea, possibly belonging to the family Ischaliidae. Genus includes new species P. sepronai, P. meiyingae and P. milleri.	
Protovitellius	Gen. et sp. nov	Valid	Muona	Late Cretaceous (Cenomanian)	Burmese amber	Myanmar	A member of the family Eucnemidae belonging to the subfamily Eucneminae. The type species is P. deceptus.	
Pseudomyall	Gen. et sp. nov	Valid	Muona	Late Cretaceous (Cenomanian)	Burmese amber	Myanmar	A member of the family Eucnemidae belonging to the subfamily Eucneminae. The type species is P. elongatulus.	
Ptinus electron	Sp. nov	Valid	Háva & Zahradník	Eocene	Baltic amber	Russia (Kaliningrad Oblast)	A species of Ptinus.	
Ptinus fantii	Sp. nov	Valid	Háva & Zahradník	Eocene	Baltic amber	Russia (Kaliningrad Oblast)	A species of Ptinus.	
Ptinus groehni	Sp. nov	Valid	Háva & Zahradník	Eocene	Baltic amber	Russia (Kaliningrad Oblast)	A species of Ptinus.	
Retromalisus	Gen. et sp. nov	Valid	Kazantsev	Eocene	Baltic amber	Baltic Sea region	A member of Elateroidea belonging to the family Berendtimiridae. Genus includes new species R. damzeni.	
Rhagonycha acarigera	Sp. nov	Valid	Kazantsev	Eocene	Baltic amber	Europe (Baltic Sea region)	A species of Rhagonycha.	
Rhyzobius groehni	Sp. nov	Valid	Szawaryn & Tomaszewska	Eocene	Baltic amber	Europe (Baltic Sea region)	A species of Rhyzobius.	
Rhyzobius sontagae	Sp. nov	Valid	Szawaryn & Tomaszewska	Eocene	Baltic amber	Europe (Baltic Sea region)	A species of Rhyzobius.	
Rhyzobius szwedo	Sp. nov	Valid	Szawaryn & Tomaszewska	Eocene	Baltic amber	Europe (Baltic Sea region)	A species of Rhyzobius.	
Sanaungulus lethi	Sp. nov	Valid	Fanti & Damgaard	Late Cretaceous (Cenomanian)	Burmese amber	Myanmar	A soldier beetle. Transferred to the genus Burmomiles by Yang, Zhao & Liu (2024).	
Sanaungulus morellii	Sp. nov	Valid	Fanti & Damgaard	Late Cretaceous (Cenomanian)	Burmese amber	Myanmar	A soldier beetle.	
Sanaungulus rosenzweigi	Sp. nov	Valid	Fanti & Damgaard	Late Cretaceous (Cenomanian)	Burmese amber	Myanmar	A soldier beetle.	
Scydmaenus linqibini	Sp. nov	Valid	Yin & Zhou	Late Cretaceous (Cenomanian)	Burmese amber	Myanmar	An ant-like stone beetle.	
Scydmobisetia dentipes	Sp. nov	Valid	Jałoszyński & Bai in Jałoszyński, Bai & Wang	Late Cretaceous (Cenomanian)	Burmese amber	Myanmar	An ant-like stone beetle.	
Scymbalium phaethoni	Sp. nov	Valid	Bogri et al.	Eocene	Baltic amber	Europe (Baltic Sea region)	A rove beetle.	
Semicoxelus	Gen. et sp. nov	Valid	Alekseev & Pankowski	Eocene	Baltic amber	Russia (Kaliningrad Oblast)	A member of the family Zopheridae belonging to the subfamily Colydiinae and the tribe Synchitini. The type species is S. sontagae.	
Sieglindea antiqua	Sp. nov	Valid	Muona	Late Cretaceous (Cenomanian)	Burmese amber	Myanmar	A member of the family Eucnemidae belonging to the subfamily Eucneminae.	
Sphingoquedius meto	Sp. nov	Valid	Jenkins Shaw et al.	Early Miocene	Foulden Maar	New Zealand	A rove beetle belonging to the subfamily Staphylininae and the tribe Amblyopinini.	
Stagetus arturi	Sp. nov	Valid	Háva & Zahradník	Eocene	Baltic amber	Poland	A species of Stagetus.	
Stegastochlidus	Gen. et sp. nov	Valid	Poinar & Vega	Late Cretaceous (Cenomanian)	Burmese amber	Myanmar	A cylindrical bark beetle. The type species is S. saraemcheana.	
Stegocoleus arkonus	Sp. nov	Valid	Tihelka, Huang & Cai	Late Cretaceous (Cenomanian)	Burmese amber	Myanmar	A member of the family Ommatidae.	
Stegocoleus lawrencei	Sp. nov	In press	Tihelka, Huang & Cai	Late Cretaceous (Cenomanian)	Burmese amber	Myanmar	A member of the family Ommatidae.	
Succinometrioxena attenuata	Sp. nov	Valid	Legalov & Poinar	Eocene	Baltic amber	Europe (Baltic Sea region)	An oxycorynine belid weevil.	
Sucinorhagonycha groehni	Sp. nov	Valid	Kazantsev	Eocene	Baltic amber	Europe (Baltic Sea region)	A soldier beetle.	
Syntelia sunwukong	Sp. nov	In press	Jiang & Wang	Late Cretaceous (Cenomanian)	Burmese amber	Myanmar	A species of Syntelia.	
Tachyerges hyperoche	Sp. nov	Valid	Legalov & Poinar	Eocene	Baltic amber	Europe (Baltic Sea region)	A weevil belonging to the tribe Rhamphini.	
Tanyrhamphis	Gen. et sp. nov	Valid	Poinar & Legalov	Miocene	Dominican amber	Dominican Republic	A curculionid weevil belonging to the tribe Madarini. Genus includes new species T. rhadinoalibus.	
Telmatophilus sidorchukae	Sp. nov	Valid	Lyubarsky & Perkovsky	Eocene (Priabonian)	Rovno amber	Ukraine	A species of Telmatophilus.	
Toxorhynchus europeoeocenicus	Sp. nov	Valid	Bukejs & Legalov	Late Eocene	Rovno amber	Ukraine	A weevil belonging to the family Brentidae and the subfamily Apioninae.	
Trialarva	Gen. et sp. nov	Valid	Prokin & Bashkuev	Late Triassic	Hassberge Formation	Germany	Probably an aquatic larva of beetle. Genus includes new species T. coburgensis. Announced in 2020; the final version of the article naming it was published in 2021.	
Trihelota	Gen. et sp. nov.	Valid	Tihelka, Huang & Cai	Cretaceous (Albian–Cenomanian)	Burmese amber	Myanmar	A member of the family Helotidae. The type species is T. fulvata.	
Trixagosoma	Gen. et sp. nov	Valid	Li et al.	Late Cretaceous (Cenomanian)	Burmese amber	Myanmar	A member of the family Throscidae. Genus includes new species T. guangyuani.	
Vetubrachypsectra	Gen. et sp. nov	Valid	Qu et al.	Late Cretaceous (Cenomanian)	Burmese amber	Myanmar	A member of the family Brachypsectridae. Genus includes new species V. burmitica.	
Xestobium michalskii	Sp. nov	Valid	Háva & Zahradník	Eocene	Baltic amber	Poland	A species of Xestobium.	
Xyletinus carsteni	Sp. nov	Valid	Háva & Zahradník	Eocene	Baltic amber	Russia (Kaliningrad Oblast)	A species of Xyletinus.	

=== Strepsiptera ===
Name	Novelty	Status	Authors	Age	Type locality	Country	Notes	Images
Heterobathmilla	Gen. et sp. nov	Valid	Pohl & Beutel in Pohl et al.	Late Cretaceous (Cenomanian)	Burmese amber	Myanmar	A member of the stem group of Strepsiptera belonging to the family Phthanoxenidae. The type species is H. kakopoios.	

== Clade Dictyoptera ==
Name	Novelty	Status	Authors	Age	Type locality	Country	Notes	Images
Ano	Gen. et 3 sp. nov	Valid	Vršanský	Middle Jurassic	Bakhar Formation	Mongolia	A cockroach belonging to the superfamily Corydioidea and the family Liberiblattinidae. The type species is A. da; genus also includes new species A. net and A. nym.	
Antophiloblatta	Gen. et sp. nov	Valid	Sendi in Sendi et al.	Late Cretaceous (Cenomanian)	Burmese amber	Myanmar	A cockroach belonging to the superfamily Umenocoleoidea. Genus includes new species A. hispida.	
Blattula anuniversala	Sp. nov	Valid	Vršanský	Middle Jurassic	Bakhar Formation	Mongolia	A cockroach belonging to the family Blattulidae.	
Blattula bacharensis	Sp. nov	Valid	Vršanský	Middle Jurassic	Bakhar Formation	Mongolia	A cockroach belonging to the family Blattulidae.	
Blattula flamma	Sp. nov	Valid	Vršanský	Middle Jurassic	Bakhar Formation	Mongolia	A cockroach belonging to the family Blattulidae.	
Blattula mikro	Sp. nov	Valid	Vršanský	Middle Jurassic	Bakhar Formation	Mongolia	A cockroach belonging to the family Blattulidae.	
Blattula mini	Sp. nov	Valid	Vršanský	Middle Jurassic	Bakhar Formation	Mongolia	A cockroach belonging to the family Blattulidae.	
Blattula universala	Sp. nov	Valid	Vršanský	Middle Jurassic	Bakhar Formation	Mongolia	A cockroach belonging to the family Blattulidae.	
Blattula velika	Sp. nov	Valid	Vršanský	Middle Jurassic	Bakhar Formation	Mongolia	A cockroach belonging to the family Blattulidae.	
Blattula vulgara	Sp. nov	Valid	Vršanský	Middle Jurassic	Bakhar Formation	Mongolia	A cockroach belonging to the family Blattulidae.	
Bubosa	Gen. et sp. nov	Valid	Šmídová	Late Cretaceous (Cenomanian)	Burmese amber	Myanmar	A cockroach belonging to the family Blattidae. Genus includes new species B. poinari.	
Caloblattina vremeni	Sp. nov	Valid	Vršanský	Middle Jurassic	Bakhar Formation	Mongolia	A cockroach belonging to the family Caloblattinidae.	
Cercoula	Gen. et sp. nov	In press	Li & Huang	Late Cretaceous (Cenomanian)	Burmese amber	Myanmar	A cockroach belonging to the group Blattoidea. Genus includes new species C. brachyptera.	
Crenocticola	Gen. et 2 sp. nov	Valid	Li & Huang	Late Cretaceous (Cenomanian)	Burmese amber	Myanmar	A stem member of Nocticolidae. Genus includes new species C. burmanica and C. svadba.	
Cretaperiplaneta	Gen. et sp. nov	Valid	Qiu, Che & Wang in Qiu et al.	Late Cretaceous (Cenomanian)	Burmese amber	Myanmar	A member of the family Blattidae. Genus includes new species C. kaonashi.	
Dostavba	Gen. et sp. nov	Valid	Vršanský	Middle Jurassic	Bakhar Formation	Mongolia	A cockroach belonging to the superfamily Corydioidea and the family Liberiblattinidae. The type species is D. pre.	
Enervipraeala	Gen. et sp. nov	In press	Luo, Xu & Jarzembowski	Late Cretaceous (Cenomanian)	Burmese amber	Myanmar	A member of the family Umenocoleidae. Genus includes new species E. nigra.	
Hra	Gen. et 3 sp. nov	Valid	Vršanský	Middle Jurassic	Bakhar Formation	Mongolia	A cockroach belonging to the superfamily Corydioidea and the family Liberiblattinidae. The type species is H. disko; genus also includes new species H. bavi and H. nie.	
Ithytermes	Gen. et sp. nov	Valid	Sánchez-García et al.	Early Cretaceous (Albian)		Spain	A termite. Genus includes new species I. montoyai.	
Lepidopterix	Gen. et sp. nov	Valid	Sendi in Sendi et al.	Early Cretaceous (Barremian)	Lebanese amber	Lebanon	A cockroach belonging to the superfamily Umenocoleoidea and the family Umenocoleidae or to the family Cratovitismidae. Genus includes new species L. vegrandis.	
Mastotermes brasiliensis	Sp. nov	Valid	Bezerra, Mendes & De Souza	Late Eocene-early Oligocene	Fonseca Formation	Brazil	A termite, a species of Mastotermes.	
Mesoblatta	Gen. et sp. nov		Hinkelman in Hinkelman & Vršanská	Late Cretaceous (Cenomanian)	Burmese amber	Myanmar	A cockroach belonging to the family Mesoblattinidae. Genus includes new species M. maxi.	
Mulleriblattina	Gen. et sp. nov	In press	Sendi et al.	Late Cretaceous (Cenomanian)	Burmese amber	Myanmar	A member of the family Nocticolidae. Genus includes new species M. bowangi.	
Nuurcala cela	Sp. nov	Valid	Vršanský	Middle Jurassic	Bakhar Formation	Mongolia	A cockroach belonging to the family Caloblattinidae.	
Okras	Gen. et sp. nov	Valid	Vršanský	Middle Jurassic	Bakhar Formation	Mongolia	A cockroach belonging to the family Caloblattinidae. The type species is O. sarko.	
Parastylotermes nathani	Sp. nov	Valid	Perkovsky in Perkovsky & Vasilenko	Late Eocene	Rovno amber	Ukraine	A termite belonging to the family Stylotermitidae.	
Perlucipecta cosmopolitana	Sp. nov	Valid	Vršanský	Middle Jurassic	Bakhar Formation	Mongolia	A cockroach belonging to the family Mesoblattinidae.	
Perspicuus	Gen. et 2 sp. nov	Valid	Koubová in Koubová & Mlynský	Late Cretaceous (Cenomanian)	Burmese amber	Myanmar	A cockroach belonging to the family Umenocoleidae or Cratovitismidae. The type species is P. vrsanskyi Mlynský; genus also includes P. pilosus Koubová.	
Polliciblattula	Gen. et 3 sp. nov	Valid	Vršanský	Middle Jurassic	Bakhar Formation	Mongolia	A cockroach belonging to the family Blattulidae. Genus includes new species P. analis, P. tatosanerata and P. vana.	
Praeblattella jurassica	Sp. nov	Valid	Vršanský	Middle Jurassic	Bakhar Formation	Mongolia	A cockroach belonging to the family Mesoblattinidae.	
Raphidiomima chimnata	Sp. nov	Valid	Vršanský	Middle Jurassic	Bakhar Formation	Mongolia	A cockroach belonging to the family Raphidiomimidae.	
Raphidiomima krajka	Sp. nov	Valid	Vršanský	Middle Jurassic	Bakhar Formation	Mongolia	A cockroach belonging to the family Raphidiomimidae.	
Rhipidoblattina bakharensis	Sp. nov	Valid	Vršanský	Middle Jurassic	Bakhar Formation	Mongolia	A cockroach belonging to the family Caloblattinidae.	
Rhipidoblattina konserva	Sp. nov	Valid	Vršanský	Middle Jurassic	Bakhar Formation	Mongolia	A cockroach belonging to the family Caloblattinidae.	
Rhipidoblattina sisnerahkab	Sp. nov	Valid	Vršanský	Middle Jurassic	Bakhar Formation	Mongolia	A cockroach belonging to the family Caloblattinidae.	
Solemnia togokhudukhensis	Sp. nov	Valid	Vršanský	Middle Jurassic	Bakhar Formation	Mongolia	A cockroach belonging to the family Caloblattinidae.	
Spongistoma	Gen. et sp. nov	Valid	Hinkelman in Sendi et al.	Late Cretaceous (Cenomanian)	Burmese amber	Myanmar	A cockroach belonging to the superfamily Corydioidea and the family Liberiblattinidae. Genus includes new species S. angusta.	
Stavba jarzembowskii	Sp. nov	In press	Li et al.	Late Cretaceous (Cenomanian)	Burmese amber	Myanmar	A predatory cockroach belonging to the family Liberiblattinidae.	
Stavba vrsanskyi	Sp. nov	Valid	Chen, Xu & Chen	Late Cretaceous (Cenomanian)	Burmese amber	Myanmar	A predatory cockroach belonging to the family Liberiblattinidae.	
Truhla	Gen. et sp. nov	Valid	Vršanský	Middle Jurassic	Bakhar Formation	Mongolia	A cockroach belonging to the family Blattulidae. The type species is T. vekov.	
Vzrkadlenie	Gen. et sp. nov	Valid	Vršanský in Sendi et al.	Late Cretaceous (Cenomanian)	Burmese amber	Myanmar	A member of the family Alienopteridae or Cratovitismidae. Genus includes new species V. miso.	

=== Dictyopteran research ===
- A new assemblage of nests produced by social insects is described from the Brushy Basin Member of the Upper Jurassic Morrison Formation (Utah, United States) by Smith, Loewen & Kirkland (2020), who name a new ichnotaxon Eopolis ekdalei. The nests are attributed to soil dwelling social termites, suggesting an early Jurassic transition to ground nesting in arid areas for the group.
- A study on the phylogenetic relationships of the Cretaceous insect Umenocoleus is published by Beutel, Luo & Wipfler (2020).
- A study on the evolutionary history of dictyopterans, based on molecular and fossil data, is published by Condamine et al. (2020).
- Fossil oothecae produced by dictyopteran insects, representing the earliest fossil evidence of oothecae reported so far, are described from the Upper Triassic (Carnian) Potrerillos Formation (Argentina) by Cariglino, Lara & Zavattieri (2020), who name new ichnotaxa Oothecichnus pensilis and Oothecichnus duraznensis.

== Clade Eoblattida ==
Name	Novelty	Status	Authors	Age	Type locality	Country	Notes	Images
Babakhosara	Gen. et sp. nov	Valid	Aristov	Late Permian		Russia	A member of Polyneoptera belonging to the group Eoblattida and the family Megakhosaridae. Genus includes new species B. mediana.	
Babala	Gen. et sp. nov	Valid	Aristov	Late Permian		Russia	A member of Polyneoptera belonging to the group Eoblattida. Genus includes new species B. aba.	
Baharellinus arctous	Sp. nov	Valid	Aristov	Late Permian		Russia	A member of Polyneoptera belonging to the group Eoblattida and the family Blattogryllidae.	
Baharellinus vasilenkoi	Sp. nov	Valid	Aristov	Late Permian		Russia	A member of Polyneoptera belonging to the group Eoblattida and the family Blattogryllidae.	
Mesoblattogryllus palаeozoicus	Sp. nov	Valid	Aristov	Late Permian		Russia	A member of Polyneoptera belonging to the group Eoblattida and the family Megakhosaridae.	
Protoblattogryllus sibiricus	Sp. nov	Valid	Aristov	Late Permian		Russia	A member of Polyneoptera belonging to the group Eoblattida and the family Megakhosaridae.	

== Hymenopterans ==
Name	Novelty	Status	Authors	Age	Type locality	Country	Notes	Images
Abrotoxyela curva	Sp. nov	Valid	Zheng et al.	Middle Jurassic	Jiulongshan Formation	China	A member of the family Xyelidae.	
Acropiesta perrichoti	Sp. nov	Valid	Jouault & Nel	Eocene	Baltic amber	Europe (Baltic Sea region)	A member of the family Diapriidae belonging to the subfamily Belytinae.	
Alivespa	Gen. et 2 sp. nov	In press	Wu et al.	Late Cretaceous (Cenomanian)	Burmese amber	Myanmar	A member of the family Vespidae belonging to the subfamily Priorvespinae. Genus includes new species A. hirta and A. colossa.	
Ampulicomorpha quesnoyensis	Sp. nov	Valid	Chény et al.	Eocene (Ypresian)		France	A member of the family Embolemidae.	
Ampulicomorpha testacea	Sp. nov	Valid	Olmi et al.	Cretaceous	Hkamti amber	Myanmar	A member of the family Embolemidae.	
Aphaenogaster enspelensis	Sp. nov	Valid	Jessen	Late Oligocene	Enspel Formation	Germany	An ant, a species of Aphaenogaster.	
Aquilomyrmex	Gen. et sp. nov	Valid	Perrichot, Wang & Barden	Cretaceous (Albian–Cenomanian)	Burmese amber	Myanmar	A haidomyrmecine ant. Type species A. huangi.	Aquilomyrmex huangi
Archaeodryinus	Gen. et comb. nov	In press	Olmi et al.	Early Cretaceous (Barremian)	Lebanese amber	Lebanon	A member of the family Dryinidae; a new genus for "Aphelopus" palaeophoenicius Olmi (2000).	
Archaeoserphites engeli	Sp. nov	Valid	Rasnitsyn & Öhm-Kühnle	Late Cretaceous (Cenomanian)	Burmese amber	Myanmar	A wasp belonging to the family Archaeoserphitidae.	
Archaeovespa	Gen. et 3 sp. nov	Valid	Wu et al.	Late Cretaceous (Cenomanian)	Burmese amber	Myanmar	A wasp belonging to the family Vespidae. The type species is A. engeli; genus also includes A. cretacea and A. malleata.	
Archaeromma trigonokephalion	Sp. nov	In press	Cockx et al.	Late Cretaceous (Campanian)	Wapiti Formation	Canada	A member of the family Mymarommatidae.	
Bocchus schmalhauseni	Sp. nov	Valid	Perkovsky et al.	Eocene	Rovno amber	Ukraine	A member of the family Dryinidae.	
Brachysyntexis acuta	Sp. nov	Valid	Kopylov et al.	Middle Jurassic	Daohugou Beds	China	A member of the family Anaxyelidae.	
Brachysyntexis brevicornis	Sp. nov	Valid	Kopylov et al.	Middle Jurassic	Daohugou Beds	China	A member of the family Anaxyelidae.	
Brachysyntexis laticella	Sp. nov	Valid	Kopylov et al.	Middle Jurassic	Daohugou Beds	China	A member of the family Anaxyelidae.	
Brachysyntexis minuta	Sp. nov	Valid	Kopylov et al.	Middle Jurassic	Daohugou Beds	China	A member of the family Anaxyelidae.	
Brachysyntexis rohweri	Sp. nov	Valid	Kopylov et al.	Middle Jurassic	Daohugou Beds	China	A member of the family Anaxyelidae.	
Brachysyntexis sinensis	Sp. nov	Valid	Kopylov et al.	Middle Jurassic	Daohugou Beds	China	A member of the family Anaxyelidae.	
Burmaevania	Gen. et 2 sp. nov	Valid	Shih et al.	Late Cretaceous (Cenomanian)	Burmese amber	Myanmar	A member of the family Evaniidae. Genus includes new species B. brevis and B. aequalis.	
Burmasclerogibba	Gen. et sp. nov	In press	Perkovsky et al.	Late Cretaceous (Cenomanian)	Burmese amber	Myanmar	A member of the family Sclerogibbidae. Genus includes new species B. aptera.	
Burmorussus	Fam. nov., Gen. et sp. nov	Valid	Zhang et al.	Late Cretaceous (Cenomanian)	Burmese amber	Myanmar	A parasitic wasp belonging to the new family Burmorussidae. Genus includes new species B. mirabilis.	
Burmusculus magnus	Sp. nov	Valid	Li et al.	Late Cretaceous (Cenomanian)	Burmese amber	Myanmar	A member of Apocrita belonging to the family Burmusculidae.	
Butiokeras	Gen. et sp. nov	Valid	Burks & Heraty	Eocene	Baltic amber	Russia (Kaliningrad Oblast)	A member of the family Pteromalidae belonging to the subfamily Eunotinae. The type species is B. costae.	
Camelosphecia	Gen. et 2 sp. nov	Valid	Boudinot, Perrichot & Chaul	Late Cretaceous (Cenomanian)	Burmese amber	Myanmar	A member of Formicoidea closely related to ants. The type species is C. fossor; genus also includes C. venator.	
Cataglyphoides dlusskyi	Sp. nov	Valid	Radchenko & Khomych	Eocene (Priabonian)	Rovno amber	Ukraine	An ant.	
Ceratomyrmex planus	Sp. nov	In press	Lattke & Melo	Late Cretaceous (Cenomanian)	Burmese amber	Myanmar	A haidomyrmecine ant.	
Chartocerus azizae	Sp. nov	Valid	Burks et al.	Eocene	Baltic amber	Europe (Baltic Sea region)	A member of the family Signiphoridae.	
Chonidris	Gen. et sp. nov	Valid	Perrichot, Wang & Barden	Cretaceous (Albian–Cenomanian)	Burmese amber	Myanmar	A haidomyrmecine ant. Genus includes new species C. insolita.	
Cleistepyris allosaurus	Sp. nov	Valid	Colombo, Gobbi & Azevedo in Colombo et al.	Eocene	Rovno amber	Ukraine	A member of the family Bethylidae belonging to the subfamily Pristocerinae.	
Cleistepyris baryonyx	Sp. nov	Valid	Colombo, Gobbi & Azevedo in Colombo et al.	Eocene	Baltic amber	Russia	A member of the family Bethylidae belonging to the subfamily Pristocerinae.	
Coriotela	Gen. et sp. nov	Valid	Burks & Heraty	Eocene	Baltic amber	Russia (Kaliningrad Oblast)	A member of the family Pteromalidae belonging to the subfamily Asaphesinae. The type species is C. lasallei.	
Cratosirex	Gen. et sp. nov	Valid	Jouault, Pouillon & Nel	Early Cretaceous	Crato Formation	Brazil	A horntail wasp. Genus includes new species C. sennlaubi.	
Cretapristocera	Gen. et sp. nov	Valid	Jouault et al.	Late Cretaceous (Cenomanian)	Burmese amber	Myanmar	A member of the family Bethylidae, possibly belonging to the subfamily Protopristocerinae. Genus includes new species C. longiscapa.	
Cretolixon	Gen. et sp. nov	Valid	Lohrmann in Lohrmann et al.	Cretaceous (Albian–Cenomanian)	Burmese amber	Myanmar	A member of the family Rhopalosomatidae. The type species is C. alatum.	
Cretosclerogibba	Gen. et 4 sp. nov	In press	Perkovsky et al.	Late Cretaceous (Cenomanian)	Burmese amber	Myanmar	A member of the family Sclerogibbidae. Genus includes new species C. antennalis, C. contractocollis, C. neli and C. rasnitsyni.	
Cryptocheilus leleji	Sp. nov	In press	Waichert et al.	Eocene (Ypresian)	Fur Formation	Denmark	A species of Cryptocheilus.	
Daosyntexis	Gen. et sp. nov	Valid	Kopylov et al.	Middle Jurassic	Daohugou Beds	China	A member of the family Anaxyelidae. Genus includes new species D. primus.	
Decasphex	Gen. et sp. nov	In press	Zheng et al.	Late Cretaceous (Cenomanian)	Burmese amber	Myanmar	A member of the family Angarosphecidae. Genus includes new species D. cretacicus.	
Dhagnathos	Gen. et sp. nov	Valid	Perrichot, Wang & Barden	Cretaceous (Albian–Cenomanian)	Burmese amber	Myanmar	A haidomyrmecine ant. Genus includes new species D. autokrator.	Dhagnathos autokrator
Dilobops	Gen. et sp. nov	In press	Lattke & Melo	Late Cretaceous (Cenomanian)	Burmese amber	Myanmar	A haidomyrmecine ant. Genus includes new species D. bidentata.	
Discoscapa	Fam. nov., Gen. et sp. nov	Valid	Poinar	Late Cretaceous (Cenomanian)	Burmese amber	Myanmar	A hymenopteran of uncertain phylogenetic placement. Originally described as a member of Apoidea belonging to the new family Discoscapidae, but subsequently argued to be a wasp belonging to the tribe Discoscapini within the subfamily Crabroninae. The type species is D. apicula.	
Dissomphalus schubnelli	Sp. nov	Valid	Falières & Nel	Early Eocene	Oise amber	France	A member of the family Bethylidae belonging to the subfamily Pristocerinae.	
Dryinus acutifrons	Sp. nov	Valid	Martynova et al.	Late Cretaceous (Cenomanian)	Burmese amber	Myanmar	A member of the family Dryinidae.	
Dryinus arakanesis	Sp. nov	Valid	Martynova et al.	Late Cretaceous (Cenomanian)	Burmese amber	Myanmar	A member of the family Dryinidae.	
Dryinus bamar	Sp. nov	Valid	Martynova et al.	Late Cretaceous (Cenomanian)	Burmese amber	Myanmar	A member of the family Dryinidae.	
Dryinus brachytarsis	Sp. nov	Valid	Martynova et al.	Late Cretaceous (Cenomanian)	Burmese amber	Myanmar	A member of the family Dryinidae.	
Dryinus burmensis	Sp. nov	Valid	Martynova et al.	Late Cretaceous (Cenomanian)	Burmese amber	Myanmar	A member of the family Dryinidae.	
Dryinus chin	Sp. nov	Valid	Martynova et al.	Late Cretaceous (Cenomanian)	Burmese amber	Myanmar	A member of the family Dryinidae.	
Dryinus katyae	Sp. nov	Valid	Martynova et al.	Late Cretaceous (Cenomanian)	Burmese amber	Myanmar	A member of the family Dryinidae.	
Dryinus laminatus	Sp. nov	Valid	Martynova et al.	Late Cretaceous (Cenomanian)	Burmese amber	Myanmar	A member of the family Dryinidae.	
Dryinus latitarsis	Sp. nov	Valid	Martynova et al.	Late Cretaceous (Cenomanian)	Burmese amber	Myanmar	A member of the family Dryinidae.	
Dryinus nadezhdae	Sp. nov	Valid	Martynova et al.	Late Cretaceous (Cenomanian)	Burmese amber	Myanmar	A member of the family Dryinidae.	
Dryinus parisei	Sp. nov	Valid	Martynova et al.	Late Cretaceous (Cenomanian)	Burmese amber	Myanmar	A member of the family Dryinidae.	
Dryinus taron	Sp. nov	Valid	Martynova et al.	Late Cretaceous (Cenomanian)	Burmese amber	Myanmar	A member of the family Dryinidae.	
Edrossia	Gen. et sp. nov	In press	Perkovsky et al.	Late Cretaceous (Cenomanian)	Burmese amber	Myanmar	A member of the family Sclerogibbidae. Genus includes new species E. vetusta.	
Efesus	Gen. et sp. nov	Valid	Simutnik in Simutnik, Perkovsky & Vasilenko	Late Eocene	Danish amber	Denmark	A member of the family Encyrtidae. The type species is E. trufanovi.	
Ekaterina	Gen. et sp. nov	Valid	Colombo, Gobbi & Azevedo in Colombo et al.	Late Cretaceous (Santonian)	Kheta Formation	Russia	A member of the family Bethylidae belonging to the subfamily Pristocerinae. Genus includes new species E. volgatitan.	
Ektopicercus	Gen. et sp. nov	Valid	Simutnik in Simutnik & Perkovsky	Eocene	Rovno amber	Ukraine	A member of the family Encyrtidae. Genus includes new species E. punctatus.	
Electrofoenia	Gen. et sp. nov	In press	Jouault, Nel & Perrichot	Late Cretaceous (Cenomanian)	Burmese amber	Myanmar	A member of the family Aulacidae. Genus includes new species E. jehani.	
Embolemopsis maryannae	Sp. nov	In press	Perkovsky et al.	Early Cretaceous (Barremian)	Wealden amber	United Kingdom	A member of the family Embolemidae.	
Embolemus antiquus	Sp. nov	In press	Perkovsky et al.	Late Cretaceous (Cenomanian)	Burmese amber	Myanmar	A member of the family Embolemidae.	
Embolemus burmensis	Sp. nov	In press	Perkovsky et al.	Late Cretaceous (Cenomanian)	Burmese amber	Myanmar	A member of the family Embolemidae.	
Embolemus cretacicus	Sp. nov	In press	Perkovsky et al.	Late Cretaceous (Cenomanian)	Burmese amber	Myanmar	A member of the family Embolemidae.	
Embolemus ohmkuhnlei	Sp. nov	In press	Perkovsky et al.	Late Cretaceous (Cenomanian)	Burmese amber	Myanmar	A member of the family Embolemidae.	
Embolemus zherikhini	Sp. nov	In press	Perkovsky et al.	Late Cretaceous (Cenomanian)	Burmese amber	Myanmar	A member of the family Embolemidae.	
Encyrtoides	Gen. et sp. nov	Valid	Simutnik	Middle Eocene	Sakhalinian amber	Russia	A member of the family Encyrtidae. Genus includes new species E. pronotatus.	
Eocenomyrma groehni	Sp. nov	Valid	Radchenko	Eocene (Priabonian)	Baltic amber	Europe (Baltic Sea region)	An ant belonging to the subfamily Myrmicinae.	
Eopelecinus inopinatus	Sp. nov	In press	Jouault et al.	Late Cretaceous (Cenomanian)	Burmese amber	Myanmar	A member of the family Pelecinidae.	
Eorhopalosoma lohrmanni	Sp. nov	Valid	Boudinot & Dungey	Late Cretaceous (Cenomanian)	Burmese amber	Myanmar	A member of the family Rhopalosomatidae.	
Evaniella dominicana	Sp. nov	Valid	Poinar	Miocene	Dominican amber	Dominican Republic	A species of Evaniella.	
Evaniella setifera	Sp. nov	Valid	Poinar	Miocene	Dominican amber	Dominican Republic	A species of Evaniella.	
Gallosclerogibba	Gen. et sp. nov	In press	Perkovsky et al.	Late Cretaceous (Cenomanian)	Charentese amber	France	A member of the family Sclerogibbidae. Genus includes new species G. alnensis.	
Goniomma poschmanni	Sp. nov	Valid	Jessen	Late Oligocene	Enspel Formation	Germany	An ant, a species of Goniomma.	
Haidomyrmex davidbowiei	Sp. nov	In press	Lattke & Melo	Late Cretaceous (Cenomanian)	Burmese amber	Myanmar	A haidomyrmecine ant.	
Hambletonia dominicana	Sp. nov	Valid	Poinar	Eocene or Miocene	Dominican amber	Dominican Republic	A member of the family Encyrtidae.	
Helorus arturi	Sp. nov	Valid	Muona	Eocene	Baltic amber	Europe (Baltic Sea region)	A species of Helorus.	
Hybristodryinus moutesoe	Sp. nov	In press	Tribull, Barden & Olmi	Late Cretaceous (Cenomanian)	Burmese amber	Myanmar	A member of the family Dryinidae.	
Hyptia mexicana	Sp. nov	Valid	Poinar	Miocene	Mexican amber	Mexico	A species of Hyptia.	
Kressleinius	Gen. et sp. nov	Valid	Domer & Burks in Domer et al.	Eocene	Baltic amber	Europe (Baltic Sea region)	A member of the family Eulophidae. The type species is K. celans.	
Linguamyrmex brevicornis	Sp. nov	Valid	Perrichot, Wang & Barden	Cretaceous (Albian–Cenomanian)	Burmese amber	Myanmar	A haidomyrmecine ant.	Linguamyrmex brevicornis
Madygella humioi	Sp. nov	Valid	Oyama & Maeda	Late Triassic	Mine Group	Japan	A member of the family Xyelidae.	
Magnaxyela	Gen. et sp. nov	Valid	Zheng et al.	Middle Jurassic	Jiulongshan Formation	China	A member of the family Xyelidae. Genus includes new species M. rara.	
Megalopsenella	Gen. et sp. nov	Valid	Jouault et al.	Late Cretaceous (Cenomanian)	Burmese amber	Myanmar	A member of the family Bethylidae belonging to the subfamily Holopsenellinae. Genus includes new species M. pouilloni.	
Myanmarina sidorchukae	Sp. nov	In press	Jouault, Rasnitsyn & Perrichot	Late Cretaceous (Cenomanian)	Burmese amber	Myanmar	A member of Stephanoidea belonging to the family Myanmarinidae.	
Myanmephialtites	Gen. et sp. nov	In press	Jouault, Rasnitsyn & Perrichot	Late Cretaceous (Cenomanian)	Burmese amber	Myanmar	A stephanoid wasp, in the new family Ohlhoffiidae. Genus includes new species M. bashkuevi.	
Myrmica nungesseri	Sp. nov	Valid	Jessen	Late Oligocene	Enspel Formation	Germany	An ant, a species of Myrmica.	
Myrmica schaefersi	Sp. nov	Valid	Jessen	Late Oligocene	Enspel Formation	Germany	An ant, a species of Myrmica.	
Myrmicium araripterum	Sp. nov	Valid	Freitas et al.	Early Cretaceous (Aptian)	Crato Formation	Brazil	A member of Siricoidea belonging to the family Pseudosiricidae.	
Nadezhdabythus	Gen. et sp. nov	Valid	Zhang et al.	Late Cretaceous (Cenomanian)	Burmese amber	Myanmar	A member of the family Scolebythidae. Genus includes new species N. burmensis.	
Newjersevania rasnitsyni	Sp. nov	Valid	Shih et al.	Late Cretaceous (Cenomanian)	Burmese amber	Myanmar	A member of the family Evaniidae.	
Ohlhoffia	Fam. nov., Gen. et sp. nov	In press	Jouault, Rasnitsyn & Perrichot	Late Cretaceous (Cenomanian)	Burmese amber	Myanmar	A stephanoid wasp, in the new family Ohlhoffiidae. Genus includes new species O. robusta.	
Palaeoanteon cenomanianum	Sp. nov	In press	Perkovsky et al.	Late Cretaceous (Cenomanian)	Burmese amber	Myanmar	A member of the family Dryinidae belonging to the subfamily Palaeoanteoninae.	
Pangu	Fam. nov., Gen. et 2 sp. nov	Valid	Li et al.	Late Cretaceous (Cenomanian)	Burmese amber	Myanmar	A member of Apocrita belonging to the new family Panguidae. Genus includes new species P. yuangu and P. antiquum.	
Paraphaenogaster bizeri	Sp. nov	Valid	Jessen	Late Oligocene	Enspel Formation	Germany	An ant belonging to the subfamily Myrmicinae.	
Paraphaenogaster freihauti	Sp. nov	Valid	Jessen	Late Oligocene	Enspel Formation	Germany	An ant belonging to the subfamily Myrmicinae.	
Paraphaenogaster loosi	Sp. nov	Valid	Jessen	Late Oligocene	Enspel Formation	Germany	An ant belonging to the subfamily Myrmicinae.	
Paraphaenogaster schindleri	Sp. nov	Valid	Jessen	Late Oligocene	Enspel Formation	Germany	An ant belonging to the subfamily Myrmicinae.	
Paraphaenogaster wettlauferi	Sp. nov	Valid	Jessen	Late Oligocene	Enspel Formation	Germany	An ant belonging to the subfamily Myrmicinae.	
Paraphaenogaster wuttkei	Sp. nov	Valid	Jessen	Late Oligocene	Enspel Formation	Germany	An ant belonging to the subfamily Myrmicinae.	
Plumalexius ohmkuhnlei	Sp. nov	In press	Rasnitsyn & Brothers	Late Cretaceous (Cenomanian)	Burmese amber	Myanmar	A species of Plumalexius.	
Ponomarenkoa burmensis	Sp. nov	In press	Perkovsky et al.	Late Cretaceous (Cenomanian)	Burmese amber	Myanmar	A member of the family Embolemidae.	
Prionomyrmex gusakovi	Sp. nov	Valid	Radchenko & Perkovsky	Late Eocene	Baltic amber	Europe (Baltic Sea region)	An ant.	
Proapocritus lini	Sp. nov	Valid	Zhang	Middle-Late Jurassic	Daohugou Beds	China	A member of Apocrita belonging to the family Ephialtitidae.	
Protaneuretus mirabilis	Sp. nov	Valid	Dubovikoff et al.	Late Eocene	Bitterfeld amber	Germany	An ant.	
Protobelyta	Gen. et sp. nov	In press	Jouault, Perrichot & Nel	Cretaceous (Albian–Cenomanian)	Burmese amber	Myanmar	A member of the family Diapriidae belonging to the subfamily Belytinae. Genus includes new species P. monsirei.	
Protobracon	Gen. et sp. nov	In press	Chen et al.	Late Cretaceous (Cenomanian)	Burmese amber	Myanmar	A member of the family Braconidae. Genus includes new species P. robusticauda.	
Protoceratomyrmex	Gen. et sp. nov	Valid	Perrichot, Wang & Barden	Cretaceous (Albian–Cenomanian)	Burmese amber	Myanmar	A haidomyrmecine ant. Genus includes new species P. revelatus.	
Protozigrasimecia	Gen. et sp. nov	Valid	Cao, Boudinot & Gao in Cao et al.	Late Cretaceous (Cenomanian)	Burmese amber	Myanmar	An ant belonging to the subfamily Sphecomyrminae and the tribe Zigrasimeciini. The type species is P. chauli.	
Pseudisobrachium megalosaurus	Sp. nov	Valid	Colombo, Gobbi & Azevedo in Colombo et al.	Eocene	Rovno amber	Ukraine	A species of Pseudisobrachium.	
Pseudisobrachium stegosaurus	Sp. nov	Valid	Colombo, Gobbi & Azevedo in Colombo et al.	Eocene	Rovno amber	Ukraine	A species of Pseudisobrachium.	
Pyramidibracon	Gen. et sp. nov	In press	Chen et al.	Late Cretaceous (Cenomanian)	Burmese amber	Myanmar	A member of the family Braconidae. Genus includes new species P. clypeatus.	
Raptodryinus	Gen. et sp. nov	In press	Olmi et al.	Late Cretaceous (Cenomanian)	Burmese amber	Myanmar	A member of the family Dryinidae. Genus includes new species R. patrickmuelleri.	
Rasnitsevania	Gen. et sp. nov	In press	Jouault, Nel & Perrichot	Late Cretaceous (Cenomanian)	Burmese amber	Myanmar	A member of Evanioidea belonging the family Praeaulacidae. Genus includes new species R. ferox.	
Sclerostigma	Gen. et sp. nov	Valid	Kopylov & Rasnitsyn in Kopylov et al.	Early Cretaceous		Russia	A member of the family Anaxyelidae. The type species is S. trimaculata.	
Sclerosyntexis	Gen. et sp. nov	Valid	Wang et al.	Late Cretaceous (Cenomanian)	Burmese amber	Myanmar	A member of the family Anaxyelidae. Genus includes new species S. hirsuta.	
Semaeomyia hispaniola	Sp. nov	Valid	Poinar	Miocene	Dominican amber	Dominican Republic	A member of the family Evaniidae.	
Siccibythus martynovae	Sp. nov	Valid	Rasnitsyn et al.	Late Cretaceous (Cenomanian)	Burmese amber	Myanmar	A member of the family Falsiformicidae.	
Siccibythus oculatus	Sp. nov	Valid	Rasnitsyn et al.	Late Cretaceous (Cenomanian)	Burmese amber	Myanmar	A member of the family Falsiformicidae.	
Siccibythus ohmkuhnlei	Sp. nov	Valid	Rasnitsyn et al.	Late Cretaceous (Cenomanian)	Burmese amber	Myanmar	A member of the family Falsiformicidae.	
Siccibythus pallidus	Sp. nov	Valid	Rasnitsyn et al.	Late Cretaceous (Cenomanian)	Burmese amber	Myanmar	A member of the family Falsiformicidae.	
Siccibythus paulus	Sp. nov	Valid	Rasnitsyn et al.	Late Cretaceous (Cenomanian)	Burmese amber	Myanmar	A member of the family Falsiformicidae.	
Supraserphites margritae	Sp. nov	Valid	Rasnitsyn & Öhm-Kühnle	Late Cretaceous (Cenomanian)	Burmese amber	Myanmar	A member of the family Serphitidae.	
Supraserphites vorontsovi	Sp. nov	Valid	Rasnitsyn & Öhm-Kühnle	Late Cretaceous (Cenomanian)	Burmese amber	Myanmar	A member of the family Serphitidae.	
Thaumatodryinus fuscescens	Sp. nov	Valid	Martins & Melo	Miocene (Burdigalian)	Dominican amber	Dominican Republic	A member of the family Dryinidae.	
Tibialobracon	Gen. et sp. nov	In press	Chen et al.	Late Cretaceous (Cenomanian)	Burmese amber	Myanmar	A member of the family Braconidae. Genus includes new species T. compressicornis.	
Uniceratops	Gen. et sp. nov	Valid	Colombo, Gobbi & Azevedo in Colombo et al.	Late Cretaceous (Cenomanian)	Burmese amber	Myanmar	A member of the family Bethylidae belonging to the subfamily Pristocerinae. Genus includes new species U. trex.	
Zigrasimecia hoelldobleri	Sp. nov	Valid	Cao, Boudinot & Gao in Cao et al.	Late Cretaceous (Cenomanian)	Burmese amber	Myanmar	An ant belonging to the subfamily Sphecomyrminae and the tribe Zigrasimeciini.	Zigrasimecia hoelldobleri

=== Hymenopteran research ===
- 100-million-year-old sweat bee nests, representing the oldest evidence of crown bees reported so far, (Cellicalichnus) are described from the Castillo Formation (Argentina) by Genise et al. (2020).
- A single worker of Ceratomyrmex ellenbergeri preserved restraining a Caputoraptor elegans nymph is described from the Cretaceous Burmese amber by Barden, Perrichot & Wang (2020), who argue that the aberrant morphology of fossil haidomyrmecine "hell ants" (scythe-like mouthparts and horn-like cephalic projections) was an adaptation for prey capture.
- Evidence of polymorphism within worker caste of ants belonging to the species Zigrasimecia ferox is presented by Cao et al. (2020).
- A study comparing the relative lengths of legs of ants from Baltic amber (Formica flori and members of the genus Cataglyphoides) and extant ants belonging to the genera Cataglyphis and Formica will be published by Wehner, Rabenstein & Habersetzer (2020), who report that the Cataglyphoides data are fully in accord with the Cataglyphis pattern of the leg-to-body length relationships, and discuss evolutionary implications of their findings.

== Clade Neuropterida ==
=== Megalopterans ===
Name	Novelty	Status	Authors	Age	Type locality	Country	Notes	Images
Nigronia prussia	Sp. nov	Valid	Liu & Ansorge	Eocene	Baltic amber	Europe (Baltic Sea region)	A corydalid fishfly.	

=== Neuropterans ===
Name	Novelty	Status	Authors	Age	Type locality	Country	Notes	Images
Acanthoberotha	Gen. et sp. nov	Valid	Nakamine, Yamamoto & Takahashi	Late Cretaceous (Cenomanian)	Burmese amber	Myanmar	A member of the family Rhachiberothidae. Genus includes new species A. cuspis.	
Acanthomantispa	Gen. et 3 sp. nov	Valid	Lu et al.	Late Cretaceous (Cenomanian)	Burmese amber	Myanmar	A member of the family Mantispidae belonging to the subfamily Drepanicinae. The type species is A. immaculata; genus also includes A. grandis and A. maculata.	
Aetheogramma glycophila	Sp. nov	Valid	Khramov & Chen	Early Cretaceous	Yixian Formation	China	A member of the family Aetheogrammatidae.	
Astioberotha	Gen. et sp. nov	Valid	Nakamine, Yamamoto & Takahashi	Late Cretaceous (Cenomanian)	Burmese amber	Myanmar	A member of the family Rhachiberothidae. Genus includes new species A. falcipes.	
Cantabroberotha	Gen. et sp. nov	In press	Pérez-de la Fuente, Peñalver & Engel	Early Cretaceous (Albian)		Spain	A member of the family Berothidae. Genus includes new species C. soplaensis.	
Cornoberotha	Gen. et 3 sp. nov	Valid	Yang et al.	Late Cretaceous (Cenomanian)	Burmese amber	Myanmar	A member of the family Berothidae. Genus includes new species C. anomala, C. aspoeckae and C. monogona.	
Cratocroce	Gen. et sp. nov	Valid	Nel & Pella	Early Cretaceous	Crato Formation	Brazil	A member of the family Nemopteridae. Genus includes new species C. araripensis.	
Cratoneura cuneata	Sp. nov	Valid	Yang et al.	Late Cretaceous (Cenomanian)	Burmese amber	Myanmar	A member of the family Araripeneuridae.	
Creagroparaberotha cuneata	Sp. nov	Valid	Nakamine, Yamamoto & Takahashi	Late Cretaceous (Cenomanian)	Burmese amber	Myanmar	A member of the family Rhachiberothidae.	
Dicranomantispa	Gen. et sp. nov	Valid	Lu et al.	Late Cretaceous (Cenomanian)	Burmese amber	Myanmar	A member of the family Mantispidae belonging to the subfamily Drepanicinae. The type species is D. zhouae.	
Dolichoberotha	Gen. et 2 sp. nov	Valid	Yang et al.	Late Cretaceous (Cenomanian)	Burmese amber	Myanmar	A member of the family Berothidae. Genus includes new species D. burmana, and D. bifurcata.	
Doratomantispa ares	Sp. nov	Valid	Lu et al.	Late Cretaceous (Cenomanian)	Burmese amber	Myanmar	A member of the family Mantispidae belonging to the subfamily Doratomantispinae.	
Doratomantispa pubescens	Sp. nov	Valid	Lu et al.	Late Cretaceous (Cenomanian)	Burmese amber	Myanmar	A member of the family Mantispidae belonging to the subfamily Doratomantispinae.	
Dzhidosmylus	Gen. et sp. nov	Valid	Khramov in Kopylov et al.	Early Cretaceous		Russia	A member of the family Osmylidae. The type species is D. solus.	
Enigmadipteromantispa	Gen. et sp. nov	Valid	Azar, Maksoud & Huang	Late Cretaceous (Cenomanian)	Burmese amber	Myanmar	A member of the family Dipteromantispidae. Genus includes new species E. dimyi.	
Epinesydrion	Gen. et sp. nov	Valid	Archibald & Makarkin	Eocene (Ypresian)		Canada	A member of the family Nymphidae. Genus includes new species E. falklandensis.	
Haplosymphrasites	Gen. et sp. nov	Valid	Lu et al.	Late Cretaceous (Cenomanian)	Burmese amber	Myanmar	A member of the family Mantispidae belonging to the subfamily Symphrasinae. The type species is H. zouae.	
Hemeroberotha	Gen. et sp. nov	Valid	Makarkin & Gröhn	Late Cretaceous (Cenomanian)	Burmese amber	Myanmar	A member of the family Hemerobiidae. Genus includes new species H. sinefurca.	
Jurakempynus loculosus	Sp. nov	Valid	Ma et al.	Middle Jurassic	Jiulongshan	China	A member of the family Osmylidae belonging to the subfamily Kempyninae.	
Khasurtoberotha	Gen. et sp. nov	Valid	Khramov in Kopylov et al.	Early Cretaceous		Russia	A member of the family Berothidae. The type species is K. bellissima.	
Kurtodipteromantispa	Gen. et 2 sp. nov	Valid	Li & Liu	Late Cretaceous (Cenomanian)	Burmese amber	Myanmar	A member of the family Dipteromantispidae. Genus includes new species K. zhuodei Li & Liu and K. xiai Li et al..	
Lichenipolystoechotes	Gen. et 2 sp. nov	Valid	Fang, Zheng & Wang in Fang et al.	Jurassic (Callovian–Oxfordian boundary interval)	Jiulongshan Formation	China	A member of the family Ithonidae. The type species is L. angustimaculatus Fang, Zheng & Wang; genus also includes L. ramimaculatus Fang, Ma & Wang.	
Lonchomantispa	Gen. et sp. nov	Disputed	Shi, Yang & Ren in Shi et al.	Late Cretaceous (Cenomanian)	Burmese amber	Myanmar	A member of the family Mantispidae. The type species is L. longa. Li et al. (2022) synonymized Lonchomantispa with the genus Doratomantispa, though the authors maintained L. longa as a distinct species within the latter genus.	
Makarkinia irmae	Sp. nov	In press	Machado, Freitas & Ribeiro	Early Cretaceous	Crato Formation	Brazil	A member of the family Kalligrammatidae.	Makarkinia irmae
Mesypochrysa binervis	Sp. nov	Valid	Zhang et al.	Early Cretaceous		China	A member of the family Chrysopidae.	
Mesypochrysa pusilla	Sp. nov	Valid	Zhang et al.	Early Cretaceous		China	A member of the family Chrysopidae.	
Micromantispa galeata	Sp. nov	Valid	Nakamine, Yamamoto & Takahashi	Late Cretaceous (Cenomanian)	Burmese amber	Myanmar	A member of the family Rhachiberothidae.	
Micromantispa spicata	Sp. nov	Valid	Nakamine, Yamamoto & Takahashi	Late Cretaceous (Cenomanian)	Burmese amber	Myanmar	A member of the family Rhachiberothidae.	
Mirokempynus	Gen. et sp. nov	Valid	Ma et al.	Middle Jurassic	Jiulongshan	China	A member of the family Osmylidae belonging to the subfamily Kempyninae. Genus includes new species M. profundobifurcus.	
Ophtalmogramma	Gen. et sp. nov	Valid	Ansorge & Makarkin	Early Jurassic (Toarcian)		Germany	A member of the family Kalligrammatidae. Genus includes new species O. klopschari. Announced in 2020; the final version of the article naming it was published in 2021.	
Osmylochrysa navasia	Sp. nov	Valid	Khramov in Kopylov et al.	Early Cretaceous		Russia	A member of the family Osmylidae.	
Parababinskaia douteaui	Sp. nov	Valid	Ngô-Muller et al.	Late Cretaceous (Cenomanian)	Burmese amber	Myanmar	A member of Myrmeleontoidea belonging to the family Babinskaiidae.	
Paradipteromantispa	Gen. et sp. nov	Valid	Li et al.	Late Cretaceous (Cenomanian)	Burmese amber	Myanmar	A member of the family Dipteromantispidae. Genus includes new species P. polyneura.	
Paradoxomantispa	Gen. et sp. nov	Valid	Lu et al.	Late Cretaceous (Cenomanian)	Burmese amber	Myanmar	A member of the family Mantispidae belonging to the subfamily Doratomantispinae. The type species is P. jiaxiaoae.	
Parasymphrasites	Gen. et sp. nov	Valid	Lu et al.	Late Cretaceous (Cenomanian)	Burmese amber	Myanmar	A member of the family Mantispidae belonging to the subfamily Symphrasinae. The type species is P. electrinus.	
Pectispina	Gen. et sp. nov	Valid	Shi, Yang & Ren in Shi et al.	Late Cretaceous (Cenomanian)	Burmese amber	Myanmar	A member of the family Mantispidae. The type species is P. libera.	
Proneuronema sidorchukae	Sp. nov	Valid	Makarkin & Perkovsky	Late Eocene	Rovno amber	Ukraine	A Hemerobiid brown lacewing.	
Protochrysa brevinervis	Sp. nov	Valid	Zhang et al.	Early Cretaceous	Yixian Formation	China	A member of the family Chrysopidae. Originally described as a species of Protochrysa, but subsequently transferred to the genus Mesypochrysa by Makarkin, Simonsen & Perkovsky (2025).	
Psilomantispa	Gen. et sp. nov	Valid	Lu et al.	Late Cretaceous (Cenomanian)	Burmese amber	Myanmar	A drepanicine mantisfly. The type species is P. abnormis.	
Stygioberotha	Gen. et sp. nov	Valid	Nakamine, Yamamoto & Takahashi	Late Cretaceous (Cenomanian)	Burmese amber	Myanmar	A member of the family Rhachiberothidae. Genus includes new species S. siculifera.	Stygioberotha siculifera
Sympherobius irinae	Sp. nov	Valid	Perkovsky & Makarkin	Eocene	Rovno amber	Ukraine	A species of Sympherobius.	
Tachinymphes koraiensis	Sp. nov	Valid	Khramov & Nam	Early Cretaceous	Jinju Formation	South Korea	A member of the family Mesochrysopidae.	
Uranoberotha	Gen. et sp. nov	Valid	Nakamine, Yamamoto & Takahashi	Late Cretaceous (Cenomanian)	Burmese amber	Myanmar	A member of the family Rhachiberothidae. Genus includes new species U. chariessa.	Uranoberotha chariessa
Vetosmylus	Gen. et 2 sp. nov	Valid	Ma et al.	Middle Jurassic (Aalenian–Bajocian boundary)	Jiulongshan Formation	China	A member of the family Osmylidae. The type species is V. tentus; genus also includes V. maculosus.	
Zakamnosmylus	Gen. et sp. nov	Valid	Khramov in Kopylov et al.	Early Cretaceous		Russia	A member of the family Osmylidae. The type species is Z. elongatus.	

==== Neuropteran research ====
- Three neuropteran larvae with straight mandibulomaxillary stylets, representing some of the oldest straight-jawed neuropteran larvae reported so far, are described from the Aptian amber from Spain by Pérez-de la Fuente et al. (2020).
- New type of a lacewing larva, with a prominent forward projecting labrum and curved venom-injecting stylets formed by mandibles and maxillae, is described from the Cretaceous Burmese amber by Haug et al. (2020).

=== Raphidioptera ===
Name	Novelty	Status	Authors	Age	Type locality	Country	Notes	Images
Allobaissoptera	Gen. et sp. nov	Valid	Lu et al.	Cretaceous; Cenomanian	Burmese amber	Myanmar	A Baissopteridaen snakefly. The type species is A. oligophlebia.	
Allocotoraphidia	Gen. et comb. nov	In press	Lyu et al.	Early Cretaceous	Yixian Formation	China	A Mesoraphidiidaen snakefly. The type species is Mesoraphidia myrioneura 1997.	
Baissoptera burmana	Sp. nov	Valid	Lu et al.	Cretaceous; Cenomanian	Burmese amber	Myanmar	A baissopterid snakefly.	
Baissoptera maculata	Sp. nov	Valid	Lu et al.	Cretaceous; Cenomanian	Burmese amber	Myanmar	A baissopterid snakefly.	
Baissoptera monopoda	Sp. nov	Valid	Lu et al.	Cretaceous; Cenomanian	Burmese amber	Myanmar	A baissopterid snakefly.	
Baissoptera pankowskiorum	Sp. nov	Valid	Lu et al.	Cretaceous; Cenomanian	Burmese amber	Myanmar	A baissopterid snakefly.	
Baissoptera wangi	Sp. nov	Valid	Lu et al.	Cretaceous; Cenomanian	Burmese amber	Myanmar	A baissopterid snakefly.	
Beipiaoraphidia	Gen. et sp. nov	In press	Lyu et al.	Early Cretaceous	Yixian Formation	China	A mesoraphidiid snakefly. The type species is B. martynovi.	
Burmobiassoptera	Gen. et sp. nov	Valid	Lu et al.	Cretaceous; Cenomanian	Burmese amber	Myanmar	A baissopterid snakefly. The type species is B. jiaxiaoae.	
Cretohondelagia	Gen. et sp. nov	Valid	Khramov	Early Cretaceous		Russia	A Priscaenigmatidae basal snakeflies). The type species is C. viridis.	
Electrobaissoptera	Gen. et sp. nov	Valid	Lu et al.	Cretaceous; Cenomanian	Burmese amber	Myanmar	A baissopterid snakefly. The type species is E. burmanica.	
Grammoraphidia	Gen. et sp. nov	In press	Lyu et al.	Early Cretaceous	Yixian Formation	China	A mesoraphidiid snakefly. The type species is G. ponomarenkoi.	
Proraphidia jepsoni	Sp. nov	In press	Lyu et al.	Early Cretaceous	Yixian Formation	China	A mesoraphidiid snakefly.	
Proraphidia yixianensis	Sp. nov	In press	Lyu et al.	Early Cretaceous	Yixian Formation	China	A mesoraphidiid snakefly.	
Rhynchobaissoptera	Gen. et sp. nov	Valid	Lu et al.	Cretaceous; Cenomanian	Burmese amber	Myanmar	A baissopterid snakefly. The type species is R. hui.	
Stenobaissoptera	Gen. et sp. nov	Valid	Lu et al.	Cretaceous; Cenomanian	Burmese amber	Myanmar	A baissopterid snakefly. The type species is S. xiai.	
Styporaphidia willmanni	Sp. nov	In press	Lyu et al.	Early Cretaceous	Yixian Formation	China	A mesoraphidiid snakefly.	
Sukachevia	Gen. et sp. nov	Valid	Khramov	Late Jurassic		Kazakhstan	A priscaenigmatid snakefly. The type species is S. pulchra.	
Yixianoraphidia	Gen. et comb. nov	In press	Lyu et al.	Early Cretaceous	Yixian Formation	China	A Mesoraphidiid snakefly. The type species is Alloraphidia anomala 1997.	

==== Raphidiopteran research ====
- A snakefly larva with a very prominent, leg-sized antenna is described from the Cretaceous Burmese amber by Haug, Müller & Haug (2020), who discuss the implications of this specimen for the knowledge of the early evolution and diversification of snakeflies.

== Clade †Palaeodictyopteroidea ==
=== †Megasecoptera ===
Name	Novelty	Status	Authors	Age	Type locality	Country	Notes	Images
Aspidothorax permianus	Sp. nov	Valid	Sinitshenkova & Aristov in Sinitshenkova, Ponomareva & Aristov	Permian		Russia	An aspidothoracidaen Megasecopteran.	
Piesbergbrodia	Gen. et comb. nov	Valid	Pecharová, Sinitshenkova, & Prokop	Late Carboniferous		Germany	A Megasecopteran; The type species is "Aspidothorax" tristrata.	
Sylvohymen marginatus	Sp. nov	Valid	Pecharová, Sinitshenkova, & Prokop	Early Permian		Russia	A member of Megasecoptera.	

=== †Palaeodictyoptera ===
Name	Novelty	Status	Authors	Age	Type locality	Country	Notes	Images
Baeoneura desperata	Sp. nov	Valid	Sinitshenkova	Early Permian		Russia	A Spilapteridae Palaeodictyopteran.	
Homaloneura brauckmanni	Sp. nov	Valid	Sinitshenkova	Early Permian		Russia	A Spilapteridae Palaeodictyopteran.	

=== Other palaeodictyopteroids ===
Name	Novelty	Status	Authors	Age	Type locality	Country	Notes	Images
Avionbrodia	Gen. et sp. nov	Valid	Schubnel et al.	Late Carboniferous		France	A member of Palaeodictyopterida, possibly belonging to the group Diaphanopterodea. Genus includes new species A. incompleta.	
Sinodiapha	Gen. et sp. nov	Valid	Yang, Ren & Béthoux	Carboniferous (early Pennsylvanian)		China	An insect with similarities to Diaphanopterodea and Megasecoptera. The type species is S. ramosa.	

== Clade Palaeoptera ==
=== Ephemeropterans ===
Name	Novelty	Status	Authors	Age	Type locality	Country	Notes	Images
Incogemina	Gen. et sp. nov	Valid	Storari et al.	Early Cretaceous (Aptian)	Crato Formation	Brazil	A mayfly belonging to the family Oligoneuriidae. The type species is I. nubila.	
Teloganella gurhaensis	Sp. nov	Valid	Agnihotri et al.	Late Paleocene-early Eocene	Palana Formation	India	A mayfly.	

=== Odonatoptera ===
Name	Novelty	Status	Authors	Age	Type locality	Country	Notes	Images
Arcanodraco	Gen. et sp. nov	Valid	Schädel, Müller & Haug	Late Cretaceous (Cenomanian)	Burmese amber	Myanmar	A member of Odonatoptera of uncertain phylogenetic placement or a member of the direct stem lineage of Odonatoptera. The type species is A. filicauda.	
Araripelibellula sennlaubi	Sp. nov	In press	Nel & Pouillon	Early Cretaceous (Aptian)	Crato Formation	Brazil	A dragonfly belonging to the family Araripelibellulidae.	
Azarphlebia	Gen. et sp. nov	Valid	Nel & Huang	Middle Jurassic		China	A damsel-dragonfly belonging to the family Campterophlebiidae. Genus includes new species A. evanescens.	
Burmagrion azari	Sp. nov	Valid	Huang, Nel & Ngô-Muller	Late Cretaceous (Cenomanian)	Burmese amber	Myanmar	A damselfly belonging to the family Burmacoenagrionidae.	
Carlea	Gen. et sp. nov	Valid	Bechly et al.	Eocene		United States	A damselfly. Genus includes new species C. eocenica.	
Cratoliupanshania	Gen. et sp. nov	In press	Pella & Nel	Early Cretaceous	Crato Formation	Brazil	A dragonfly belonging to the family Liupanshaniidae. Genus includes new species C. magnifica .	
Dysagrion integrum	Sp. nov	Valid	Bechly et al.	Eocene		United States	A damselfly.	
Enigmalestes	Fam. nov., Gen. et sp. nov	Valid	Nel & Huang	Middle–Late Jurassic		China	A damsel-dragonfly in the new family Enigmalestidae. Genus includes new species E. lini.	
Eodysphaea	Gen. et sp. nov	Valid	Bechly et al.	Eocene		United States	A damselfly. Genus includes new species E. magnifica.	
Epiaeschna wisseri	Sp. nov	Valid	Nel, Poschmann & Wedmann	Late Oligocene		Germany	A species of Epiaeschna.	
Hypsothemis sinensis	Sp. nov	Valid	Huang, Fu & Nel	Late Jurassic	Haifanggou Formation	China	A damsel-dragonfly belonging to the family Campterophlebiidae.	
Ictinogomphus engelorum	Sp. nov	Valid	Nel, Poschmann & Wedmann	Late Oligocene		Germany	A species of Ictinogomphus.	
Kachinhemiphlebia	Gen. et sp. nov	In press	Zheng	Late Cretaceous (Cenomanian)	Burmese amber	Myanmar	A damselfly belonging to the family Hemiphlebiidae. Genus includes new species K. lini.	
Kennedya tyulkinensis	Sp. nov	Valid	Felker	Permian		Russia	A member of Protozygoptera belonging to the family Kennedyidae.	
Kohlslibellula	Gen. et sp. nov	Valid	Nel	Eocene	Green River Formation	United States	A dragonfly belonging to the family Urolibellulidae. Genus includes new species K. lini.	
Labandeiraia browni	Sp. nov	Valid	Bechly et al.	Eocene		United States	A damselfly.	
Labandeiraia riveri	Sp. nov	Valid	Bechly et al.	Eocene		United States	A damselfly.	
Librelula	Gen. et sp. nov	Valid	Petrulevičius	Late Paleocene	Maíz Gordo Formation	Argentina	A damselfly belonging to the family Argiolestidae. The type species is L. maradoniana.	Librelula maradoniana
Mesophlebia elegans	Sp. nov	Valid	Tierney et al.	Triassic	Molteno Formation	South Africa	A member of the stem group of Odonata.	
Oligolestes stoeffelensis	Sp. nov	Valid	Nel, Poschmann & Wedmann	Late Oligocene		Germany	A member of the stem group of the family Sieblosiidae.	
Oreodysagrion	Gen. et sp. nov	Valid	Bechly et al.	Eocene		United States	A damselfly. Genus includes new species O. tenebris.	
Pouillonphlebia	Gen. et sp. nov	Valid	Ngô-Muller, Garrouste & Nel	Late Cretaceous (Cenomanian)	Burmese amber	Myanmar	A damsel-dragonfly belonging to the family Burmaphlebiidae. Genus includes new species P. burmitica.	
Primumaeshna	Fam. nov., Gen. et sp. nov	In press	Pouillon & Nel	Early Cretaceous	Crato Formation	Brazil	A hawker dragonfly belonging to the new family Primumaeshnidae. Genus includes new species P. britta.	
Progoneura kityakensis	Sp. nov	Valid	Felker	Permian		Russia	A member of Protozygoptera belonging to the family Kennedyidae.	
Progophlebia	Gen. et sp. nov	Valid	Felker	Permian		Russia	A member of Protozygoptera belonging to the family Kennedyidae. Genus includes new species P. tarasenkovae.	
Tenebragrion	Gen. et sp. nov	Valid	Bechly et al.	Eocene		United States	A damselfly. Genus includes new species T. shermani.	
Tynskysagrion	Gen. et sp. nov	Valid	Bechly et al.	Eocene		United States	A damselfly. Genus includes new species T. brookeae.	
Valdiphlebia	Gen. et sp. nov	Valid	Nel & Pouillon	Early Cretaceous	Crato Formation	Brazil	An Araripephlebiidae dragonfly. The type species is V. sennlaubi.	
Wolfgangeuphaea	Gen. et sp. nov		Nel in Ferwer & Nel	Eocene	Baltic amber	Europe (Baltic Sea region)	A Euphaeidae damselfly. The type species is W. ferweri.	
Zacallites cockerelli	Sp. nov	Valid	Bechly et al.	Eocene		United States	A damselfly.	

== Clade †Paoliidea ==
=== †Paoliida ===
Name	Novelty	Status	Authors	Age	Type locality	Country	Notes	Images
Permomertovia	Gen. et sp. nov	Valid	Poschmann & Nel	Early Permian	Saar–Nahe Basin	Germany	A member of Paoliida. Genus includes new species P. simpliciradius. Nel & Poschmann (2021) considered the genus Permotermovia to be a junior synonym of the genus Permula, though the authors maintained P. simpliciradius as a distinct species within the latter genus.	

== Clade Paraneoptera ==
=== Hemipterans ===
Name	Novelty	Status	Authors	Age	Type locality	Country	Notes	Images
Achiderbe	Gen. et sp. nov	Valid	Emeljanov & Shcherbakov	Cretaceous (Albian–Cenomanian)	Burmese amber	Myanmar	A member of the family Derbidae. The type species is A. obrienae.	
Allocephalocoris	Gen. et sp. nov	Valid	Luo, Baňař & Xie	Late Cretaceous (Cenomanian)	Burmese amber	Myanmar	A member of the family Enicocephalidae. Genus includes new species A. zhengi.	
Alloeopterus	Gen. et sp. nov	Valid	Poinar & Brown	Late Cretaceous (Cenomanian)	Burmese amber	Myanmar	A member of Sternorrhyncha belonging to the family Dinglidae. Genus includes new species A. anomeotarsus.	
Amberderaeous	Gen. et sp. nov	Valid	Kim et al.	Miocene	Dominican amber	Dominican Republic	A member of the family Miridae belonging to the subfamily Deraeocorinae. Genus includes new species A. gigophthalmus.	
Amecephala	Gen. et sp. nov	Valid	Drohojowska et al.	Late Cretaceous (Cenomanian)	Burmese amber	Myanmar	A member of Psylloidea belonging to the family Liadopsyllidae. The type species is A. pusilla.	
Angustipsyllidium	Gen. et sp. nov	In press	Hakim et al.	Late Cretaceous (Cenomanian)	Burmese amber	Myanmar	A member of Sternorrhyncha belonging to the group Protopsyllidioidea and to the new family Paraprotopsyllidiidae. Genus includes new species A. minutum.	
Araripenepa	Gen. et sp. nov	Valid	Nel & Pella	Early Cretaceous	Crato Formation	Brazil	A member of the family Nepidae. Genus includes new species A. vetussiphonis.	
Ayaimatum	Gen. et 2 sp. nov	Valid	Jiang et al.	Late Cretaceous (Cenomanian)	Burmese amber	Myanmar	A planthopper belonging to the family Mimarachnidae. Genus includes new species A. trilobatum Jiang et al. (2020) and A. minutum Fu & Huang (2020).	
Bathymyza	Gen. et sp. nov	Valid	Emeljanov & Shcherbakov	Eocene	Bitterfeld amber	Germany	A member of the family Dictyopharidae. The type species is B. longirostris.	
Bersta	Fam. nov., Gen. et 2 sp. nov		Tihelka et al.	Cretaceous (Albian/Cenomanian)	Burmese amber	Myanmar	A member of Cimicomorpha belonging to the new family Berstidae. The type species is B. vampirica; genus also includes B. coleopteromorpha.	Bersta coleopteromorpha (left) and Bersta vampirica (right)
Boreocixius tongchuanensis	Sp. nov	Valid	Zhang et al.	Middle Triassic (Ladinian)		China	A planthopper belonging to the family Surijokocixiidae. Announced in 2020; the final version of the article naming it was published in 2021.	
Burmapsyllidium	Gen. et sp. nov	In press	Hakim et al.	Late Cretaceous (Cenomanian)	Burmese amber	Myanmar	A member of Sternorrhyncha belonging to the group Protopsyllidioidea and to the new family Paraprotopsyllidiidae. Genus includes new species B. setosum.	
Burmissus latimaculatus	Sp. nov	Valid	Fu & Huang	Late Cretaceous (Cenomanian)	Burmese amber	Myanmar	A planthopper belonging to the family Mimarachnidae.	
Burmissus szwedoi	Sp. nov	Valid	Luo et al.	Late Cretaceous (Cenomanian)	Burmese amber	Myanmar	A planthopper belonging to the family Mimarachnidae.	
Burmodicus	Gen. et sp. nov	In press	Chen et al.	Late Cretaceous (Cenomanian)	Burmese amber	Myanmar	A whitefly. Genus includes new species B. cretaceus.	
Caulisoculus	Gen. et 2 sp. nov	Valid	Zhang & Chen	Late Cretaceous (Cenomanian)	Burmese amber	Myanmar	A member of Pentatomomorpha belonging to the family Yuripopovinidae. Genus includes new species C. electrus Zhang & Chen and C. minutus Shang et al..	
Creocanadaphis	Gen. et sp. nov	Valid	Wegierek in Kopylov et al.	Early Cretaceous		Russia	A member of Aphidoidea belonging to the family Canadaphidae. The type species is C. hirtus.	
Cretadorus	Nom. nov	Valid	Chen in Chen et al.	Late Cretaceous (Cenomanian)	Burmese amber	Myanmar	A member of the family Sinoalidae; a replacement name for Mesodorus Chen & Wang (2019).	
Cretaleptus	Gen. et sp. nov	Valid	Sun & Chen	Late Cretaceous (Cenomanian)	Burmese amber	Myanmar	A member of Leptopodidae belonging to the subfamily Leptosaldinae. Genus includes new species C. popovi.	
Cretanazgul	Gen. et sp. nov	Valid	Garrouste et al.	Late Cretaceous (Cenomanian)	Burmese amber	Myanmar	A member of the family Nabidae. Genus includes new species C. camillei.	
Cretapsylla	Gen. et comb. nov	Disputed	Shcherbakov	Cretaceous (Barremian to Turonian)	Lebanese amber New Jersey amber	Lebanon; United States	A member of Psylloidea belonging to the family Liadopsyllidae. The type species is "Liadopsylla" apedetica Ouvrard, Burckhardt & Azar (2010); genus also includes "Liadopsylla" hesperia Ouvrard & Burckhardt (2010). The genus Cretapsylla was considered to be a junior synonym of the genus Liadopsylla by Drohojowska et al. (2020).	
Cretodorus	Gen. et 2 sp. nov	Valid	Fu & Huang	Late Cretaceous (Cenomanian)	Burmese amber	Myanmar	A planthopper belonging to the family Mimarachnidae. Genus includes new species C. granulatus and C. angustus.	
Cretopiesma engelgrimaldii	Sp. nov	Valid	Azar, Heiss & Huang	Late Cretaceous (Cenomanian)	Burmese amber	Myanmar	A member of the family Aradidae.	
Cretopiesma inexpectatum	Sp. nov	Valid	Azar, Heiss & Huang	Late Cretaceous (Cenomanian)	Burmese amber	Myanmar	A member of the family Aradidae.	
Cretopiesma lini	Sp. nov	Valid	Azar, Heiss & Huang	Late Cretaceous (Cenomanian)	Burmese amber	Myanmar	A member of the family Aradidae.	
Crosbixius	Gen. et sp. nov	Valid	Lambkin	Late Triassic (Norian)	Mount Crosby Formation	Australia	A planthopper belonging to the family Surijokocixiidae. The type species is C. carsburgi.	
Cubicostissus	Gen. et sp. nov	Valid	Bourgoin & Nel in Bourgoin, Wang & Nel	Paleocene (Selandian)		France	A member of the family Issidae or a leafhopper. The type species is C. palaeocaeni.	
Cuyanoscytinum	Gen. et sp. nov	Valid	Lara & Bashkuev	Late Triassic	Potrerillos Formation	Argentina	A member of the family Scytinopteridae. Genus includes new species C. arcucciae.	
Derbachile	Gen. et 2 sp. nov	Valid	Emeljanov & Shcherbakov	Cretaceous (Albian–Cenomanian)	Burmese amber	Myanmar	A member of the family Derbidae. The type species is D. hochae; genus also includes D. aschei.	
Dingla	Fam. nov., Gen. et sp. nov	Valid	Szwedo & Drohojowska in Drohojowska et al.	Cretaceous (Aptian-Cenomanian)	Burmese amber	Myanmar	A member of Sternorrhyncha belonging to the new family Dinglidae. The type species is D. shagria.	
Dysmorphoptiloides losrastrosensis	Sp. nov	In press	Lara et al.	Late Triassic (Carnian)	Los Rastros Formation	Argentina	A member of the family Dysmorphoptilidae.	
Electrala	Gen. et sp. nov	Valid	Chen & Zhuo in Chen et al.	Late Cretaceous (Cenomanian)	Burmese amber	Myanmar	A member of the family Sinoalidae. Genus includes new species E. muae.	
Eurypterogerron	Gen. et sp. nov	Valid	Chen et al.	Late Cretaceous (Cenomanian)	Burmese amber	Myanmar	A member of Cicadomorpha belonging to the family Minlagerrontidae. Genus includes new species E. kachinensis.	
Formosixinia	Gen. et sp. nov	Valid	Chen & Wang in Chen et al.	Late Cretaceous (Cenomanian)	Burmese amber	Myanmar	A member of Cicadomorpha belonging to the family Archijassidae. Genus includes new species F. aeterna.	
Gualoscarta	Gen. et sp. nov	In press	Lara et al.	Late Triassic (Carnian)	Los Rastros Formation	Argentina	A member of the family Dysmorphoptilidae. The type species is G. obscura.	
Isomyiomma	Gen. et sp. nov	Valid	Herczek, Popov & Drohojowska	Late Eocene	Baltic amber	Europe (Baltic Sea region	A member of the family Miridae belonging to the subfamily Isometopinae. The type species is I. hirta.	
Jatoba	Gen. et sp. nov	In press	Poinar, Vega & Stroiński	Miocene	Dominican amber	Dominican Republic	A planthopper belonging to the family Nogodinidae. Genus includes new species J. losbrachi.	
Jiaotouia burmitica	Sp. nov	Valid	Fu & Huang	Late Cretaceous (Cenomanian)	Burmese amber	Myanmar	A froghopper belonging to the family Sinoalidae.	
Karesmina	Gen. et sp. nov	Valid	Lambkin	Middle Triassic (Anisian)	Esk Formation	Australia	A planthopper belonging to the family Surijokocixiidae. The type species is K. punicea.	
Katlasus	Fam. nov., Gen. et sp. nov	Valid	Luo et al.	Late Cretaceous (Cenomanian)	Burmese amber	Myanmar	A planthopper belonging to the new family Katlasidae. Genus includes new species K. xiai.	
Khasuaphis	Gen. et sp. nov	Valid	Wegierek in Kopylov et al.	Early Cretaceous		Russia	A member of Aphidoidea belonging to the family Juraphididae. The type species is K. serotinus.	
Lanlakawa	Gen. et sp. nov	Valid	Luo et al.	Late Cretaceous (Cenomanian)	Burmese amber	Myanmar	A planthopper belonging to the family Perforissidae. Genus includes new species L. changdaensis.	
Liadopsylla lautereri	Sp. nov	Valid	Shcherbakov	Early Cretaceous		Russia	A member of Psylloidea belonging to the family Liadopsyllidae.	
Liadopsylla loginovae	Sp. nov	Valid	Shcherbakov	Early Cretaceous		Russia	A member of Psylloidea belonging to the family Liadopsyllidae.	
Licremytra	Gen. et comb. nov	Valid	Swanson	Middle to late Miocene		Germany	A member of the family Alydidae belonging to the subfamily Micrelytrinae. The type species is "Nabis" gracillimus Heer (1865).	
Macrodrilus	Fam. nov., Gen. et sp. nov	Valid	Poinar	Late Cretaceous (Cenomanian)	Burmese amber	Myanmar	A scale insect belonging to the new family Macrodrilidae. Genus includes new species M. bostrychus.	
Maculaferrum	Gen. et sp. nov	Valid	Demers-Potvin et al.	Late Cretaceous (Cenomanian)	Redmond Formation	Canada	A member of the family Tettigarctidae. The type species is M. blaisi.	
Magnusantenna	Gen. et sp. nov	Valid	Du & Chen in Du et al.	Late Cretaceous (Cenomanian)	Burmese amber	Myanmar	A member of the family Coreidae. The type species is M. wuae.	
Makrosala	Gen. et 2 sp. nov	Valid	Chen & Wang in Chen et al.	Late Cretaceous (Cenomanian)	Burmese amber	Myanmar	A member of the family Sinoalidae. Genus includes new species M. elegans and M. venusta.	
Maliawa	Gen. et sp. nov	In press	Hakim et al.	Late Cretaceous (Cenomanian)	Burmese amber	Myanmar	A member of Sternorrhyncha belonging to the group Protopsyllidioidea and to the new family Paraprotopsyllidiidae. Genus includes new species M. akrawna.	
Megagerron	Gen. et sp. nov	Valid	Chen et al.	Late Cretaceous (Cenomanian)	Burmese amber	Myanmar	A member of Cicadomorpha belonging to the family Minlagerrontidae. Genus includes new species M. zhuoi.	
Mimaeurypterus	Gen. et sp. nov	In press	Fu & Huang	Late Cretaceous (Cenomanian)	Burmese amber	Myanmar	A planthopper belonging to the family Mimarachnidae. Genus includes new species M. burmiticus.	
Mirala	Gen. et sp. nov	Valid	Burckhardt & Poinar	Late Cretaceous (Cenomanian)	Burmese amber	Myanmar	A member of Psylloidea. Genus includes new species M. burmanica.	
Morrisonnepa	Gen. et sp. nov	Valid	Lara et al.	Late Jurassic	Morrison	United States	A member of the group Nepomorpha. Genus includes new species M. jurassica.	
Occidoscelis	Gen. et sp. nov	Valid	Ryzhkova in Kopylov et al.	Early Cretaceous		Russia	A member of the family Anthocoridae. The type species is O. glaber.	
Olindasalda	Gen. et sp. nov	Valid	Moura-Júnior et al.	Early Cretaceous (Aptian)	Crato	Brazil	A member of the family Saldidae. Genus includes new species O. gondwanica.	
Ornatiala kachinensis	Sp. nov	Valid	Chen et al.	Late Cretaceous (Cenomanian)	Burmese amber	Myanmar	A froghopper belonging to the family Sinoalidae.	
Paleoanomala	Gen. et sp. nov	Valid	Poinar & Vega	Cretaceous (Albian-Cenomanian)	Burmese amber	Myanmar	A member of the family Tingidae. The type species is P. aptenus.	
Paleolepidotus	Gen. et sp. nov	Valid	Poinar, Vega & Schneider	Cretaceous (Albian-Cenomanian)	Burmese amber	Myanmar	A scale insect. Genus includes new species P. macrocolus.	
Paraburmoselis	Gen. et sp. nov	Valid	Chen et al.	Late Cretaceous (Cenomanian)	Burmese amber	Myanmar	A whitefly. Genus includes new species P. kachinensis.	
Paraprotopsyllidium	Fam. nov., Gen. et sp. nov	In press	Hakim et al.	Late Cretaceous (Cenomanian)	Burmese amber	Myanmar	A member of Sternorrhyncha belonging to the group Protopsyllidioidea and to the new family Paraprotopsyllidiidae. Genus includes new species P. spinosum.	
Procercopina daohugouensis	Sp. nov	Valid	Fu & Huang	Middle–Late Jurassic	Daohugou Beds	China	A froghopper belonging to the family Procercopidae. Announced in 2020; the final version of the article naming it was published in 2021.	
Procercopina lini	Sp. nov	Valid	Fu & Huang	Middle–Late Jurassic	Daohugou Beds	China	A froghopper belonging to the family Procercopidae. Announced in 2020; the final version of the article naming it was published in 2021.	
Psilargus	Gen. et sp. nov	Valid	Shcherbakov	Late Cretaceous (Cenomanian)	Burmese amber	Myanmar	A planthopper belonging to the family Jubisentidae. The type species is P. anufrievi.	
Pullneyocoris	Gen. et sp. nov	Valid	Lis et al.	Late Cretaceous (Cenomanian)	Burmese amber	Myanmar	A member of the family Cydnidae. Genus includes new species P. dentatus.	
Qibinius	Gen. et sp. nov	Valid	Fu & Huang	Middle–Late Jurassic	Yanan Formation	China	A froghopper. Genus includes new species Q. maculatus.	
Quacsa	Gen. et comb. nov	In press	Ryzhkova & Kopylov			Russia	A member of the family Archegocimicidae. Genus includes Q. ignota (Popov, 1988).	
Reticycla	Gen. et sp. nov	Valid	Shcherbakov	Early Cretaceous		Russia	A member of Cicadomorpha belonging to the family Hylicellidae. The type species is R. drosopoulosi.	
Rovnotettix	Gen. et sp. nov	Valid	Dietrich & Perkovsky	Eocene	Rovno amber	Ukraine	A leafhopper. Genus includes new species R. brachypterus.	
Sinomorphoptila	Gen. et sp. nov	Valid	Fu & Huang	Middle Permian		China	A member of Cicadomorpha belonging to the family Dysmorphoptilidae. Genus includes new species S. incompleta.	
Stellularis bineuris	Sp. nov	Valid	Chen & Wang in Chen et al.	Early Cretaceous	Yixian Formation	China	A froghopper belonging to the family Procercopidae. Announced in 2019; the final version of the article naming it was published in 2020.	
Stellularis minutus	Sp. nov	Valid	Chen & Wang in Chen et al.	Early Cretaceous	Yixian Formation	China	A froghopper belonging to the family Procercopidae. Announced in 2019; the final version of the article naming it was published in 2020.	
Stellularis sinuijuensis	Sp. nov	Valid	Jon et al.	Early Cretaceous	Sinuiju Formation	North Korea	A froghopper belonging to the family Procercopidae.	
Stigmapsylla	Gen. et sp. nov	Valid	Shcherbakov	Early Cretaceous		Russia	A member of Psylloidea belonging to the family Liadopsyllidae. The type species is S. klimaszewskii.	
Stylocentrus hui	Sp. nov	Valid	Wang, Zhang & Yao in Wang et al.	Cenozoic	Dominican amber	Dominican Republic	A treehopper. Announced in 2020; the final version of the article naming it was published in 2021.	
Tanyocicada	Gen. et comb. nov	Valid	Moulds	Miocene	Shanwang fossil beds	China	A member of the family Cicadidae. Genus includes "Oncotympana" lapidescens Zhang (1989).	
Tingiometra pankowskii	Sp. nov	Valid	Golub & Heiss	Late Cretaceous (Cenomanian)	Burmese amber	Myanmar	A member of the family Tingidae.	
Tingiometra secunda	Sp. nov	Valid	Golub & Heiss	Late Cretaceous (Cenomanian)	Burmese amber	Myanmar	A member of the family Tingidae.	
Tingiometra yuripopovi	Sp. nov	Valid	Golub & Heiss	Late Cretaceous (Cenomanian)	Burmese amber	Myanmar	A member of the family Tingidae.	
Tipuloidea cuyana	Sp. nov	Valid	Lara & Bashkuev	Late Triassic	Potrerillos Formation	Argentina	A member of the family Scytinopteridae.	
Yuripachys	Nom. nov.	Valid	Kment, Carapezza & Jindra	Early Cretaceous	Gurban-Eren Formation	Mongolia	A member of the family Ochteridae; a replacement name for Meropachys Popov (1986).	

==== Hemipteran research ====
- Revision of the cicadomorph genera Ipsvicia and Ipsviciopsis from the Upper Triassic Blackstone Formation (Australia) is published by Lambkin (2020).

=== Psocodea ===
Name	Novelty	Status	Authors	Age	Type locality	Country	Notes	Images
Azarpsocus	Gen. et sp. nov	Valid	Maheu & Nel	Late Cretaceous (Cenomanian)	Burmese amber	Myanmar	A member of Troctomorpha belonging to the family Manicapsocidae. Genus includes new species A. perreaui.	
Burmacompsocus pouilloni	Sp. nov	In press	Ngô-Muller, Garrouste & Nel	Late Cretaceous (Cenomanian)	Burmese amber	Myanmar	A member of the family Compsocidae.	
Burmempheria	Gen. et 2 sp. nov	Valid	Li, Wang & Yao in Li et al.	Late Cretaceous (Cenomanian)	Burmese amber	Myanmar	A member of Psocoptera belonging to the group Trogiomorpha and the family Empheriidae. Genus includes new species B. densuschaetae and B. raruschaetae.	
Cormopsocus	Fam. nov., Gen. et sp. nov	Valid	Yoshizawa & Lienhard	Late Cretaceous (Cenomanian)	Burmese amber	Myanmar	A member of Trogiomorpha belonging to the new family Cormopsocidae Genus includes new species C. groehni.	
Cretolepinotus	Gen. et sp. nov	In press	Cockx et al.	Late Cretaceous (Campanian)	Wapiti Formation	Canada	A member of Psocodea belonging to the family Trogiidae. Genus includes new species C. tankei.	
Paramanicapsocus	Gen. et sp. nov	In press	Hakim, Azar & Huang	Late Cretaceous (Cenomanian)	Burmese amber	Myanmar	A member of Amphientometae belonging to the family Manicapsocidae. Genus includes new species P. longiantennatus.	
Psyllipsocus yoshizawai	Sp. nov	In press	Álvarez-Parra et al.	Late Cretaceous (Cenomanian)	Burmese amber	Myanmar	A member of Trogiomorpha belonging to the family Psyllipsocidae; a species of Psyllipsocus.	

=== Thysanoptera ===
Name	Novelty	Status	Authors	Age	Type locality	Country	Notes	Images
Ankothrips deploegi	Sp. nov	Valid	Nel et al.	Early Eocene	Oise amber	France	A thrips belonging to the family Melanthripidae.	
Ankothrips dupeae	Sp. nov	Valid	Nel et al.	Late Cretaceous	Vendean amber	France	A thrips belonging to the family Melanthripidae.	
Merothrips aithiopicus	Sp. nov	Valid	Ulitzka		Ethiopian amber	Ethiopia	A thrips, a species of Merothrips.	
Tobleronothrips	Gen. et sp. nov	Valid	Shmakov in Kopylov et al.	Early Cretaceous		Russia	A thrips belonging to the family Aeolothripidae. The type species is T. deparis.	

== Clade Perlidea ==
=== Dermapterans ===
Name	Novelty	Status	Authors	Age	Type locality	Country	Notes	Images
Acantholabis	Gen. et sp. nov	Valid	Mao, Engel, & Ren in Mao et al.	Late Cretaceous (Cenomanian)	Burmese amber	Myanmar	An earwig belonging to the family Labiduridae. Genus includes new species A. coralloides.	
Astreptolabis laevis	Sp. nov	Valid	Mao et al.	Late Cretaceous (Cenomanian)	Burmese amber	Myanmar	An earwig.	Astreptolabis laevis

=== Embioptera ===
Name	Novelty	Status	Authors	Age	Type locality	Country	Notes	Images
Gnethoda	Gen. et 2 sp. nov	In press	Cui & Engel in Cui, Chen, & Engel	Late Cretaceous (Cenomanian)	Burmese amber	Myanmar	A clothodid webspinner. Genus includes new species G. symmetrica and G. ancyla.	
Henoclothoda	Gen. et sp. nov	In press	Cui & Engel in Cui, Chen, & Engel	Late Cretaceous (Cenomanian)	Burmese amber	Myanmar	A clothodid webspinner. Genus includes new species H. simplex.	

=== Phasmatodea ===
Name	Novelty	Status	Authors	Age	Type locality	Country	Notes	Images
Aclistophasma	Gen. et sp. nov	In press	Yang, Engel & Gao in Yang et al.	Middle Jurassic	Jiulongshan Formation	China	A member of Phasmatodea belonging to the family Susumaniidae. The type species is A. echinulatum.	
Archisusumania	Gen. et sp. nov	Valid	Gorochov in Kopylov et al.	Early Cretaceous		Russia	A member of Phasmatodea belonging to the family Susumaniidae. The type species is A. contacta.	
Cretophasmomima traceyae	Sp. nov	Valid	Xu, Jarzembowski & Fang	Early Cretaceous	Weald Clay Formation	United Kingdom	A member of Phasmatodea belonging to the group Susumanioidea.	
Liutiaogoucuna	Gen. et sp. nov	In press	Xu et al.	Early Cretaceous	Yixian Formation	China	A member of Phasmatodea belonging to the family Susumaniidae. Genus includes new species L. arachnoidea.	

=== Plecopterans ===
Name	Novelty	Status	Authors	Age	Type locality	Country	Notes	Images
Borisoperla	Gen. et sp. nov	Valid	Chen & Xu	Late Cretaceous (Cenomanian)	Burmese amber	Myanmar	A member of the family Peltoperlidae. Genus includes new species B. kondratieffi.	
Branchioperla	Gen. et sp. nov	Valid	Sroka & Staniczek	Late Cretaceous (Cenomanian)	Burmese amber	Myanmar	A member of the family Petroperlidae. Genus includes new species B. ianstewarti.	
Burperla	Gen. et sp. nov	Valid	Chen	Late Cretaceous (Cenomanian)	Burmese amber	Myanmar	A member of the family Perlidae. Genus includes new species B. decolorata.	
Cretacroneuria	Gen. et sp. nov	Valid	Chen	Late Cretaceous (Cenomanian)	Burmese amber	Myanmar	A member of the family Perlidae. Genus includes new species C. angularis.	
Starkoperla	Gen. et sp. nov	Valid	Chen & Wang	Late Cretaceous (Cenomanian)	Burmese amber	Myanmar	A member of the family Perlidae. Genus includes new species S. longusocollum.	
Zwickoperla	Gen. et sp. nov	Valid	Chen & Wang	Late Cretaceous (Cenomanian)	Burmese amber	Myanmar	A member of the family Perlidae or Peltoperlidae. Genus includes new species Z. brevicauda.	

== Clade †Reculida ==
=== †Cnemidolestida ===
Name	Novelty	Status	Authors	Age	Type locality	Location	Notes	Images
Chauliodites sakmaris	Sp. nov	Valid	Aristov	Early Triassic (Olenekian)		Russia	A Chaulioditidae Cnemidolestid Reculidan	
Sharovala	Gen. et sp. nov	Valid	Aristov	Middle Triassic (Ladinian)	Madygen Formation	Kyrgyzstan	A Sylvabestiidae Cnemidolestidan. The type species is S. triassica.	
Shurabia creta	Sp. nov	Valid	Aristov in Kopylov et al.	Early Cretaceous		Russia	A Geinitziidae Reculidan.	

=== Other Reculida ===
Name	Novelty	Status	Authors	Age	Type locality	Country	Notes	Images
Batkenopterum	Gen. et sp. nov	Valid	Aristov	Middle Triassic (Ladinian)	Madygen Formation	Kyrgyzstan	A member of Polyneoptera belonging to the group Reculida and the family Sylvaphlebiidae. Genus includes new species B. kirgizicum.	
Chauliodites babiy	Sp. nov	Valid	Aristov	Late Permian		Russia	A member of Polyneoptera belonging to the group Reculida and the family Chaulioditidae.	
Khosara ultima	Sp. nov	Valid	Aristov	Late Permian		Russia	A member of Polyneoptera belonging to the group Reculida and the family Liomopteridae.	
Permoshurabia tshasha	Sp. nov	Valid	Aristov	Late Permian		Russia	A member of Polyneoptera belonging to the group Reculida and the family Geinitziidae.	
Permotoma	Gen. et sp. nov	Valid	Aristov	Late Permian		Russia	A member of Polyneoptera belonging to the group Reculida and the family Skaliciidae. Genus includes new species P. aba.	
Permuliercula	Gen. et sp. nov	Valid	Aristov	Late Permian		Russia	A member of Polyneoptera belonging to the group Reculida and the family Geinitziidae. Genus includes new species P. chimaera.	
Stegopterum kabalum	Sp. nov	Valid	Aristov	Late Permian		Russia	A member of Polyneoptera belonging to the group Reculida and the family Geinitziidae.	
Stegopterum pashka	Sp. nov	Valid	Aristov	Late Permian		Russia	A member of Polyneoptera belonging to the group Reculida and the family Geinitziidae.	

== Other insects ==
Name	Novelty	Status	Authors	Age	Type locality	Country	Notes	Images
Oborella monsjovisensis	Sp. nov	Valid	Poschmann & Nel	Early Permian	Saar–Nahe Basin	Germany	A member of Grylloblattida.	
Partisaniferus	Gen. et sp. nov	Valid	Haug et al.	Late Cretaceous (Cenomanian)	Burmese amber	Myanmar	A member of Neuropteriformia of uncertain phylogenetic placement. The type species is P. atrickmuelleri.	
Tarakanikha	Gen. et sp. nov	Valid	Aristov	Late Permian		Russia	A member of Polyneoptera of uncertain phylogenetic placement. Genus includes new species T. satura.	

== General research ==
- Two pieces of Burmese amber, preserving several closely associated stylets of lacewing larvae (likely representing regurgitated remains previously consumed by an unknown predator) and a mite inserted with its anterior body into a lacewing larva and likely preying on it, are described by Hörnig et al. (2020).
- A study on the morphology and phylogenetic relationships of the mysteriomorphid beetles, based on data from new specimens from the Cretaceous Burmese amber, is published by Peris et al. (2020).
- Baranov et al. (2020) describe new records of Mesozoic and Cenozoic stratiomyomorphan fly larvae representing six discrete morphotypes, and evaluate the implications of these specimens for the knowledge of stratiomyomorphan ecomorphology and ecology throughout their evolutionary history.
- Evidence of the presence of diverse metallic colours in beetles, flies and hymenopterans from the Cretaceous Burmese amber is presented by Cai et al. (2020).
