= Khasurty locality =

Fossil locality in Russia

- Stratigraphic range: Neocomian; ~145–130 Ma
- Unit of: Gusinoe Ozero Group

Location
- Region: Zakamensky District
- Country: Russia

Type section
- Named for: Khasurty River

The Khasurty locality is an Early Cretaceous (Neocomian) lagerstätte in Russia, within the Sangin Formation. This lagerstätte is located outside the village of Tsakir in the region of Zakamensk. Over 6,000 insect specimens have been found from the site, belonging to around 130 families. Its insect biota resembles both Jurassic and Cretaceous ones, most heavily the Jehol biota of China.

== Paleobiota ==
Color key
Taxon	Reclassified taxon	Taxon falsely reported as present	Dubious taxon or junior synonym	Ichnotaxon	Ootaxon	Morphotaxon

Notes
Uncertain or tentative taxa are in small text; ~~crossed out~~ taxa are discredited.

=== Non-Insecta ===
Non-insect organisms
Genus	Species	Higher taxon	Notes	Images
Palaeoeorak	P. scherbakovi	Prochydorusidae (Anomopoda)	Only named crustacean from Khasurty	The extant anomopod Daphnia magna
Bryokhutuliinia	B. obtusifolia	Hookeriales?	Indeterminate family	
Khasurtya	K. ginkgoides	Marchantiidae	Specific name comes from the similarity in leaf shape to the ginkgo	
Khasurtythallus	K. monosolenioides	Marchantiidae	Likely an extinct clade of liverworts	
Palaeodichelyma	P. sinitzae	Hypnanae (pleurocarpous mosses)	Also known from the Jurassic of Russia	
Tricostium	T. longifolium	Bryophyta incertae sedis	Similar to a species found ~2000 km to the east	

=== Insects ===
==== Palaeopterans ====
Palaeopterans
Genus	Species	Higher taxon	Notes	Images
Baikalogenites	B. firmus	Hexagenitidae (Ephemeroptera)	Bears a longer seventh gill pair	
Epiproctophora spp.	Unapplicable	Odonata	Known from several unnamed species, most seemingly within Isophlebiidae or Campterophlebiidae	Isophlebia aspasia specimen from the Jurassic of Germany
Furvoneta	F. khasurtensis	Mesonetidae (Ephemeroptera)	Largest member of the genus	
Mesobaetis	M. crispa	Siphlonuridae	Similar to the species M. amplectus, but has a larger rib on its gill plates	
Mesogenesia	M. sp	Mickoleitiidae	Only known from a poorly preserved specimen	Larva of the closely related Mickoleitia
Proameletus	P. branchiatus	Siphlonuridae	Bears larger gills than the type species	

==== Polyneopterans ====
Polyneopterans
Genus	Species	Higher taxon	Notes	Images
Aboilus?	A?. khasurty	Prophalangopsidae	Differs from Aboilus in wing venation, but still fairly close to it	Pycnophlebia fossil from Jurassic Germany
Archisusumania	A. contacta	Susumanioidea	Differs from other genera in wing venation	Three specimens of the closely related Cretophasmomima from China
Dimoula	D. khasurtensis	Nemouridae	One of the few extinct nemourids known	Nemoura cinerea, an extant nemourid
Jurataenionema	J. rohdendorfi	Taeniopterygidae	Known from a complete female specimen	Taeniopteryx nebulosa, an extant taeniopterygid
Mongoloxya	M. fossor	Tridactylidae	Differs from the other species in the genus by having digging-adapted forelimbs	An unidentified extant tridactylid from India
Rasnitsyrina	R. culonga, R. desiliens	Perlariopseidae (Plecoptera)	Most abundant stonefly from the site	
Shurabia	S. creta	Geinitziidae	Latest known winged notopteran besides those known from Burmese amber	
Siberoperla	S. bashkuevi	Peltoperlidae	Oldest peltoperlid, alongside the first fossil of a nymph from the family	An indeterminate peltoperlid nymph

==== Paraneopterans ====
Paraneopterans
Genus	Species	Higher taxon	Notes	Images
Buryatocera	B. beta	Kobdocoridae (Pentatomoidea)	Has relatively short antennae	
Creocanadaphis	C. hirtus	Canadaphididae	Abdomen bears numerous small spines on sclerites	
Extralapis	E. carens, E. breviscutum	Kobdocoridae	Intermediate between the two other kobdocorid genera from Khasurty in pronotum (top-front section of thorax) proportions	
Khasuaphis	K. serotinus	Juraphididae	Bears longer antennae than other members of its family	
Khasoris	K. yuripopovi	Kobdocoridae (Pentatomoidea)	Bears a very long ovipositor	
Liadopsylla	L. (Basicella) lauteri, L. (Basicella) loginovae	Liadopsyllidae	Type genus of the family	
Occidoscelis	O. glaber	Anthocorinae	One of the only fossil anthocorids known	Anthocoris nemorum, an extant anthocorine bug
Reticycla	R. drospoulosi	Hylicellidae (Cicadomorpha)	Has a smaller ovipositor and a different foreleg structure to most other hylicellids	
Stigmapsylla	S. klimaszewskii	Liadopsyllidae	Bears a dark pterostigma	Holotype of Amecephala pusilla, a different liadopsyllid from Burmese amber
Tobleronothrips	T. deparis	Aeolothripidae	Named for Toblerone chocolate, which "noticeably helps when identifying complex imprints of thrips"	The modern Erythrothrips, another aeolothripid species

==== Holometabola ====
===== Hymenopterans =====
Hymenopterans
Genus	Species	Higher taxon	Notes	Images
Amplicella	A. mininae, A. bashkuyevi, A. shcherbakovi, A. minor	Tanychorinae (Ichneumonidae)	Has a dark body with lighter legs/wing veins	Tanychora petiolata fossil from the Zaza Formation
Ghilarella	G. kopylovi	Sepulcidae	Originally placed within G. mercurialis, as it only differed from the type of that species in wing colouration	
Hymenoptera spp.	Unapplicable	Holometabola	Includes numerous undescribed species from within various families like Angarosphecidae, Megalyridae and Proctotrupidae	
Khasips	K. alisecta, K. sculpta, K. kovalevi	Archaeocynipidae (Cynipoidea)	K. kovalevi has clubbed antennae, K. sculpta has an unusual pattern on its thorax	
Khasurtella	K. buryatica	Tanychorinae (Ichneumonidae)	Genus also contains a former Tanychora species	
Micramphilius	M. mirabilipennis	Sepulcidae	First member of its genus which preserves the hind wings	
Onokhoius	O. venustus	Sepulcidae	Bears a dark band on its pterostigma	
Pamparaphilius	P. khasurtensis	Sepulcidae	Holotype wing has numerous unusual veins, likely as a result of mutation	
Parasyntexis	P. khasurtensis	Anaxyelidae		
Praeichneumon	P. dzhidensis, P. khamardabanicus, P. zakhaaminicus	Praeichneumonidae	Known from several mostly complete specimens	
Sclerostigma	S. trimaculata	Dolichostigmatinae (Anaxyelidae)	Species name means "three-spotted", as its abdominal tergites have patterns of three spots	
Trematothorax	T. zhangi, T. brachyurus, T. extravenosus	Sepulcidae	Another distinct species is known, however the material is too poor to name a new taxon	

===== Neuropteridans =====
Neuropteridans
Genus	Species	Higher taxon	Notes	Images
Aberrantochrysa	A. buryatica, A. pulchella	Chrysopidae		
Cretohondelagia	C. viridis	Priscaenigmatidae (Raphidioptera)	Youngest priscaenigmatid fossil known	
Dzhidosmylus	D. solus	Osmylidae	Uncertain subfamily	
Khasurtoberotha	K. bellissima	Berothidae	Similar to the modern Protobiella	A specimen of the extant berothid Protobiella
Mesypochrysa	M. cannabina, M. naranica	Chrysopidae		
Osmylochrysa	O. navasia	Osmylidae	Previously only known from England, resembles chrysopid lacewings	
Zakamnosmylus	Z. elongatus	Osmylidae	Similar to the Jurassic Ensiosmylus	

===== Coleopterans =====
Coleopterans
Genus	Species	Higher taxon	Notes	Images
Coleoptera spp.	Unapplicable	Coleoptera	Contains many undescribed species in families such as Staphylinidae and Scarabaeidae	
Coptoclava	C. longipoda	Coptoclavidae	May not actually belong to the species	Coptoclava larva from the Jinju Formation
Distenorrhinus	D. (Buryatnemonyx) ovatus, D. (Buryatnemonyx) gratshevi	Nemonychidae	Another undescribed species bears very large eyes	
Gracilicupes	G. minimus	Cupedidae	Much smaller than other species of the genus	
Jurodes	J. shef	Jurodidae	Similar to Jurodes from Daohugou	Fossil of Jurodes
Notocupes	N. khasurtyiensis	Archostemata incertae sedis	Has larger eyes and a shorter first abdominal segment than other species in the genus	Several Notocupes specimens from Jurassic China alongside mid-Cretaceous Burmese amber
Palaeonecrophilus	P. buryaticus	Agyrtidae	Earliest known agyrtid beetle	The extant agyrtid Necrophilus subterraneus
Ponohydrochus	P. buryaticus	Hydrochidae	First fossil hydrochid genus	An extant Hydrochus beetle
Unda	U. popovi	Trachypachidae	Also known from the Jurassic	The extant trachypachid Trachypachus gibbsii

===== Mecopterans =====
Mecopterans
Genus	Species	Higher taxon	Notes	Images
Antiquanabittacus	A. dispar, A. robustus, A. saltator	Bittacidae	Similar to extant Orobittacus	The extant bittacid Bittacus selysi
Itaphlebia	I. spp	Nannochoristidae	Known from very well-preserved material, however the difficult diagnosis of Itaphlebia species means the Khasurty species have not been named	The extant nannochoristid Nannochorista philpotti
Lichnomesopsyche	L. sp	Mesopsychidae	Only known from one wing	Complete specimen of L. daohugouensis from Jurassic China
Meropeidae spp.	Unapplicable	Mecoptera	Known from two different species each with a complete specimen, unusual for meropeids (which rarely fly)	The extant meropeid Merope tuber
Mesochorista	M. sp	Permochoristidae (related to Nannochoristidae)	Formerly known as "Yanorthophlebia", which is a synonym of "Liassochorista" and in turn Mesochorista	

===== Dipterans =====
Dipterans
Genus	Species	Higher taxon	Notes	Images
Amorimyia	A. robusta	Anisopodidae	Differs from related genera in its hairy head and larger size	
Collessomma	C. sibirica, C. gnoma	Perissommatidae	Unlike modern perissommatids, this genus has fused (holoptic) eyes	The extant perissommatid Perissomma mcalpinei
Eoptychoptera	E. fasbenderi	Ptychopteridae	Distinguished from other species in its genus by an additional cross-vein on the wing	The extant ptychopterid Ptychoptera contaminata
Gilkania	G. transbaikalica	Podonominae (Chironomidae)	Only known from pupal exuvia	
Juraxymyia	J. krzeminskii	Axymyiidae	Also known from Daohugou	The extant axymyiid Axymyia furcata
Kaluginamyia	K. enigmatica	Kaluginamyiidae (Chironomoidea)	Placed in its own family	
Kovalevimyia	K. sp	Simuliidae	One of the earliest hematophagous fly fossils, likely fed on birds	
Mangas	M. brevisubcosta, M. kovalevi	Bolitophilidae	Also known from Mongolia	The extant bolitophilid Bolitophila cinerea
Praearchitipula	P. kaluginae, P. podenasi, P. ribeiroi	Pediciidae	Relatively large for pediciids	The extant pediciid Pedicia margarita
Protanyderus?	P. madrizi	Tanyderidae	May not belong to the genus	
Sinaxymyia	S. szadziewskii	Axymyiidae	Also known from Daohugou	
Zhiganka	Z. longialata	Ptychopteridae	Known from complete specimens	The extant ptychopterid Bittacomorpha clavipes

===== Amphiesmenopterans =====
Amphiesmenopterans
Genus	Species	Higher taxon	Notes	Images
Axiomaldia	A. flinti	Trichoptera	Uncertain family	
Buranima	B. gorhon	Psychomyiidae	Differs from other genera in having a maxillary palp without a longer second segment	The extant psychomyiid Tinodes waeneri
Burimodus	B. novus	Vitimotauliidae (Trichoptera)		
Buryatocentrus	B. suspiciosus	Yantarocentridae (Limnephiloidea)	Has two-segmented gonopods	
Cretocrania	C. stekolnikovi, C. glossancestralis, C. inconcessa	Cretocraniinae (Eriocraniidae)	Differs from modern eriocraniids in having round wing tips and very long galeae	The extant eriocraniid Eriocrania semipurpurella
Dauroglos	D. hohlomak	Glossosomatidae	Similar to the genus Dajella	The extant Glossosoma intermedium
Duamodus	D. anichkovi, D. necessarius	Vitimotauliidae (Integripalpia)	Similar to Multimodus	
Dysoneura	D. subbota	Dysoneuridae	Specific name derives from the Russian word for "Saturday"	
Khasurtia	K. kopylovi, K. alexeii, K. lukashevichae, K. novissima	Dysoneuridae	A fairly diverse caddisfly genus, almost entirely known from Khasurty	
Juraphilopotamus	J. callidus	Philopotamidae	Has small dark spots on forewing	The extant philopotamid Philopotamus montanus
Meloclada	M. diuturna, M. frequentatoria	Cladochoristidae (Trichoptera)	Similar to the related Cladochoristella	
Mesocolepus	M. deflectum	Ptilocolepidae (Hydroptiloidea)	Bears large setal warts, with their shape used to distinguish the genus	
Multimodus	M. amplus	Vitimotauliidae (Trichoptera)	Largest species of the genus	
Palaeosiberomiya	P. zugzwanga	Dysoneuridae	Bears longitudinal stripes of dark scales on its wings	
Protobaikalopsyche	P. rossica	Protobaikalopsychidae (Hydropsychoidea)	Likely basal to a clade including Polycentropodidae	
Protorodinia	P. khasurtensis	Leptoceridae	Bears a large mesoscutum and unusual abdominal tip	The extant leptocerid Leptocerus tineiformis
Protosiberopteryx	P. antitheton, P. equesaeneus, P. praevernalis	Eolepidopterigidae	Known from one male and two female specimens, similar to Undopterix	
Purbimodus	P. parvulus, P. khramovi	Vitimotauliidae (Trichoptera)	Redescribed in a 2021 paper	
Sententimiya	S. wichardi	Psychomyiidae	Bears a plate on the fifth sternite similar to those on psychomyiids	
Shadareniskia	S. inambularia	Hydrobiosidae	Known from a female specimen, as shown by the genitalia and a suture on the sixth sternite	The (male) holotype of the extant Hydrobiosis falcis
Siberocretopetus	S. ekaterinae	Glossosomatidae	Specific name honours Ekaterina Sidorchuk, a palaeoacarologist (researcher who studies fossil mites) who died in 2019	The extant agapetine glossosomatid Agapetus fuscipes
Siberoprostoria	S. archaeoscriptor	Hydrobiosidae	Known from a female specimen, as shown by the genitalia and a suture on the sixth sternite	
Styxowia	S. predponimania	Polycentropodidae	Has large, spiny gonopods	The extant polycentropodid Polycentropus flavomaculatus
Susurimiya	S. transbaikalica	Psychomyiidae	Bears a swollen abdomen tip like modern psychomyiids, but differs in the structure of its maxillary palps	
Terminoptysma	T. contradictoria	Terminoptysmatidae (Trichoptera)	Placed in its own monotypic family	
Terrindusia	T. khasurtica, T. buriatica	Trichoptera	Known only from larval casings	
