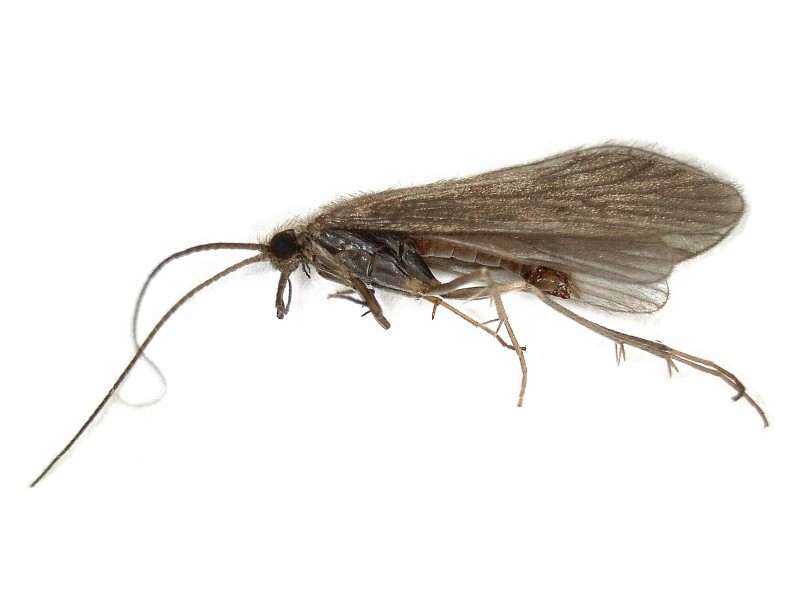
- Male Tinodes waeneri

Scientific classification
- Kingdom: Animalia
- Phylum: Arthropoda
- Clade: Pancrustacea
- Class: Insecta
- Order: Trichoptera
- Family: Psychomyiidae
- Genus: Tinodes
- Species: T. waeneri

Binomial name
- Tinodes waeneri (Linnaeus, 1758)

Synonyms
- Phryganea waeneri (Linnaeus, 1758)

= Tinodes waeneri =

Species of insect

Tinodes waeneri, the small red sedge, is a species of caddisfly belonging to the family Psychomyiidae. It is widespread across Europe, particularly in freshwater habitats such as streams, rivers, lakes, and ponds.

== Description ==
Often presenting with a forewing length of 6-9mm, Tinodes waeneri has reddish-brown forewings and darker veins. Adult Tinodes waeneri are small insects measuring 5–9 mm in length. They are typically light reddish-brown in colour, with darker veins. The hindwings are narrow, with the front edge slightly cut away towards the tip. Adults are often attracted to light sources and are most commonly observed between May and September.

== Range ==
Tinodes waeneri are commonly found in Central, Western, and parts of Northern and Southern Europe. This species inhabits clean freshwater environments, including streams, rivers, pools, and lakes.

== Habitat ==
Tinodes waeneri are commonly seen May to September and are often found near streams, lakes and rivers.
