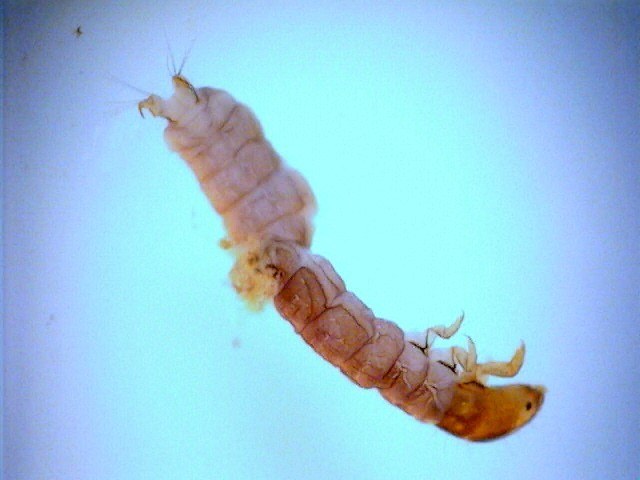

Scientific classification
- Kingdom: Animalia
- Phylum: Arthropoda
- Clade: Pancrustacea
- Class: Insecta
- Order: Trichoptera
- Family: Psychomyiidae
- Genus: Lype
- Species: L. diversa

Binomial name
- Lype diversa (Banks, 1914)

= Lype diversa =

Species of caddisfly

Lype diversa is a species of net tube caddisfly in the family Psychomyiidae. It is found in North America.
