= Eoprephasma =

Eoprephasma Temporal range: Ypresian

Scientific classification
- Kingdom: Animalia
- Phylum: Arthropoda
- Class: Insecta
- Order: Phasmatodea
- Family: †Susumaniidae
- Subfamily: †Susumaniinae
- Genus: †Eoprephasma; Archibald & Bradler, 2015
- Species: †E. hichensi

Binomial name
- †Eoprephasma hichensi Archibald & Bradler, 2015

Extinct genus of insects

Eoprephasma is an extinct genus of stick insect in the susumaniid subfamily Susumaniinae known from a group of Eocene fossils found in North America. When first described there was a single named species, Eoprephasma hichensi.

== History and classification ==
When described, Eoprephasma was known from two isolated wings which are compression-impression fossils preserved in a layer of soft sedimentary rock. Along with other well preserved insect fossils, the Eoprephasma specimens were collected from layers of Ypresian age Lagerstätte lake sediments Washington, USA, and an additional three partial Susumanioidea fossils were recovered from British Columbia, Canada. The partial Susumanioidea specimens were found in the Tranquille Formation belonging to the Kamloops group that outcrops at the McAbee Fossil Beds near Cache Creek, BC. The two E. hichensi wing were recovered from the Tom Thumb Tuff member of the Klondike Mountain Formation in Republic, Washington which is designated the type locality for the species, with the holotype recovered from the "Boot hill" site #B4131, and the paratype from the "Corner lot" site #A0307.

At the time of description, the species type series consisted of the holotype specimen, SR 12-004-007 and paratype specimen SR 93-10-02 were preserved in the Stonerose Interpretive Center fossil collections. The three Susumanioidea fossils, part/counterpart F-846 and F-951 plus F-1392 and F-1393 are deposited in the Thompson Rivers University. The counterpart specimen F-1099 is also in the Thompson Rivers University collections, while the part side, PB-3825 is at the Burke Museum of Natural History and Culture. All the insects were first studied by Canadian entomologist S Bruce Archibald and German entomologist Sven Bradler, with their 2015 type description of the new genus and species being published in the journal Canadian Entomology. Archibald and Bradler noted the genus name to be a combination of "eo", from Eocene, "pre" and "Phasma", referencing the status of the genus as a stem group phasmatodean. The specific epithet hichensi is in honor of Keir Hichens, who first found the specimen in 2012 and donated it to the Stonerose Interpretive Center.

The fossils were described by Archibald and Bradler as the youngest members of the Phasmatodea stem group lineage Susumanioidea. Prior to the 2015 paper, the oldest Susumanioidea were Chinese fossils dating to the Jurassic, while the youngest member of the superfamily dated to the Paleocene Paskapoo Formation in Alberta, Canada. Due to the incomplete nature of the McAbee fossils, it was not possible for Archibald and Bradler to distinguish them from the Canadian fossils, which are also incomplete. Phylogenetic analysis of Susumanioidea published by Yang et al (2021) resulted in placement of Eoprephasma as the sister group to Renphasma deep within the Susumaniidae subfamily Susumaniinae.

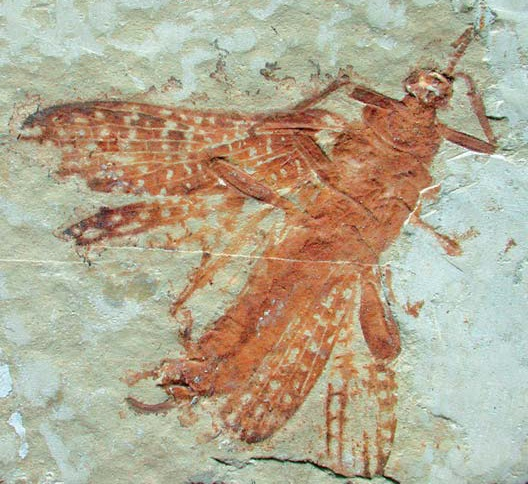
Renphasma sinica, Cretaceous sister taxon to Eoprephasma

== Description ==
The Eoprephasma hichensi specimens are both well preserved, though partial, forewings. The overall length of the holotype forewing is 22 mm (0.87 in) long and has an estimated width of 5.5 mm (0.22 in). The paratype is notably smaller, being approximately 15.4 mm (0.61 in) and only about 4.0 mm (0.16 in) wide. Both wings have a dark coloration, light veins of varying width, and numerous cross-veins. The wings are distinguished from other Susumanioidea members by both the CuA, apical cubitus vein, and the CuPα, posterior cubitus alpha vein, being forked.
