= Prochita =

Scientific classification
- Kingdom: Animalia
- Phylum: Arthropoda
- Clade: Pancrustacea
- Class: Insecta
- Order: Trichoptera
- Family: †Dysoneuridae
- Genus: †Prochita; Sukatsheva & Vassilenko, 2013
- Species: †P. rasnitsyni

Binomial name
- †Prochita rasnitsyni Sukatsheva & Vassilenko, 2013

Extinct genus of caddisflies

Prochita is an extinct genus of caddisflies in the family Dysoneuridae. It contains only one species, Prochita rasnitsyni. The genus is known from the Upper Jurassic—Lower Cretaceous of the Transbaikal region of Russia.

The genus is named after the city of Chita, and the species is named after the Russian paleoentomologist Alexandr Rasnitsyn.
