= Redmond Formation =

Geologic formation in Newfoundland and Labrador, Canada

- Stratigraphic range: Early Cenomanian; 99.7–94.3 Ma
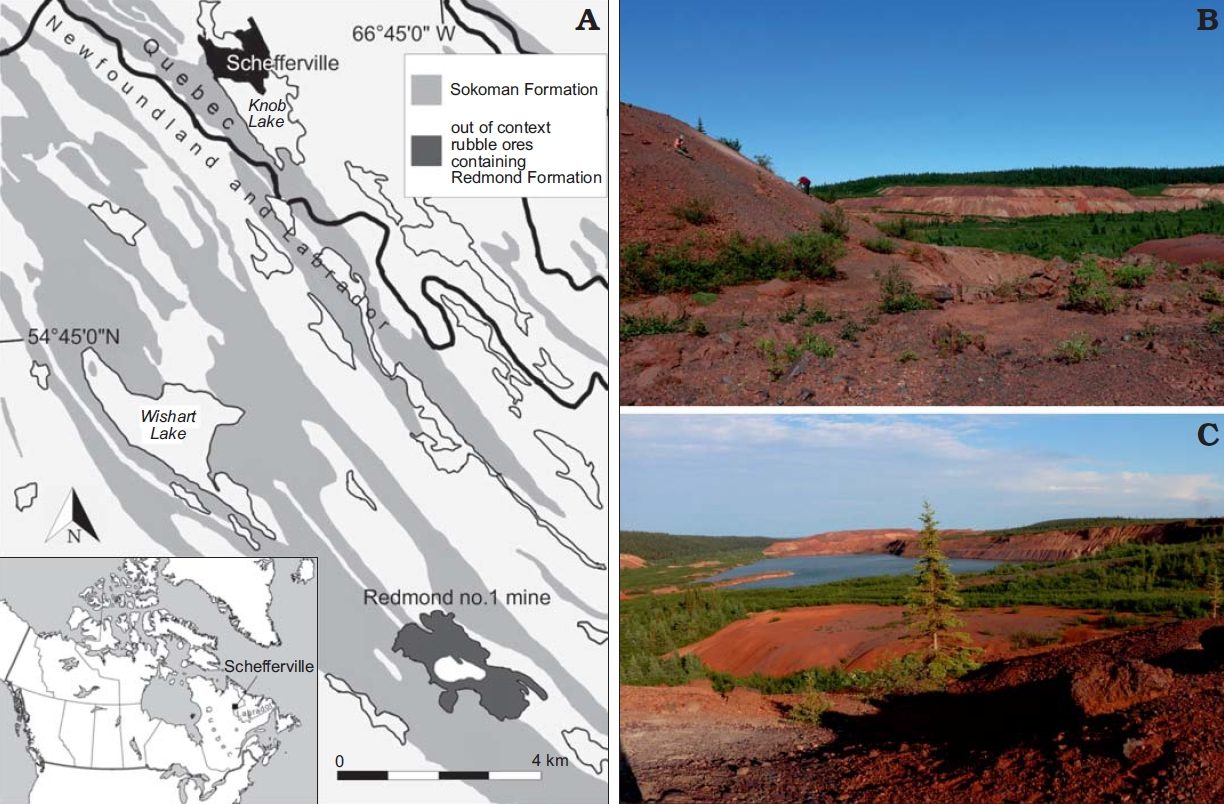
- Geologic map and outcrops of Redmond Formation
- Type: Formation
- Underlies: Glacial deposits
- Overlies: Sokoman Formation
- Thickness: Up to 1.5 m (4.9 ft)

Lithology
- Primary: Argillite

Location
- Coordinates: 54.7°N 66.8°W
- Approximate paleocoordinates: 46.4°N 27.3°W
- Region: Newfoundland and Labrador
- Country: Canada
- Extent: Redmond Basin

Type section
- Named for: Redmond No. 1 mine
- Redmond Formation (Canada)

The Redmond Formation is a geologic formation in Newfoundland and Labrador. It preserves fossils dating back to the mid-Cretaceous (Cenomanian). It was a thin (up to 1.5 metres (4.9 ft) thick) and restricted unit traced for 152 metres (499 ft) in a single mine (Redmond No. 1) in Labrador, overlying Paleoproterozoic rocks, with large amounts of rubble, probably as a result of graben subsidence within the Labrador Trough. Argillite facies within the formation have produced a diverse flora and insect assemblage.

== Fossil content ==
=== Animals ===
==== Mesoraphidiidae ====
- Alloraphidia dorfi

==== Ephemeroptera ====
- Alatuscapillus icarus
- Cruscolli sheppardae
- Protoligoneuria borealis

==== Palaeoleontidae ====
- Palaeoleon ferrogeneticus

==== Susumaniidae ====
- Palaeopteron complexum

==== Coleoptera ====
- Coleoptera indet.

==== Labradorocoleidae ====
- Labradorocoleus carpenteri

==== Cupedidae ====
- Cupedidae indet.
- Haliplidae indet.
- Peltodytes sp.

==== Tettigarctidae ====
- Maculaferrum blaisi

==== Dictyoptera ====
- Cretatermes carpenteri
- Labradormantis guilbaulti

=== Plants ===
- Andromeda sp.
  - A. novaecaesarae
  - A. parlatorii
- ‘Aralia’ groenlandica
- Araliopsoides cretacea
- Celastrophyllum sp.
  - C. albaedomus
  - C. brittonianum
- Cissites sp.
- Crassidenticulum sp.
- Daphnophyllum dakotense
- ‘Densinervum’ kauli
- Dicotylophyllum sp.
- Diospyros primaeva
- Dryandroides lanceolata
- Dryandroides sp.
- Ficus berthoudi
- Liriodendron simplex
- Liriodendropsis simplex
- Magnolia
  - Magnolia sp.
  - Magnolia amplifolia
- Menispermites sp.
  - M. obtusiloba
  - M. trilobatus
- Platanus sp.
  - P. heerii
  - P. shirleyensis
- Salix newberryana
- Sassafras acutilobum
- ‘Sterculia’ lugubris

== See also ==
- List of fossiliferous stratigraphic units in Newfoundland and Labrador
