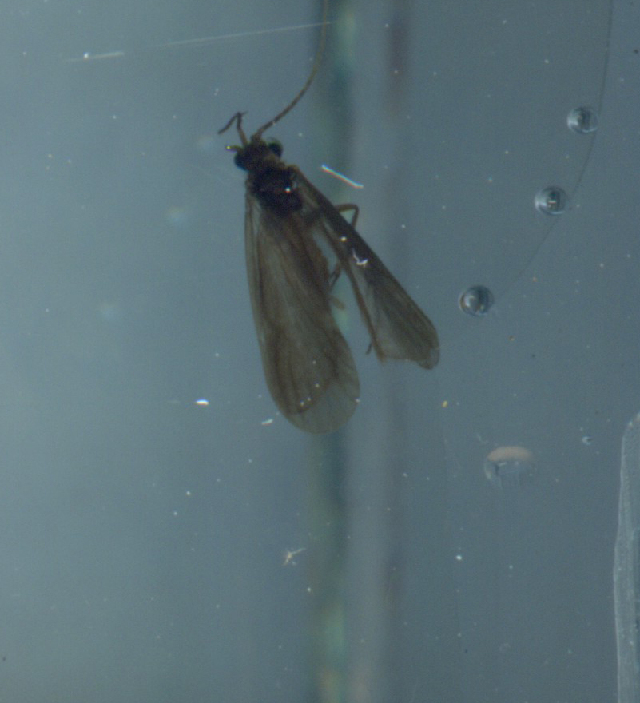
- Lype reducta

Scientific classification
- Kingdom: Animalia
- Phylum: Arthropoda
- Clade: Pancrustacea
- Class: Insecta
- Order: Trichoptera
- Family: Psychomyiidae
- Genus: Lype; McLachlan, 1878

= Lype =

Genus of caddisflies

Lype is a genus of net tube caddisflies in the family Psychomyiidae. There are more than 20 described species in Lype.

== Species ==
These 22 species belong to the genus Lype:

- Lype afra Mosely, 1939
- Lype atnia Malicky & Chantaramongkol, 1993
- Lype auripilis McLachlan, 1884
- Lype daurica Ivanov & Levanidova in Arefina, Ivanov & Levanidova, 1996
- Lype dhumravarna Schmid, 1972
- Lype diversa (Banks, 1914)
- Lype excisa Mey, 1991
- Lype flavospinosa Mosely, 1930
- Lype formosana
- Lype lubaretsi
- Lype nitida Statzner, 1976
- Lype phaeopa (Stephens, 1836)
- Lype reducta (Hagen, 1868)
- Lype saxonica Mey, 1985
- Lype sinuata McLachlan, 1878
- Lype tipmanee Chantaramongkol & Malicky, 1986
- Lype vietnamella Mey, 1996
- † Lype essentia Melnitsky & Ivanov, 2013
- † Lype eximia Ulmer, 1912
- † Lype prolongata Ulmer, 1912
- † Lype recta Mey, 1988
- † Psychomyia sericea (Pictet & Hagen, 1856)
