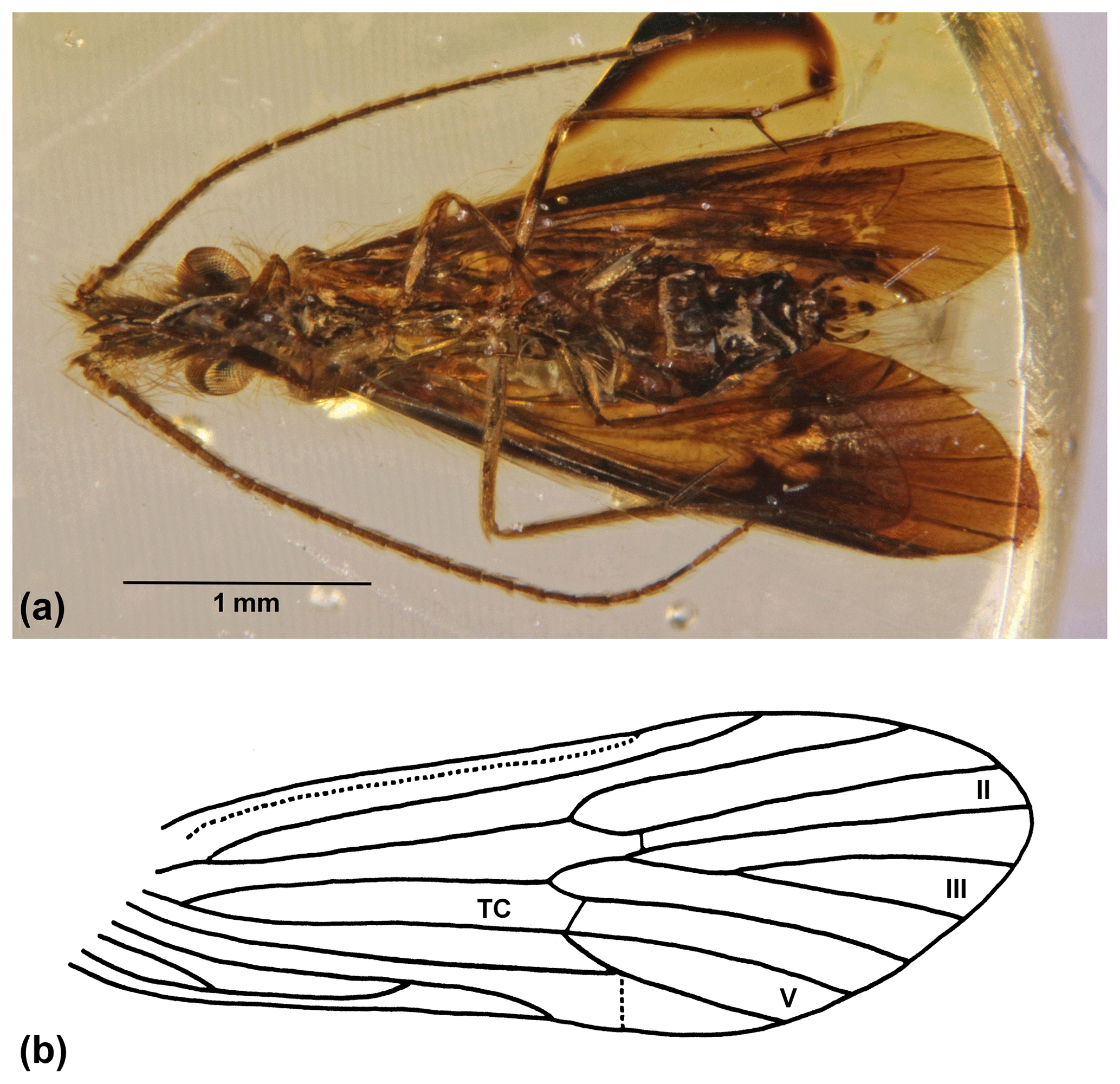
- Specimen of Cretapsyche palpinova

Scientific classification
- Kingdom: Animalia
- Phylum: Arthropoda
- Clade: Pancrustacea
- Class: Insecta
- Order: Trichoptera
- Superfamily: Sericostomatoidea
- Family: †Dysoneuridae; Sukatsheva, 1968

Genera
- †Burmapsyche; †Cretapsyche; †Dysoneura; †Khasurtia; †Palaeoludus; †Prochita; †Utania

= Dysoneuridae =

Dysoneuridae Temporal range: Middle Jurassic–Cenomanian

Extinct family of caddisflies

Dysoneuridae is an extinct family of insect in the order Trichoptera, the caddisflies. The family was first described by I.D. Sukacheva (also spelled Sukatsheva) in 1968, and lived from the Middle Jurassic to mid-Cretaceous.

In Wichard et al. (2018), the family is placed in the suborder Integripalpia, in the superfamily Sericostomatoidea.

== Genera ==
Dysoneuridae contains the following genera:

- †Burmapsyche Wichard et al., 2018 Burmese amber, Myanmar, Late Cretaceous (Cenomanian)
  - †Burmapsyche comosa Wichard et al., 2018
  - †Burmapsyche palpsfurcata Wichard et al., 2018
- †Cretapsyche Wichard et al., 2018 Burmese amber, Myanmar, Cenomanian
  - †Cretapsyche circula Wichard et al., 2018
  - †Cretapsyche elegans Wichard et al., 2018
  - †Cretapsyche insueta Wichard et al., 2018
- †Dysoneura Sukatsheva, 1968
  - †Dysoneura trifurcata Sukacheva 1968 Karabastau Formation, Kazakhstan, Late Jurassic
  - †Dysoneura zherikhini Sukatsheva and Vassilenko 2013 Khaya Formation, Russia, Late Jurassic (Tithonian)
- †Khasurtia Sukatsheva & Vasilenko, 2019 Khasurty locality, Russia, Early Cretaceous (Aptian)
  - †Khasurtia alexeii Sukatsheva & Vasilenko, 2019
  - †Khasurtia kopylovi Sukatsheva & Vasilenko, 2019
  - †Khasurtia lukashevichae Sukatsheva & Vasilenko, 2019
- †Palaeoludus Sukatsheva & Jarzembowski, 2001
  - †Palaeoludus popovi Sukatsheva and Jarzembowski 2001 Durlston Formation, United Kingdom, Early Cretaceous (Berriasian)
- †Prochita Sukatsheva & Vassilenko, 2013
  - †Prochita rasnitsyni Sukatsheva and Vassilenko 2013 Doronino Formation, Russia, Early Cretaceous (Barremian)
- †Utania Sukatsheva, 1982
  - †Utania defecta Sukatsheva, 1982 Utan Formation, Russia, Early Cretaceous (Hauterivian)
  - †Utania remissa Sukatsheva, 1990 Glushkovo Formation, Russia, Tithonian

†Liadotaulius Handlirsch, 1939 (including Oncovena Novokshonov & Sukatsheva, 1995) previously was included in this family, but recently has been placed in Philopotamidae.
