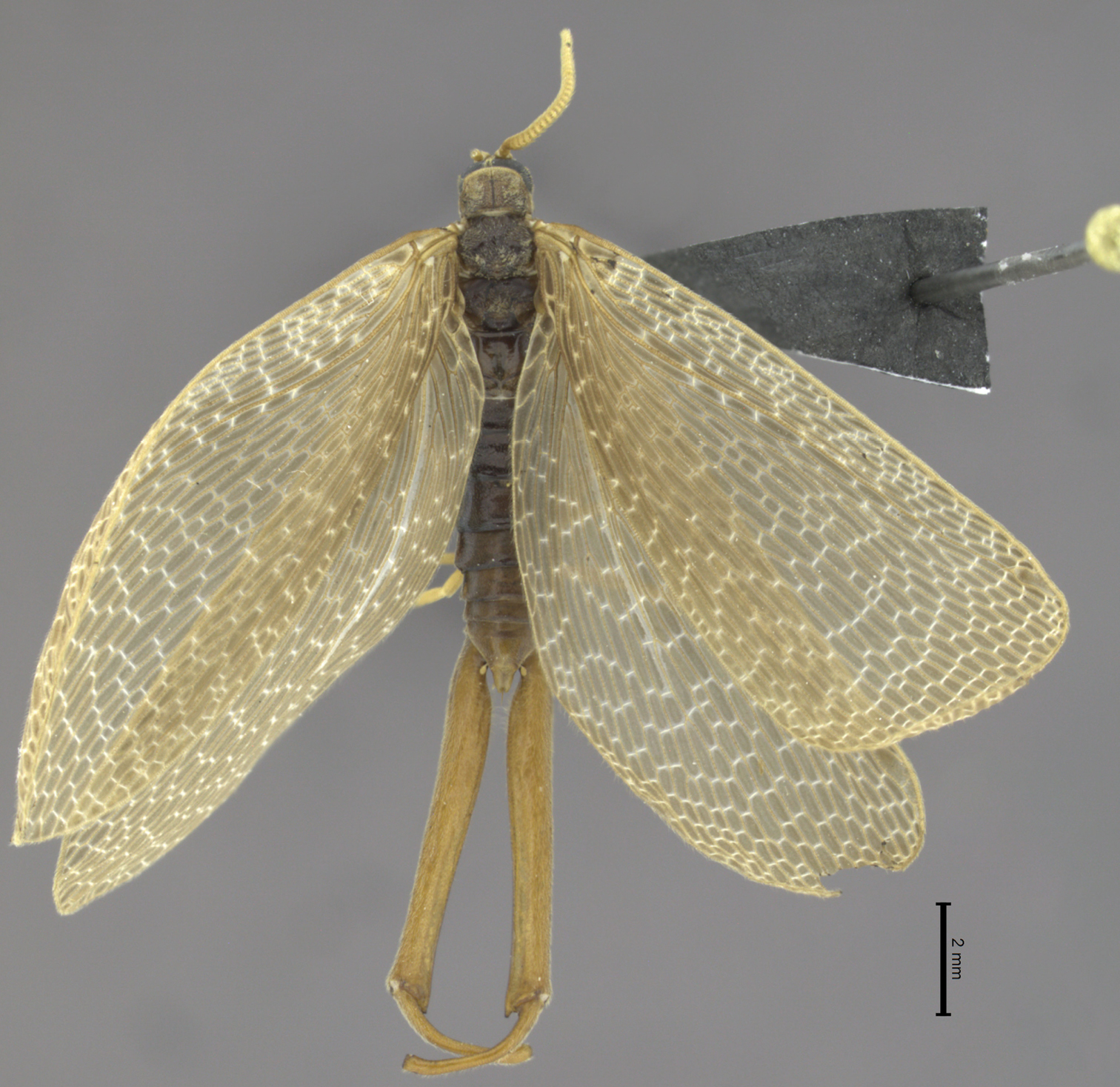

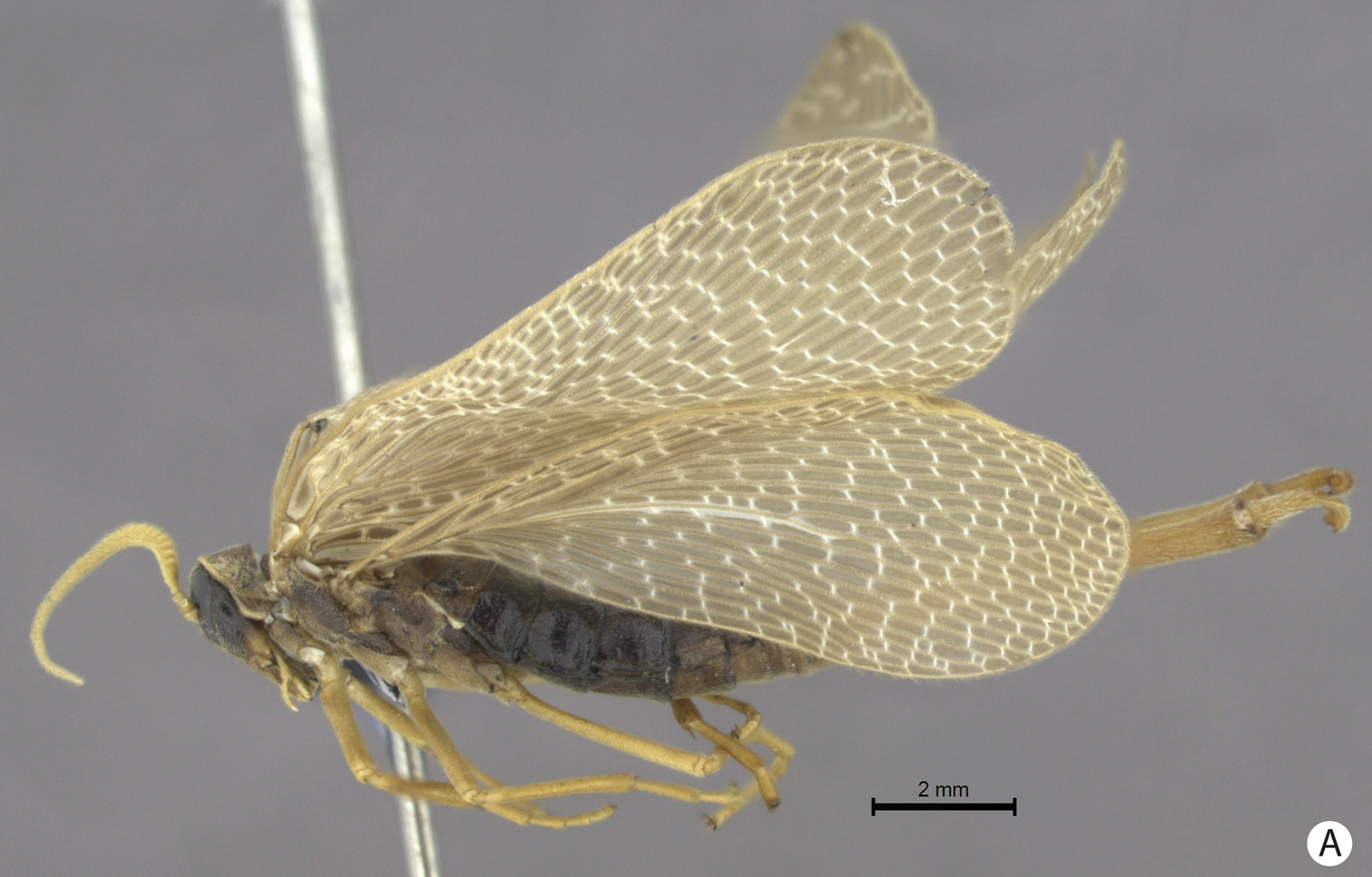

Scientific classification
- Domain: Eukaryota
- Kingdom: Animalia
- Phylum: Arthropoda
- Class: Insecta
- Order: Mecoptera
- Family: Meropeidae
- Genus: Austromerope
- Species: A. brasiliensis

Binomial name
- Austromerope brasiliensis Machado et al., 2013

= Austromerope brasiliensis =

Species of insect

Austromerope brasiliensis is one of only two living representatives of the genus Austromerope (the other is the Australian Austromerope poultoni). It is apparently endemic to Brazil, with large forceps-like structures at the tail and two pairs of wings. Only adults are known - no larval stage has been seen.
