= Psychomyia =

Scientific classification
- Kingdom: Animalia
- Phylum: Arthropoda
- Clade: Pancrustacea
- Class: Insecta
- Order: Trichoptera
- Family: Psychomyiidae
- Genus: Psychomyia; Latreille, 1829

Genus of insects

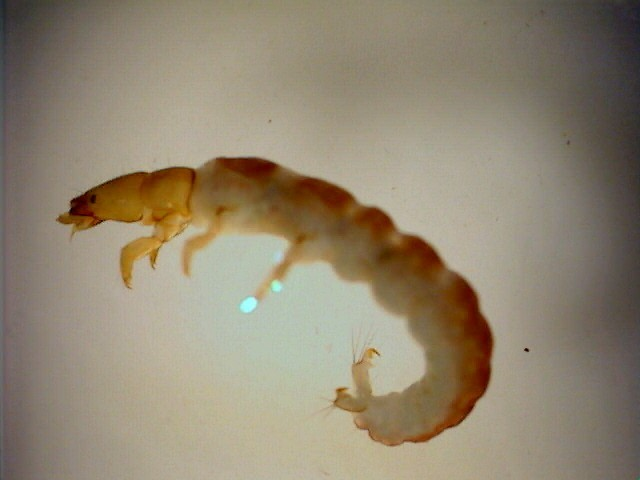

Psychomyia is a genus of insects belonging to the family Psychomyiidae.

The genus has almost cosmopolitan distribution.

Species:

- Psychomyia adun Malicky & Chantaramongkol, 1993
- Psychomyia aigina Malicky, 1997
