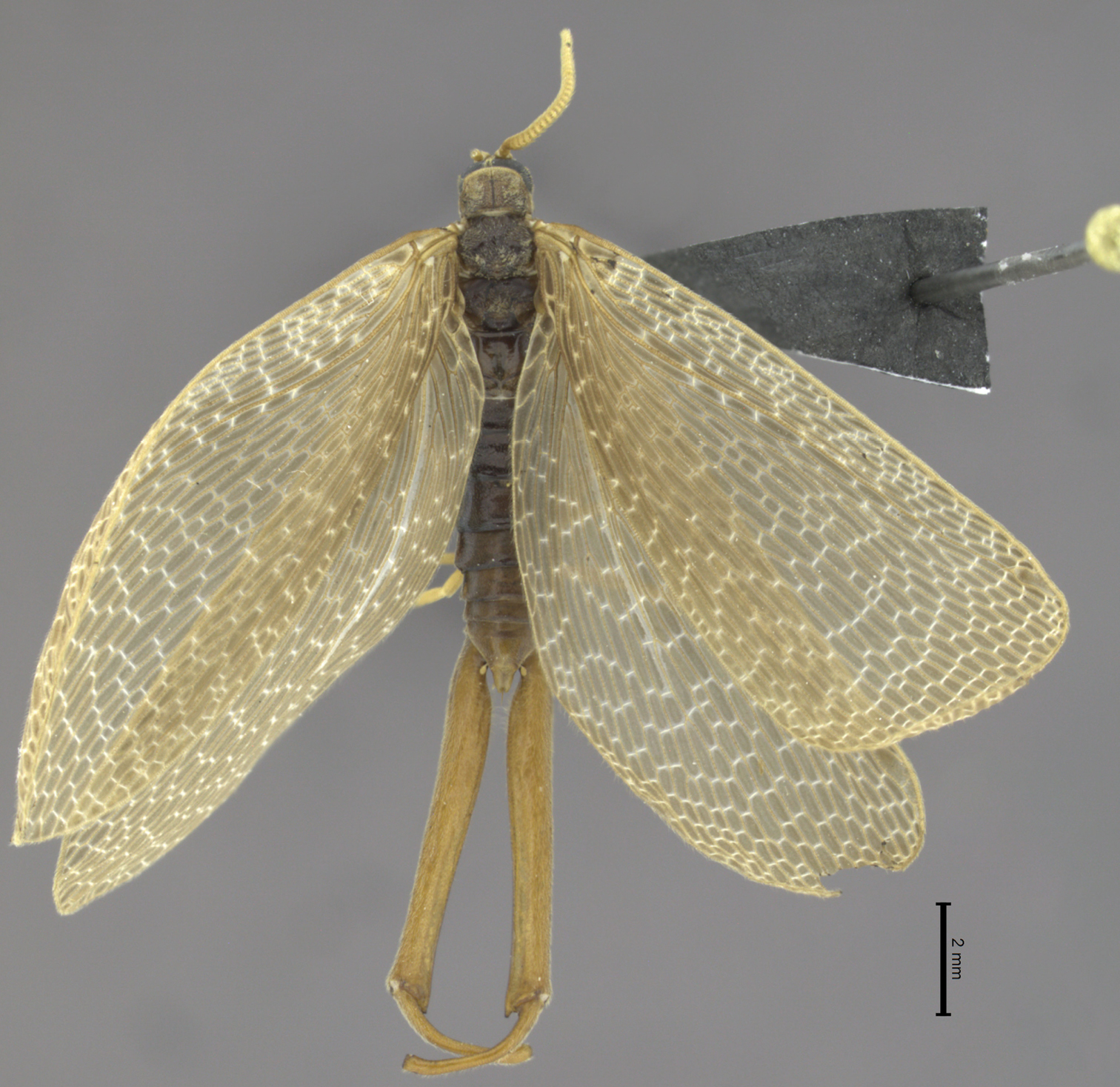
- Austromerope brasiliensis
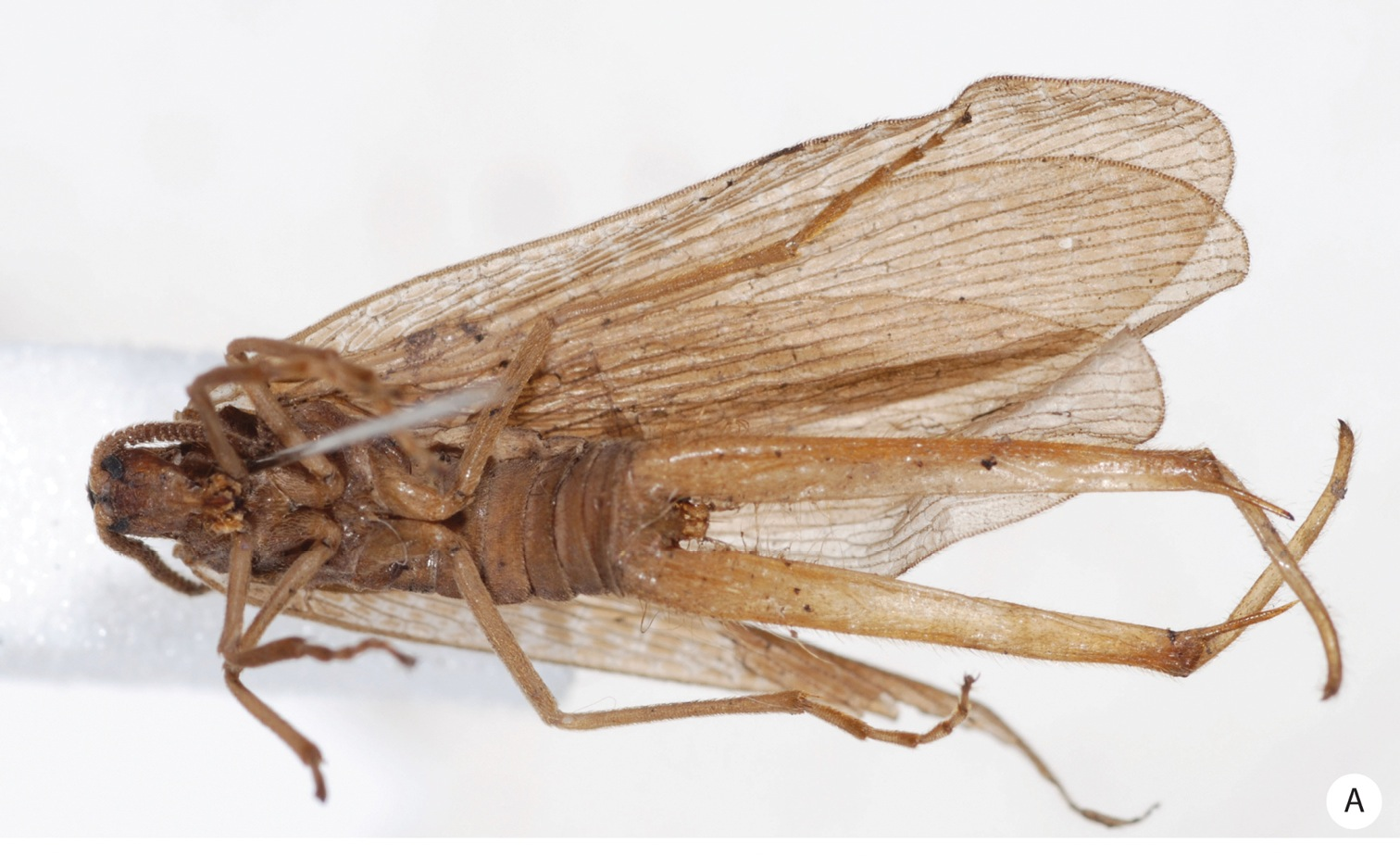
- Austromerope poultoni

Scientific classification
- Domain: Eukaryota
- Kingdom: Animalia
- Phylum: Arthropoda
- Class: Insecta
- Order: Mecoptera
- Family: Meropeidae
- Genus: Austromerope; Killington, 1933

Species
- Austromerope brasiliensis; Austromerope poultoni

= Austromerope =

Genus of insects

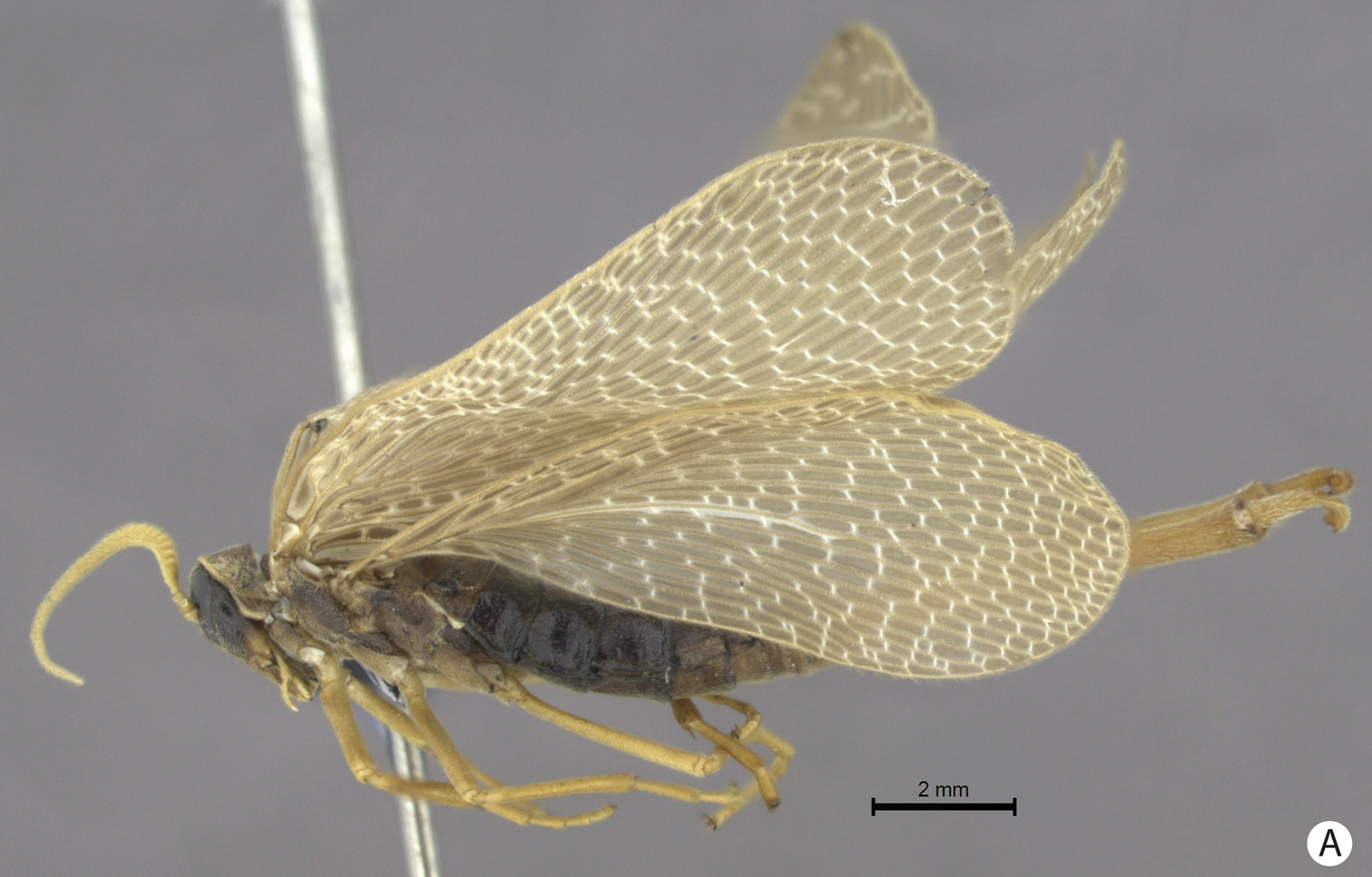
A. brasiliensis lateral view

Austromerope is a genus of forcepfly which contains only two known species, Austromerope poultoni from Western Australia, and the South American Austromerope brasiliensis. They are small scorpionflies, with large forceps-like structures at the tail and two pairs of wings. Only adults and eggs from captured adults are known - no larval stage has been seen. Much of the biology of these insects is not known, due to their secretiveness and rarity.
