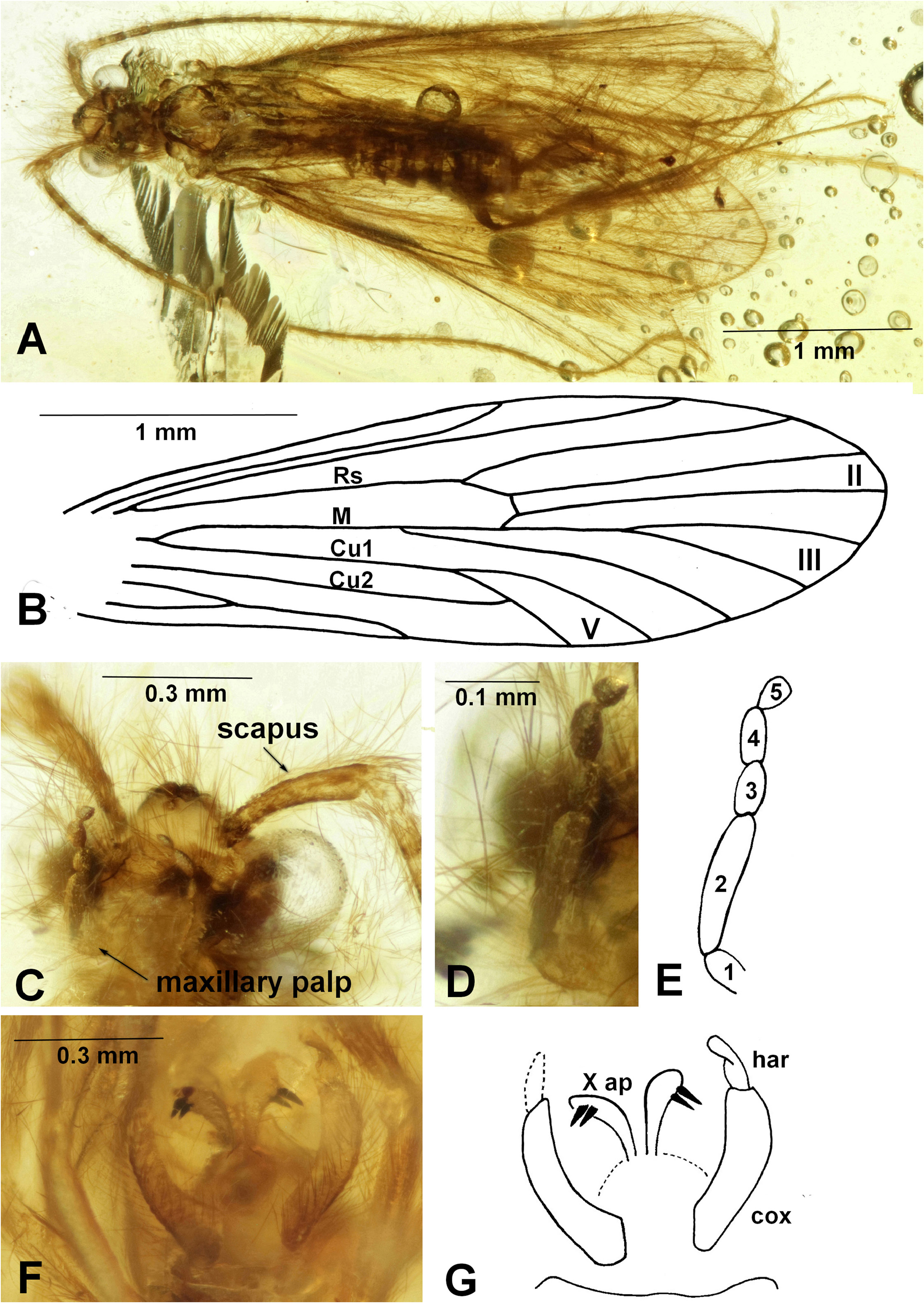
- Cretapsyche myanmari

Scientific classification
- Kingdom: Animalia
- Phylum: Arthropoda
- Clade: Pancrustacea
- Class: Insecta
- Order: Trichoptera
- Family: †Dysoneuridae
- Genus: †Cretapsyche; Wichard et al., 2018

Species
- †Cretapsyche circula Wichard et al., 2018; †Cretapsyche elegans Wichard et al., 2018; †Cretapsyche insueta Wichard et al., 2018

= Cretapsyche =

Cretapsyche Temporal range: Cenomanian, 100.5–93.9 Ma

Extinct genus of caddisflies

Cretapsyche is an extinct genus of caddisflies in the extinct family Dysoneuridae. It is from the Late Cretaceous (Cenomanian) and specimens are from Burmese amber.

The genus includes the three species C. circula, C. elegans and C. insueta.

== See also ==
- 2018 in arthropod paleontology
