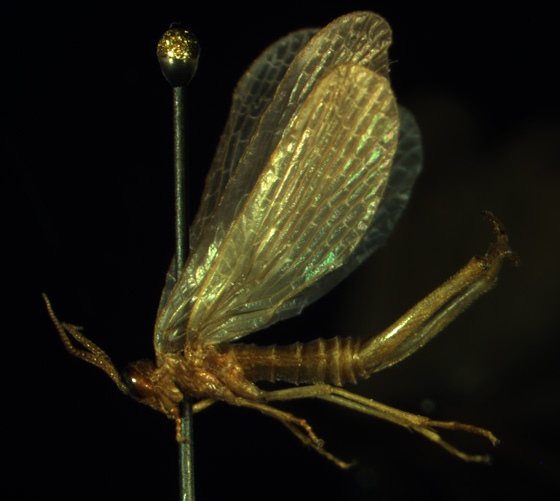
- Merope tuber
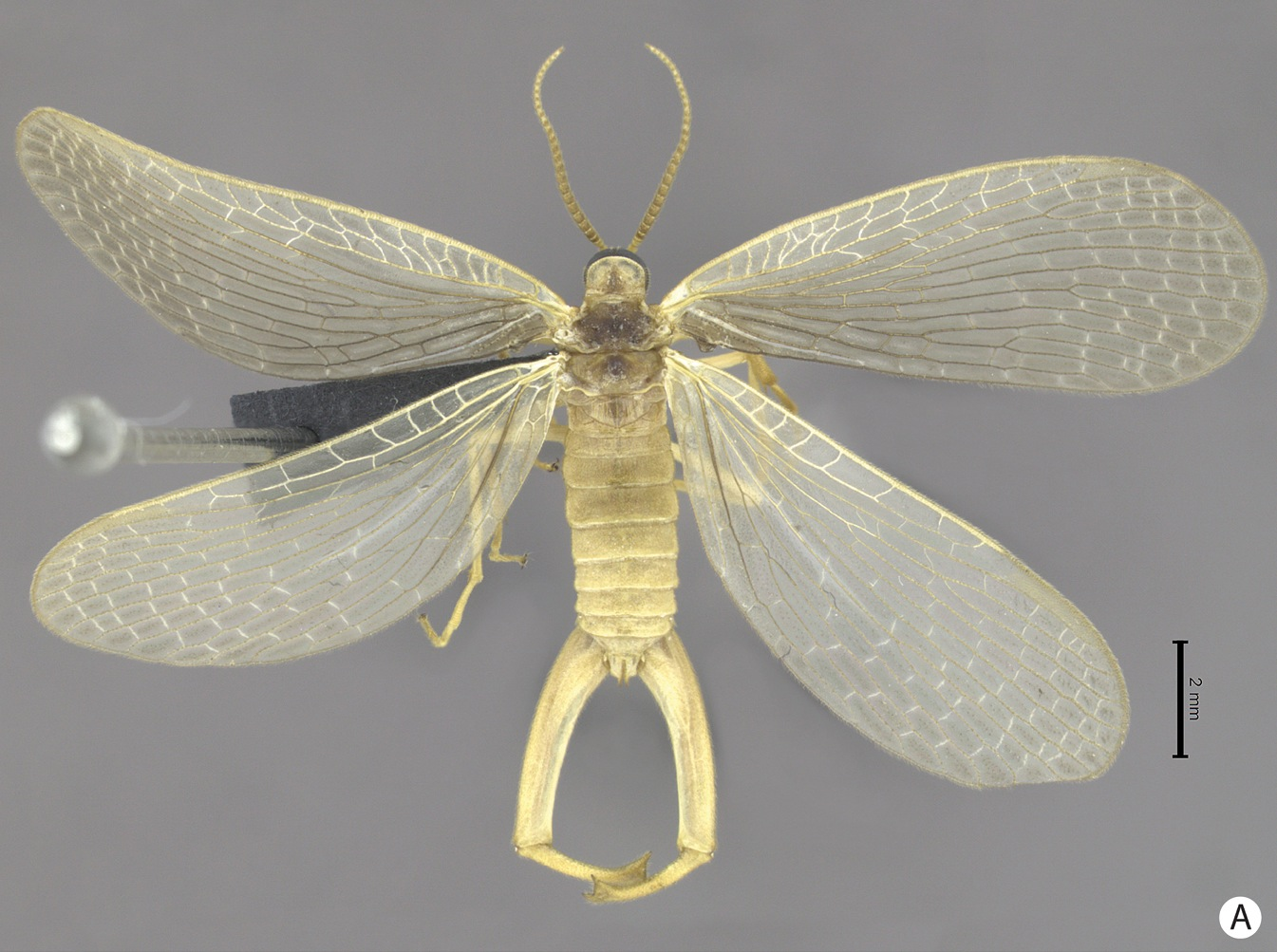
- Dorsal view

Scientific classification
- Kingdom: Animalia
- Phylum: Arthropoda
- Clade: Pancrustacea
- Class: Insecta
- Order: Mecoptera
- Family: Meropeidae
- Genus: Merope; Newman, 1838
- Species: M. tuber

Binomial name
- Merope tuber Newman, 1838

= Merope tuber =

Species of insect

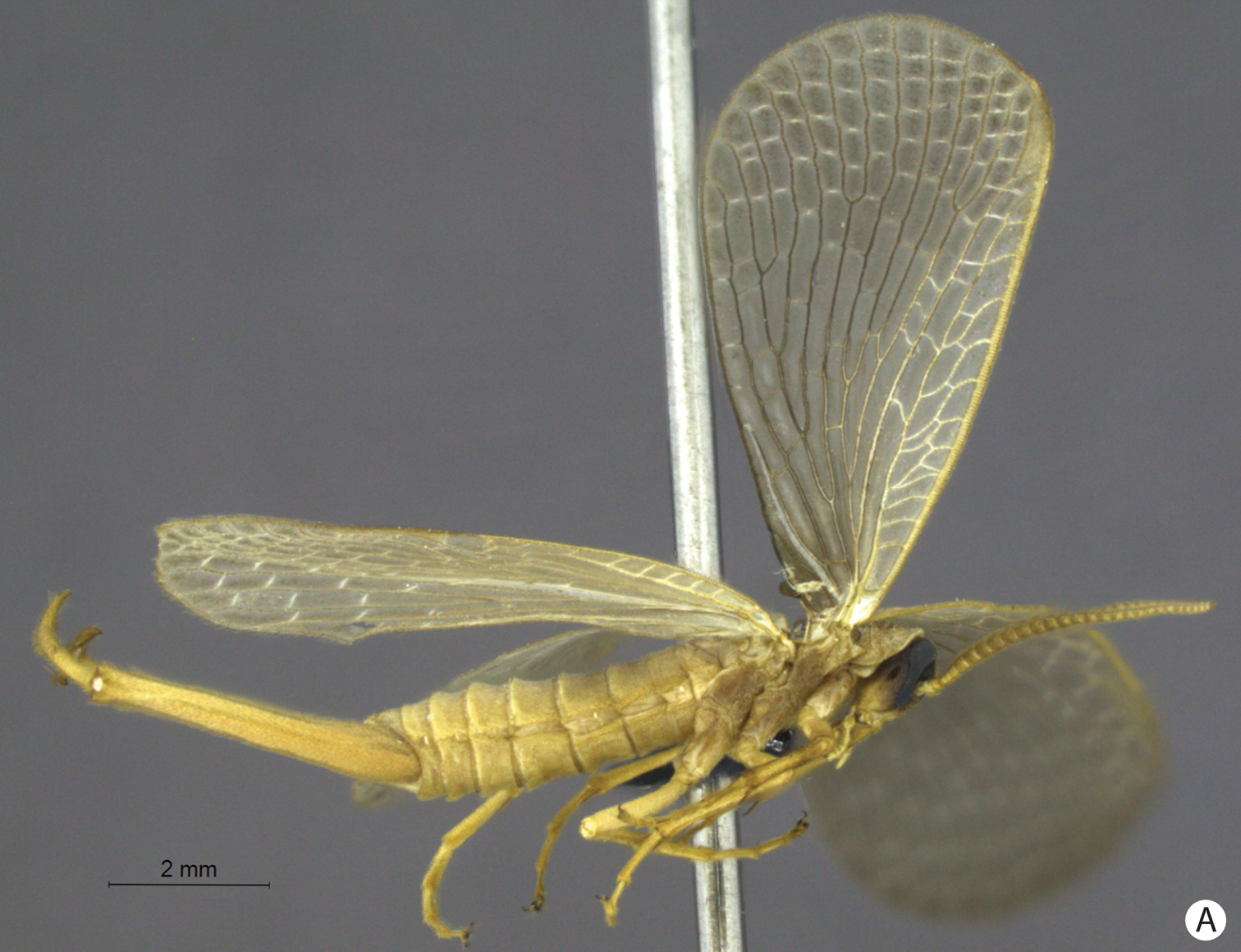
Lateral view

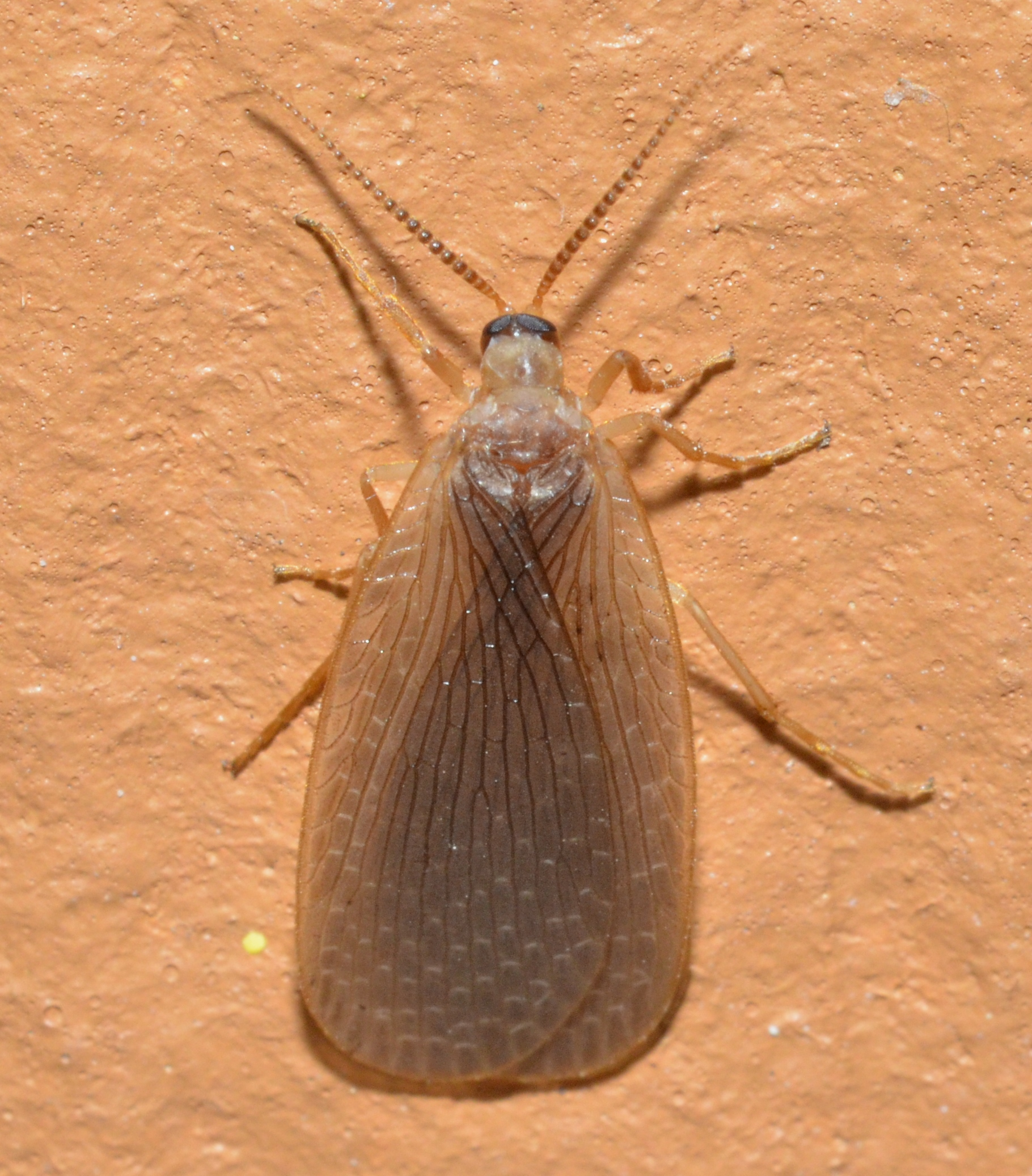

Merope tuber, the earwigfly or forcepfly, is the only species in the genus Merope, and the only living member of the family Meropeidae in North America. It occurs throughout the east from Ontario to Georgia, and west to Kansas. Recently the insect has also been found in Florida. This insect's most distinguishing feature is the large genital forceps on the male abdomen which resembles the cerci of earwigs. Much is unknown about the adults, which are nocturnal and secretive, sometimes found under logs or in malaise traps near streams, or attracted to lights at nighttime. No M. tuber or Meropeid larvae have been identified. The insect is characterized by long wings with many veins and no ocelli. There is a region of interlocking sclerites that holds the jugum and scutellum on the middle thoracic segment together. This may be used to keep the wings together when pushing up through dirt. A similar apparatus is found in cicadas and ground-dwelling beetles, so it may be that the winged adults dig in soil. The flat appearance of the insect suggests that the insect dwells close to the ground in fissures and other small ground openings, as does the lack of ocelli.
