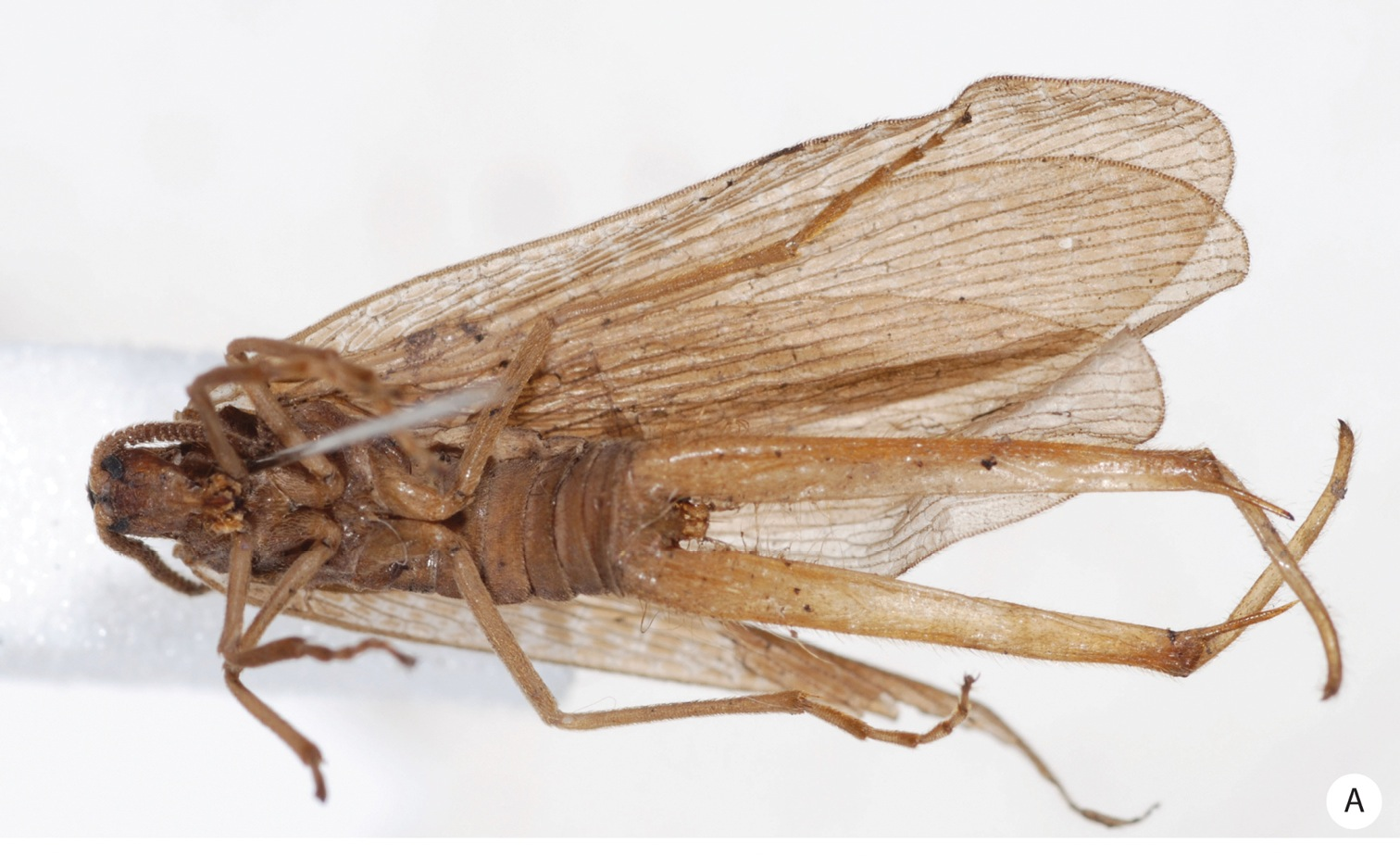

Scientific classification
- Kingdom: Animalia
- Phylum: Arthropoda
- Clade: Pancrustacea
- Class: Insecta
- Order: Mecoptera
- Family: Meropeidae
- Genus: Austromerope
- Species: A. poultoni

Binomial name
- Austromerope poultoni Killington, 1933

= Austromerope poultoni =

Species of insect

Austromerope poultoni is one of only two representatives of the genus Austromerope (the other is the South American Austromerope brasiliensis), and the only member of the family Meropeidae in the Eastern Hemisphere. It is endemic to Western Australia, typically around 20mm long, with large forceps-like structures at the tail and two pairs of wings. Only adults and eggs from captured adults are known – no larval stage has been seen. It is found in a variety of habitats, including woodland, jarrah forest, and sand plain vegetation.
