= Palaeoludus =

Palaeoludus Temporal range: Berriasian

Scientific classification
- Kingdom: Animalia
- Phylum: Arthropoda
- Clade: Pancrustacea
- Class: Insecta
- Order: Trichoptera
- Family: †Dysoneuridae
- Genus: †Palaeoludus; Sukatsheva & Jarzembowski, 2001
- Species: †P. popovi

Binomial name
- †Palaeoludus popovi Sukatsheva & Jarzembowski, 2001

Extinct genus of caddisflies

Palaeoludus is an extinct genus of caddisflies in the family Dysoneuridae. It contains only one species, Palaeoludus popovi. The genus is known from the lower Cretaceous of southern England.
