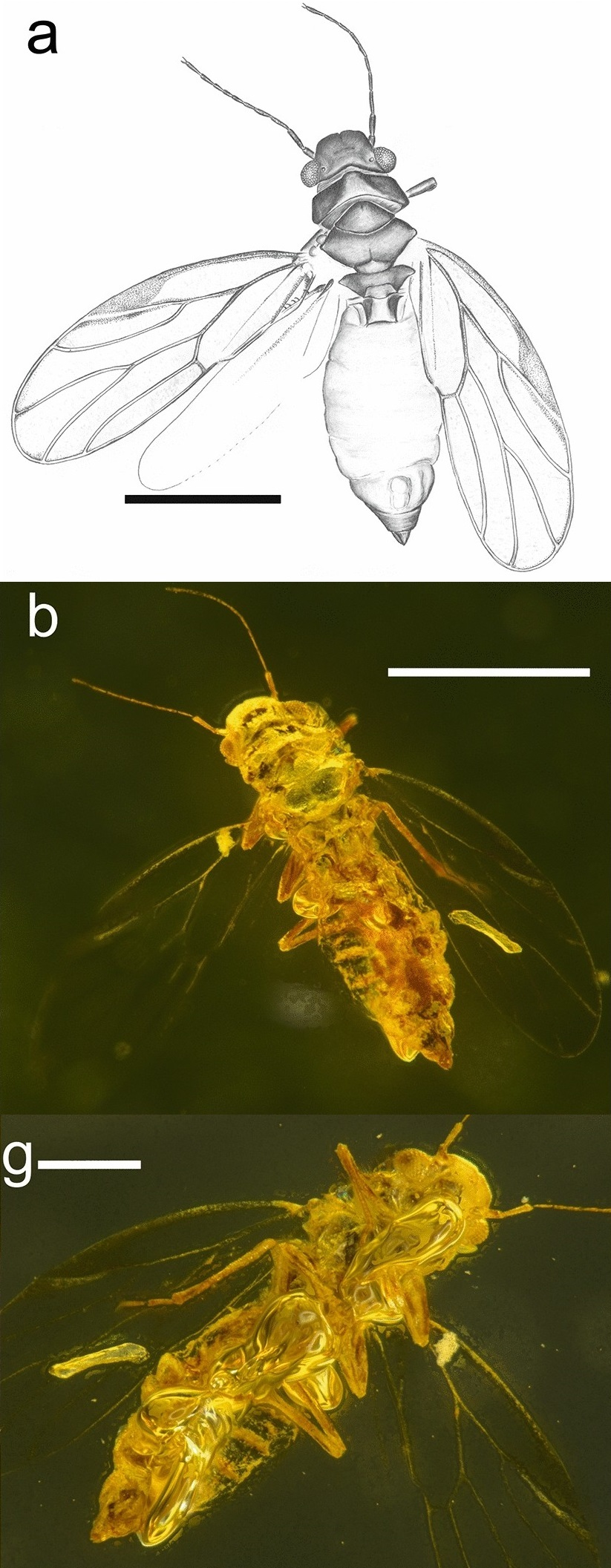
- Holotype of Amecephala pusilla

Scientific classification
- Kingdom: Animalia
- Phylum: Arthropoda
- Clade: Pancrustacea
- Class: Insecta
- Order: Hemiptera
- Suborder: Sternorrhyncha
- Superfamily: Psylloidea
- Family: †Liadopsyllidae; Martynov, 1926

Genera
- See text

= Liadopsyllidae =

Liadopsyllidae Temporal range: Toarcian–Turonian

Extinct family of insects

Liadopsyllidae is an extinct family of hemipteran insects belonging to Psylloidea ranging from the Early Jurassic to Upper Cretaceous. The family was named by Andrey Vasilyevich Martynov in 1926. They are the earliest known members of Psylloidea, with modern members of the group not known until the Paleogene, as such, they have been suggested to be a paraphyletic assemblage ancestral to modern psylloids. The family Malmopsyllidae has been subsumed into this family, but is considered distinct by some authors.

== Taxonomy ==
Taxonomy after after

- Liadopsylla Handlirsch, 1921
  - Liadopsylla geinitzi Handlirsch, 1921 Green Series, Germany, Early Jurassic (Toarcian)
  - Liadopsylla obtusa Ansorge, 1996 Green Series, Germany, Early Jurassic (Toarcian)
  - Liadopsylla asiatica Becker-Migdisova, 1985 Karabastau Formation, Kazakhstan, Late Jurassic (Oxfordian)
  - Liadopsylla brevifurcata Becker-Migdisova, 1985 Karabastau Formation, Kazakhstan, Late Jurassic (Oxfordian)
  - Liadopsylla grandis Becker-Migdisova, 1985 Karabastau Formation, Kazakhstan, Late Jurassic (Oxfordian)
  - Liadopsylla karatavica Becker-Migdisova, 1985 Karabastau Formation, Kazakhstan, Late Jurassic (Oxfordian)
  - Liadopsylla longiforceps Becker-Migdisova, 1985—Karabastau Formation, Kazakhstan, Late Jurassic (Oxfordian)
  - Liadopsylla tenuicornis Martynov, 1926—Karabastau Formation, Kazakhstan, Late Jurassic (Oxfordian)
  - Liadopsylla turkestanica Becker-Migdisova, 1949—Karabastau Formation, Kazakhstan, Late Jurassic (Oxfordian)
  - Liadopsylla apedetica Ouvrard, Burckhardt et Azar, 2010 Lebanese amber, Early Cretaceous (Barremian)
  - Liadopsylla mongolica Shcherbakov, 1988— Dzun-Bain Formation, Mongolia Early Cretaceous (Aptian)
  - Liadopsylla lautereri (Shcherbakov, 2020)—Khasurty locality, Buryatia, Russia, Early Cretaceous (Aptian)
  - Liadopsylla loginovae (Shcherbakov, 2020)—Khasurty locality, Buryatia, Russia, Early Cretaceous (Aptian)
  - Liadopsylla hesperia Ouvrard et Burckhardt, 2010—New Jersey amber, USA, Late Cretaceous (Turonian)
- Gracilinervia Becker-Migdisova, 1985
  - Gracilinervia mastimatoides Becker-Migdisova, 1985—Karabastau Formation, Kazakhstan, Late Jurassic (Oxfordian)
- Malmopsylla Becker- Migdisova, 1985
  - Malmopsylla karatavica Becker- Migdisova, 1985 – Karabastau Formation, Kazakhstan, Late Jurassic (Oxfordian)
- Neopsylloides Becker-Migdisova, 1985
  - Neopsylloides turutanovae Becker-Migdisova, 1985—Karabastau Formation, Kazakhstan, Late Jurassic (Oxfordian)
- Pauropsylloides Becker-Migdisova, 1985
  - Pauropsylloides jurassica Becker-Migdisova, 1985—Karabastau Formation, Kazakhstan, Late Jurassic (Oxfordian)
- Stigmapsylla Shcherbakov, 2020
  - Stigmapsylla klimaszewskii Shcherbakov, 2020—Khasurty locality, Buryatia, Russia, Early Cretaceous (Aptian)
- Mirala Burckhardt & Poinar, 2019
  - Mirala burmanica Burckhardt et Poinar, 2019—Burmese amber, Myanmar, mid-Cretaceous (Albian to Cenomanian)
- Amecephala Drohojowska et al. 2020
  - Amecephala pusilla Drohojowska et al. 2020— Burmese amber, Myanmar, mid-Cretaceous (Albian to Cenomanian)
- Burmala Lou et al. 2021
  - Burmala liaoyaoi Lou et al. 2021 — Burmese amber, Myanmar, mid-Cretaceous (Albian to Cenomanian)
