= Aclistophasma =

Aclistophasma Temporal range: Middle Jurassic

Scientific classification
- Kingdom: Animalia
- Phylum: Arthropoda
- Clade: Pancrustacea
- Class: Insecta
- Order: Phasmatodea
- Family: †Susumaniidae
- Subfamily: †Aclistophasmatinae
- Genus: †Aclistophasma; Yang et al., 2021
- Species: †A. echinulatum

Binomial name
- †Aclistophasma echinulatum Yang et al., 2021

Genus of extinct stick insect

Aclistophasma is an extinct genus of stick insect belonging to the superfamily Susumanioidea. Aclistophasma echinulatum is the only species discovered to be in this genus. It lived during the Middle Jurassic period in the Jiulongshan Formation of China. This species had numerous anti-predator defensive such as spines that showed the early evolution of anti-predator defenses in stick insects.

The generic name is a combination of the Greek "aklystos" which means sheltered, hidden or safe, "aclist-" which means crypsis and "phasma" (stem of the order name Phasmatodea) meaning spirit. The species name is from the Latin word "echinulatus" which means "echinulate". The gender of the name is neuter.

== Taxonomy ==
It is a stick insect meaning that it belongs to the order Phasmatodea and specifically it is a part of the superfamily Susumanioidea. This genus is closely related to Adjacivena which together make up the subfamily Aclistophasmatinae. The subfamily is in the family Susumaniidae diverging from them along with Neophasmatodea during the Jurassic–Early Cretaceous period during the Cretaceous Terrestrial Revolution.

== Description ==
The entire length of the body, excluding its antenna, is around 56.18 millimeters long with its antenna being 5.64 millimeters long. Its head is an ovoid shape with the antenna being threat-like. The abdomen is distinctly narrower than thorax and is segmented into 10 segments. The entire body of Aclistophasma is covered in numerous setae, extensions and femoral spines. These clearly show that this species had early defensive strategies against predators. It also had large fore and hind wings.

The holotype specimen of Aclistophasma is CNU-PHA-NN2019006. It was discovered in the Daohugou Beds of the Jiulongshan Formation in northeastern China. The fossil is relatively complete with preserved complete wings, the fore, middle and hind legs however are incompletely preserved.
