= Tsakir =

Tsakir Цакир
- Selo
- Location within Republic of Buryatia Location within Russia
- Coordinates: 50°26′N 103°35′E
- Country: Russia
- Region: Republic of Buryatia
- District: Zakamensky District
- Time zone: UTC+8:00

Tsakir (Russian: Цакир; Buryat: Сахир, Sakhir) is a rural locality (a selo) in Zakamensky District, Republic of Buryatia, Russia. The population was 846 as of 2010. There are 17 streets.

== Geography ==
Tsakir is located 27 km northeast of Zakamensk (the district's administrative centre) by road. Ekhe-Tsakir is the nearest rural locality.

== Climate ==
Climate data for Tsakir (extremes 1936-present)
Month	Jan	Feb	Mar	Apr	May	Jun	Jul	Aug	Sep	Oct	Nov	Dec	Year
Record high °C (°F)	3.8 (38.8)	9.8 (49.6)	21.2 (70.2)	29.7 (85.5)	33.8 (92.8)	36.2 (97.2)	38.9 (102.0)	35.3 (95.5)	31.5 (88.7)	26.0 (78.8)	13.8 (56.8)	2.9 (37.2)	38.9 (102.0)
Mean daily maximum °C (°F)	−14.9 (5.2)	−6.7 (19.9)	3.0 (37.4)	12.1 (53.8)	19.0 (66.2)	23.8 (74.8)	24.9 (76.8)	22.7 (72.9)	17.1 (62.8)	8.6 (47.5)	−4.5 (23.9)	−14.4 (6.1)	7.6 (45.6)
Daily mean °C (°F)	−25.2 (−13.4)	−19.2 (−2.6)	−8.1 (17.4)	2.2 (36.0)	8.8 (47.8)	14.5 (58.1)	16.6 (61.9)	14.2 (57.6)	7.3 (45.1)	−1.7 (28.9)	−14.0 (6.8)	−23.3 (−9.9)	−2.3 (27.8)
Mean daily minimum °C (°F)	−32.4 (−26.3)	−28.8 (−19.8)	−17.6 (0.3)	−6.6 (20.1)	−0.9 (30.4)	6.2 (43.2)	9.9 (49.8)	8.4 (47.1)	0.3 (32.5)	−8.8 (16.2)	−20.9 (−5.6)	−29.6 (−21.3)	−10.1 (13.9)
Record low °C (°F)	−48.9 (−56.0)	−46.2 (−51.2)	−43.1 (−45.6)	−26.5 (−15.7)	−20.0 (−4.0)	−10.5 (13.1)	−6.9 (19.6)	−5.3 (22.5)	−13.8 (7.2)	−32.2 (−26.0)	−42.4 (−44.3)	−48.4 (−55.1)	−48.9 (−56.0)
Average precipitation mm (inches)	2.3 (0.09)	2.6 (0.10)	5.1 (0.20)	13.1 (0.52)	27.0 (1.06)	74.9 (2.95)	122.9 (4.84)	107.7 (4.24)	39.7 (1.56)	10.4 (0.41)	6.5 (0.26)	4.5 (0.18)	416.7 (16.41)
Source: pogoda.ru.net
