= Dysoneura =

Dysoneura Temporal range: Kimmeridgian–Tithonian

Scientific classification
- Kingdom: Animalia
- Phylum: Arthropoda
- Clade: Pancrustacea
- Class: Insecta
- Order: Trichoptera
- Family: †Dysoneuridae
- Genus: †Dysoneura; Sukatsheva, 1968

Type species
- †Dysoneura trifurcata Sukatsheva, 1968

Species
- †D. trifurcata; †D. zherikhini

Extinct genus of caddisflies

Dysoneura is an extinct genus of caddisflies, and the type genus of the family Dysoneuridae. The genus lived during the Jurassic period and is found in Russia and Kazakhstan.

== Species ==
The genus contains two species:

- †Dysoneura trifurcata Sukatsheva, 1968 – Kazakhstan
- †Dysoneura zherikhini Sukatsheva & Vassilenko, 2013 – Russia
