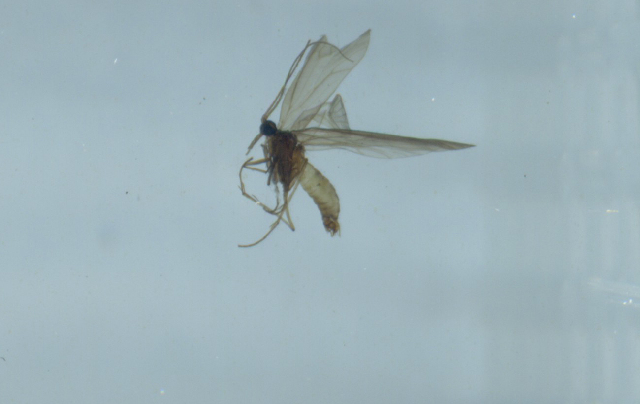
- Tinodes maclachlani

Scientific classification
- Kingdom: Animalia
- Phylum: Arthropoda
- Clade: Pancrustacea
- Class: Insecta
- Order: Trichoptera
- Family: Psychomyiidae
- Genus: Tinodes; Curtis, 1834

= Tinodes =

Genus of caddisflies

Tinodes is a genus of caddisflies belonging to the family Psychomyiidae.

The genus was first described by John Curtis in 1834.

The genus has cosmopolitan distribution.

Species:

- Tinodes aberrans Kimmins, 1962
- Tinodes waeneri
