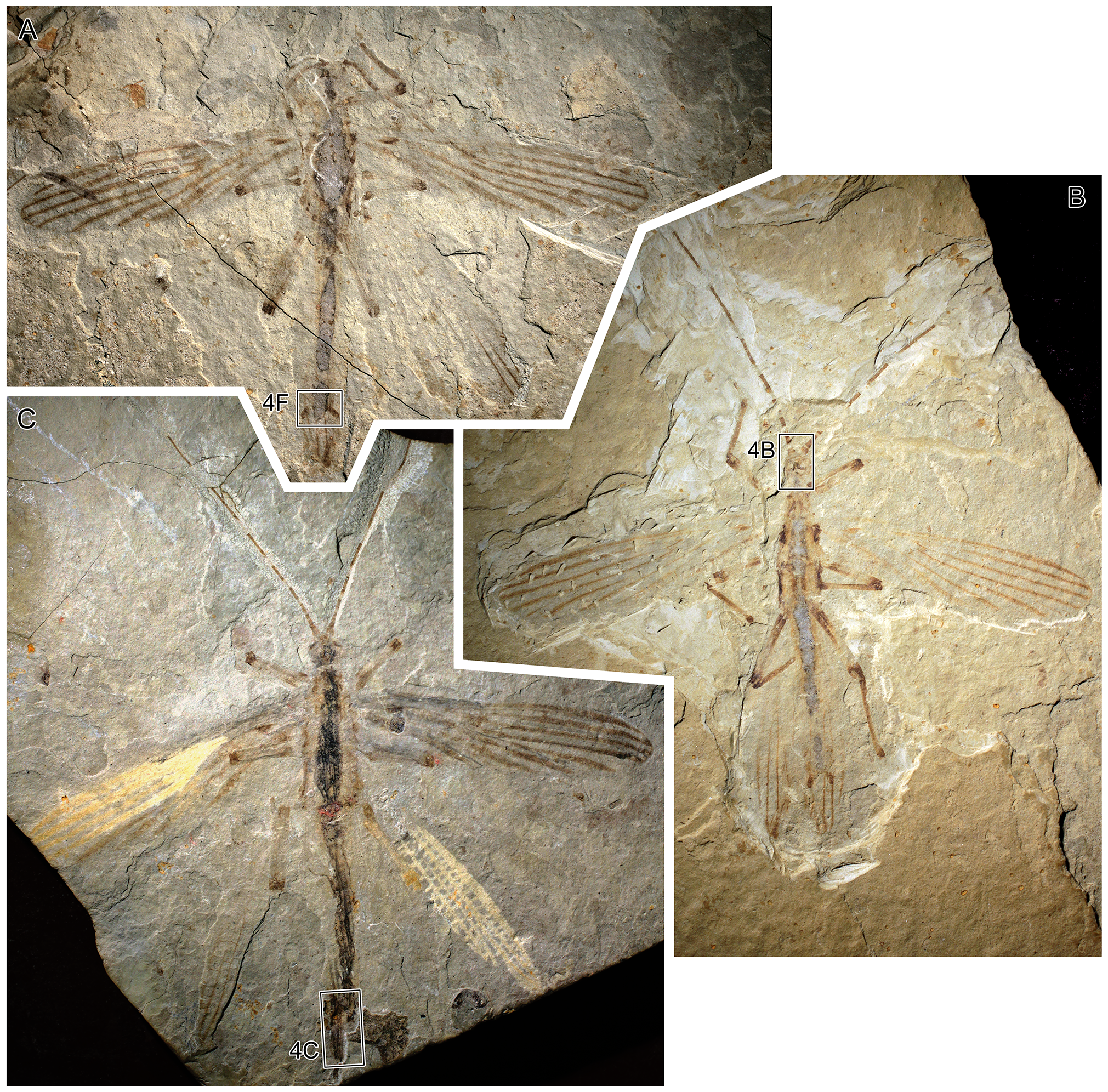
- Three specimens of Cretophasmomima melanogramma (two males and a female), including the holoype (B)

Scientific classification
- Kingdom: Animalia
- Phylum: Arthropoda
- Class: Insecta
- Order: Phasmatodea
- Family: †Susumaniidae
- Subfamily: †Susumaniinae
- Genus: †Cretophasmomima; Kuzmina, 1985

Type species
- †Cretophasmomima vitimica Kuzmina, 1985

= Cretophasmomima =

Cretophasmomima Temporal range: Cretaceous Barremian–Campanian

Extinct genus of stick insects

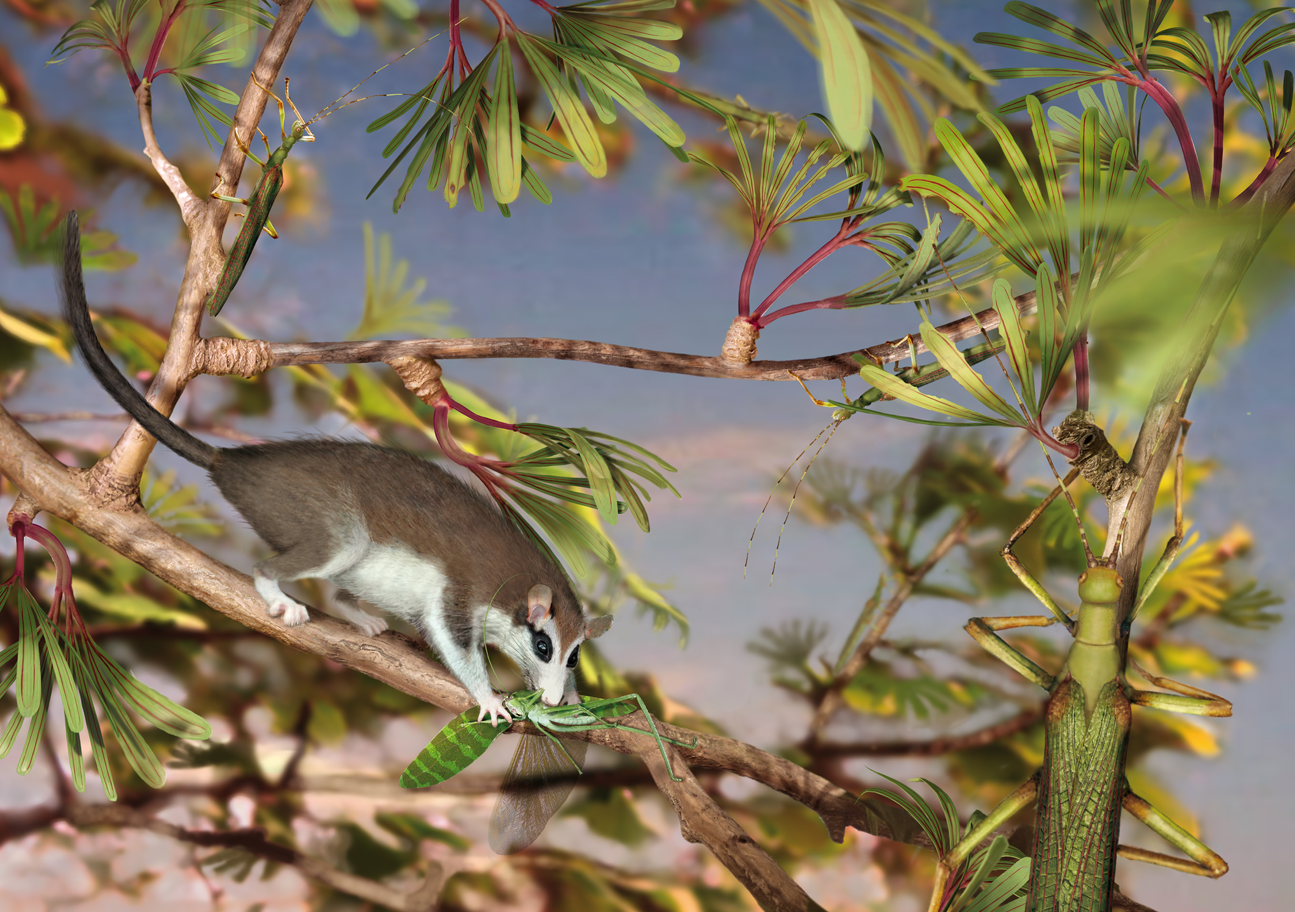
Restoration of an Eomaia feeding on a Cretophasmomima

Cretophasmomima is an extinct genus of stem group-stick insect from the Cretaceous of Eurasia and is one of the oldest and most basal stick insects known, it belongs to the Susumanioidea.

== Species ==
The type species, Cretophasmomima vitimica, was described in 1985 from the Aptian aged Zaza Formation in Russia. A second species, Cretophasmomima burjatica was described from the same formation in 1988. A third and fourth species, Cretophasmomima clara and Cretophasmomima arkagalica were also described in 1988 in the same paper from the Ola Formation and the Arkagalinskaya Formation respectively, both formations are Lower Campanian in age. A fifth species Cretophasmomima melanogramma was described in 2014 off the basis of three specimens from the Aptian Yixian Formation in China. In 2020 a sixth species Cretophasmomima traceyae was described based on a forewing with preserved colouration from the Barremian aged Weald Clay Formation in England.
