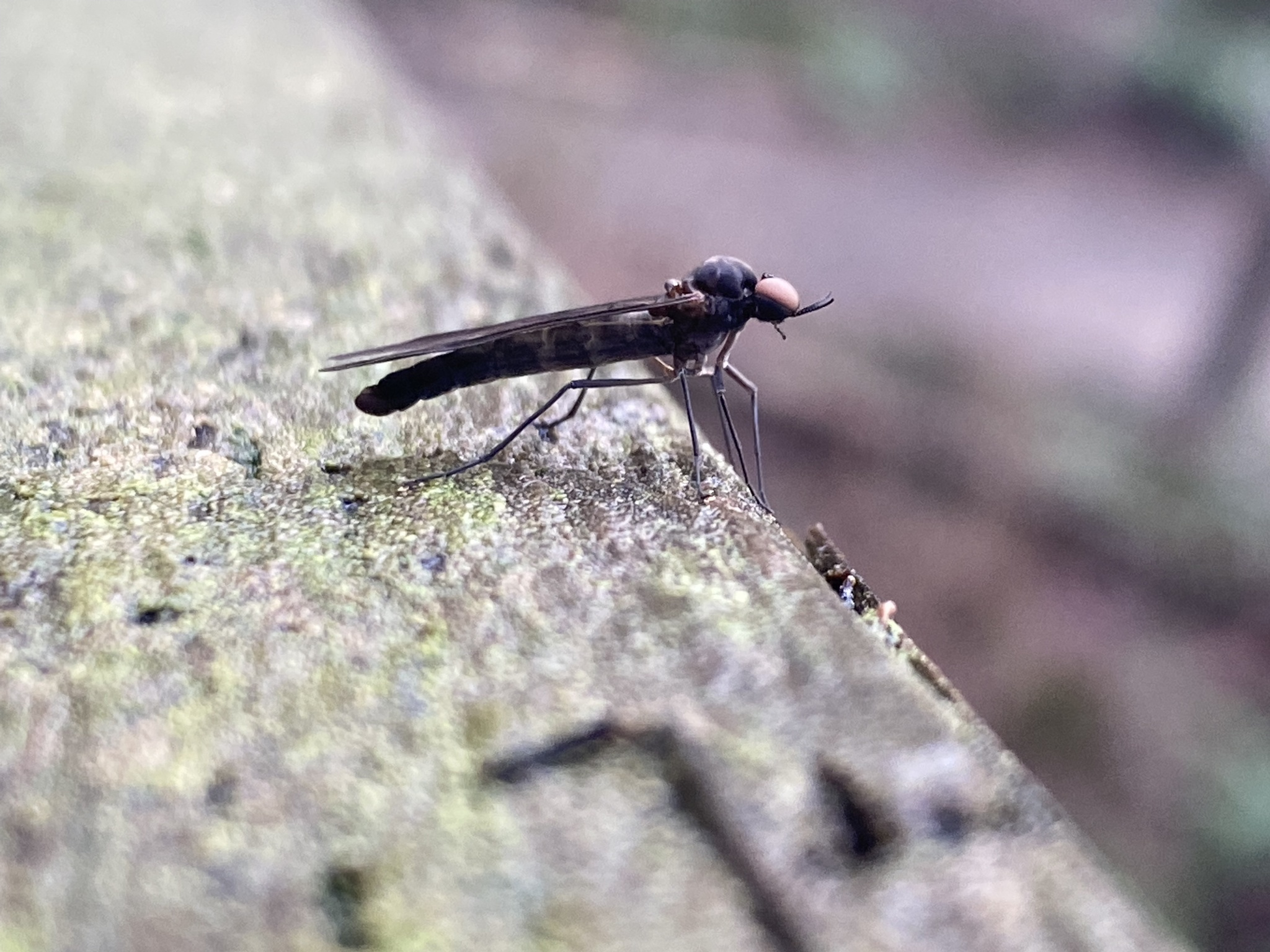
- Protaxymyia thuja

Scientific classification
- Kingdom: Animalia
- Phylum: Arthropoda
- Class: Insecta
- Order: Diptera
- Suborder: Nematocera
- Infraorder: Axymyiomorpha
- Family: Axymyiidae; Shannon, 1921

Genera and species
- See text

= Axymyiidae =

Family of flies

The nematoceran family Axymyiidae is the sole member of the infraorder Axymyiomorpha, though it is often included within the infraorder Bibionomorpha in older classifications. It is known from only nine species in four genera, plus eight fossil species.

== Family characteristics ==
The Axymyiidae have the general appearance of the Bibionidae. Unlike bibionids, axymyiids have four branches of the radial vein, Bibionidae have two or three.

The head is rounded. The eyes of the male are holoptic for a considerable distance and divided into a larger dorsal part consisting of large facets and (separated by a groove) a smaller ventral part of smaller facets. The eyes of the female are separated by a broad frons and consist of separated facets. The three ocelli are on a prominence. The antennae are short with 14 to 16 transverse segments which are covered with sparse, short hairs. The oral parts are reduced. The palpi are four- to five-segmented.

Wings have an ocellus. Wing-venation: The subcostal vein merges into the anterior alar margin near its midpoint; radial vein 1 reaches the distal quarter of wings, there usually fused with radial vein 2+3; radial vein 4 is branched proximal to the anterior crossvein of the wing. Median vein 1 and 2 have short trunks. The anal vein does not reach the alar margin.

The tibiae are slightly longer than the femora, but somewhat shorter than the tarsi. The empodium and pulvilli are well developed.

== Biology ==
Larvae live in decomposing wood.

== Genera ==
The family contains four extant genera and four extinct genera:

- Axymyia McAtee, 1921
  - Axymyia furcata McAtee, 1921
- Mesaxymyia Mamaev, 1968
  - Mesaxymyia kerteszi (Duda, 1930)
  - Mesaxymyia stackelbergi Mamaev, 1968
- Plesioaxymyia Sinclair, 2013
  - Plesioaxymyia vespertina Sinclair, 2013
- Protaxymyia Mamaev & Krivosheina, 1966
  - Protaxymyia japonica (Ishida, 1953)
  - Protaxymyia melanoptera Mamaev & Krivosheina, 1966
  - Protaxymyia sinica Yang, 1993
  - Protaxymyia taiwanensis Papp, 2007
  - Protaxymyia thuja Fitzgerald & Wood, 2014
- †Juraxymyia Zhang, 2010
  - †Juraxymyia evae Blagoderov & Lukashevich, 2013
  - †Juraxymyia fossilis (Zhang, 2004)
  - †Juraxymyia krzeminskii Blagoderov & Lukashevich, 2013
- †Psocites Hong, 1992
  - †Psocites pectinatus (Hong, 1983)
- †Raraxymyia Shi et al., 2013
  - †Raraxymyia parallela Shi et al., 2013
  - †Raraxymyia proxima Shi et al., 2013
- †Sinaxymyia Zhang, 2010
  - †Sinaxymyia rara Zhang, 2010
  - †Sinaxymyia szadziewskii Blagoderov & Lukashevich, 2013
