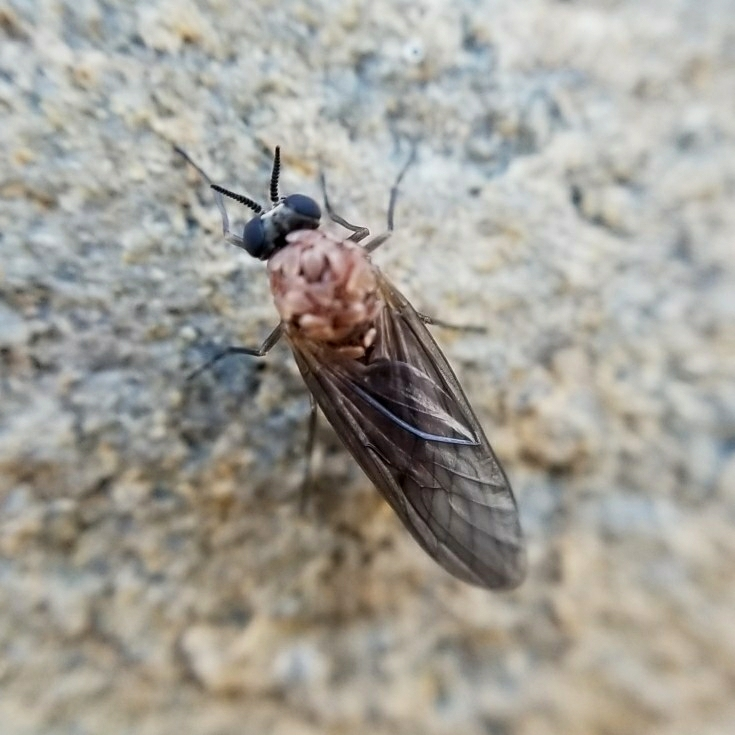

Scientific classification
- Kingdom: Animalia
- Phylum: Arthropoda
- Class: Insecta
- Order: Diptera
- Family: Axymyiidae
- Genus: Axymyia; McAtee, 1921
- Species: A. furcata

Binomial name
- Axymyia furcata McAtee, 1921

= Axymyia =

Genus of flies

Axymyia is a genus of nematoceran flies in the family Axymyiidae. It contains only one described species, Axymyia furcata, from eastern North America. A second species, Axymyia japonica Ishida, 1953, is sometimes listed, but this species is now generally placed in the related genus Protaxymyia.
