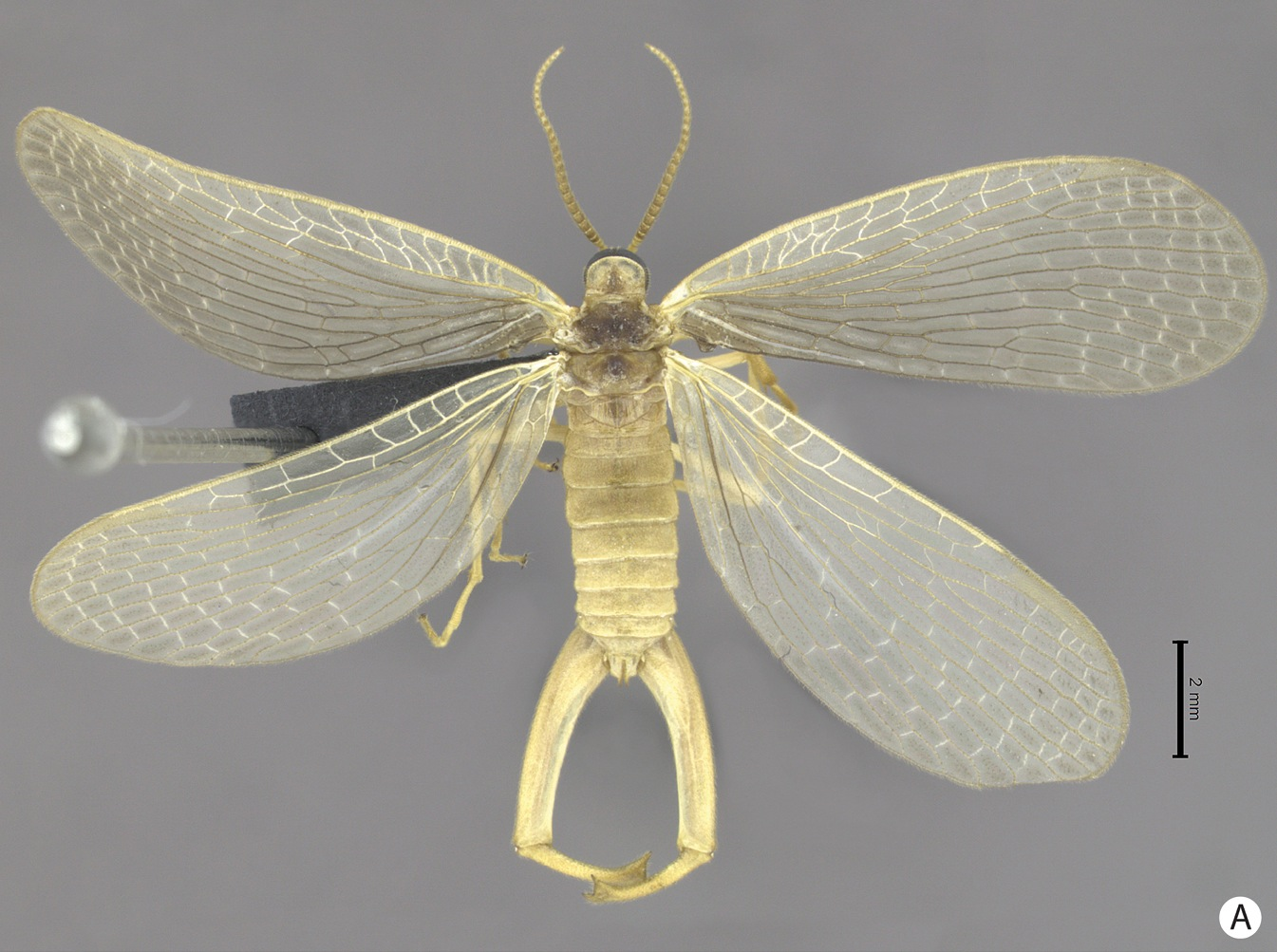
- Merope tuber
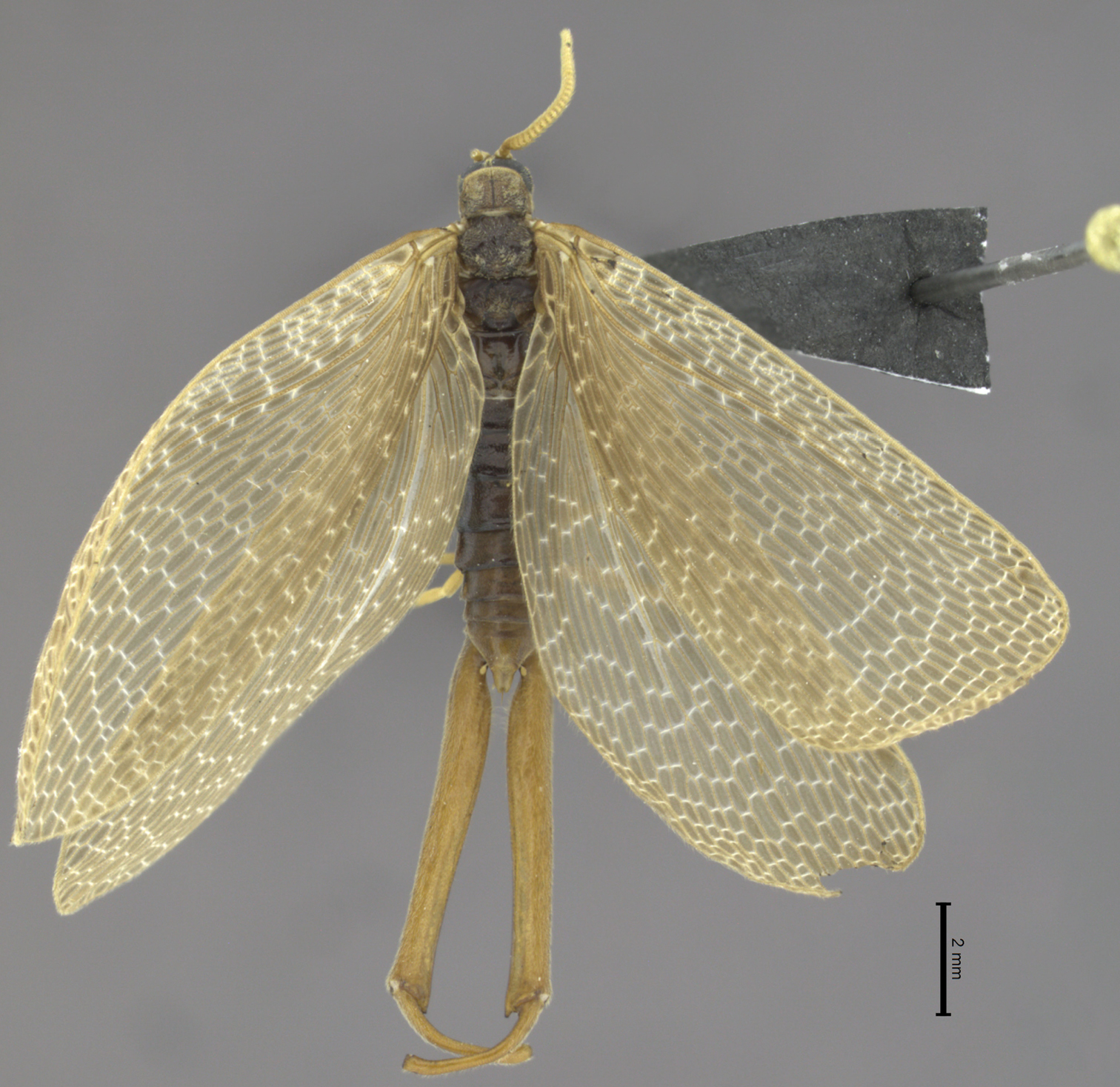
- Austromerope brasiliensis

Scientific classification
- Kingdom: Animalia
- Phylum: Arthropoda
- Clade: Pancrustacea
- Class: Insecta
- Order: Mecoptera
- Family: Meropeidae; Handlirsch 1906

Genera
- Austromerope Killington, 1933 (Australia, Brazil); †Boreomerope Novokschonov, 1995 (Siberia; extinct); Merope Newman, 1838 (USA, Canada); †Burmomerope Grimaldi & Engel, 2013; †TorvimeropeZhang, et al. 2024

= Meropeidae =

Meropeidae Temporal range: Middle Jurassic to Recent 170–0 Ma

Family of insects

Meropeidae is a family of tiny scorpionflies within the order Mecoptera with only three known living species, commonly referred to as "earwigflies" (or sometimes "forcepflies"), based on the earwig-like forceps-shaped male genitalia. The living species are the North American Merope tuber, the Western Australian Austromerope poultoni, and the recently discovered South American A. brasiliensis. The biology of these species is essentially unknown, and their larvae have never been seen. The adults have been suggested to probably be saprophagous, though they have never been observed feeding. The fossil record of the group extends back to the Jurassic. The earliest known member is Boreomerope antiqua known from an isolated wing found in the Middle Jurassic Itat Formation of Siberia. Other extinct genera include Burmomerope with three species and Torvimerope with one species are both from the mid Cretaceous (Cenomanian) aged Burmese amber. As such, the extant members of this family can be considered living fossils. These insects are also of interest due to their presumed basal position in the order Mecoptera. Thaumatomerope with four described species all from the Madygen Formation in Kyrgyzstan has historically sometimes been included within the family, it was placed into its own monotypic family, "Thaumatomeropidae." in 2002.

The closest relatives of the family are thought to be Eomeropidae, another relictual family of mecopterans with only 1 living species whose fossil record also extends back to the Jurassic. The family name was spelt "Meropidae" in old literature but this clashes with the homonymous family name in birds for bee-eaters. The spelling of Meropeidae was adopted for the insect family by the ICZN in Opinion 140 of 1943.

Phylogeny after Zhang et al. 2023:

- Meropeidae
  - †Boreomerope
  - - - †Torvimerope
      - †Burmomerope
    - - Merope tuber
      - Austromerope
