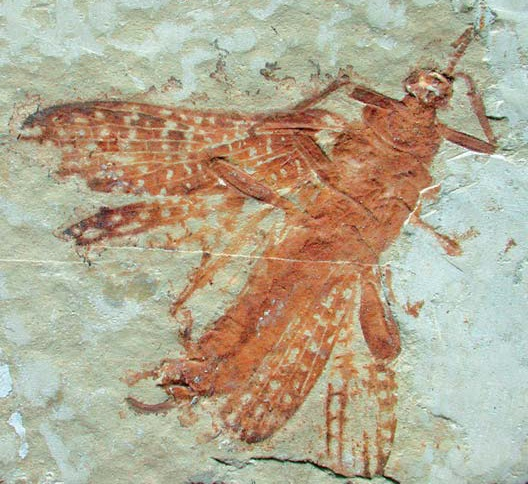
- Holotype

Scientific classification
- Domain: Eukaryota
- Kingdom: Animalia
- Phylum: Arthropoda
- Class: Insecta
- Order: Phasmatodea
- Family: †Susumaniidae
- Subfamily: †Susumaniinae
- Genus: †Renphasma; Nel & Delfosse, 2011
- Species: †R. sinica

Binomial name
- †Renphasma sinica Nel & Delfosse, 2011

= Renphasma =

Renphasma Temporal range: Aptian

Extinct genus of insects

Renphasma is an extinct genus of stick insect which existed in what is now China during the early Cretaceous period. It was named by André Nel and Emmanuel Delfosse in 2011, and the type species is Renphasma sinica, found in the early Aptian aged Yixian Formation. The generic name refers to Dr. Ren Dong, while the specific name refers to Sinica, the Latin name for China.
