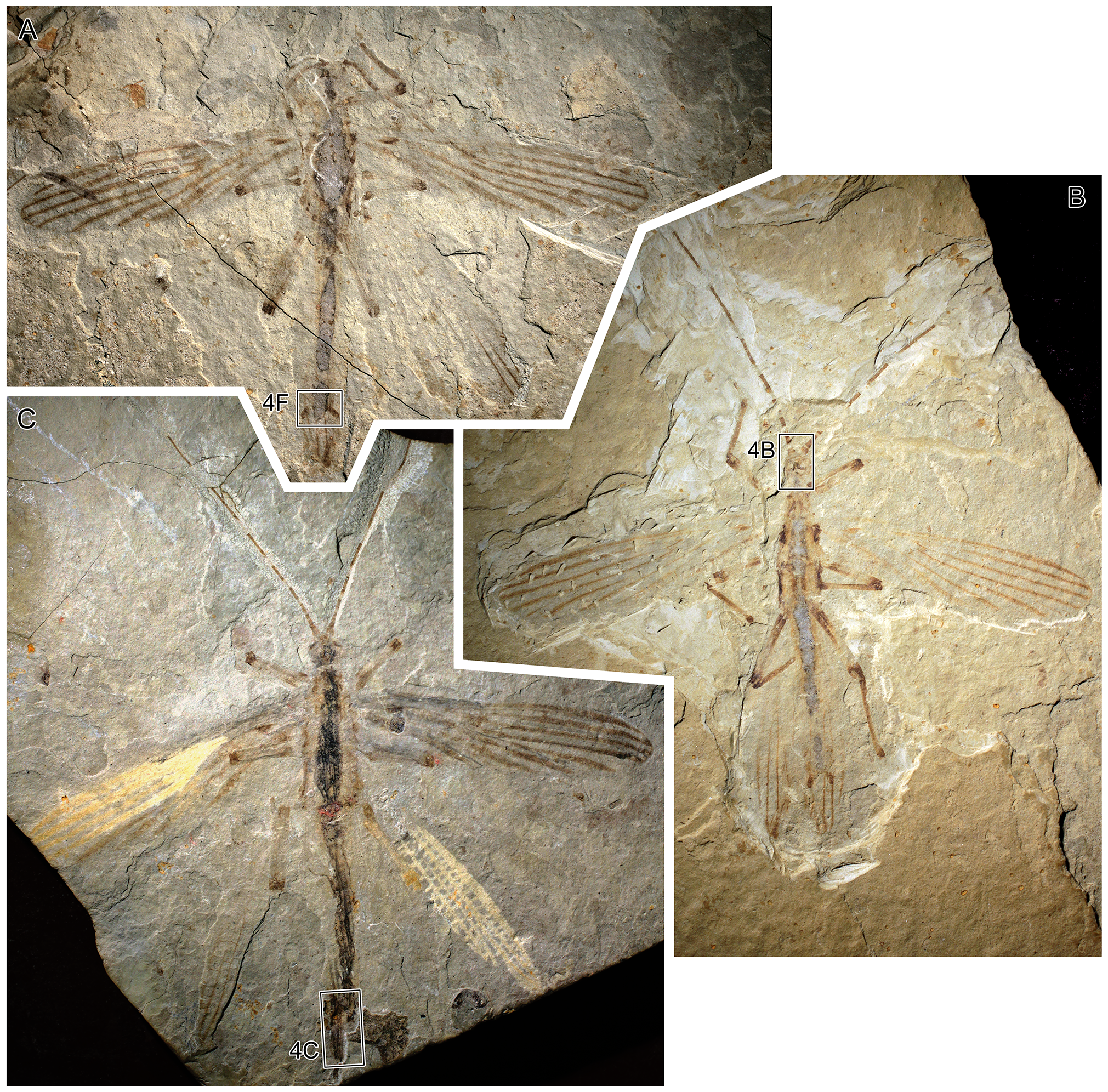
- Cretophasmomima melanogramma

Scientific classification
- Kingdom: Animalia
- Phylum: Arthropoda
- Clade: Pancrustacea
- Class: Insecta
- Order: Phasmatodea
- Suborder: †incertae sedis
- Superfamily: †Susumanioidea; Gorochov, 1988
- Family: †Susumaniidae; Gorochov, 1988

Subfamilies
- See text

= Susumaniidae =

Susumaniidae Temporal range: Middle Jurassic–Eocene

Extinct superfamily of insects

Susumaniidae is an extinct family of Phasmatodea, known from the Middle Jurassic to Eocene. They lie outside the modern crown group of Phasmatodea. Members of the group typically possess large, fully developed wings.

== Taxonomy ==
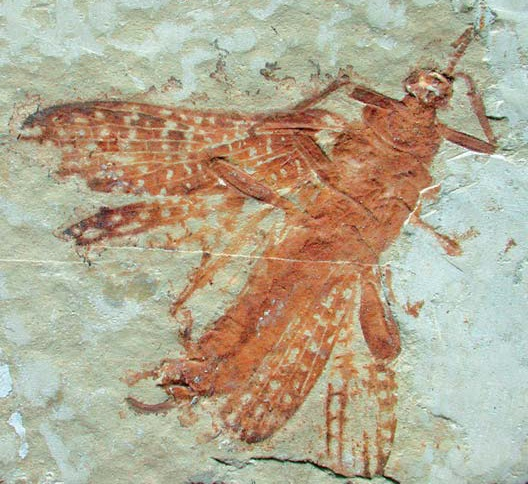
Renphasma sinica

According to Yang et al. (2021), and subsequent literature

Family Susumaniidae Gorochov, 1988

- Yananphasma Guo, et al. 2025 Yanan Formation, China, Middle Jurassic
- subfamily Phasmomimoidinae Gorochov, 1988
  - Phasmomimoides Sharov, 1968 - 5 species, Karabastau Formation, Kazakhstan, Callovian-Oxfordian, Zaza Formation, Russia, Aptian
- subfamily Aclistophasmatinae Yang et al., 2021
  - Aclistophasma Yang et al., 2021 - Jiulongshan Formation (Daohugou Beds), China, Callovian
  - Adjacivena Shang et al. 2011 - Daohugou Beds, China, Callovian
- subfamily Susumaniinae Gorochov, 1988
  - Aethephasma Ren, 1997 - Yixian Formation, China, Aptian
  - Coniphasma Birket-Smith, 1981 - 3 species, Yixian Formation, Aptian; Umivik locality, Greenland, Coniacian
  - Cretophasmomima Kuzmina, 1985 - Weald Clay, England, Barremian, Yixian Formation, China, Aptian Zaza Formation, Russia, Aptian, Ola Formation. Arkagalinskaya Formation, Russia, Campanian
  - Cretophasmomimoides Gorochov, 1988 - Anda-Khuduk Formation, Mongolia, Aptian
  - Eoprephasma Archibald & Bradler, 2015 - Klondike Mountain Formation, United States, Ypresian
  - Eosusumania Gorochov, 1988 - Emanra Formation, Russia, Turonian
  - Hagiphasma Ren, 1997 - Yixian Formation, China, Aptian
  - Kolymoptera Gorochov, 1988 - Arkagalinskaya Formation, Russia, Campanian
  - Orephasma Ren, 1997 - Yixian Formation, China, Aptian
  - Palaeopteron Rice, 1969 - Redmond Formation, Canada, Cenomanian
  - Paraphasmomimella Kuzmina, 1985 - Zaza Formation, Russia, Aptian Emanra Formation, Russia, Turonian
  - Phasmomimella Kevan & Wighton, 1981 - Crato Formation, Brazil, Aptian, Zaza Formation, Russia, Aptian, Paskapoo Formation, Canada, Paleocene
  - Phasmomimula Kevan & Wighton, 1981 - Paskapoo Formation, Canada, Paleocene
  - Promastacoides Kevan & Wighton, 1981 - Paskapoo Formation, Canada, Paleocene
  - Prosusumania Gorochov, 1988 - Argun Formation, Russia, Aptian
  - Renphasma Nel & Delfosse, 2011 - Yixian Formation, China, Aptian
  - Susumania Gorochov, 1988 - Arkagalinskaya Formation, Russia, Campanian
