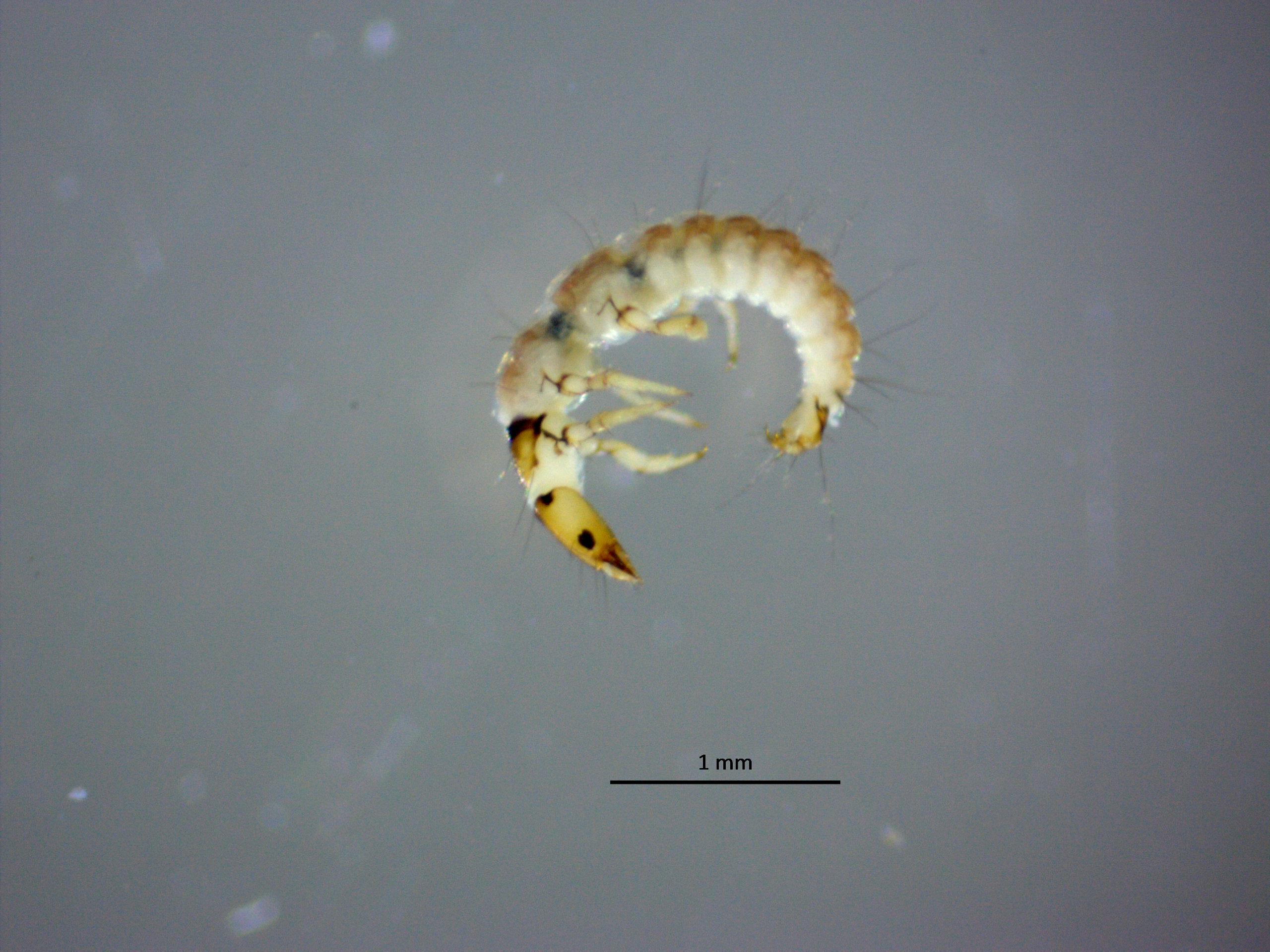
- Psychomyia pusilla larva

Scientific classification
- Kingdom: Animalia
- Phylum: Arthropoda
- Clade: Pancrustacea
- Class: Insecta
- Order: Trichoptera
- Family: Psychomyiidae; Walker, 1852

Subfamilies
- Eoneureclipsinae; Psychomyiinae; Tinodinae

= Psychomyiidae =

Family of caddisflies

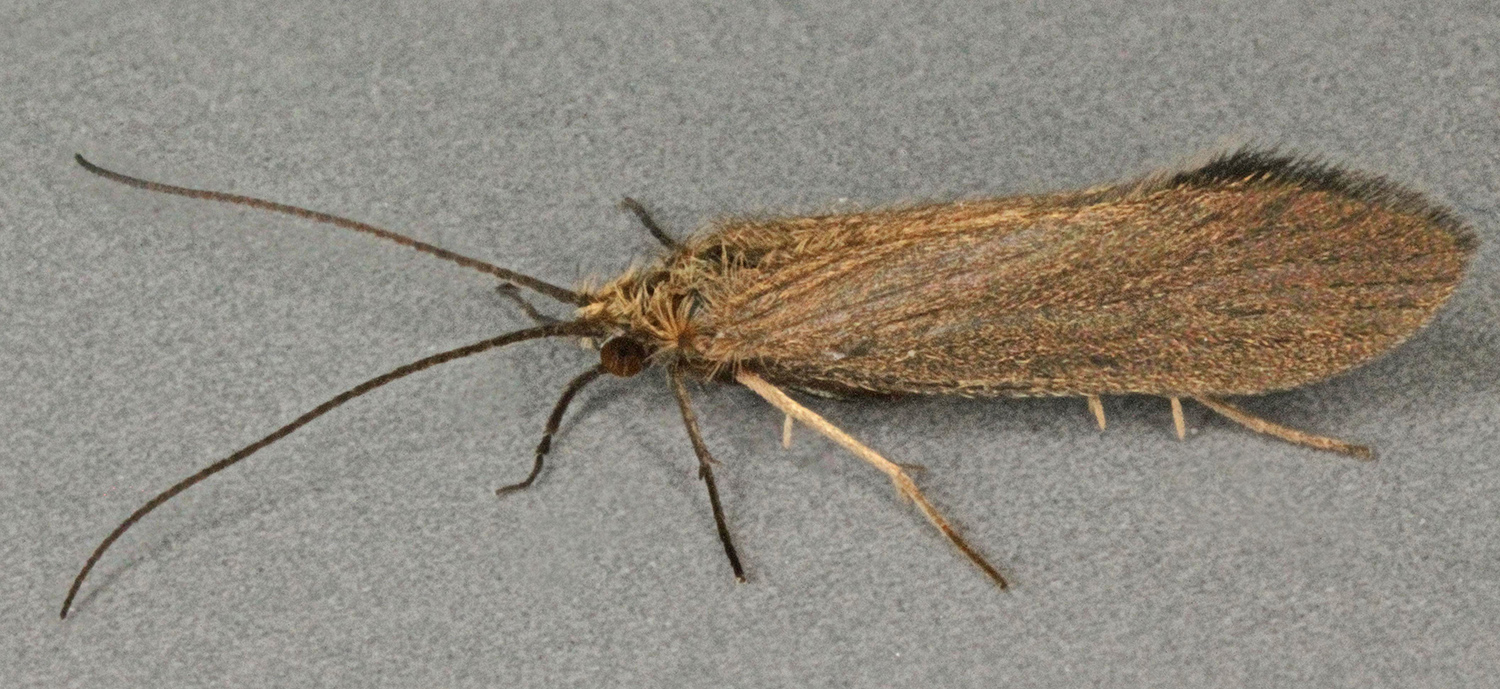
Tinodes assimilis

The Psychomyiidae are a family of tube-making caddisflies. Members of this family are typically very similar to polycentropodids, most of them can be differentiated by the spur formula is 2-4-4, thyridial cell short, absence of the forewing fork I, and hindwing forks I and IV (except in Eoneureclipsis). Male genitalia has elongate preanal appendages, and reduced tergum IX. The larvae differ by the submental sclerites separated, foretrochantin broad, and the pupal mandible apex whip-like. Larvae construct long silken galleries.

The type genus for Psychomyiidae is Psychomyia P.A. Latreille, 1829.

Psychomyiella Ulmer, 1908 is considered a junior synonym of Psychomyiia. Phylogenetic analysis of Johanson & Espeland (2010) found the genus Zelandoptila Tillyard, 1924 placed within the family Ecnomidae although the genus was previously placed in Psychomyiidae.

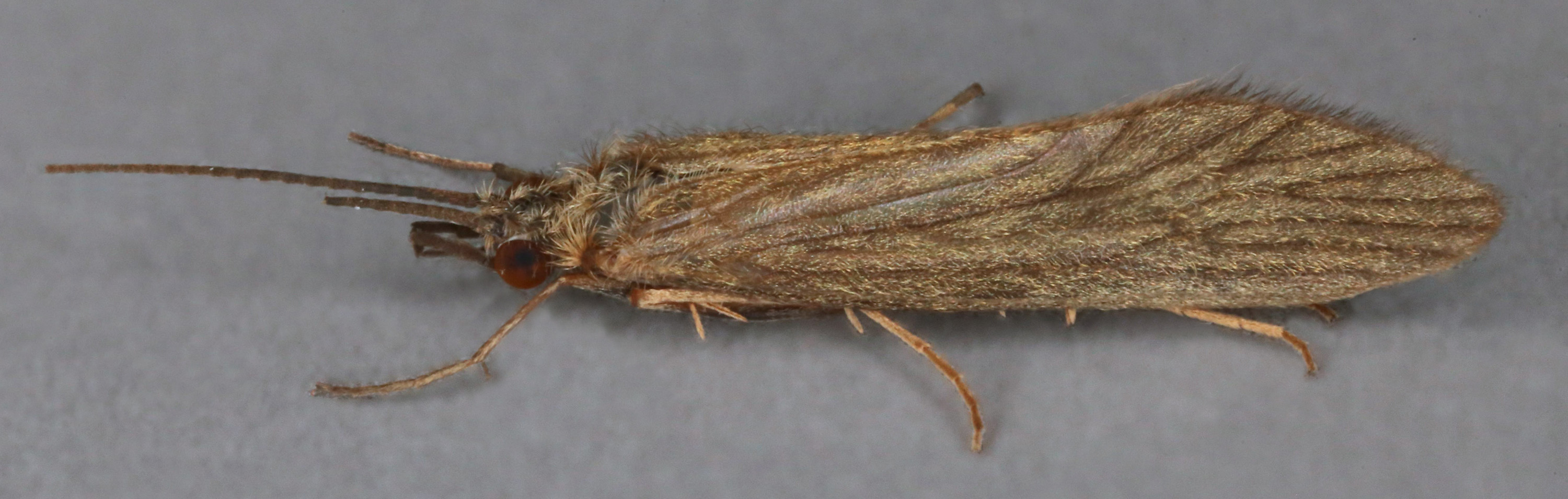
Tinodes waeneri

== Genera ==
These 10 genera belong to the family Psychomyiidae:

- Eoneureclipsis Kimmins, 1955
- Lype McLachlan, 1878^{i c g b}
- Metalype Klapalek, 1898^{i c g}
- Padangpsyche Malicky, 1993^{i c g}
- Paduniella Ulmer, 1913^{i c g}
- †Palerasnitsynus Wichard, Ross & Ross, 2011^{g}
- Psychomyia Latreille in Cuvier, 1829^{i c g}
- Tinodes Curtis, 1834^{i c g b}
- Trawaspsyche Malicky, 2004
- †Trichopterodomus Erickson, 1983^{g}

Data sources: i = ITIS, c = Catalogue of Life, g = GBIF, b = Bugguide.net
