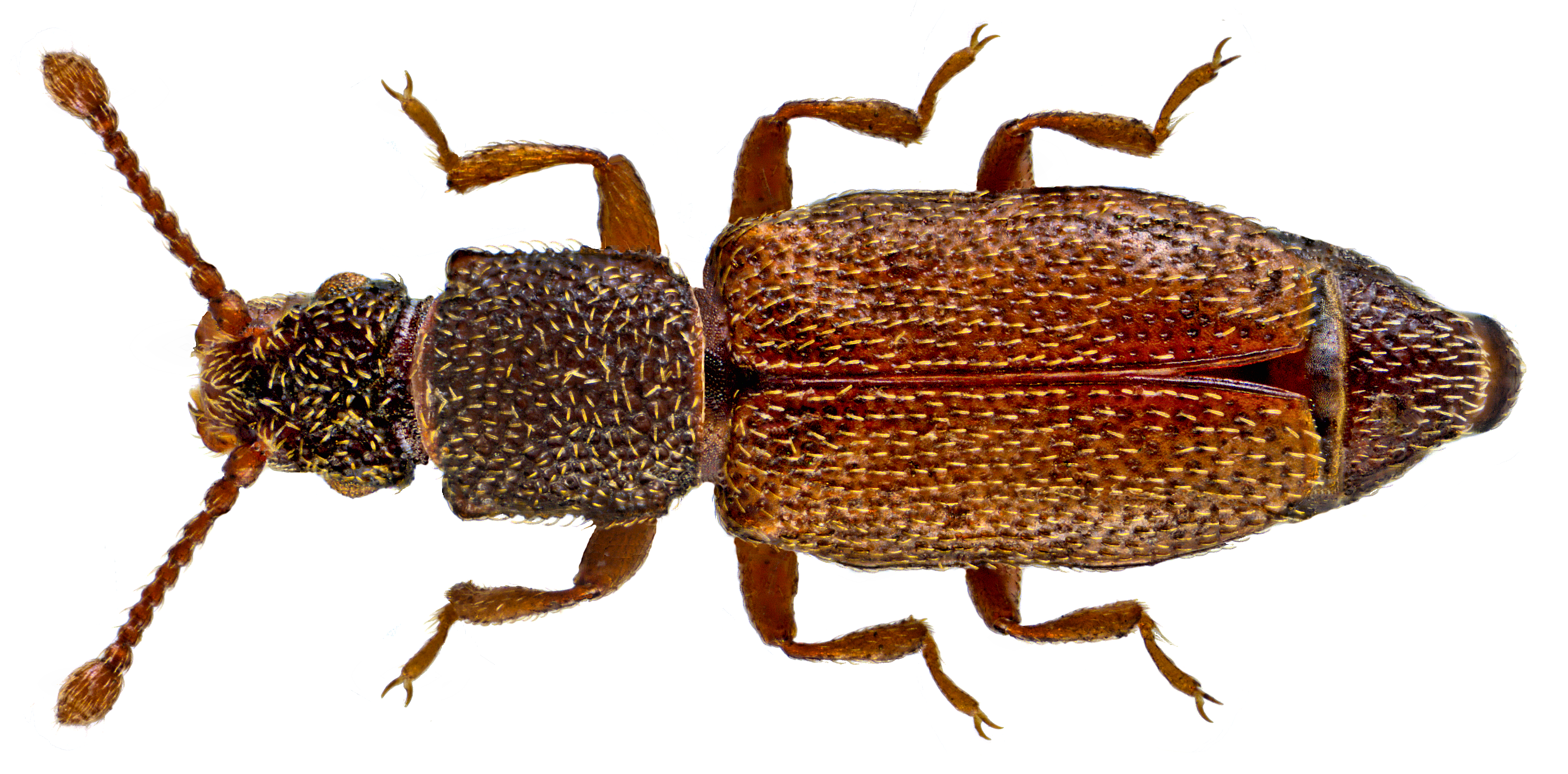
- Monotoma bicolor

Scientific classification
- Domain: Eukaryota
- Kingdom: Animalia
- Phylum: Arthropoda
- Class: Insecta
- Order: Coleoptera
- Suborder: Polyphaga
- Infraorder: Cucujiformia
- Family: Monotomidae
- Subfamily: Monotominae; Laporte, 1840

Tribes
- Europini Sen Gupta, 1988; Lenacini Crowson, 1952; Monotomini Laporte, 1840; Thionini Crowson, 1952; † Rhizophtomini Kirejtshuk & Azar, 2009

= Monotominae =

Subfamily of beetles

Monotominae is a subfamily of root-eating beetles in the family Monotomidae. There are about 10 genera and more than 80 described species in Monotominae.

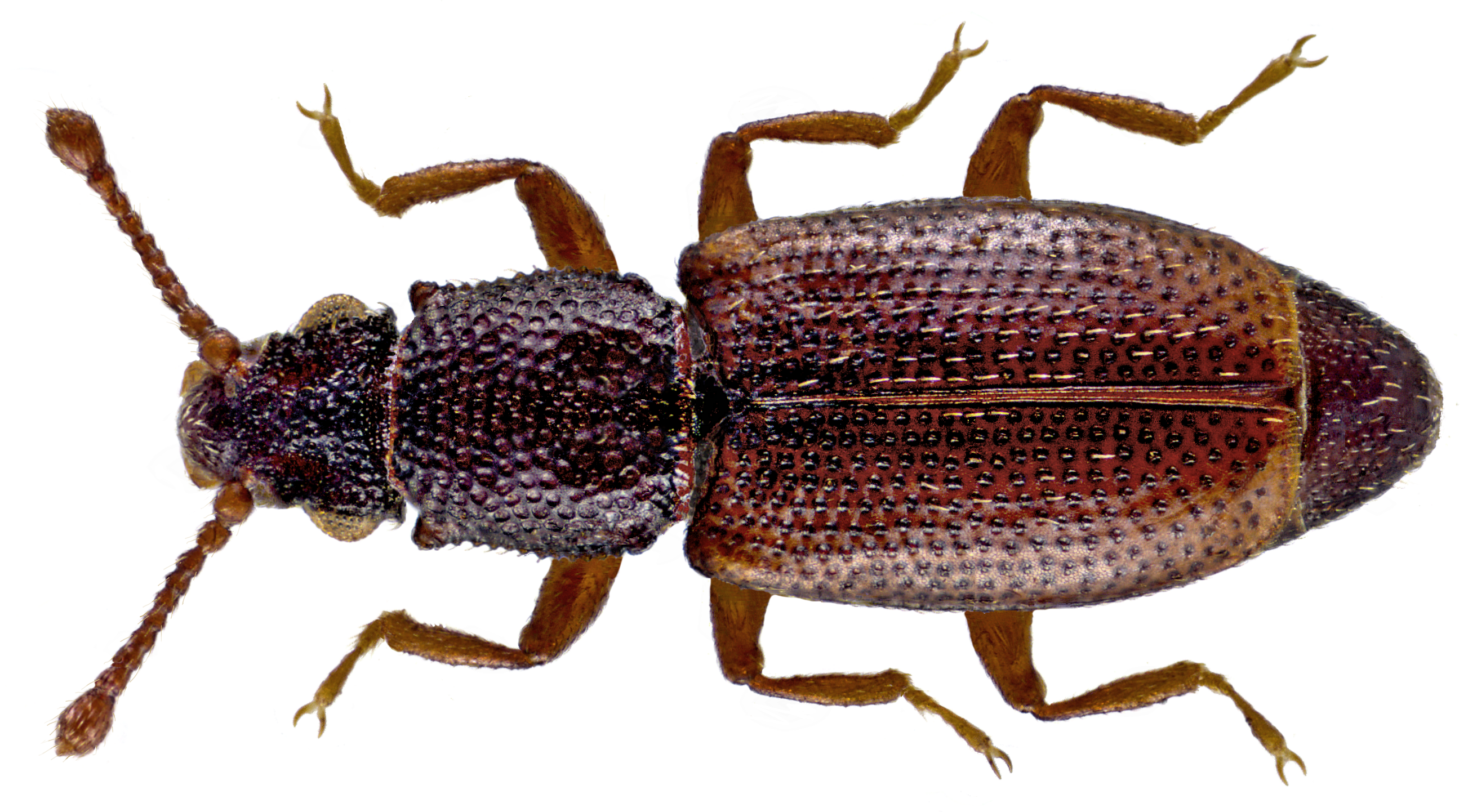
Monotoma picipes

== Genera ==
These 10 genera belong to the subfamily Monotominae:

- Aneurops Sharp, 1900
- Bactridium LeConte, 1861
- Europs Wollaston, 1854
- Hesperobaenus LeConte, 1861
- Leptipsius Casey, 1916
- Macreurops Casey, 1916
- Monotoma Herbst, 1793
- Phyconomus LeConte, 1861
- Pycnotomina Casey, 1916
- Thione Sharp, 1899
