= Europini =

Scientific classification
- Domain: Eukaryota
- Kingdom: Animalia
- Phylum: Arthropoda
- Class: Insecta
- Order: Coleoptera
- Suborder: Polyphaga
- Infraorder: Cucujiformia
- Family: Monotomidae
- Subfamily: Monotominae
- Tribe: Europini; Sen Gupta, 1988

Tribe of beetles

Europini is a tribe of root-eating beetles in the family Monotomidae. There are about 8 genera and at least 40 described species in Europini.

== Genera ==
These eight genera belong to the tribe Europini:

- Aneurops Sharp, 1900^{i c g b}
- Bactridium LeConte, 1861^{i c g b}
- Europs Wollaston, 1854^{i c g b}
- Hesperobaenus LeConte, 1861^{i c g b}
- Leptipsius Casey, 1916^{i c g b}
- Macreurops Casey, 1916^{i c g b}
- Phyconomus LeConte, 1861^{i c g b}
- Pycnotomina Casey, 1916^{i c g b}

Data sources: i = ITIS, c = Catalogue of Life, g = GBIF, b = Bugguide.net
