= Mimema =

Mimema can refer to one of the following:

- Mimema (beetle), a genus of insects in the family Monotomidae
- Mimema (fungus), a genus of rust fungi in the family Uropyxidaceae
