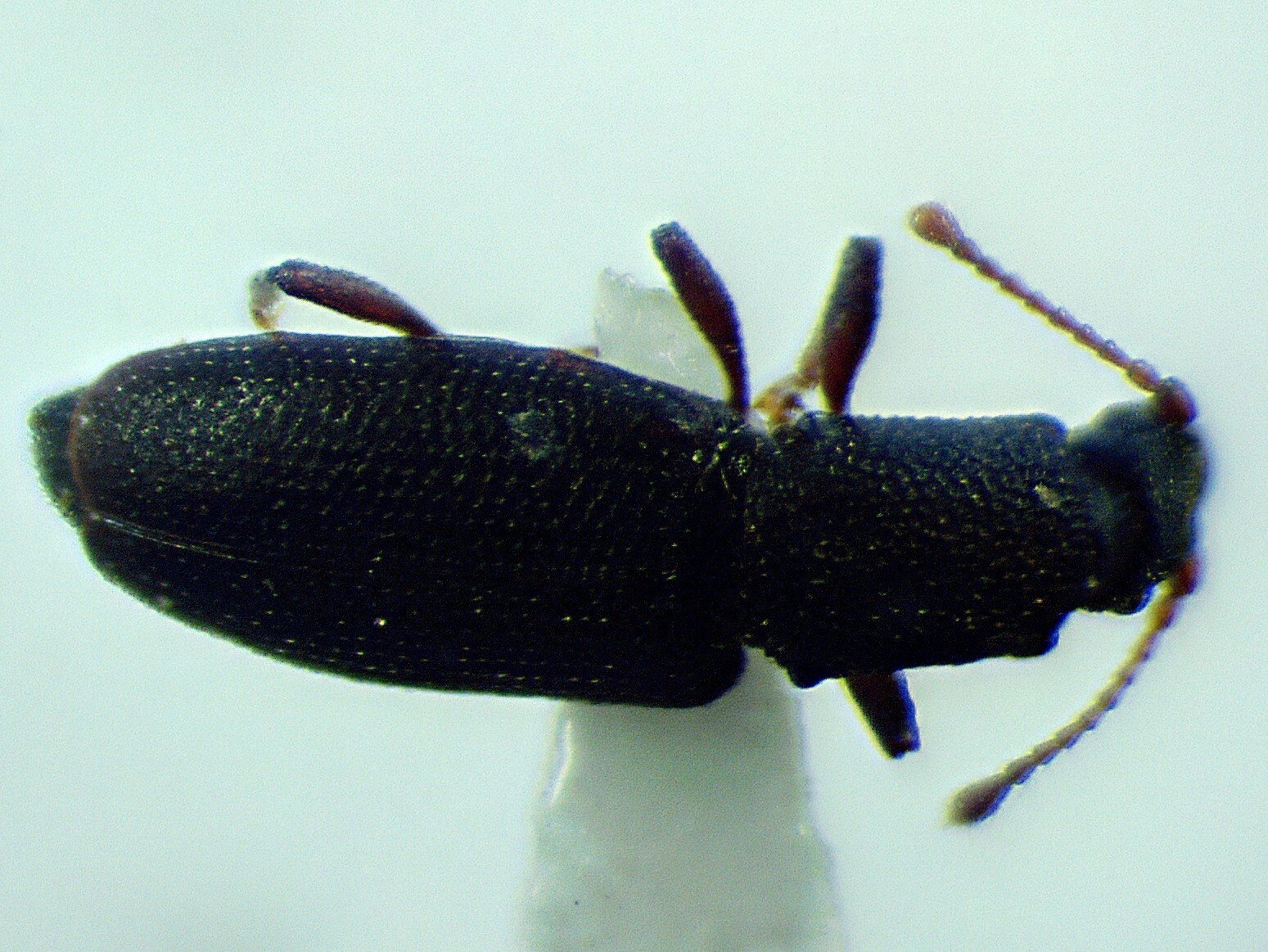

Scientific classification
- Kingdom: Animalia
- Phylum: Arthropoda
- Class: Insecta
- Order: Coleoptera
- Suborder: Polyphaga
- Infraorder: Cucujiformia
- Family: Monotomidae
- Genus: Monotoma
- Species: M. producta

Binomial name
- Monotoma producta LeConte, 1855

= Monotoma producta =

Species of beetle

Monotoma producta is a species of root-eating beetle in the family Monotomidae. It is found in North America.
