= Bactridium striolatum =

Scientific classification
- Kingdom: Animalia
- Phylum: Arthropoda
- Class: Insecta
- Order: Coleoptera
- Suborder: Polyphaga
- Infraorder: Cucujiformia
- Family: Monotomidae
- Genus: Bactridium
- Species: B. striolatum

Binomial name
- Bactridium striolatum (Reitter, 1872)

Species of beetle

Bactridium striolatum is a species of root-eating beetle in the family Monotomidae. It is found in North America.
