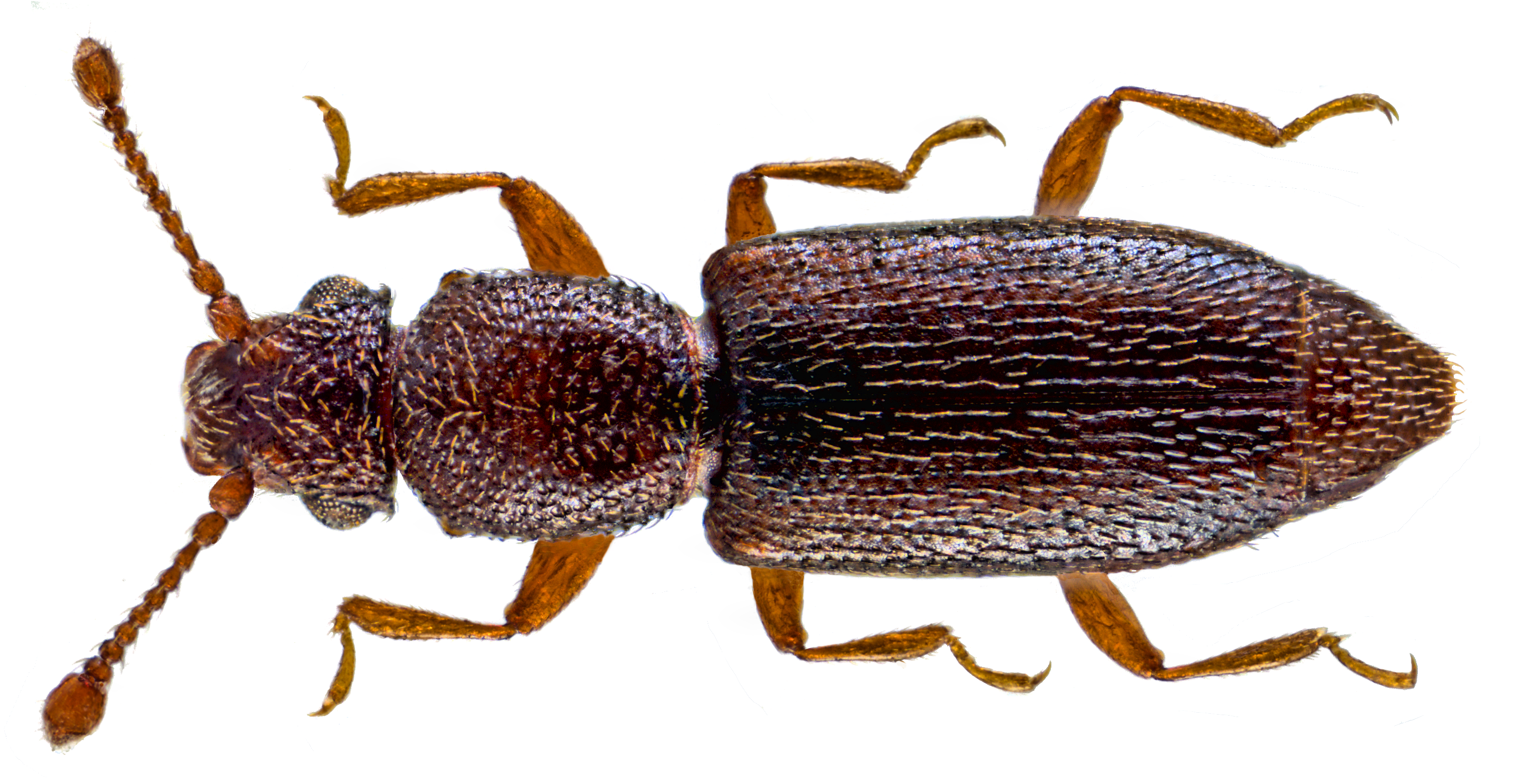

Scientific classification
- Kingdom: Animalia
- Phylum: Arthropoda
- Class: Insecta
- Order: Coleoptera
- Suborder: Polyphaga
- Infraorder: Cucujiformia
- Family: Monotomidae
- Genus: Monotoma
- Species: M. longicollis

Binomial name
- Monotoma longicollis (Gyllenhal, 1827)

= Monotoma longicollis =

Species of beetle

Monotoma longicollis is a species of root-eating beetle in the family Monotomidae. It is found in Africa, Australia, Europe and Northern Asia (excluding China), North America, and Southern Asia.

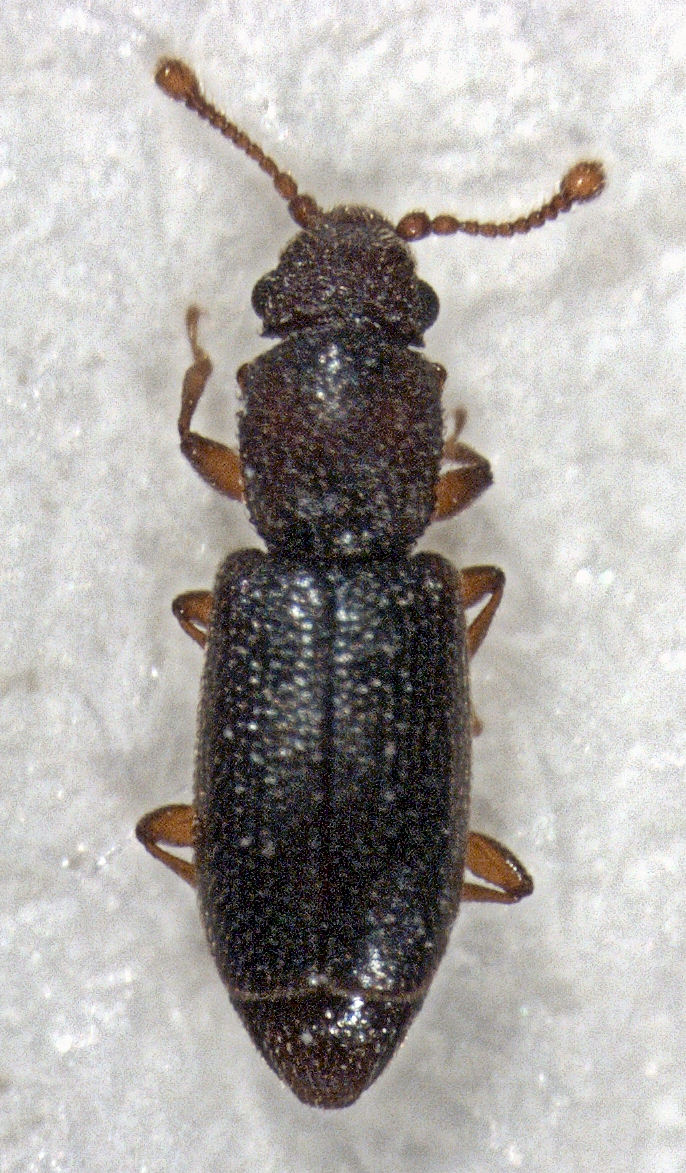
