= Leptipsius striatus =

Scientific classification
- Domain: Eukaryota
- Kingdom: Animalia
- Phylum: Arthropoda
- Class: Insecta
- Order: Coleoptera
- Suborder: Polyphaga
- Infraorder: Cucujiformia
- Family: Monotomidae
- Genus: Leptipsius
- Species: L. striatus

Binomial name
- Leptipsius striatus (LeConte, 1858)

Species of beetle

Leptipsius striatus is a species of root-eating beetle in the family Monotomidae. It is found in North America.
