= Monotoma myrmecophila =

Scientific classification
- Domain: Eukaryota
- Kingdom: Animalia
- Phylum: Arthropoda
- Class: Insecta
- Order: Coleoptera
- Suborder: Polyphaga
- Infraorder: Cucujiformia
- Family: Monotomidae
- Genus: Monotoma
- Species: M. myrmecophila

Binomial name
- Monotoma myrmecophila Bousquet & Laplante, 1999

Species of beetle

Monotoma myrmecophila is a species of root-eating beetle in the family Monotomidae. It is found in North America.
