= Rhizophagus sculpturatus =

Scientific classification
- Domain: Eukaryota
- Kingdom: Animalia
- Phylum: Arthropoda
- Class: Insecta
- Order: Coleoptera
- Suborder: Polyphaga
- Infraorder: Cucujiformia
- Family: Monotomidae
- Genus: Rhizophagus
- Species: R. sculpturatus

Binomial name
- Rhizophagus sculpturatus Mannerheim, 1852

Species of beetle

Rhizophagus sculpturatus is a species of root-eating beetle in the family Monotomidae. It is found in North America.
