= Rhizophagus brunneus =

Scientific classification
- Domain: Eukaryota
- Kingdom: Animalia
- Phylum: Arthropoda
- Class: Insecta
- Order: Coleoptera
- Suborder: Polyphaga
- Infraorder: Cucujiformia
- Family: Monotomidae
- Genus: Rhizophagus
- Species: R. brunneus

Binomial name
- Rhizophagus brunneus Horn, 1879

Species of beetle

Rhizophagus brunneus is a species of root-eating beetle in the family Monotomidae. It is found in Central America and North America.

== Subspecies ==
These two subspecies belong to the species Rhizophagus brunneus:

- Rhizophagus brunneus brunneus Horn, 1879
- Rhizophagus brunneus fenyesi Méquignon, 1913
