= Rhizophagus cylindricus =

Scientific classification
- Domain: Eukaryota
- Kingdom: Animalia
- Phylum: Arthropoda
- Class: Insecta
- Order: Coleoptera
- Suborder: Polyphaga
- Infraorder: Cucujiformia
- Family: Monotomidae
- Genus: Rhizophagus
- Species: R. cylindricus

Binomial name
- Rhizophagus cylindricus LeConte, 1866

Species of beetle

Rhizophagus cylindricus is a species of root-eating beetle in the family Monotomidae. It is found in North America.

== Geographical range ==
R. cylindricus is found across the United States. More specifically, from New York to Georgia, and west to Ohio and Alabama.

== Description ==
R. cylindricus is usually 2.0-5.0 mm in length. It is a narrow beetle of a darkened reddish brown. Appendages are a red/yellow. The bases of its front legs are widened; antenna clubbed. The mouthparts of males are long (mandibles), while the that of the females are more normal.

== Habitat ==
This beetle is commonly found under the bark of pine trees.

== Diet ==
Not much is known regarding the diet of R. cylindricus, but Rhizophagus generally eats fungi and dead insects.
