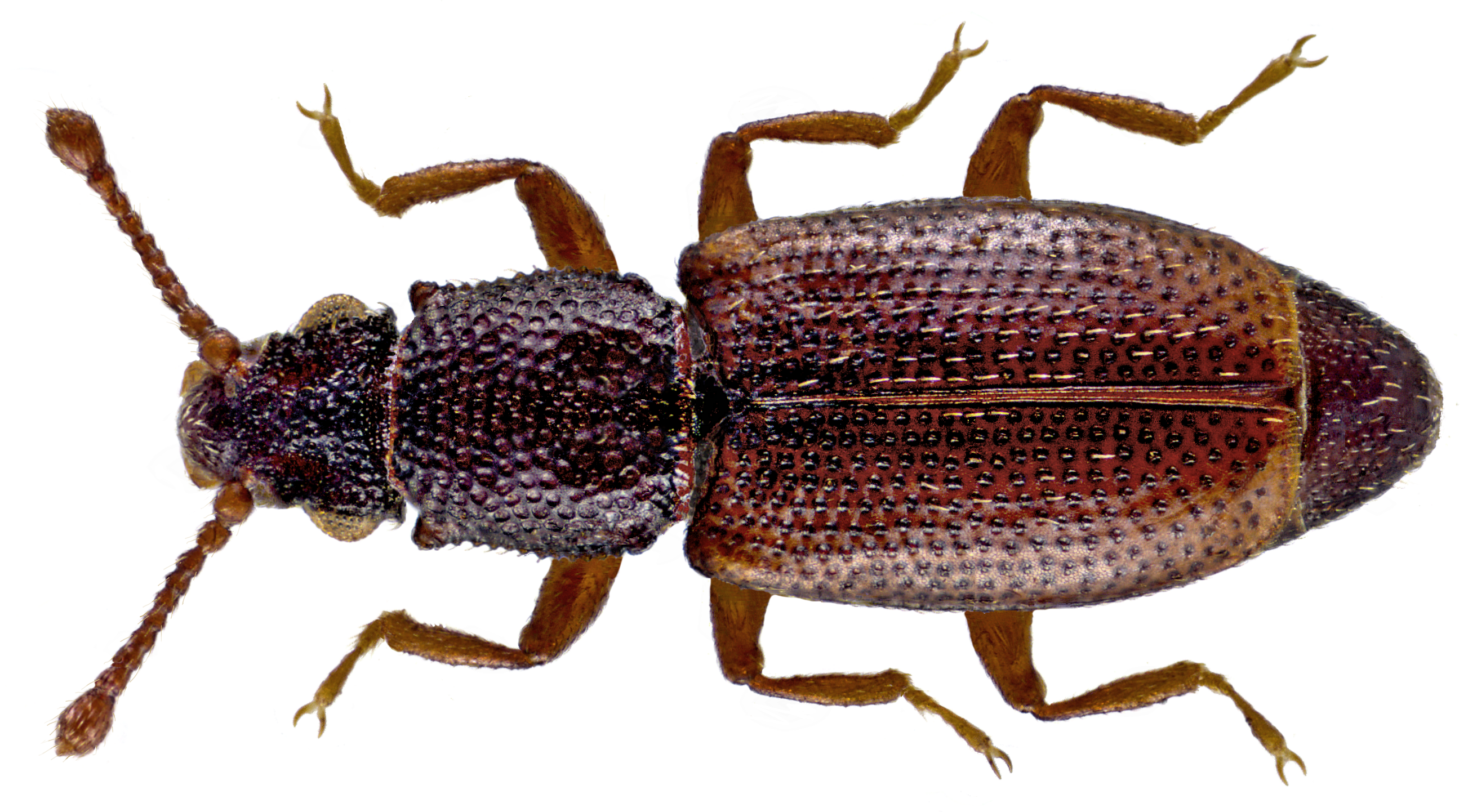

Scientific classification
- Kingdom: Animalia
- Phylum: Arthropoda
- Class: Insecta
- Order: Coleoptera
- Suborder: Polyphaga
- Infraorder: Cucujiformia
- Family: Monotomidae
- Genus: Monotoma
- Species: M. picipes

Binomial name
- Monotoma picipes Herbst, 1793

Synonyms
- Monotoma famelica Casey, 1916; Monotoma fulvipennis Motschulsky, 1868; Monotoma fulvipes Melsheimer, 1844; Monotoma obsolescens Casey, 1916; Monotoma quadraria Casey, 1916

= Monotoma picipes =

Species of beetle

Monotoma picipes is a species of root-eating beetle in the family Monotomidae. It is found in Africa, Australia, the Caribbean Sea, Europe and Northern Asia (excluding China), Central America, North America, Oceania, South America, and Southern Asia.
