= Hesperobaenus constricticollis =

Scientific classification
- Domain: Eukaryota
- Kingdom: Animalia
- Phylum: Arthropoda
- Class: Insecta
- Order: Coleoptera
- Suborder: Polyphaga
- Infraorder: Cucujiformia
- Family: Monotomidae
- Genus: Hesperobaenus
- Species: H. constricticollis

Binomial name
- Hesperobaenus constricticollis Bousquet, 2002

Species of beetle

Hesperobaenus constricticollis is a species of root-eating beetle in the family Monotomidae. It is found in North America.
