= Rhizophagus minutus =

Scientific classification
- Domain: Eukaryota
- Kingdom: Animalia
- Phylum: Arthropoda
- Class: Insecta
- Order: Coleoptera
- Suborder: Polyphaga
- Infraorder: Cucujiformia
- Family: Monotomidae
- Genus: Rhizophagus
- Species: R. minutus

Binomial name
- Rhizophagus minutus Mannerheim, 1853

Species of beetle

Rhizophagus minutus is a species of root-eating beetle in the family Monotomidae. It is found in North America.

== Subspecies ==
These two subspecies belong to the species Rhizophagus minutus:

- Rhizophagus minutus minutus Mannerheim, 1853
- Rhizophagus minutus rotundicollis Bousquet, 1990
