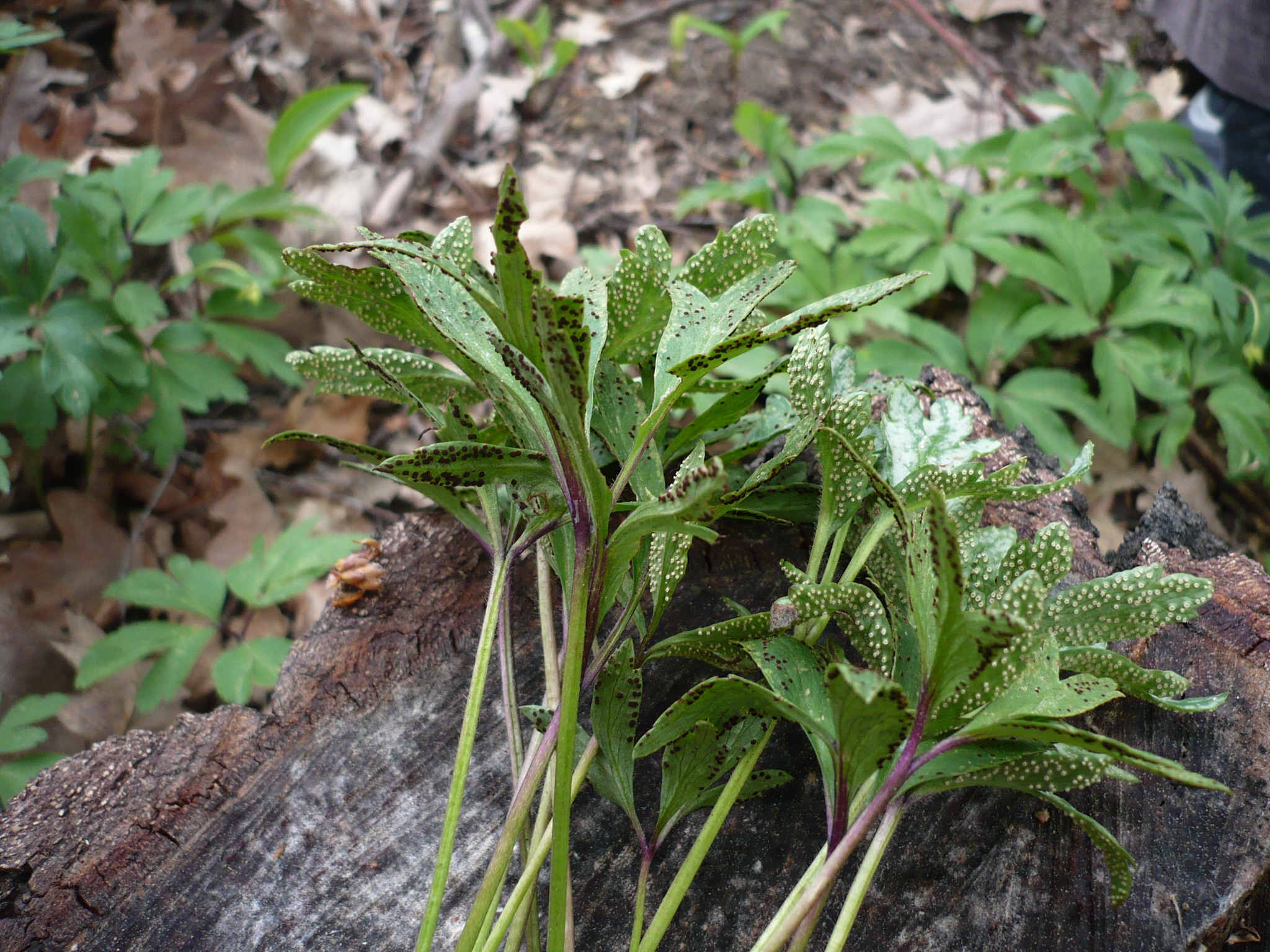
- Tranzschelia discolor on Anemone sp.

Scientific classification
- Kingdom: Fungi
- Division: Basidiomycota
- Class: Pucciniomycetes
- Order: Pucciniales
- Family: Uropyxidaceae
- Genus: Tranzschelia
- Species: T. pruni-spinosae
- Variety: T. p. var. discolor

Trinomial name
- Tranzschelia pruni-spinosae var. discolor (Fuckel) Tranzschel & M.A. Litv., (1939)

Synonyms
- Aecidium punctatum Pers., Ann. Bot. (Usteri) 20: 135 (1796); Aecidiolum punctatum (Pers.) Sacc. & D. Sacc., Syll. fung. (Abellini) 17: 433 (1905); Aecidium quadrifidum DC., Encycl. Méth. Bot. 8: 239 (1808); Caeoma punctatum (Pers.) Link, in Willdenow, Sp. pl., Edn 4 6(2): 56 (1825); Caeoma quadrifidum (DC.) Link, in Willdenow, Sp. pl., Edn 4 6(2): 55 (1825); Puccinia discolor Fuckel, Fungi rhenani exsic., suppl., fasc. 7(nos 2101-2200): no. 2121 (1868); Puccinia pruni-spinosae f. discolor (Fuckel) J.C. Fisch., (1904); Tranzschelia pruni-spinosae var. discolor (Fuckel) Dunegan, Phytopathology 28: 424 (1938); Tranzschelia punctata (Pers.) Arthur, Résult. Sci. Congr. Bot. Wien 1905: 340 (1906)

= Tranzschelia pruni-spinosae var. discolor =

Species of fungus

Tranzschelia discolor is a plant pathogen in the family Uropyxidaceae.

It can affect peaches (Prunus persica) in Oman, with angular, yellow spots being seen on leaf upper surfaces with orange sori on the undersides.
