= Aneurops convergens =

Scientific classification
- Kingdom: Animalia
- Phylum: Arthropoda
- Class: Insecta
- Order: Coleoptera
- Suborder: Polyphaga
- Infraorder: Cucujiformia
- Family: Monotomidae
- Genus: Aneurops
- Species: A. convergens

Binomial name
- Aneurops convergens (Sharp, 1900)

Species of beetle

Aneurops convergens is a species of root-eating beetle in the family Monotomidae. It is found in Central America and North America.
