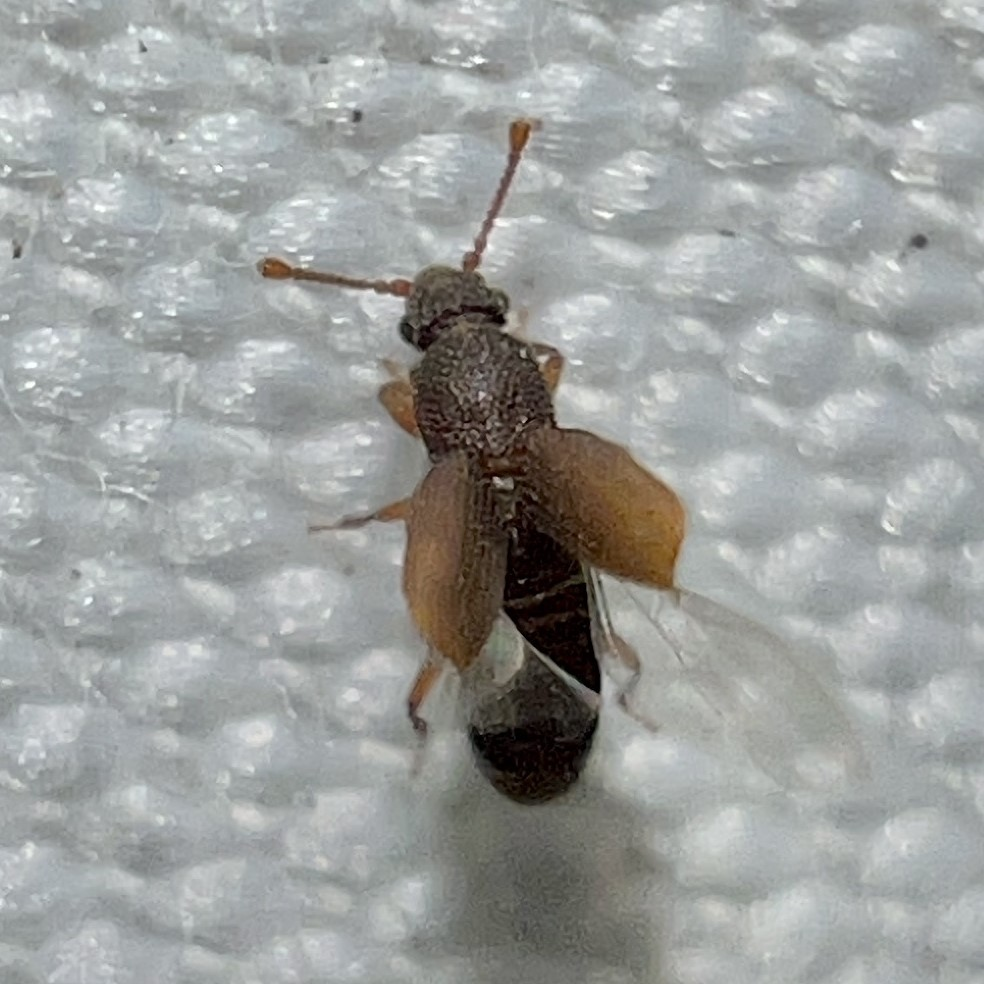

Scientific classification
- Kingdom: Animalia
- Phylum: Arthropoda
- Class: Insecta
- Order: Coleoptera
- Suborder: Polyphaga
- Infraorder: Cucujiformia
- Family: Monotomidae
- Genus: Monotoma
- Species: M. americana

Binomial name
- Monotoma americana Aubé, 1837

Synonyms
- Monotoma corpulenta Motschulsky, 1868

= Monotoma americana =

Species of beetle

Monotoma americana is a species of root-eating beetle in the family Monotomidae. It is found in North America.
