= Hesperobaenus abbreviatus =

Scientific classification
- Kingdom: Animalia
- Phylum: Arthropoda
- Clade: Pancrustacea
- Class: Insecta
- Order: Coleoptera
- Suborder: Polyphaga
- Infraorder: Cucujiformia
- Family: Monotomidae
- Genus: Hesperobaenus
- Species: H. abbreviatus

Binomial name
- Hesperobaenus abbreviatus (Motschulsky, 1845)

Synonyms
- Hesperobaenus arizonicus Casey, 1916

Species of beetle

Hesperobaenus abbreviatus is a species of root-eating beetle in the family Monotomidae. It is found in North America.

== Description ==
Adults measure 2.0 to 2.8 millimetres in length. Most have a reddish-brown head and thorax, with the front half of the elytra distinctly paler than the rear half. Colour varies, and some specimens have uniformly pale or dark elytra. The pronotum is approximately as long as it is wide, with its front corners usually projecting slightly sideways.

== Distribution and habitat ==
The species ranges from southern British Columbia to southern California, extending eastwards to Idaho, Colorado and New Mexico. Bousquet regarded a reported occurrence in Dallas, Texas, as doubtful. It is found mainly beneath the bark of dead trees; specimen records include collections beneath alder, oak, pine and hackberry bark.
