= Monotoma arida =

Scientific classification
- Domain: Eukaryota
- Kingdom: Animalia
- Phylum: Arthropoda
- Class: Insecta
- Order: Coleoptera
- Suborder: Polyphaga
- Infraorder: Cucujiformia
- Family: Monotomidae
- Genus: Monotoma
- Species: M. arida

Binomial name
- Monotoma arida Casey, 1916

Synonyms
- Monotoma avara Blatchley, 1928

Species of beetle

Monotoma arida is a species of root-eating beetle in the family Monotomidae. It is found in North America.
