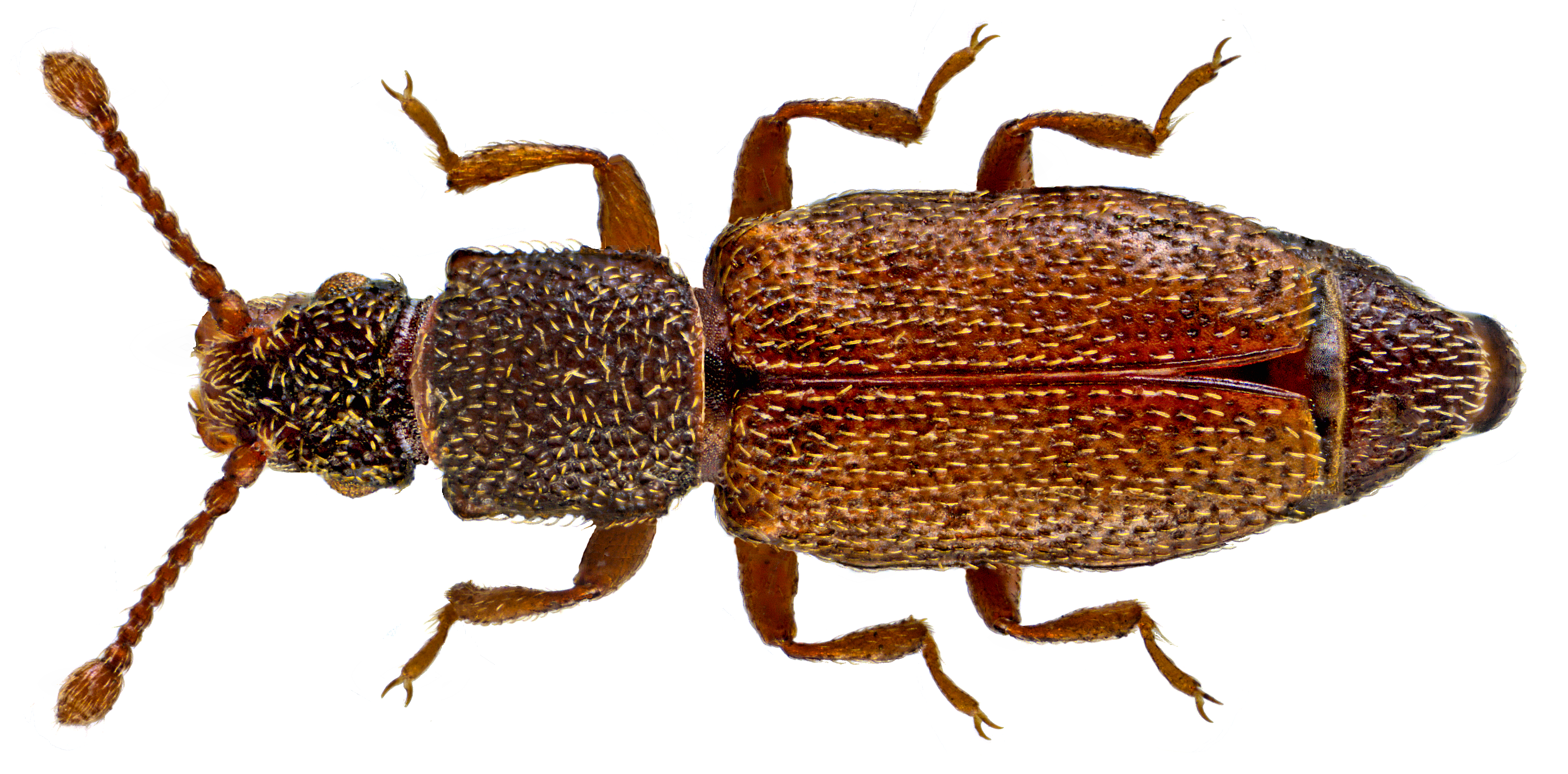

Scientific classification
- Domain: Eukaryota
- Kingdom: Animalia
- Phylum: Arthropoda
- Class: Insecta
- Order: Coleoptera
- Suborder: Polyphaga
- Infraorder: Cucujiformia
- Family: Monotomidae
- Genus: Monotoma
- Species: M. bicolor

Binomial name
- Monotoma bicolor A. Villa & G. Villa, 1835

Synonyms
- Monotoma parallela LeConte, 1855

= Monotoma bicolor =

Species of beetle

Monotoma bicolor is a species of root-eating beetle in the family Monotomidae. It is found in Africa, Australia, Europe and Northern Asia (excluding China), and North America.
