= Thione =

Thione may refer to:

- Thione (chemistry), or thioketone, the organosulfur analog of ketone
- Thione (beetle), a genus in the family Monotomidae
- Thione Seck (born 1955), Senegalese musician
