= Europs pallipennis =

Scientific classification
- Kingdom: Animalia
- Phylum: Arthropoda
- Class: Insecta
- Order: Coleoptera
- Suborder: Polyphaga
- Infraorder: Cucujiformia
- Family: Monotomidae
- Genus: Europs
- Species: E. pallipennis

Binomial name
- Europs pallipennis (LeConte, 1861)

Species of beetle

Europs pallipennis is a species in the family Monotomidae ("root-eating beetles"), in the suborder Polyphaga ("water, rove, scarab, long-horned, leaf and snout beetles"). It is found in North America.
