= Monotopion =

Monotopion ferrugineus

Scientific classification
- Kingdom: Animalia
- Phylum: Arthropoda
- Class: Insecta
- Order: Coleoptera
- Suborder: Polyphaga
- Infraorder: Cucujiformia
- Family: Monotomidae
- Genus: Monotopion; Reitter, 1884
- Species: M. ferrugineus

Binomial name
- Monotopion ferrugineus Reitter, 1884

Genus of beetles

Monotopion ferrugineus is a species of beetles in the family Monotomidae, the only species in the genus Monotopion.
