= Arunus =

Scientific classification
- Kingdom: Animalia
- Phylum: Arthropoda
- Class: Insecta
- Order: Hymenoptera
- Family: Eulophidae
- Genus: Arunus; Sen Gupta & Pal, 1995

Genus of beetles

Arunus is a genus of beetles in the family Monotomidae, containing the following species:

- Arunus magnus Sen Gupta & Pal, 1995
- Arunus tenuis Sen Gupta & Pal, 1995
