= Mimemodes =

Scientific classification
- Kingdom: Animalia
- Phylum: Arthropoda
- Class: Insecta
- Order: Coleoptera
- Suborder: Polyphaga
- Infraorder: Cucujiformia
- Family: Monotomidae
- Genus: Mimemodes; Reitter, 1876

Genus of beetles

Mimemodes is a genus of beetles in the family Monotomidae, containing the following species:

- Mimemodes bhutus Sen Gupta, 1976
- Mimemodes carenifrons Grouvelle, 1913
- Mimemodes cribratus Reitter, 1874
- Mimemodes emmerichi Mader, 1937
- Mimemodes frigidus Grouvelle, 1906
- Mimemodes harmandi (Grouvelle, 1903)
- Mimemodes insulare Grouvelle, 1897
- Mimemodes japonus Reitter, 1874
- Mimemodes kimbhutus Sen Gupta, 1976
- Mimemodes koebelei Blackburn, 1902
- Mimemodes laticeps (Macleay, 1871)
- Mimemodes megalocephalus Champion, 1924
- Mimemodes monstrosum (Reitter, 1874)
- Mimemodes nigratus Sen Gupta, 1976
- Mimemodes proximus Grouvelle, 1913
