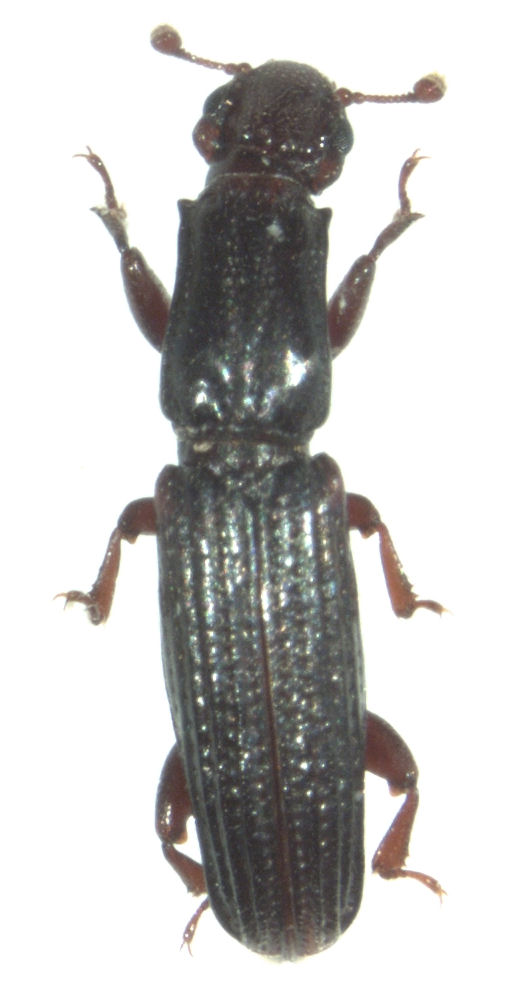

Scientific classification
- Kingdom: Animalia
- Phylum: Arthropoda
- Class: Insecta
- Order: Coleoptera
- Suborder: Polyphaga
- Infraorder: Cucujiformia
- Family: Monotomidae
- Subfamily: Lenacinae
- Tribe: Lenacini
- Genus: Lenax; Sharp, 1877
- Species: L. mirandus

Binomial name
- Lenax mirandus Sharp, 1877

= Lenax (beetle) =

Genus of beetles

Lenax mirandus is a species of beetles in the family Monotomidae, the only extant species in the genus Lenax. It is endemic to New Zealand. This genus also includes extinct species Lenax karenae known from Cretaceous Burmese amber from Myanmar.
