= Indoleptipsius =

Indoleptipsius ushae

Scientific classification
- Kingdom: Animalia
- Phylum: Arthropoda
- Class: Insecta
- Order: Coleoptera
- Suborder: Polyphaga
- Infraorder: Cucujiformia
- Family: Monotomidae
- Genus: Indoleptipsius; Pal, 2000
- Species: I. ushae

Binomial name
- Indoleptipsius ushae Pal, 1996

Genus of beetles

Indoleptipsius ushae is a species of beetles in the family Monotomidae, the only species in the genus Indoleptipsius.
