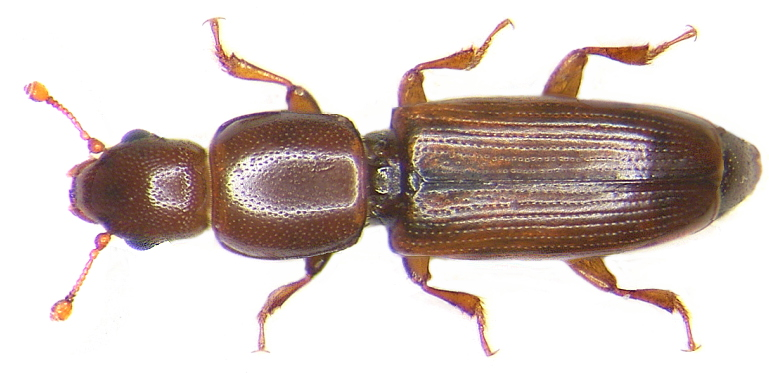
- Rhizophagus depressus

Scientific classification
- Kingdom: Animalia
- Phylum: Arthropoda
- Clade: Pancrustacea
- Class: Insecta
- Order: Coleoptera
- Suborder: Polyphaga
- Infraorder: Cucujiformia
- Family: Monotomidae
- Genus: Rhizophagus; Herbst, 1793

Synonyms
- Cyanostolus Ganglbauer, 1899

= Rhizophagus (beetle) =

Genus of beetles

Rhizophagus is a genus of beetles in the family Monotomidae.

== Species ==
- Rhizophagus aeneus Richter, 1820
- Rhizophagus approximatus LeConte, 1866
- Rhizophagus atticus Tozer, 1968
- Rhizophagus beasoni Sen Gupta & De, 1988
- Rhizophagus bipustulatus (Fabricius, 1792)
- Rhizophagus brancsiki Reitter, 1905
- Rhizophagus brunneus Horn, 1879
- Rhizophagus championi Sen Gupta & De, 1988
- Rhizophagus cribratus (Gyllenhal, 1827)
- Rhizophagus cylindricus Stephens, 1830
- Rhizophagus depressus (Fabricius, 1792)
- Rhizophagus dimidiatus Mannerheim, 1843
- Rhizophagus dispar (Paykull, 1800)
- Rhizophagus ferrugineus (Paykull, 1800)
- Rhizophagus galbus Bousquet, 1990
- Rhizophagus ghumus Sen Gupta & De, 1988
- Rhizophagus grandis Gyllenhal, 1827
- Rhizophagus grouvellei Méquignon, 1913
- Rhizophagus indicus (Méquignon, 1913)
- Rhizophagus intermedius Apfelbeck, 1916
- Rhizophagus japonicus Reitter, 1884
- Rhizophagus kali Sen Gupta & De, 1988
- Rhizophagus lineatus Sen Gupta & De, 1988
- Rhizophagus longiceps Casey, 1916
- Rhizophagus microps Jelínek, 1984
- Rhizophagus minutus Mannerheim, 1853
- Rhizophagus nitidulus (Fabricius, 1798)
- Rhizophagus nobilis (Lewis, 1893)
- Rhizophagus oblongicollis Blatch & Horner, 1892
- Rhizophagus pahalgamus Sen Gupta & Biswas, 1977
- Rhizophagus paralellicollis Gyllenhal, 1827
- Rhizophagus parviceps Reitter, 1884
- Rhizophagus parvulus (Paykull, 1800)
- Rhizophagus perforatus Erichson, 1845
- Rhizophagus picipes (Olivier, 1790)
- Rhizophagus pratapi Sen Gupta & De, 1988
- Rhizophagus procerus Casey, 1884
- Rhizophagus protensus Reitter, 1890
- Rhizophagus pseudobrunneus Bousquet, 1990
- Rhizophagus puncticollis (Sahlberg, 1837)
- Rhizophagus pusillus Bousquet, 1990
- Rhizophagus remotus LeConte, 1866
- Rhizophagus rufus Stephens, 1830
- Rhizophagus sayi Schaeffer, 1913
- Rhizophagus sculpturatus Mannerheim, 1842
- Rhizophagus similaris Reitter, 1876
- Rhizophagus simplex Reitter, 1884
- Rhizophagus singularis Sen Gupta & De, 1988
- Rhizophagus subtilis Reitter, 1872
- Rhizophagus subvillosus Reitter, 1884
- Rhizophagus suturalis Jelinek, 1965
- Rhizophagus unicolor (Lucas, 1846)
- Rhizophagus ussuriensis Nikitsky, 1984
