= Tarunius =

Tarunius punctatus

Scientific classification
- Kingdom: Animalia
- Phylum: Arthropoda
- Class: Insecta
- Order: Coleoptera
- Suborder: Polyphaga
- Infraorder: Cucujiformia
- Family: Monotomidae
- Genus: Tarunius; Sen Gupta, 1977
- Species: T. punctatus

Binomial name
- Tarunius punctatus Sen Gupta, 1977

Genus of beetles

Tarunius punctatus is a species of beetles in the family Monotomidae, the only species in the genus Tarunius.
