= Renuka (beetle) =

Scientific classification
- Domain: Eukaryota
- Kingdom: Animalia
- Phylum: Arthropoda
- Class: Insecta
- Order: Coleoptera
- Suborder: Polyphaga
- Infraorder: Cucujiformia
- Superfamily: Cucujoidea
- Family: Monotomidae
- Genus: Renuka; Sen Gupta, 1988

Genus of beetles

Renuka is a genus of beetles in the family Monotomidae, containing the following species:

- Renuka madagascarensis Pal, 2000
- Renuka rita Sen Gupta, 1988
