= Dasyspora =

Scientific classification
- Kingdom: Fungi
- Division: Basidiomycota
- Class: Pucciniomycetes
- Order: Pucciniales
- Family: Uropyxidaceae
- Genus: Dasyspora; Berk. & M.A.Curtis (1854)

Type species
- Dasyspora foveolata Berk. & M.A.Curtis (1853)

Synonyms
- Sartvellia Berk. (1857)

Genus of fungi

Dasyspora is a genus of rust fungi in the family Uropyxidaceae.

== Species ==
- Dasyspora amazonica
- Dasyspora echinata
- Dasyspora emarginatae
- Dasyspora ferrugineae
- Dasyspora frutescentis
- Dasyspora geranii-silvatici
- Dasyspora gregaria
- Dasyspora guianensis
- Dasyspora malvacearum
- Dasyspora mesoamericana
- Dasyspora nitidae
- Dasyspora segregaria
- Dasyspora winteri
