= Rhizophagoides =

Rhizophagoides kojimai

Scientific classification
- Kingdom: Animalia
- Phylum: Arthropoda
- Class: Insecta
- Order: Coleoptera
- Suborder: Polyphaga
- Infraorder: Cucujiformia
- Family: Monotomidae
- Genus: Rhizophagoides; Nakane & Hisamatsu, 1963
- Species: R. kojimai

Binomial name
- Rhizophagoides kojimai Nakane & Hisamatsu, 1963

Genus of beetles

Rhizophagoides kojimai is a species of beetles in the family Monotomidae, the only species in the genus Rhizophagoides.
