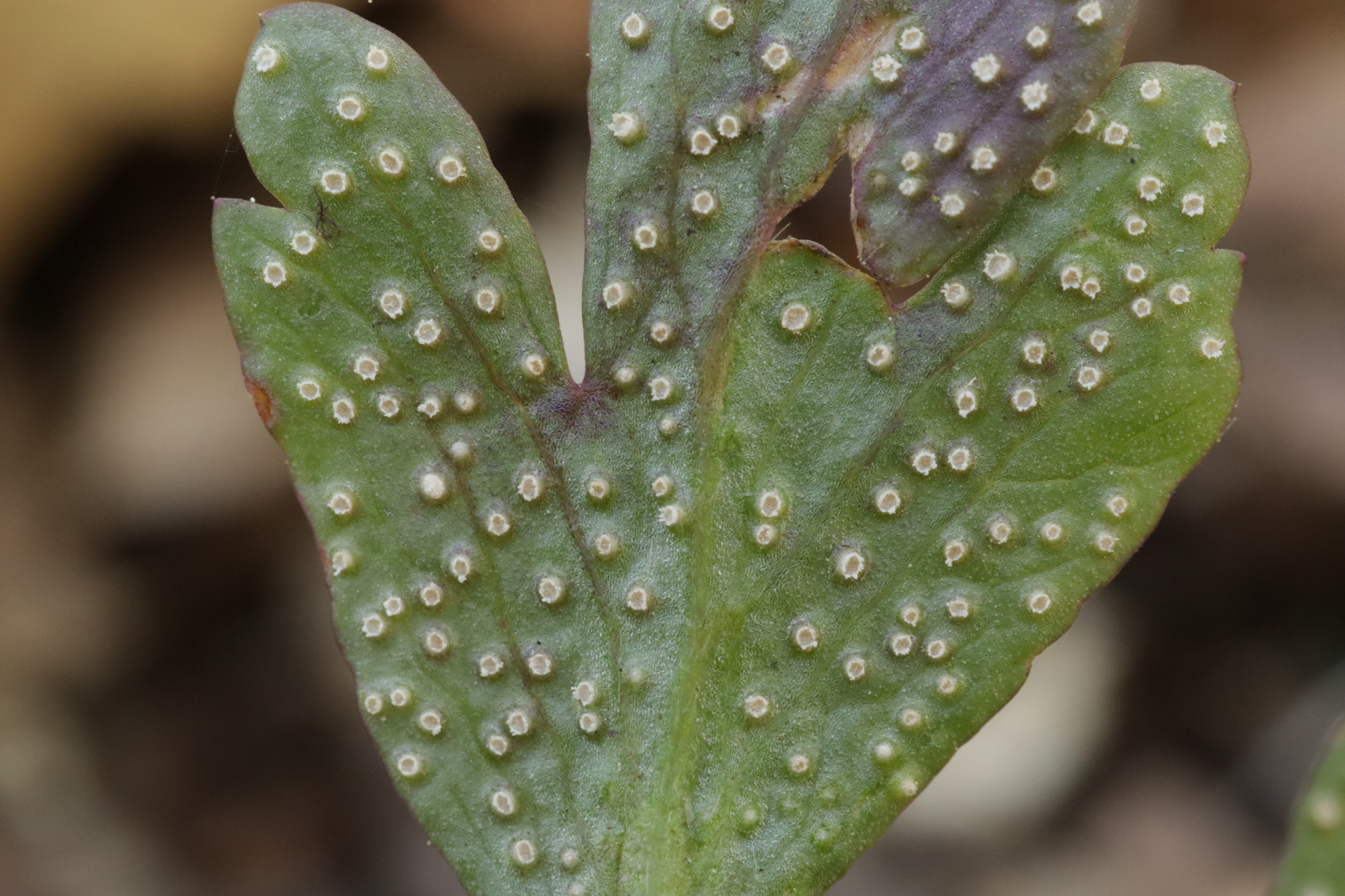
- Ochropsora anemones, formerly Ochropsora ariae, on leaf of Anemone nemorosa

Scientific classification
- Domain: Eukaryota
- Kingdom: Fungi
- Division: Basidiomycota
- Class: Pucciniomycetes
- Order: Pucciniales
- Family: Uropyxidaceae
- Genus: Ochropsora; Dietel

= Ochropsora =

Genus of fungi

Ochropsora is a genus of fungi belonging to the family Uropyxidaceae.

The species of this genus are found in Eurasia and Northern America.

Species:

- Ochropsora ariae (Fuckel) Ramsb.
- Ochropsora daisenensis T.Hirats. & S.Uchida
- Ochropsora nambuana (Henn.) Dietel
