= Monotomopsis =

Scientific classification
- Kingdom: Animalia
- Phylum: Arthropoda
- Class: Insecta
- Order: Coleoptera
- Suborder: Polyphaga
- Infraorder: Cucujiformia
- Family: Monotomidae
- Genus: Monotomopsis; Grouvelle, 1896

Genus of beetles

Monotomopsis is a genus of beetles in the family Monotomidae, containing the following species:

- Monotomopsis andrewesi Grouvelle, 1908
- Monotomopsis monotomoides Grouvelle, 1896
