= Malinica =

Malinica ranjana

Scientific classification
- Kingdom: Animalia
- Phylum: Arthropoda
- Class: Insecta
- Order: Coleoptera
- Suborder: Polyphaga
- Infraorder: Cucujiformia
- Family: Monotomidae
- Genus: Malinica; Sen Gupta, 1988
- Species: M. ranjana

Binomial name
- Malinica ranjana Sen Gupta, 1988

Genus of beetles

Malinica ranjana is a species of beetles in the family Monotomidae, the only species in the genus Malinica.
