= Noveurops =

Noveurops philippinensis

Scientific classification
- Kingdom: Animalia
- Phylum: Arthropoda
- Class: Insecta
- Order: Coleoptera
- Suborder: Polyphaga
- Infraorder: Cucujiformia
- Family: Monotomidae
- Genus: Noveurops; Sen Gupta & Pal, 1995
- Species: N. philippinensis

Binomial name
- Noveurops philippinensis Sen Gupta & Pal, 1995

Genus of beetles

Noveurops philippinensis is a species of beetle in the family Monotomidae, the only species in the genus Noveurops.
