= Kakamodes =

Kakamodes occipitalis

Scientific classification
- Kingdom: Animalia
- Phylum: Arthropoda
- Class: Insecta
- Order: Coleoptera
- Suborder: Polyphaga
- Infraorder: Cucujiformia
- Family: Monotomidae
- Genus: Kakamodes; Sen Gupta & Pal, 1995
- Species: K. occipitalis

Binomial name
- Kakamodes occipitalis Sen Gupta & Pal, 1995

Genus of beetles

Kakamodes occipitalis is a species of beetles in the family Monotomidae, the only species in the genus Kakamodes.
