= Rumnicus =

Rumnicus costatus

Scientific classification
- Kingdom: Animalia
- Phylum: Arthropoda
- Class: Insecta
- Order: Coleoptera
- Suborder: Polyphaga
- Infraorder: Cucujiformia
- Family: Monotomidae
- Genus: Rumnicus; Sen Gupta & Pal, 1995
- Species: R. costatus

Binomial name
- Rumnicus costatus Sen Gupta & Pal, 1995

Genus of beetles

Rumnicus costatus is a species of beetles in the family Monotomidae, the only species in the genus Rumnicus.
