= Pararhizophagus =

Pararhizophagus grouvellei

Scientific classification
- Kingdom: Animalia
- Phylum: Arthropoda
- Class: Insecta
- Order: Coleoptera
- Suborder: Polyphaga
- Infraorder: Cucujiformia
- Family: Monotomidae
- Genus: Pararhizophagus; Méquignon, 1913
- Species: P. grouvellei

Binomial name
- Pararhizophagus grouvellei Méquignon, 1913

Genus of beetles

Pararhizophagus grouvellei is a species of beetles in the family Monotomidae, the only species in the genus Pararhizophagus.
