= Eporus =

Eporus insignis

Scientific classification
- Kingdom: Animalia
- Phylum: Arthropoda
- Class: Insecta
- Order: Coleoptera
- Suborder: Polyphaga
- Infraorder: Cucujiformia
- Family: Monotomidae
- Genus: Eporus; Grouvelle, 1897
- Species: E. insignis

Binomial name
- Eporus insignis Grouvelle, 1897

Genus of beetles

Eporus insignis is a species of beetles in the family Monotomidae, the only species in the genus Eporus.
