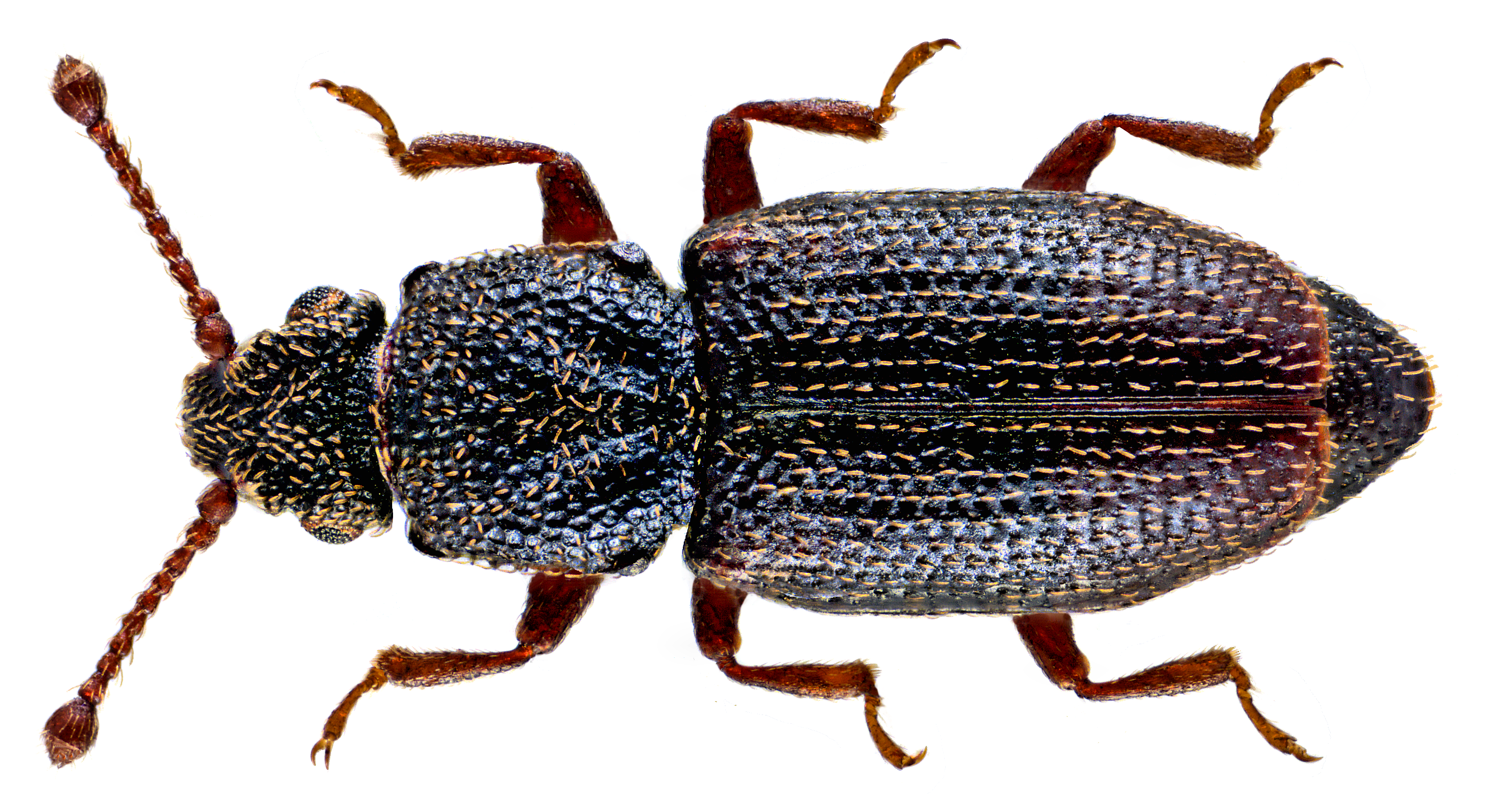
- Monotoma brevicollis

Scientific classification
- Kingdom: Animalia
- Phylum: Arthropoda
- Class: Insecta
- Order: Coleoptera
- Suborder: Polyphaga
- Infraorder: Cucujiformia
- Family: Monotomidae
- Subfamily: Monotominae
- Genus: Monotoma; Herbst, 1793

= Monotoma =

Genus of beetles

Monotoma is a genus of beetles in the family Monotomidae, containing the following species:

- Monotoma aegyptiaca Motschulsky, 1868
- Monotoma affinis Nikitsky, 1986
- Monotoma americana Aubé, 1837
- Monotoma angusticeps Reitter, 1911
- Monotoma angusticollis Gyllenhal, 1827
- Monotoma arida Casey, 1916
- Monotoma bicolor A. Villa & G.B. Villa, 1835
- Monotoma brevicollis Aubé, 1837
- Monotoma centralis Sharp, 1900
- Monotoma conicicollis Guérin-Méneville, 1837
- Monotoma conicithorax Reitter, 1891
- Monotoma diecki Reitter, 1877
- Monotoma emarginata Bousquet & Laplante, 2000
- Monotoma gotzi Holzschuh & Lohse, 1981
- Monotoma hindustana Motschulsky, 1868
- Monotoma hoffmanni Hinton & Ancona, 1935
- Monotoma inseriata Reitter, 1901
- Monotoma johnsoni Bousquet & Laplante, 2000
- Monotoma latridioides Sharp, 1900
- Monotoma longicollis Gyllenhal, 1827
- Monotoma madagascariensis Grouvelle, 1906
- Monotoma malyi Obenberger, 1914
- Monotoma mucida LeConte, 1855
- Monotoma munda Sharp, 1900
- Monotoma myrmecophila Bousquet & Laplante, 2000
- Monotoma perplexa Rey, 1889
- Monotoma picipes Herbst, 1793
- Monotoma producta LeConte, 1855
- Monotoma punctata Ragusa, 1892
- Monotoma punctaticollis Aubé, 1843
- Monotoma pusilla Sharp, 1900
- Monotoma quadricollis Aubé, 1837
- Monotoma quadrifoveolata Motschulsky, 1837
- Monotoma quadriimpressa Motschulsky, 1845
- Monotoma rhodeana Casey, 1916
- Monotoma rondanii Villa & Villa, 1833
- Monotoma seriata Reitter, 1901
- Monotoma specialis Nikitsky, 1985
- Monotoma spinicollis Aubé, 1837
- Monotoma subquadrifoveolata Waterhouse, 1858
- Monotoma testacea Motschulsky, 1845
- Monotoma texana Horn, 1879
- Monotoma uhligi Pal, 2000
