= Hiekesia =

Hiekesia africana

Scientific classification
- Kingdom: Animalia
- Phylum: Arthropoda
- Class: Insecta
- Order: Coleoptera
- Suborder: Polyphaga
- Infraorder: Cucujiformia
- Family: Monotomidae
- Genus: Hiekesia; Sen Gupta & Pal, 1995
- Species: H. africana

Binomial name
- Hiekesia africana Sen Gupta & Pal, 1995

Genus of beetles

Hiekesia africana is a species of beetles in the family Monotomidae, the only species in the genus Hiekesia.
