= Shoguna =

Scientific classification
- Kingdom: Animalia
- Phylum: Arthropoda
- Class: Insecta
- Order: Coleoptera
- Suborder: Polyphaga
- Infraorder: Cucujiformia
- Family: Monotomidae
- Genus: Shoguna; Lewis, 1884

Genus of beetles

Shoguna is a genus of beetles in the family Monotomidae, containing the following species:

- Shoguna chlorotica (Fairmaire, 1886)
- Shoguna feae Grouvelle, 1896
- Shoguna longiceps (Grouvelle, 1896)
- Shoguna rufotestacea Lewis, 1884
- Shoguna sicardi Grouvelle, 1906
- Shoguna striata Arrow, 1900
- Shoguna termitiformis (Fairmaire, 1883)
