= Malabica =

Malabica tatai

Scientific classification
- Kingdom: Animalia
- Phylum: Arthropoda
- Class: Insecta
- Order: Coleoptera
- Suborder: Polyphaga
- Infraorder: Cucujiformia
- Family: Monotomidae
- Genus: Malabica; Sen Gupta, 1988
- Species: M. tatai

Binomial name
- Malabica tatai Sen Gupta, 1988

Genus of beetles

Malabica tatai is a species of beetles in the family Monotomidae, the only species in the genus Malabica.
