= Crowsonius =

Scientific classification
- Kingdom: Animalia
- Phylum: Arthropoda
- Class: Insecta
- Order: Coleoptera
- Suborder: Polyphaga
- Infraorder: Cucujiformia
- Family: Monotomidae
- Genus: Crowsonius; Pakaluk & Slipinski, 1993

Genus of beetles

Crowsonius is a genus of beetles in the family Monotomidae, containing the following species:

- Crowsonius meliponae Pakaluk & Slipinski, 1993
- Crowsonius parensis Pakaluk & Slipinski, 1995
- Crowsonius similis Pakaluk & Slipinski, 1993
