= Barunius =

Barunius pacificus

Scientific classification
- Kingdom: Animalia
- Phylum: Arthropoda
- Class: Insecta
- Order: Coleoptera
- Suborder: Polyphaga
- Infraorder: Cucujiformia
- Family: Monotomidae
- Genus: Barunius; Sen Gupta & Pal, 1995
- Species: B. pacificus

Binomial name
- Barunius pacificus Sen Gupta & Pal, 1995

Genus of beetles

Barunius pacificus is a species of beetles in the family Monotomidae, the only species in the genus Barunius.
