= Afrobaenus =

Afrobaenus mandibularis

Scientific classification
- Kingdom: Animalia
- Phylum: Arthropoda
- Class: Insecta
- Order: Coleoptera
- Suborder: Polyphaga
- Infraorder: Cucujiformia
- Family: Monotomidae
- Genus: Afrobaenus; Sen Gupta & Pal, 1995
- Species: A. mandibularis

Binomial name
- Afrobaenus mandibularis Sen Gupta & Pal, 1995

Genus of beetles

Afrobaenus mandibularis is a species of beetles in the family Monotomidae, the only species in the genus Afrobaenus.
