= Mimema (fungus) =

Scientific classification
- Kingdom: Fungi
- Division: Basidiomycota
- Class: Pucciniomycetes
- Order: Pucciniales
- Family: Uropyxidaceae
- Genus: Mimema; H.S. Jacks.

Genus of fungi

Mimema is a genus of plant rusts. Mimema venturae has been reported as a parasite of Dalbergia miscolobium.
