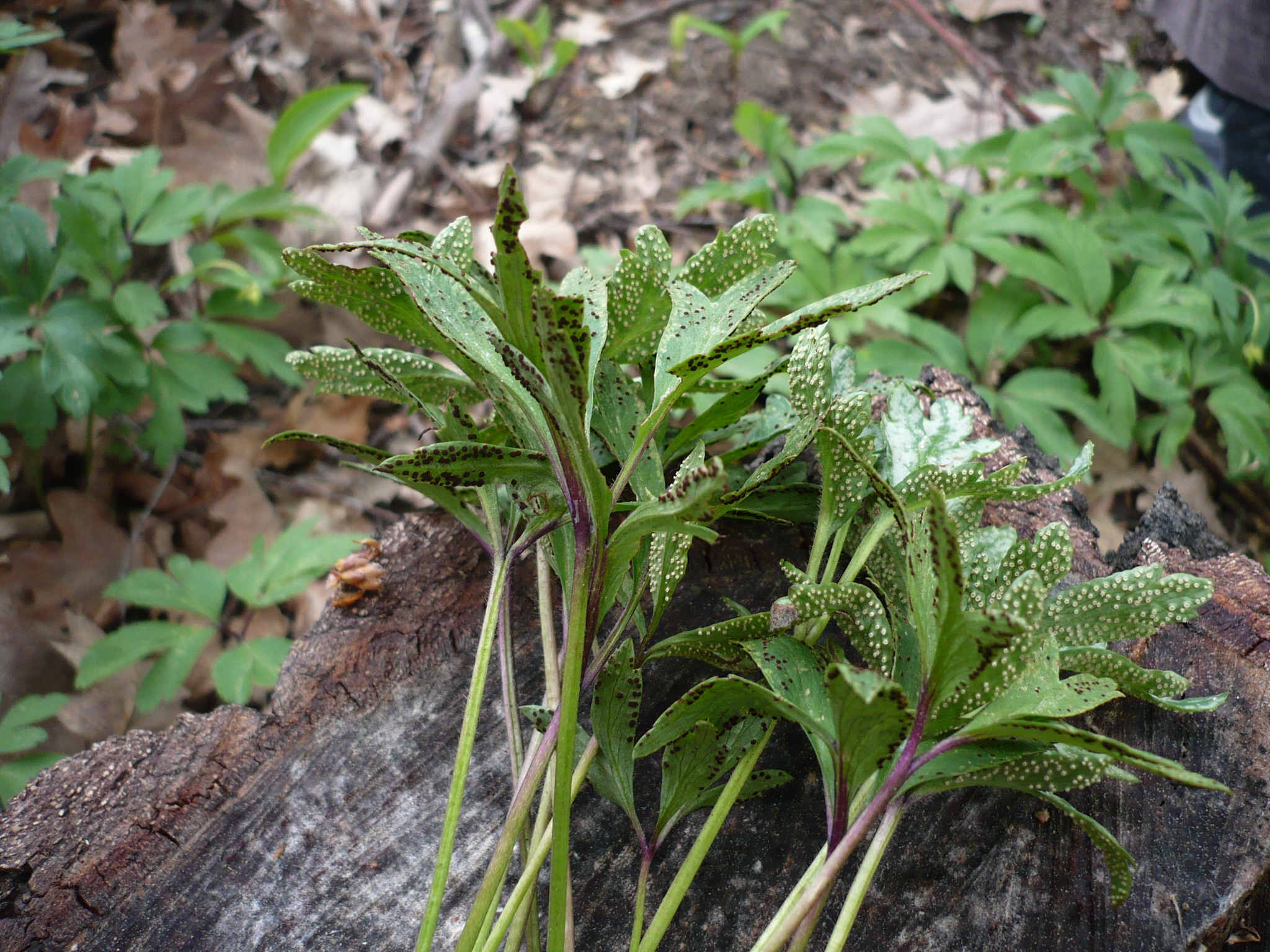
- Tranzschelia pruni-spinosae on Anemone sp.

Scientific classification
- Kingdom: Fungi
- Division: Basidiomycota
- Class: Pucciniomycetes
- Order: Pucciniales
- Family: Uropyxidaceae (Arthur) Cummins & Y.Hirats. (1983)

Type genus
- Uropyxis J.Schröt. (1875)

= Uropyxidaceae =

Family of fungi

The Uropyxidaceae are a family of rust fungi in the order Pucciniales. The family contains 15 genera and 149 species.

== Genera ==
- Dasyspora
- Didymopsorella
- Dipyxis
- Kimuromyces
- Leucotelium
- Macruropyxis
- Mimema
- Ochropsora
- Phragmopyxis
- Poliomopsis
- Porotenus
- Prospodium
- Sorataea
- Tranzschelia
- Uropyxis
