= Pycnotomina =

Pycnotomina cavicolle

Scientific classification
- Kingdom: Animalia
- Phylum: Arthropoda
- Class: Insecta
- Order: Coleoptera
- Suborder: Polyphaga
- Infraorder: Cucujiformia
- Family: Monotomidae
- Tribe: Europini
- Genus: Pycnotomina; Casey, 1916
- Species: P. cavicolle

Binomial name
- Pycnotomina cavicolle (Horn, 1879)

Genus of beetles

Pycnotomina cavicolle is a species of beetles in the family Monotomidae, the only species in the genus Pycnotomina.
