= Aneurops =

Scientific classification
- Kingdom: Animalia
- Phylum: Arthropoda
- Class: Insecta
- Order: Coleoptera
- Suborder: Polyphaga
- Infraorder: Cucujiformia
- Family: Monotomidae
- Tribe: Europini
- Genus: Aneurops; Sharp, 1900

Genus of beetles

Aneurops is a genus of beetles in the family Monotomidae, containing the following species:

- Aneurops championi Sharp, 1900
- Aneurops convergens (Sharp, 1900)
