= Mimema (beetle) =

Scientific classification
- Kingdom: Animalia
- Phylum: Arthropoda
- Clade: Pancrustacea
- Class: Insecta
- Order: Coleoptera
- Suborder: Polyphaga
- Infraorder: Cucujiformia
- Family: Monotomidae
- Genus: Mimema; Wollaston, 1861

Genus of beetles

Mimema is a genus of beetles in the family Monotomidae, containing the following species:

- Mimema pallidum Wollaston, 1861
- Mimema tricolor Wollaston, 1861
