= Hesperobaenus =

Scientific classification
- Kingdom: Animalia
- Phylum: Arthropoda
- Class: Insecta
- Order: Coleoptera
- Suborder: Polyphaga
- Infraorder: Cucujiformia
- Family: Monotomidae
- Tribe: Europini
- Genus: Hesperobaenus; J.LeConte, 1861

Genus of beetles

Hesperobaenus is a genus of beetles in the family Monotomidae, containing the following species:

- Hesperobaenus abbreviatus (Motschulsky, 1845)
- Hesperobaenus alternatus Schaeffer, 1910
- Hesperobaenus constricticollis Bousquet, 2002
- Hesperobaenus fenyesi Van Dyke, 1945
- Hesperobaenus humeralis (Fairmaire, 1850)
- Hesperobaenus lineellus (Reitter, 1872)
- Hesperobaenus rufipes LeConte, 1863
- Hesperobaenus stipes Sharp, 1900
- Hesperobaenus subtestaceus (Reitter, 1876)
- Hesperobaenus unicolor (Casey, 1916)
