= Bactridium =

Scientific classification
- Kingdom: Animalia
- Phylum: Arthropoda
- Class: Insecta
- Order: Coleoptera
- Suborder: Polyphaga
- Infraorder: Cucujiformia
- Family: Monotomidae
- Tribe: Europini
- Genus: Bactridium; LeConte, 1861

Genus of beetles

Bactridium is a genus of root-eating beetles in the family Monotomidae. There are about 18 described species in Bactridium.

== Species ==
These 29 species belong to the genus Bactridium:

- Bactridium adustum Reitter, 1873^{i c g}
- Bactridium angulicolle Reitter, 1873^{i c g}
- Bactridium angustum Sharp, 1900^{i c g}
- Bactridium atratum Reitter, 1876
- Bactridium brevicolle Reitter, 1876
- Bactridium californicum Fall, 1917^{i c g}
- Bactridium cephalotes (Pascoe, 1863)
- Bactridium convexulum Casey, 1916^{i c g}
- Bactridium cubaense Chevrolat, 1863^{i c g}
- Bactridium curtipenne Casey, 1916^{i c g}
- Bactridium divisum Sharp, 1900^{i c g}
- Bactridium ephippiger (Guérin-Méneville, 1837)
- Bactridium ephippigerum (Guerin-Meneville, 1829)^{i c g b}
- Bactridium erythropterum (Melsheimer, 1844)^{i c g b}
- Bactridium exiguum Grouvelle, 1908^{i c g}
- Bactridium flohri Sharp, 1900^{i c g}
- Bactridium fryi Horn, 1879
- Bactridium germanum Sharp, 1900^{i c g}
- Bactridium heydeni Reitter, 1873^{i c g}
- Bactridium hudsoni Casey, 1916^{i c g}
- Bactridium humile Grouvelle, 1906
- Bactridium insularis Van Dyke, 1953
- Bactridium nanus (Erichson, 1843)
- Bactridium obscurum Casey, 1916^{i c g b}
- Bactridium orientalis (Reitter, 1872)
- Bactridium parvum Grouvelle, 1906
- Bactridium quadricollis (Reitter, 1872)
- Bactridium rude Sharp, 1900^{i c g}
- Bactridium striolatum (Reitter, 1872)^{i c g b}

Data sources: i = ITIS, c = Catalogue of Life, g = GBIF, b = Bugguide.net
