= Leptipsius =

Scientific classification
- Kingdom: Animalia
- Phylum: Arthropoda
- Class: Insecta
- Order: Coleoptera
- Suborder: Polyphaga
- Infraorder: Cucujiformia
- Family: Monotomidae
- Tribe: Europini
- Genus: Leptipsius; Casey, 1916

Genus of beetles

Leptipsius is a genus of beetles in the family Monotomidae, containing the following species:

- Leptipsius brevicornis (Sharp, 1900)
- Leptipsius crassus Sharp, 1900
- Leptipsius dilutus Casey, 1916
- Leptipsius eumorphus Sharp, 1900
- Leptipsius imberbis Bousquet, 2003
- Leptipsius striatus LeConte, 1858
