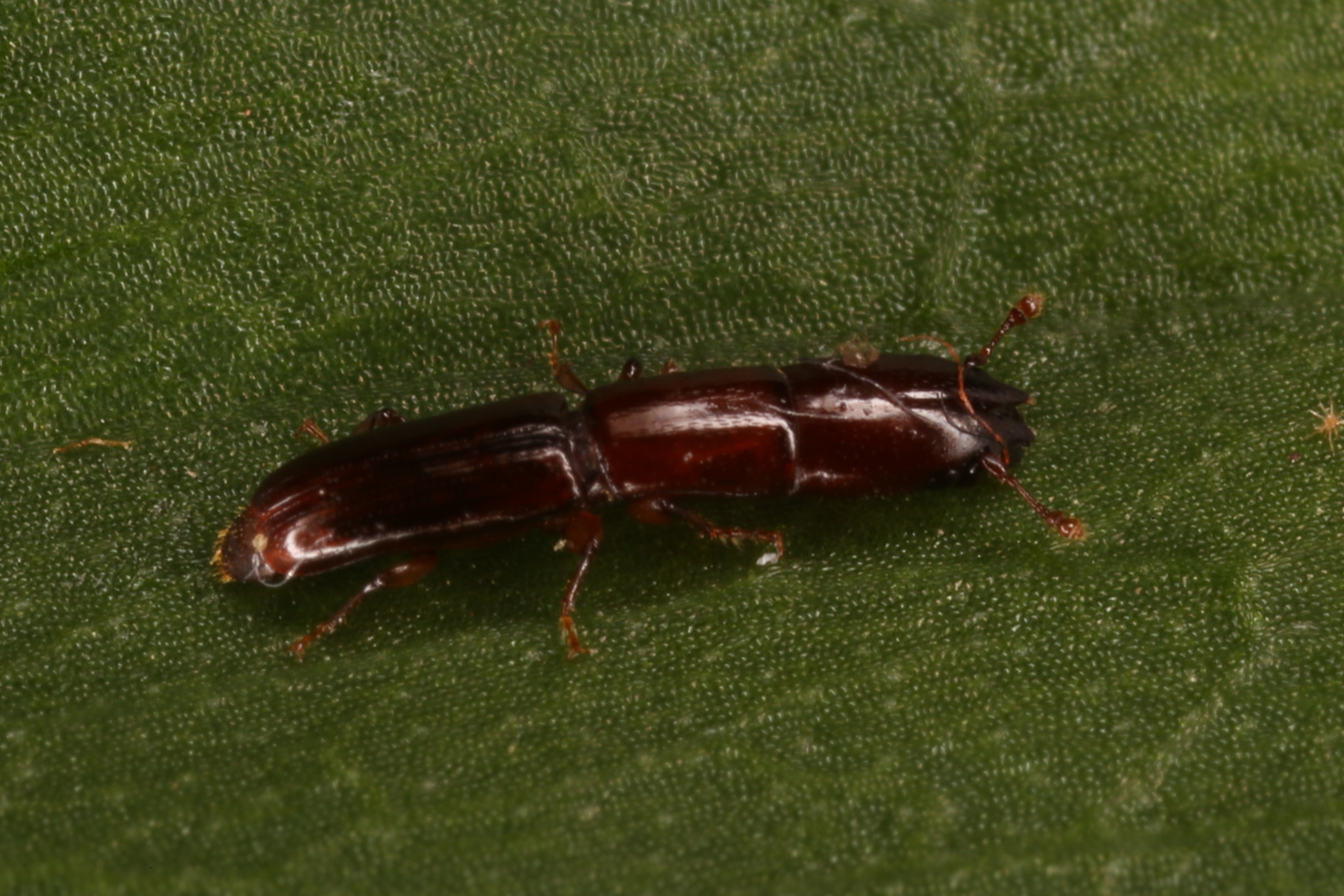
- Thione, Costa Rica

Scientific classification
- Kingdom: Animalia
- Phylum: Arthropoda
- Class: Insecta
- Order: Coleoptera
- Suborder: Polyphaga
- Infraorder: Cucujiformia
- Family: Monotomidae
- Tribe: Thionini
- Genus: Thione; Sharp, 1899
- Species: T. championi

Binomial name
- Thione championi Sharp, 1899

= Thione (beetle) =

Genus of beetles

Thione is a genus of beetles in the family Monotomidae, found in the Neotropics. Thione championi is found as far north as Florida, the only species found in North America.

== Species ==
- Thione cephalotes Sharp, 1899
- Thione championi Sharp, 1899
- Thione puncticeps Sharp, 1899

Species australis Kessel, 1921 and nigra Kessel, 1921, discovered in Australia, are now considered unplaced regarding genus.
