= Phyconomus =

Phyconomus marinum

Scientific classification
- Kingdom: Animalia
- Phylum: Arthropoda
- Class: Insecta
- Order: Coleoptera
- Suborder: Polyphaga
- Infraorder: Cucujiformia
- Family: Monotomidae
- Genus: Phyconomus; LeConte, 1861
- Species: P. marinum

Binomial name
- Phyconomus marinum (LeConte, 1858)

Genus of beetles

Phyconomus marinum is a species of beetles in the family Monotomidae, the only species in the genus Phyconomus.
