= Europs =

Scientific classification
- Kingdom: Animalia
- Phylum: Arthropoda
- Class: Insecta
- Order: Coleoptera
- Suborder: Polyphaga
- Infraorder: Cucujiformia
- Family: Monotomidae
- Genus: Europs; Wollaston, 1854

Genus of beetles

Europs is a genus of beetles in the family Monotomidae, containing the following species:

- Europs alutacea Champion, 1924
- Europs amabilis Grouvelle, 1899
- Europs apicalis Reitter, 1872
- Europs bilineatus Sharp, 1900
- Europs birmanica Grouvelle, 1897
- Europs brevis Grouvelle, 1896
- Europs calognathus Grouvelle, 1914
- Europs chilensis Grouvelle, 1896
- Europs cognatus Sharp, 1900
- Europs corticinus Grouvelle, 1896
- Europs crenicollis Grouvelle, 1906
- Europs depressus Grouvelle, 1896
- Europs diffusus Sharp, 1900
- Europs discedens Sharp, 1900
- Europs duplicatus Wollaston, 1862
- Europs euplectoides Sharp, 1900
- Europs fallax Grouvelle, 1902
- Europs fervida Blatchley, 1928
- Europs flavidus Bousquet, 2003
- Europs foveicollis Grouvelle & Raffray, 1908
- Europs frontalis Grouvelle, 1896
- Europs frugivorus Blatchley, 1928
- Europs germari Reitter, 1876
- Europs gestroi Grouvelle, 1906
- Europs horni Grouvelle, 1908
- Europs illaesus Sharp, 1900
- Europs impressicollis Wollaston, 1854
- Europs impressus Grouvelle, 1896
- Europs indica Grouvelle, 1903
- Europs kolbei Grouvelle, 1908
- Europs longulus Sharp, 1900
- Europs luridipennis (Reitter, 1876)
- Europs maculatus Grouvelle, 1896
- Europs mariae Grouvelle, 1906
- Europs multipunctatus Grouvelle, 1908
- Europs nanus Sharp, 1900
- Europs obtusus Sharp, 1900
- Europs oxytela Sharp, 1900
- Europs pallipennis (LeConte, 1861)
- Europs pumilio Sharp, 1900
- Europs raffrayi Grouvelle, 1896
- Europs rhizophagoides Reitter, 1872
- Europs simplex Sharp, 1900
- Europs sordidus Grouvelle, 1896
- Europs striatulus Fall in Fall & Cockerell, 1907
- Europs sulcicollis Bousquet, 2003
- Europs temporis Reitter, 1884
- Europs vicinus Grouvlle, 1896
- Europs wollastoni Reitter, 1872
- Europs zonatus Grouvelle, 1902
