= Macreurops =

Macreurops longicollis

Scientific classification
- Kingdom: Animalia
- Phylum: Arthropoda
- Class: Insecta
- Order: Coleoptera
- Suborder: Polyphaga
- Infraorder: Cucujiformia
- Family: Monotomidae
- Genus: Macreurops; Casey, 1916
- Species: M. longicollis

Binomial name
- Macreurops longicollis (Horn, 1879)

Genus of beetles

Macreurops longicollis is a species of beetles in the family Monotomidae, the only species in the genus Macreurops.
