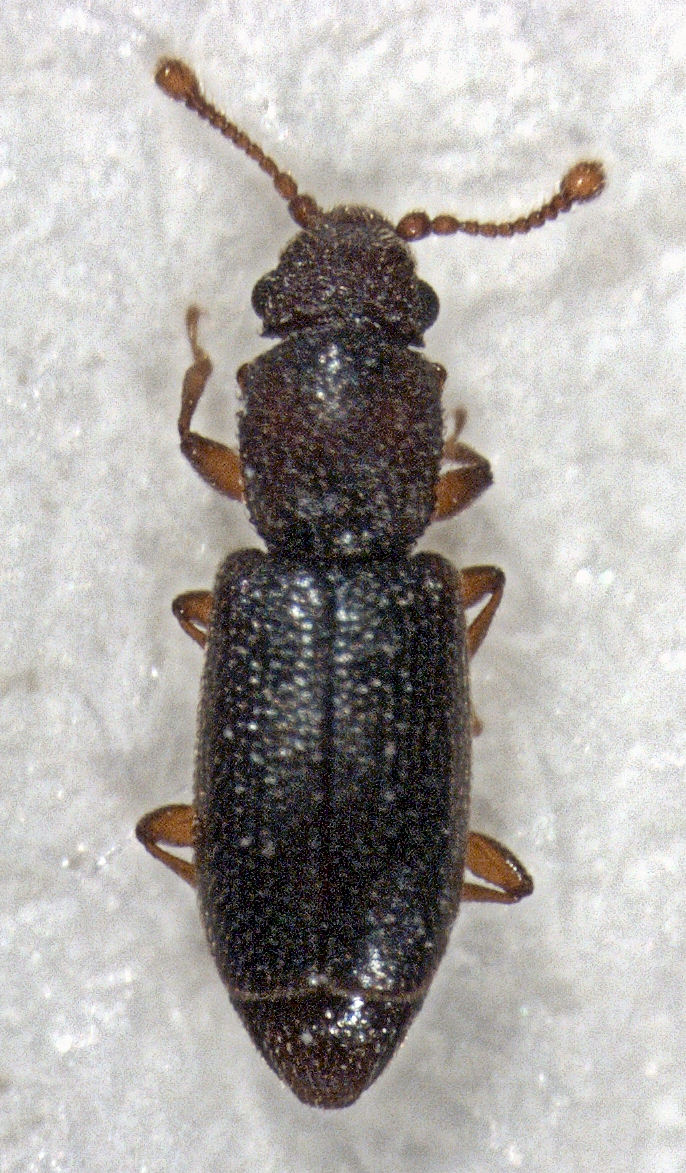
- Adult Monotoma longicollis

Scientific classification
- Kingdom: Animalia
- Phylum: Arthropoda
- Clade: Pancrustacea
- Class: Insecta
- Order: Coleoptera
- Suborder: Polyphaga
- Infraorder: Cucujiformia
- Superfamily: Cucujoidea
- Family: Monotomidae; Laporte, 1840

Genera
- See text

= Monotomidae =

Monotomidae Temporal range: Middle Jurassic–Recent

Family of beetles

Monotomidae is a family of beetles in the superfamily Cucujoidea. The family is found worldwide, with approximately 240 species in 33 genera. The ecological habits of the family are diverse, with different members of the group being found under tree bark, in decaying vegetation, on flowers and in ant nests. Their ecology is obscure, while at least some species are mycophagous, feeding on the fruiting bodies of ascomycete fungi, Rhyzophagus are predators on bark beetles (includings, eggs, larvae and young adults) and possibly Phoridae larvae, with the larvae of some species also being mycophagous.

== Taxonomy ==
Monotomidae contains the following genera:

- Rhizophaginae Redtenbacher 1845
  - Rhizophagus Herbst, 1793
- Subfamiliy Monotominae
  - Tribe Lenacini Crowson, 1952
    - Lenax Sharp, 1877
  - Tribe Monotomini Laporte, 1840
    - Monotoma Herbst, 1793
  - Tribe Thionini Crowson, 1952
    - Thione Sharp, 1899
    - Shoguna Lewis, 1884
    - Arunus Sen Gupta & Pal, 1995
  - Tribe Europini Sen Gupta, 1988
    - Afrobaenus Sen Gupta & Pal, 1995
    - Aneurops Sharp, 1900
    - Bactridium J.LeConte, 1861
    - Barunius Sen Gupta & Pal, 1995
    - Crowsonius Pakaluk & Slipinski, 1993
    - Eporus Grouvelle, 1897
    - Europs Wollaston, 1854
    - Hesperobaenus J.LeConte, 1861
    - Hiekesia Sen Gupta & Pal, 1995
    - Indoleptipsius Pal, 2000
    - Kakamodes Sen Gupta & Pal, 1995
    - Leptipsius Casey, 1916
    - Macreurops Casey, 1916
    - Malabica Sen Gupta, 1988
    - Malinica Sen Gupta, 1988
    - Mimema Wollaston, 1861
    - Mimemodes Reitter, 1876
    - Monotomopsis Grouvelle, 1896
    - Monotopion Reitter, 1884
    - Noveurops Sen Gupta & Pal, 1995
    - Pararhizophagus Méquignon, 1913
    - Phyconomus LeConte, 1861
    - Pycnotomina Casey, 1916
    - Renuka Sen Gupta, 1988
    - Rhizophagoides Nakane & Hisamatsu, 1963
    - Rumnicus Sen Gupta & Pal, 1995
    - Tarunius Sen Gupta, 1977

== Fossil genera ==
- †Jurorhizophagus Cai et al. 2015 Daohugou, China, Middle Jurassic (Callovian)
- †Cretakarenni Peris and Delclòs 2015 Spanish amber, Escucha Formation, Early Cretaceous (Albian), Burmese amber, Myanmar, Late Cretaceous (Cenomanian)
- †Cretolenax Liu et al. 2019 Burmese amber, Myanmar, Cenomanian
- †Rhizobactron Kirejtshuk 2013 Lebanese amber, Early Cretaceous (Barremian)
- †Rhizophtoma Kirejtshuk and Azar 2009 Lebanese amber, Barremian, Alava amber, Escucha Formation, Spain, Albian
