= Frederick Parkhurst Dodd =

Australian entomologist (1861–1937)

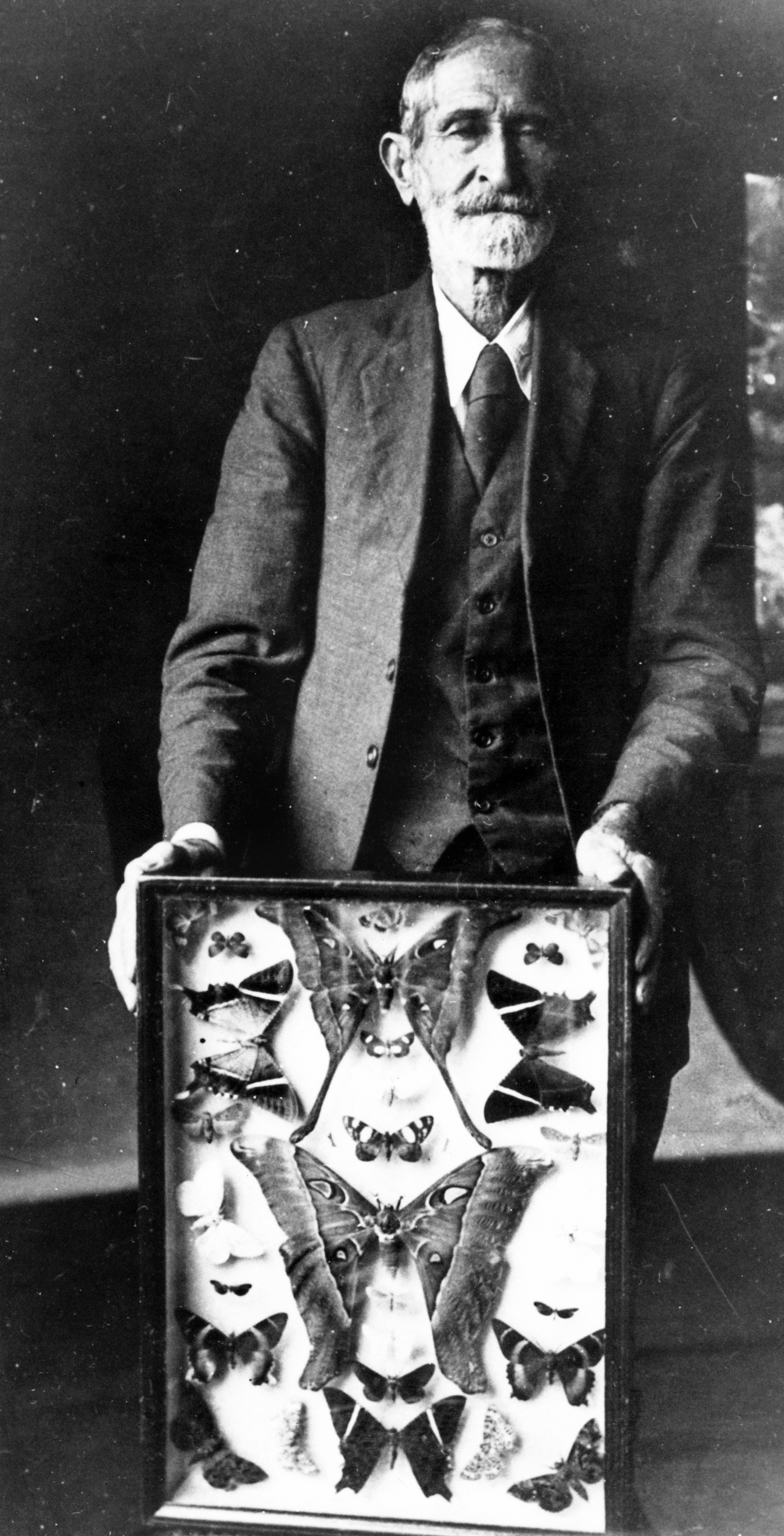
- Frederick Parkhurst Dodd, with a case containing his largest specimen of the moth, Coscinocera hercules, The Hercules Moth, 1930s
- Born: 11 March 1861; Wickliffe, Victoria
- Died: 27 July 1937 (aged 76); Kuranda, Australia
- Resting place: Kuranda Cemetery
- Known for: Entomological collection
- Children: Alan Dodd Elizabeth Dodd Katherine Dodd
- Parents: Frederick Dodd Sr. (father); Maria Mayes (mother)

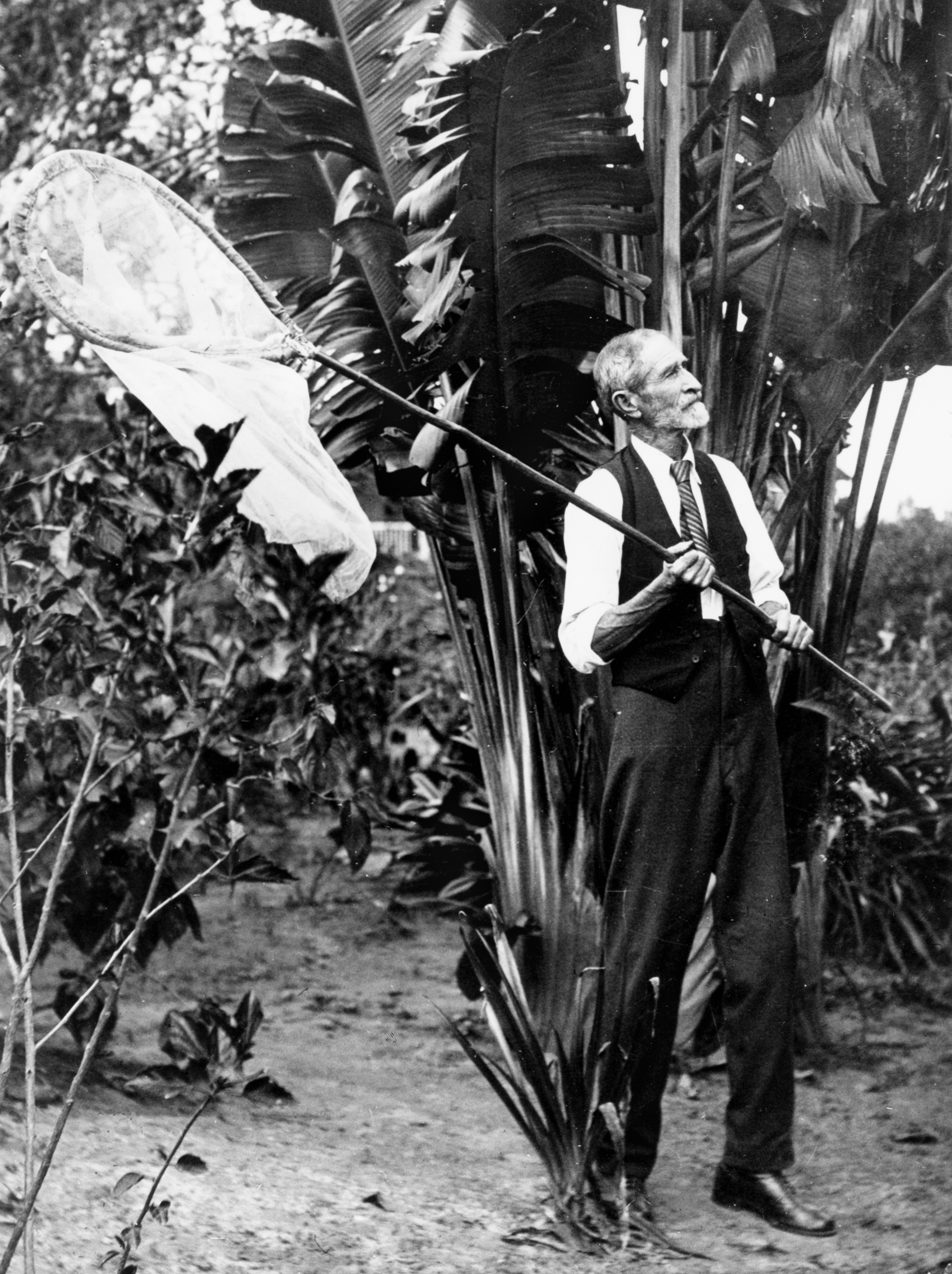
Frederick Parkhurst Dodd in his garden with a butterfly net, 1930s

Frederick Parkhurst Dodd (11 March 1861 – 27 July 1937) was an Australian entomologist. He was known as the Butterfly Man of Kuranda.

Born in Victoria, Dodd worked in a bank in Townsville, Queensland for ten years before taking up entomology full-time. A number of species are named after him and his collection of insects was of importance. He undertook collecting expeditions in New Guinea as well as Australia.

The stonefly genus Doddsia (family Taeniopterygidae) is named in his honour. In 1909, Tillyard named the dragonfly species Austrogomphus doddi after him.

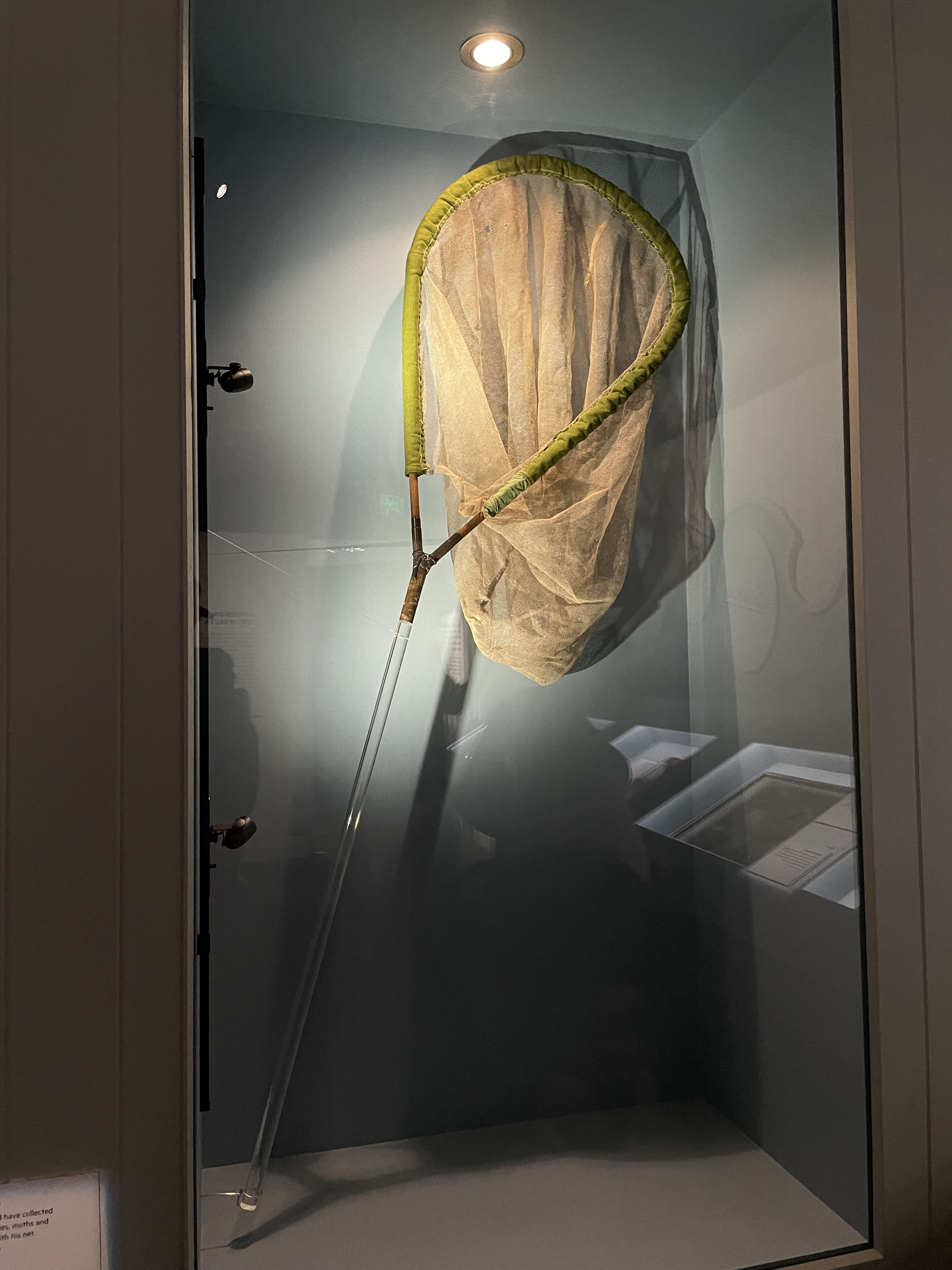
Frederick Dodd’s collecting net on display at the Queensland Museum in South Brisbane

Dodd's son Alan, and daughters Elizabeth and Katharine, continued the entomological tradition.
