= Taeniopteryx parvula =

Scientific classification
- Domain: Eukaryota
- Kingdom: Animalia
- Phylum: Arthropoda
- Class: Insecta
- Order: Plecoptera
- Family: Taeniopterygidae
- Genus: Taeniopteryx
- Species: T. parvula

Binomial name
- Taeniopteryx parvula Banks, 1918

Synonyms
- Taeniopteryx pecos Baumann and Jacobi, 1984

Species of stonefly

Taeniopteryx parvula, the hooked willowfly, is a species of winter stonefly in the family Taeniopterygidae. It is found in North America.
