= T. nivalis =

T. nivalis may refer to:

- Taeniopteryx nivalis, a stone fly species
- Titanoeca nivalis, a spider species
