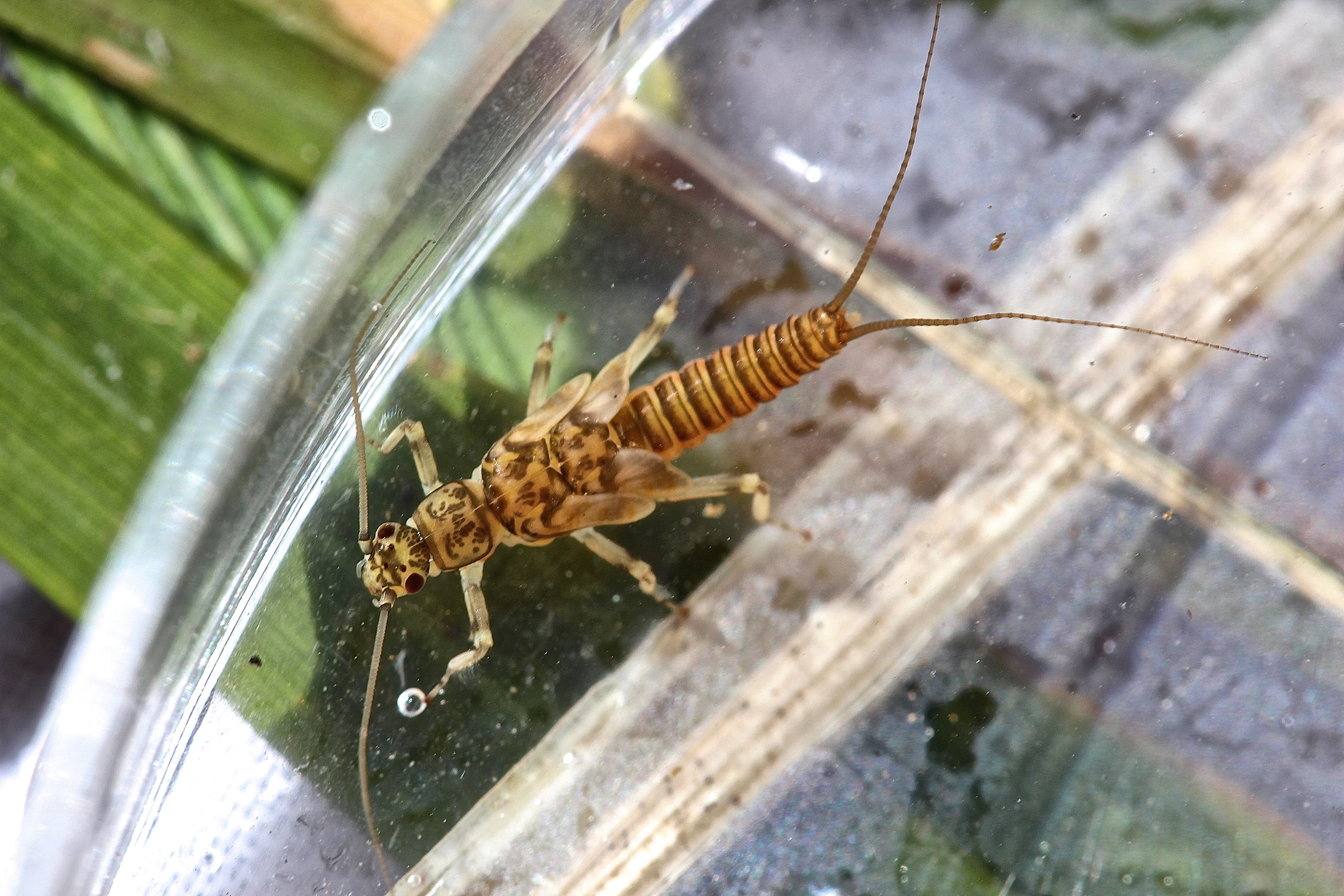

Scientific classification
- Kingdom: Animalia
- Phylum: Arthropoda
- Class: Insecta
- Order: Plecoptera
- Family: Taeniopterygidae
- Genus: Strophopteryx
- Species: S. fasciata

Binomial name
- Strophopteryx fasciata (Burmeister, 1839)

= Strophopteryx fasciata =

Species of stonefly

Strophopteryx fasciata, the mottled willowfly or early brown stonefly, is a species of winter stonefly in the family Taeniopterygidae. It is found in North America. Larvae are herbivorous and emerge as adults in late winter to early spring. This species is also known to tolerate waters of various qualities.
