= Brachyptera putata =

Conservation status
- Least Concern (IUCN 3.1)

Scientific classification
- Kingdom: Animalia
- Phylum: Arthropoda
- Clade: Pancrustacea
- Class: Insecta
- Order: Plecoptera
- Family: Taeniopterygidae
- Genus: Brachyptera
- Species: B. putata

Binomial name
- Brachyptera putata (Newman, 1838)

Synonyms
- Nemoura putata Newman, 1838

Species of stonefly

Brachyptera putata, the Northern February red, is a species of stonefly in the family Taeniopterygidae. It is endemic to Great Britain.

== Description ==
The adult stoneflies have long antennae and weak mouthparts. Females have three dark bands across their wings and dark wingtips, giving them a striped appearance. Males are brachypterous, making them worse fliers than females due to their short wings. Adults can be found basking on fence posts along river banks. Several individuals have been seen scraping fence posts with their mouthparts.

The larvae feed on filamentous algae.

== Distribution ==
The species has historically been only been found in two sites outside of Scotland, the River Usk and the River Wye, but recent searches have been unsuccessful. It is now considered to be endemic to Scotland, where it is widespread. The distribution may have changed in recent years, due to Storm Frank causing significant flooding in the River Dee.

== Habitat ==
The stonefly is found in well oxygenated rivers in open heathland or upland pastures. The aquatic larvae overwinter under riffles, clinging to the undersides of large stones. Habitats are typically well kept because they are often spawning grounds for salmon. However habitats can be vulnerable, particularly in low-lying areas, to destruction from livestock - which has been noted in some of their former sites, namely along the River Don.

== Threat level ==
The species is now thought to be extinct outside of Scotland. Since 2001 the Countryside Council for Wales had not recorded any comeback of the species in Wales or England. In surveys conducted by Action for Invertebrates in 2001, species were found in many sites in Scotland, including in rivers they had not previously been recorded in before. The IUCN assessed their conservation status in 2021 and found it to be of Least Concern.
