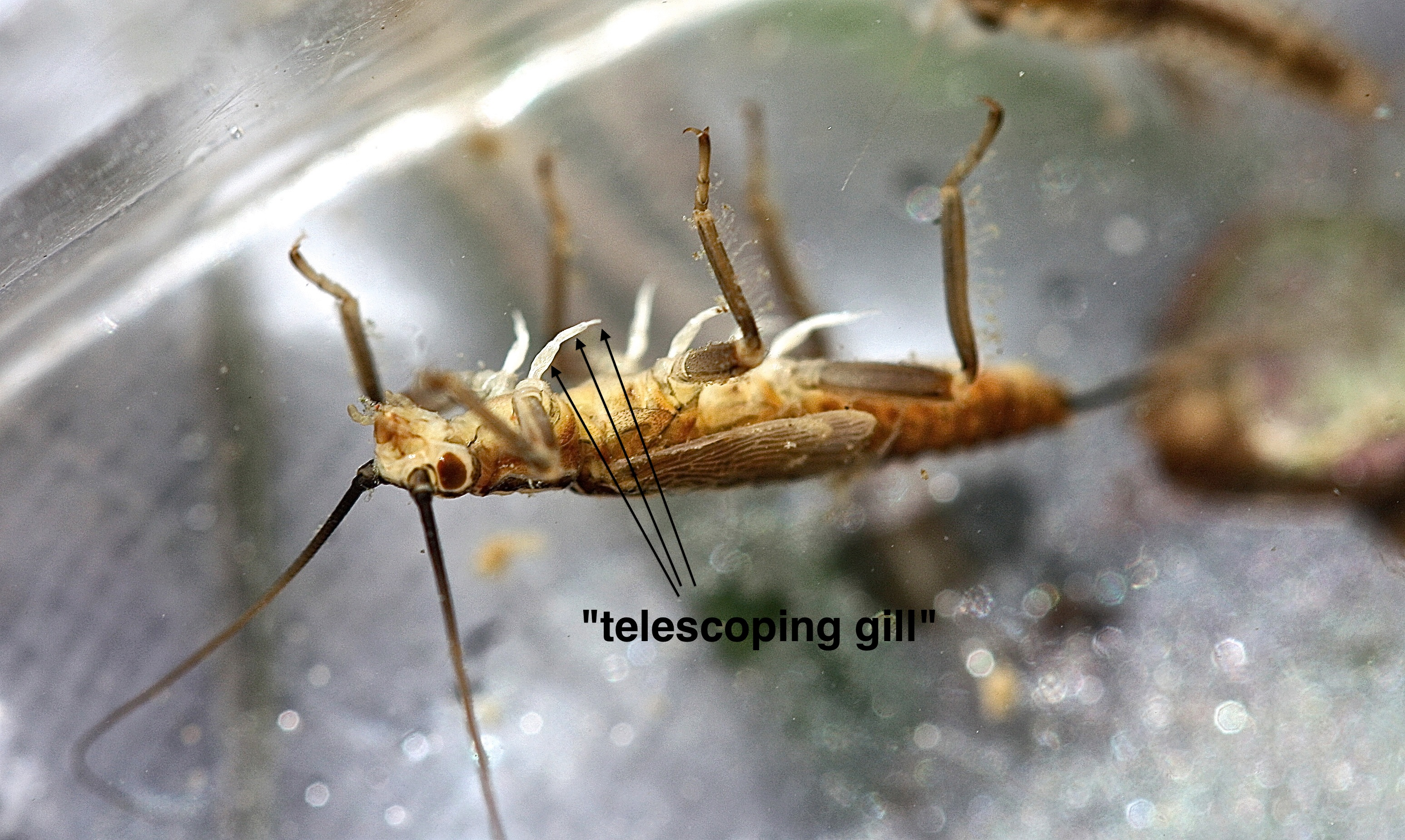

Scientific classification
- Kingdom: Animalia
- Phylum: Arthropoda
- Class: Insecta
- Order: Plecoptera
- Family: Taeniopterygidae
- Genus: Taeniopteryx
- Species: T. burksi

Binomial name
- Taeniopteryx burksi Ricker & Ross, 1968

= Taeniopteryx burksi =

Species of stonefly

Taeniopteryx burksi, the eastern willowfly, is a species of winter stonefly in the family Taeniopterygidae. It is found in North America.
