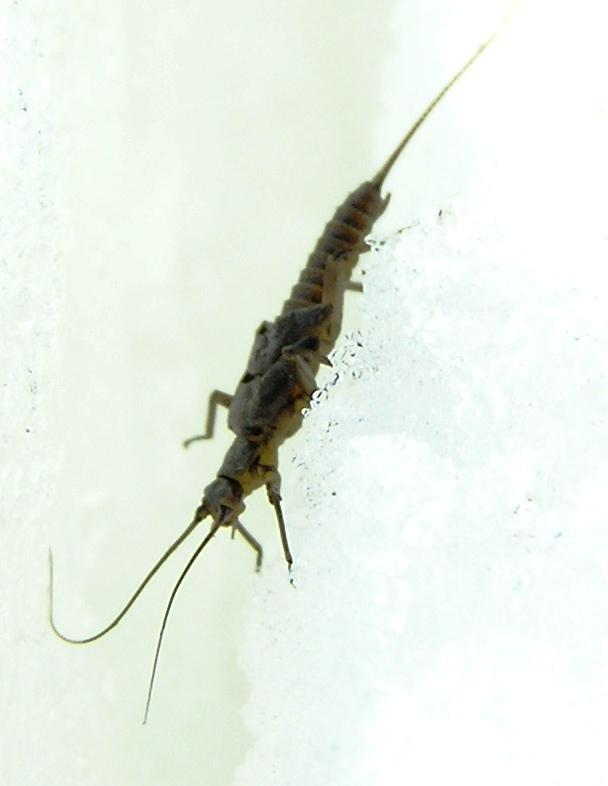

Scientific classification
- Domain: Eukaryota
- Kingdom: Animalia
- Phylum: Arthropoda
- Class: Insecta
- Order: Plecoptera
- Family: Taeniopterygidae
- Genus: Oemopteryx
- Species: O. glacialis

Binomial name
- Oemopteryx glacialis (Newport, 1849)

= Oemopteryx glacialis =

Species of stonefly

Oemopteryx glacialis, the Canadian willowfly, is a species of winter stonefly in the family Taeniopterygidae. It is found in North America.

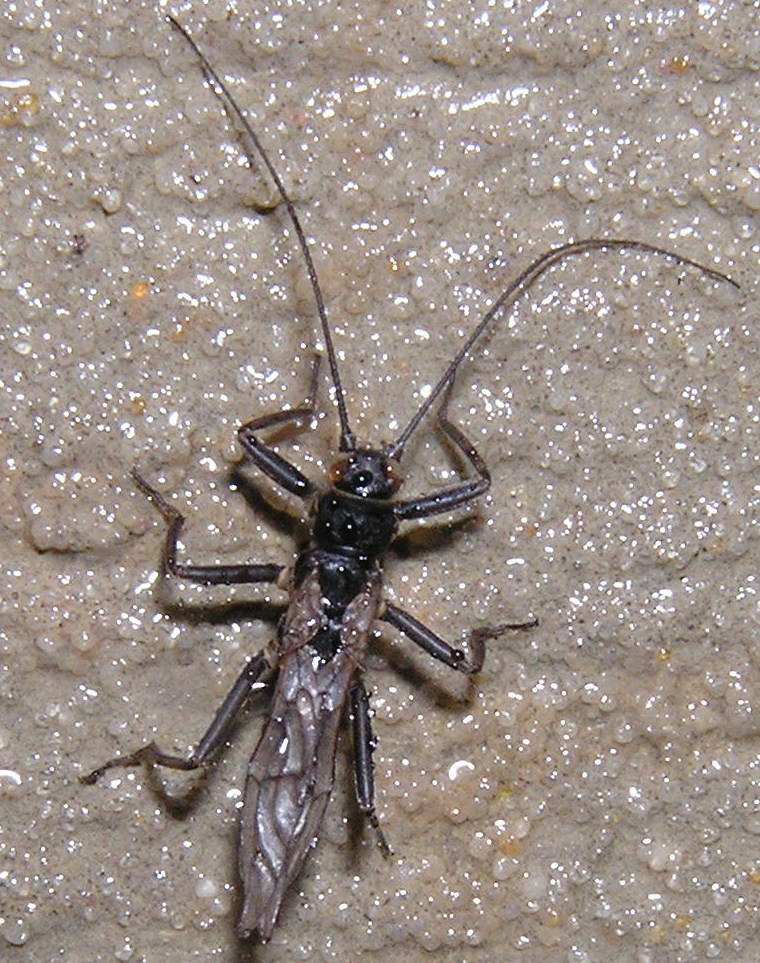
Canadian willowfly, Oemopteryx glacialis
