= Brachyptera berkii =

Scientific classification
- Domain: Eukaryota
- Kingdom: Animalia
- Phylum: Arthropoda
- Class: Insecta
- Order: Plecoptera
- Family: Taeniopterygidae
- Genus: Brachyptera
- Species: B. berkii

Binomial name
- Brachyptera berkii Kazanci, 2000

Species of stonefly

Brachyptera berkii is a taeniopterygid stonefly found in western Turkey and Crete. The adult specimens of this species are no more than 12 mm in length and brown in colouration, sometimes with V-shaped patterns in between the antennae. Its species name honours Ongun Berk, the son of Nilgün Kazancı from Hacettepe University, who in 2000 collected and first described specimens of the species in northwestern Turkey near Bursa.
