= Taenionema californicum =

Scientific classification
- Domain: Eukaryota
- Kingdom: Animalia
- Phylum: Arthropoda
- Class: Insecta
- Order: Plecoptera
- Family: Taeniopterygidae
- Genus: Taenionema
- Species: T. californicum

Binomial name
- Taenionema californicum (Needham & Claassen, 1925)

Species of stonefly

Taenionema californicum, the California willowfly, is a species of winter stonefly in the family Taeniopterygidae. It is found in North America.
