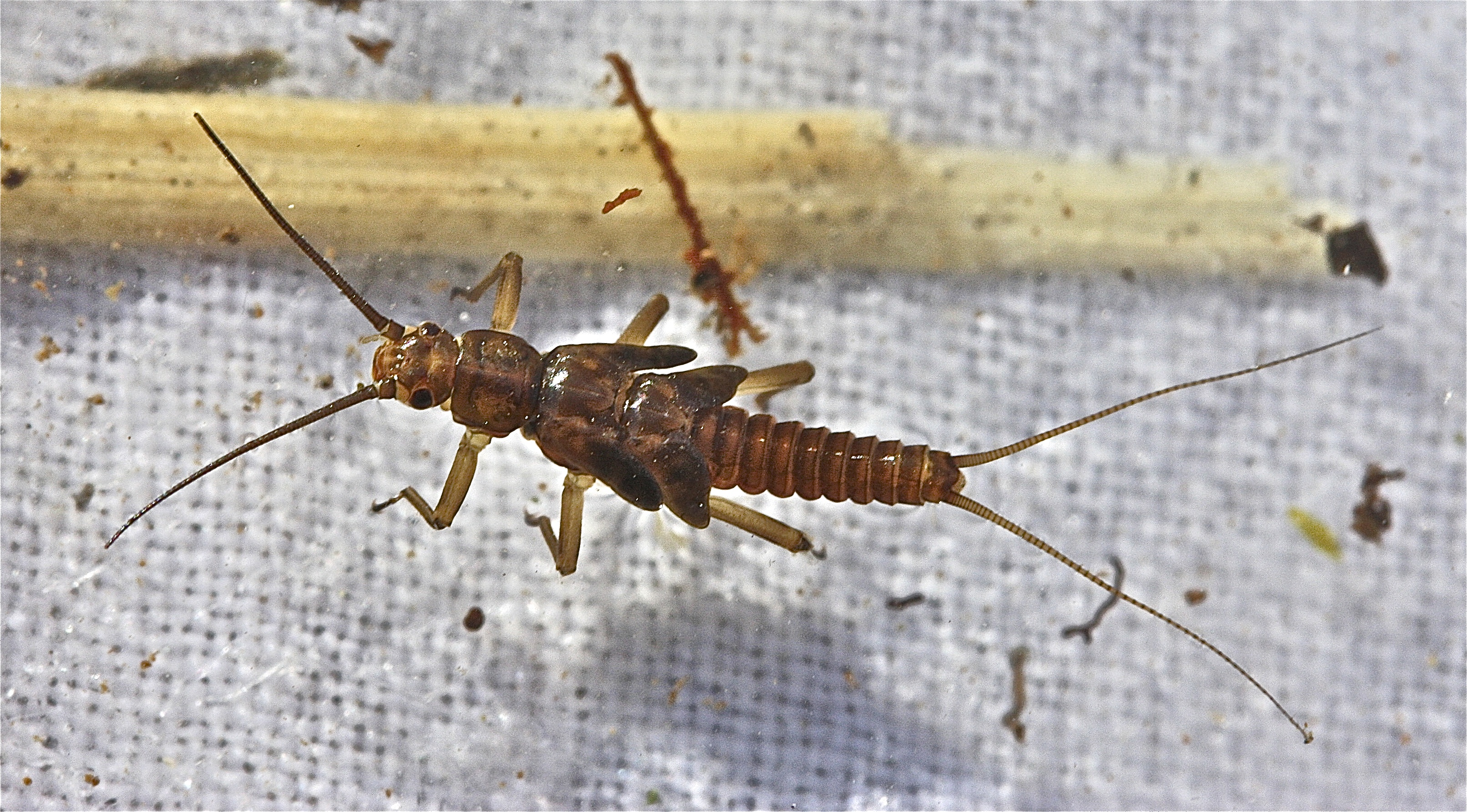

Scientific classification
- Domain: Eukaryota
- Kingdom: Animalia
- Phylum: Arthropoda
- Class: Insecta
- Order: Plecoptera
- Family: Taeniopterygidae
- Genus: Taenionema
- Species: T. atlanticum

Binomial name
- Taenionema atlanticum Ricker & Ross, 1975

= Taenionema atlanticum =

Species of stonefly

Taenionema atlanticum, the Atlantic willowfly, is a species of winter stonefly in the family Taeniopterygidae. It is found in North America.
