= Taenionema oregonense =

Scientific classification
- Domain: Eukaryota
- Kingdom: Animalia
- Phylum: Arthropoda
- Class: Insecta
- Order: Plecoptera
- Family: Taeniopterygidae
- Genus: Taenionema
- Species: T. oregonense

Binomial name
- Taenionema oregonense (Needham & Claassen, 1925)

Species of stonefly

Taenionema oregonense, the oregon willowfly, is a species of winter stonefly in the family Taeniopterygidae. It is found in North America.
