= Oemopteryx contorta =

Scientific classification
- Domain: Eukaryota
- Kingdom: Animalia
- Phylum: Arthropoda
- Class: Insecta
- Order: Plecoptera
- Family: Taeniopterygidae
- Genus: Oemopteryx
- Species: O. contorta

Binomial name
- Oemopteryx contorta (Needham & Claassen, 1925)

Species of stonefly

Oemopteryx contorta, the dark willowfly, is a species of winter stonefly in the family Taeniopterygidae. It is found in North America.
