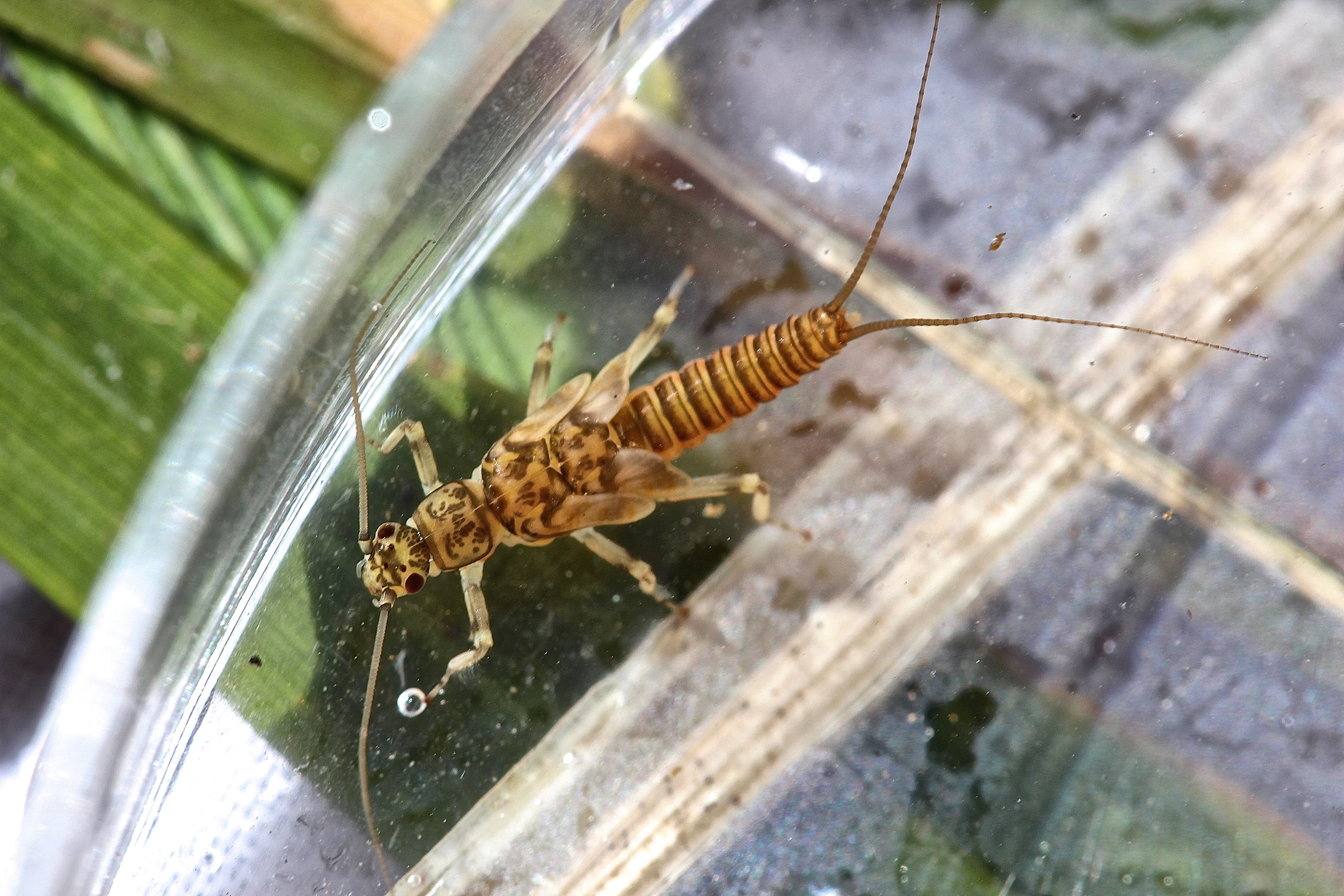
- Strophopteryx fasciata

Scientific classification
- Kingdom: Animalia
- Phylum: Arthropoda
- Class: Insecta
- Order: Plecoptera
- Family: Taeniopterygidae
- Genus: Strophopteryx; Frison, 1929

= Strophopteryx =

Genus of stoneflies

Strophopteryx is a genus of winter stoneflies in the family Taeniopterygidae. There are about seven described species in Strophopteryx.

== Species ==
These seven species belong to the genus Strophopteryx:

- Strophopteryx appalachia Ricker & Ross, 1975
- Strophopteryx arkansae Ricker & Ross, 1975
- Strophopteryx cucullata Frison, 1934
- Strophopteryx fasciata (Burmeister, 1839) (mottled willowfly)
- Strophopteryx limata (Frison, 1942)
- Strophopteryx nohirae (Okamoto, 1922)
- Strophopteryx rickeri Zhiltzova, 1976
