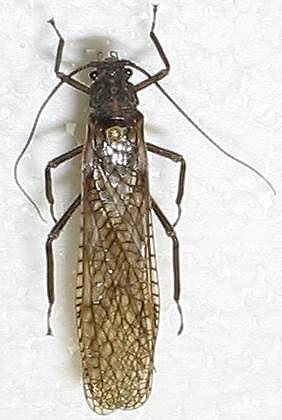
- Northern February red (B. putata)

Scientific classification
- Domain: Eukaryota
- Kingdom: Animalia
- Phylum: Arthropoda
- Class: Insecta
- Order: Plecoptera
- Family: Taeniopterygidae
- Subfamily: Brachypterainae
- Genus: Brachyptera; Newport, 1848

= Brachyptera =

Genus of stoneflies

Brachyptera is a genus of taeniopterygid stoneflies of mostly Western Palearctic distribution.

== Species ==
These 30 species belong to the genus Brachyptera:

- Brachyptera algirica Aubert, 1956
- Brachyptera ankara Kazanci, 2000
- Brachyptera arcuata (Klapálek, 1902)
- Brachyptera auberti Consiglio, 1957
- Brachyptera beali (Navás, 1923)
- Brachyptera berkii Kazanci, 2001
- Brachyptera braueri Klapálek, 1900
- Brachyptera brevipennis Zhiltzova, 1964
- Brachyptera bulgarica Raušer, 1962
- Brachyptera calabrica Aubert, 1953
- Brachyptera demirsoyi Kazanci, 1983
- Brachyptera dinarica Aubert, 1964
- Brachyptera galeata Koponen, 1949
- Brachyptera graeca Berthélemy, 1971
- Brachyptera helenica Aubert, 1956
- Brachyptera kontschani Murányi, 2011
- Brachyptera macedonica Ikonomov, 1983
- Brachyptera monilicornis (Pictet, 1841)
- Brachyptera phthiotica Berthélemy, 1971
- Brachyptera putata (Newman, 1838)
- Brachyptera risi (Morton, 1896)
- Brachyptera seticornis (Klapálek, 1902)
- Brachyptera sislii Kazanci, 1983
- Brachyptera starmachi Sowa, 1966
- Brachyptera thracica Raušer, 1965
- Brachyptera transcaucasica Zhiltzova, 1956
- Brachyptera trifasciata (Pictet, 1832)
- Brachyptera tristis (Klapálek, 1901)
- Brachyptera vera Berthélemy & Gonzalez del Tanago, 1983
- Brachyptera zwicki Braasch & Joost, 1971
