= Obipteryx =

Scientific classification
- Domain: Eukaryota
- Kingdom: Animalia
- Phylum: Arthropoda
- Class: Insecta
- Order: Plecoptera
- Family: Taeniopterygidae
- Subfamily: Brachypterainae
- Genus: Obipteryx; Okamoto, 1922

Genus of stoneflies

Obipteryx is a genus of winter stoneflies in the family Taeniopterygidae. There are at least two described species in Obipteryx.

== Species ==
These two species belong to the genus Obipteryx:

- Obipteryx femoralis Okamoto, 1922
- Obipteryx tenuis (Needham, 1905)
