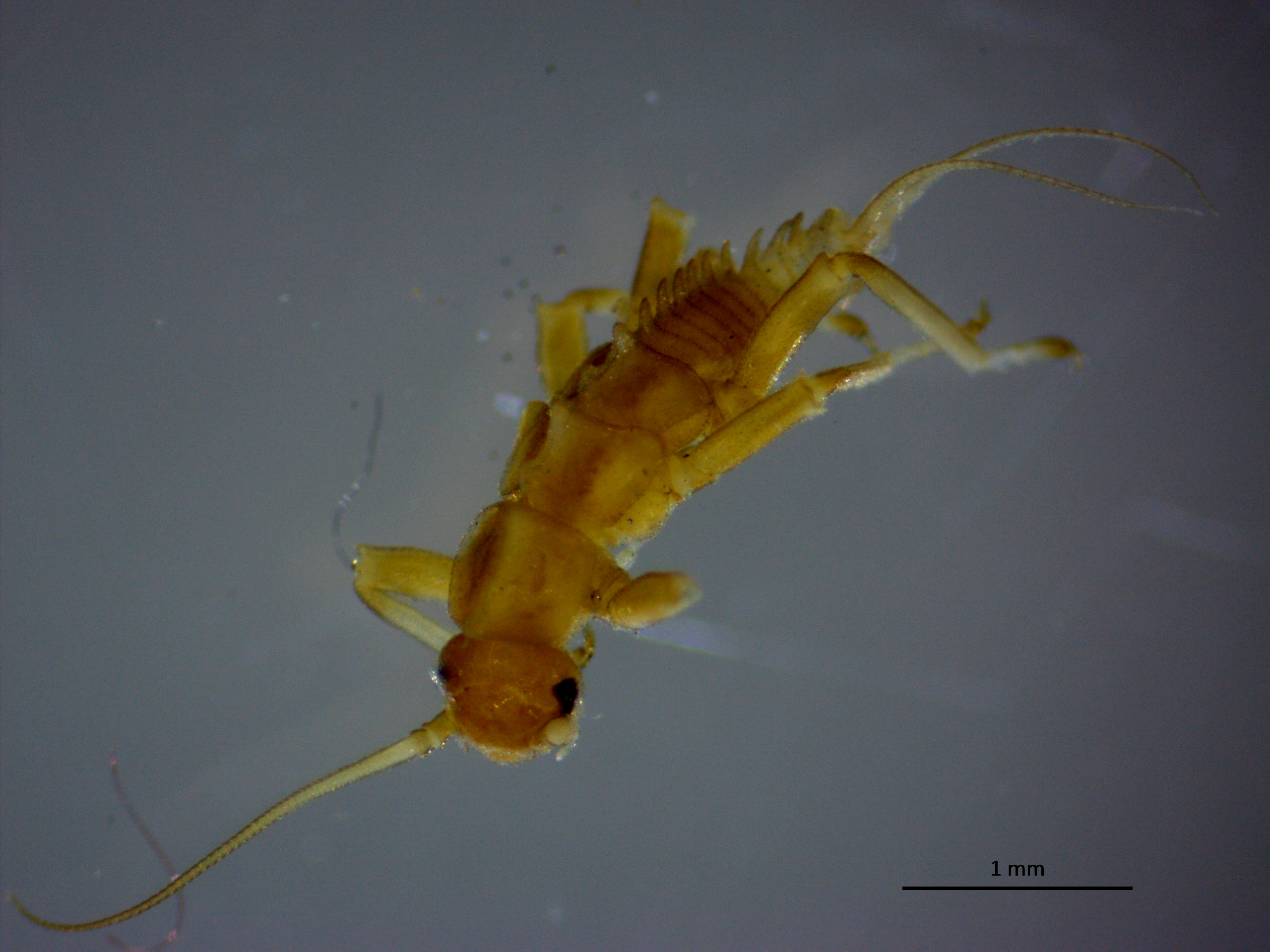
- Taeniopteryx hubaulti

Scientific classification
- Domain: Eukaryota
- Kingdom: Animalia
- Phylum: Arthropoda
- Class: Insecta
- Order: Plecoptera
- Family: Taeniopterygidae
- Genus: Taeniopteryx; Pictet, 1841

Synonyms
- Nephelopteryx Needham and Claassen, 1925

= Taeniopteryx =

Genus of stoneflies

Taeniopteryx is a genus of winter stoneflies in the family Taeniopterygidae. There are more than 20 described species in Taeniopteryx.

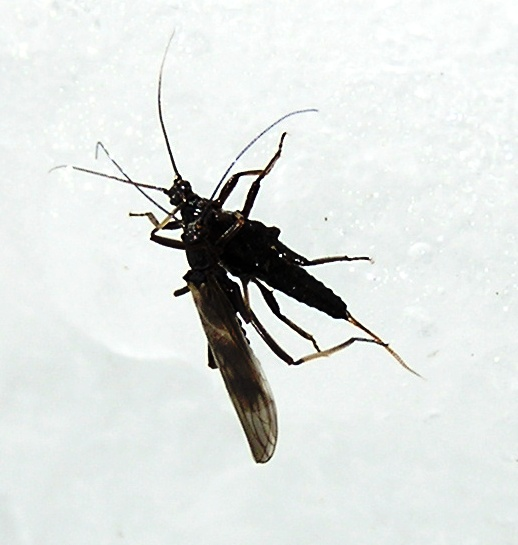
Taeniopteryx nivalis

== Species ==
These 23 species belong to the genus Taeniopteryx:

- Taeniopteryx araneoides Klapálek, 1902
- Taeniopteryx auberti Kis & Sowa, 1964
- Taeniopteryx burksi Ricker & Ross, 1968 (eastern willowfly)
- Taeniopteryx caucasica Zhiltzova, 1981
- Taeniopteryx fusca Ikonomov, 1980
- Taeniopteryx hubaulti Aubert, 1946
- Taeniopteryx kuehtreiberi Aubert, 1950
- Taeniopteryx lita Frison, 1942
- Taeniopteryx lonicera Ricker & Ross, 1968
- Taeniopteryx maura (Pictet, 1841)
- Taeniopteryx mercuryi Fochetti & Nicolai, 1996
- Taeniopteryx metequi Ricker & Ross, 1968
- Taeniopteryx nebulosa (Linnaeus, 1758)
- Taeniopteryx nelsoni Kondratieff & Kirchner, 1982
- Taeniopteryx nivalis (Fitch, 1847) (boreal willowfly)
- Taeniopteryx parvula Banks, 1918 (hooked willowfly)
- Taeniopteryx robinae Kondratieff & Kirchner, 1984
- Taeniopteryx schoenemundi (Mertens, 1923)
- Taeniopteryx stankovitchi Ikonomov, 1978
- Taeniopteryx starki Stewart & Szczytko, 1974
- Taeniopteryx ugola Ricker & Ross, 1968
- † Taeniopteryx ciliata (Pictet, 1856)
- † Taeniopteryx elongata (Hagen, 1856)
