= Bolotoperla =

Scientific classification
- Domain: Eukaryota
- Kingdom: Animalia
- Phylum: Arthropoda
- Class: Insecta
- Order: Plecoptera
- Family: Taeniopterygidae
- Genus: Bolotoperla; Ricker & Ross, 1975
- Species: B. rossi

Binomial name
- Bolotoperla rossi (Frison, 1942)

Genus of stoneflies

Bolotoperla is a genus of winter stoneflies in the family Taeniopterygidae. There is one described species in Bolotoperla, B. rossi.
