= Kyphopteryx =

Scientific classification
- Domain: Eukaryota
- Kingdom: Animalia
- Phylum: Arthropoda
- Class: Insecta
- Order: Plecoptera
- Family: Taeniopterygidae
- Subfamily: Brachypterainae
- Genus: Kyphopteryx; Kimmins, 1947

Genus of stoneflies

Kyphopteryx is a genus of winter stoneflies in the family Taeniopterygidae. There are about five described species in Kyphopteryx.

== Species ==
These five species belong to the genus Kyphopteryx:

- Kyphopteryx brodskii (Zhiltzova, 1972)
- Kyphopteryx coniformis Chen & Du, 2019
- Kyphopteryx dorsalis Kimmins, 1947
- Kyphopteryx pamirica Zhiltzova, 1972
- Kyphopteryx yangi Du & Chen, 2019
