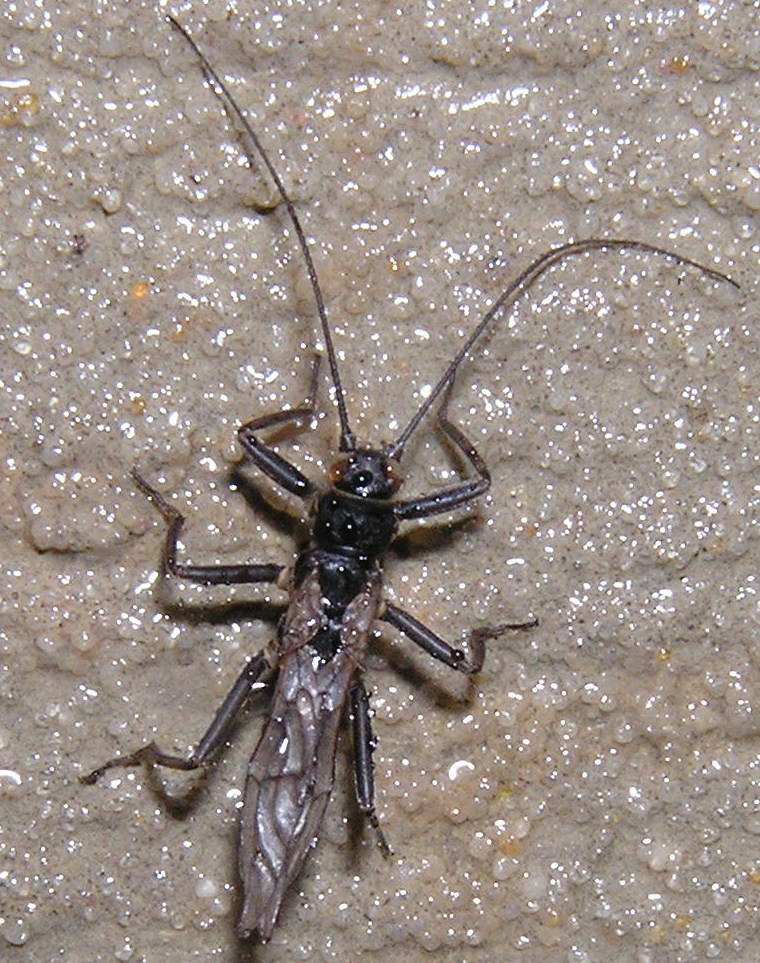
- Oemopteryx glacialis

Scientific classification
- Domain: Eukaryota
- Kingdom: Animalia
- Phylum: Arthropoda
- Class: Insecta
- Order: Plecoptera
- Family: Taeniopterygidae
- Genus: Oemopteryx; Klapálek, 1902

= Oemopteryx =

Genus of stoneflies

Oemopteryx is a genus of winter stoneflies in the family Taeniopterygidae. There are about six described species in Oemopteryx.

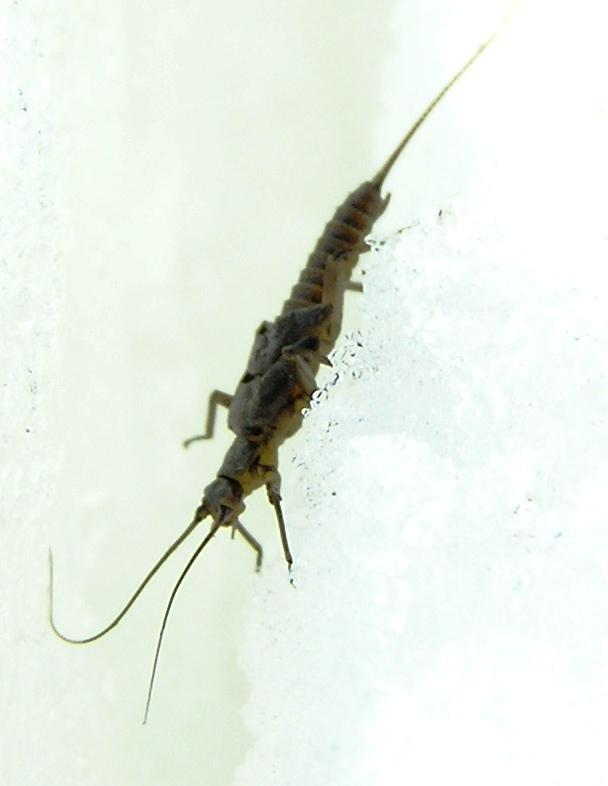
Oemopteryx glacialis

== Species ==
These six species belong to the genus Oemopteryx:

- Oemopteryx contorta (Needham & Claassen, 1925) (dark willowfly)
- Oemopteryx fosketti (Ricker, 1965)
- Oemopteryx glacialis (Newport, 1849) (Canadian willowfly)
- Oemopteryx leei Baumann & Kondratieff, 2009
- Oemopteryx loewii (Albarda, 1889)
- Oemopteryx vanduzeea (Claassen, 1937)
