= Austrogomphus doddi =

Northern river hunter

Conservation status
- Vulnerable (IUCN 3.1)

Scientific classification
- Kingdom: Animalia
- Phylum: Arthropoda
- Clade: Pancrustacea
- Class: Insecta
- Order: Odonata
- Suborder: Anisoptera
- Family: Gomphidae
- Genus: Austrogomphus
- Subgenus: Austrogomphus
- Species: A. doddi

Binomial name
- Austrogomphus doddi Tillyard, 1909

Species of dragonfly

Austrogomphus doddi, also known as Austrogomphus (Austrogomphus) doddi, is a species of dragonfly of the family Gomphidae, commonly known as the northern river hunter. It inhabits streams and rivers in north-eastern Queensland, Australia.

Austrogomphus doddi is a tiny to medium-sized, black and yellow dragonfly.

== Etymology ==
The genus name Austrogomphus combines the prefix austro- (from Latin auster, meaning “south wind”, hence “southern”) with Gomphus, a genus name derived from Greek γόμφος (gomphos, “peg” or “nail”), alluding to the clubbed shape of the abdomen in males.

In 1909, Robin Tillyard named this species doddi, an eponym honouring Frederick Parkhurst Dodd (1861-1937), an amateur collector of butterflies and beetles.

== Gallery ==
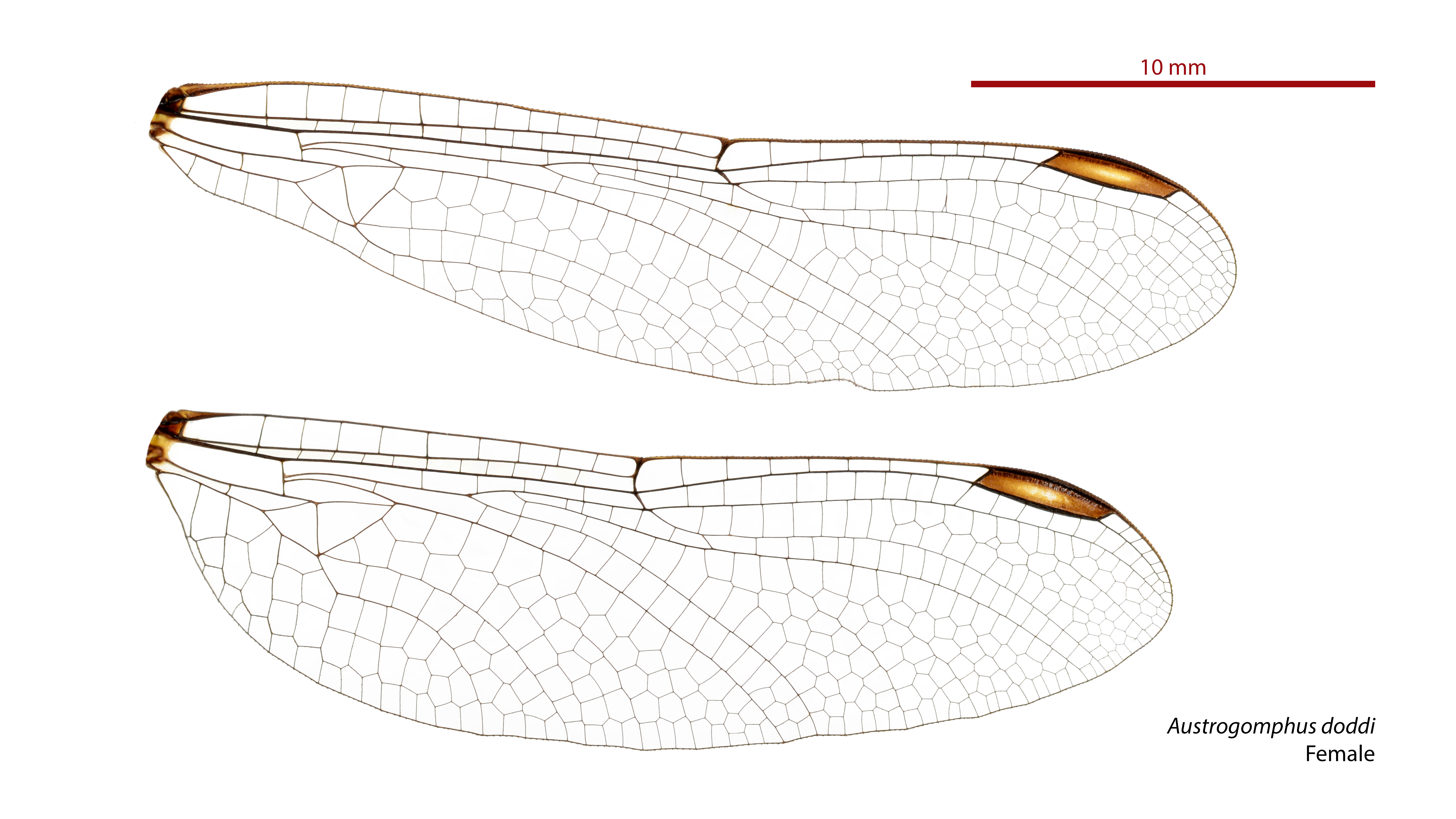
Female wings

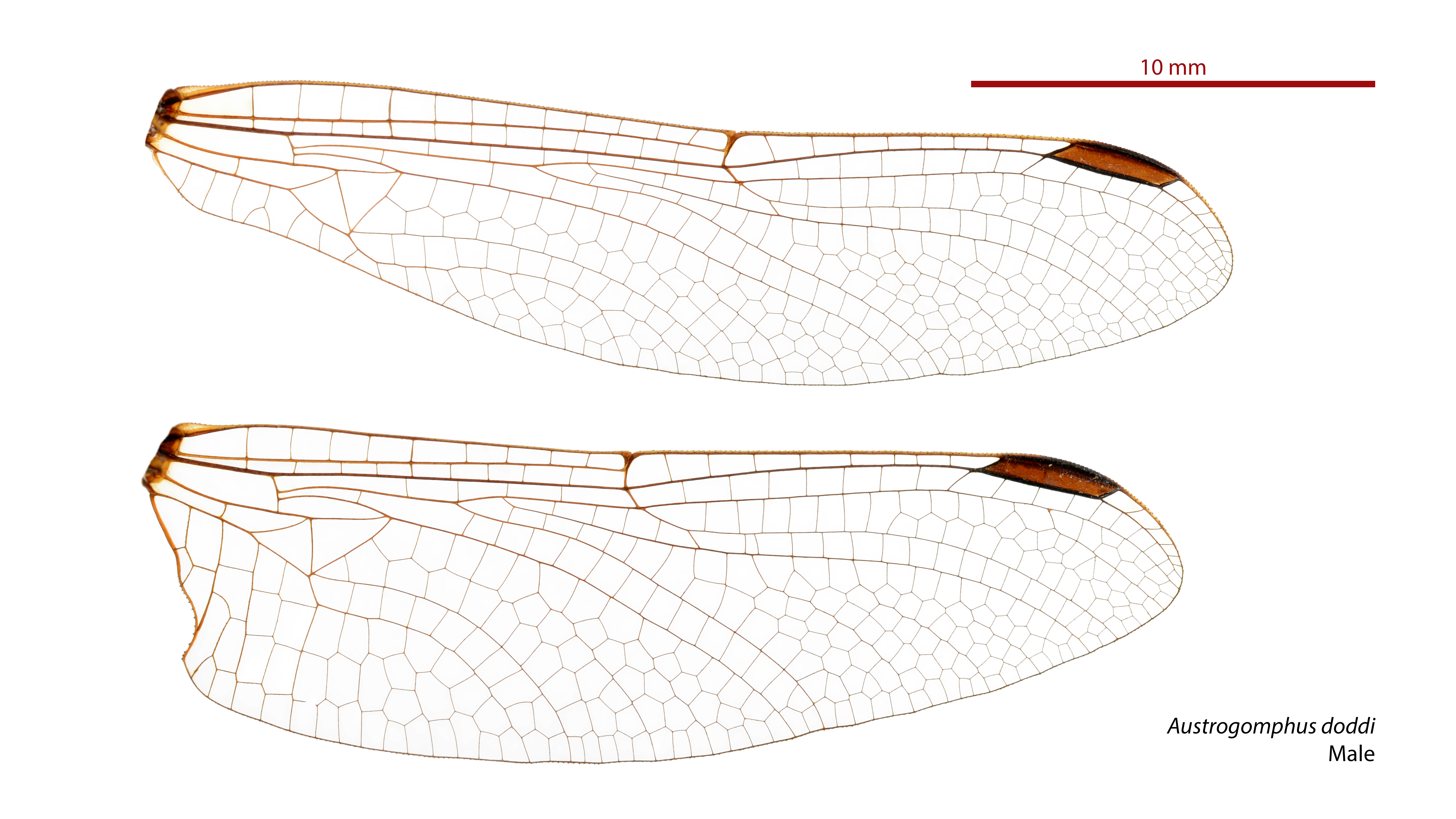
Male wings

== See also ==
- List of Odonata species of Australia
