= Rhabdiopteryx =

Scientific classification
- Domain: Eukaryota
- Kingdom: Animalia
- Phylum: Arthropoda
- Class: Insecta
- Order: Plecoptera
- Family: Taeniopterygidae
- Subfamily: Brachypterainae
- Genus: Rhabdiopteryx; Klapálek, 1902

Genus of stoneflies

Rhabdiopteryx is a genus of winter stoneflies in the family Taeniopterygidae. There are about 11 described species in Rhabdiopteryx.

== Species ==
These 11 species belong to the genus Rhabdiopteryx:

- Rhabdiopteryx acuminata Klapálek, 1905
- Rhabdiopteryx alpina Kühtreiber, 1934
- Rhabdiopteryx antoninoi Vinçon & Ravizza, 1999
- Rhabdiopteryx christinae Theischinger, 1975
- Rhabdiopteryx doieranensis Ikonomov, 1983
- Rhabdiopteryx hamulata (Klapálek, 1902)
- Rhabdiopteryx harperi Vinçon & Murányi, 2009
- Rhabdiopteryx navicula Theischinger, 1974
- Rhabdiopteryx neglecta (Albarda, 1889)
- Rhabdiopteryx thienemanni Illies, 1957
- Rhabdiopteryx triangularis Braasch & Joost, 1972
