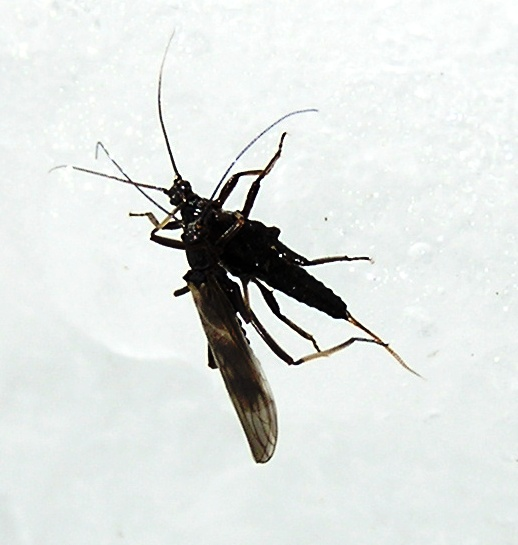

Scientific classification
- Domain: Eukaryota
- Kingdom: Animalia
- Phylum: Arthropoda
- Class: Insecta
- Order: Plecoptera
- Family: Taeniopterygidae
- Genus: Taeniopteryx
- Species: T. nivalis

Binomial name
- Taeniopteryx nivalis (Fitch, 1847)

= Taeniopteryx nivalis =

Species of stonefly

Taeniopteryx nivalis, the boreal willowfly, is a species of winter stonefly in the family Taeniopterygidae. It is found in North America.
