= Mesyatsia =

Scientific classification
- Domain: Eukaryota
- Kingdom: Animalia
- Phylum: Arthropoda
- Class: Insecta
- Order: Plecoptera
- Family: Taeniopterygidae
- Subfamily: Brachypterainae
- Genus: Mesyatsia; Ricker & Ross, 1975

Genus of stoneflies

Mesyatsia is a genus of winter stoneflies in the family Taeniopterygidae. There are about six described species in Mesyatsia.

== Species ==
These six species belong to the genus Mesyatsia:

- Mesyatsia imanishii (Uéno, 1929)
- Mesyatsia karakorum (Šámal, 1935)
- Mesyatsia makartchenkoi Teslenko & Zhiltzova, 1992
- Mesyatsia nigra Zwick, 1980
- Mesyatsia o-notata (Okamoto, 1922)
- Mesyatsia tianshanica (Zhiltzova, 1972)
