= Kohnoperla =

Scientific classification
- Domain: Eukaryota
- Kingdom: Animalia
- Phylum: Arthropoda
- Class: Insecta
- Order: Plecoptera
- Family: Taeniopterygidae
- Genus: Kohnoperla; Ricker & Ross, 1975
- Species: K. yugawae

Binomial name
- Kohnoperla yugawae (Kohno, 1965)

Genus of stoneflies

Kohnoperla is a genus of winter stoneflies in the family Taeniopterygidae. There is one described species in Kohnoperla, K. yugawae.
