= Okamotoperla =

Scientific classification
- Domain: Eukaryota
- Kingdom: Animalia
- Phylum: Arthropoda
- Class: Insecta
- Order: Plecoptera
- Family: Taeniopterygidae
- Genus: Okamotoperla; Ricker & Ross, 1975
- Species: O. zonata

Binomial name
- Okamotoperla zonata (Okamoto, 1922)

Genus of stoneflies

Okamotoperla is a genus of winter stoneflies in the family Taeniopterygidae. There is one described species in Okamotoperla, O. zonata.
