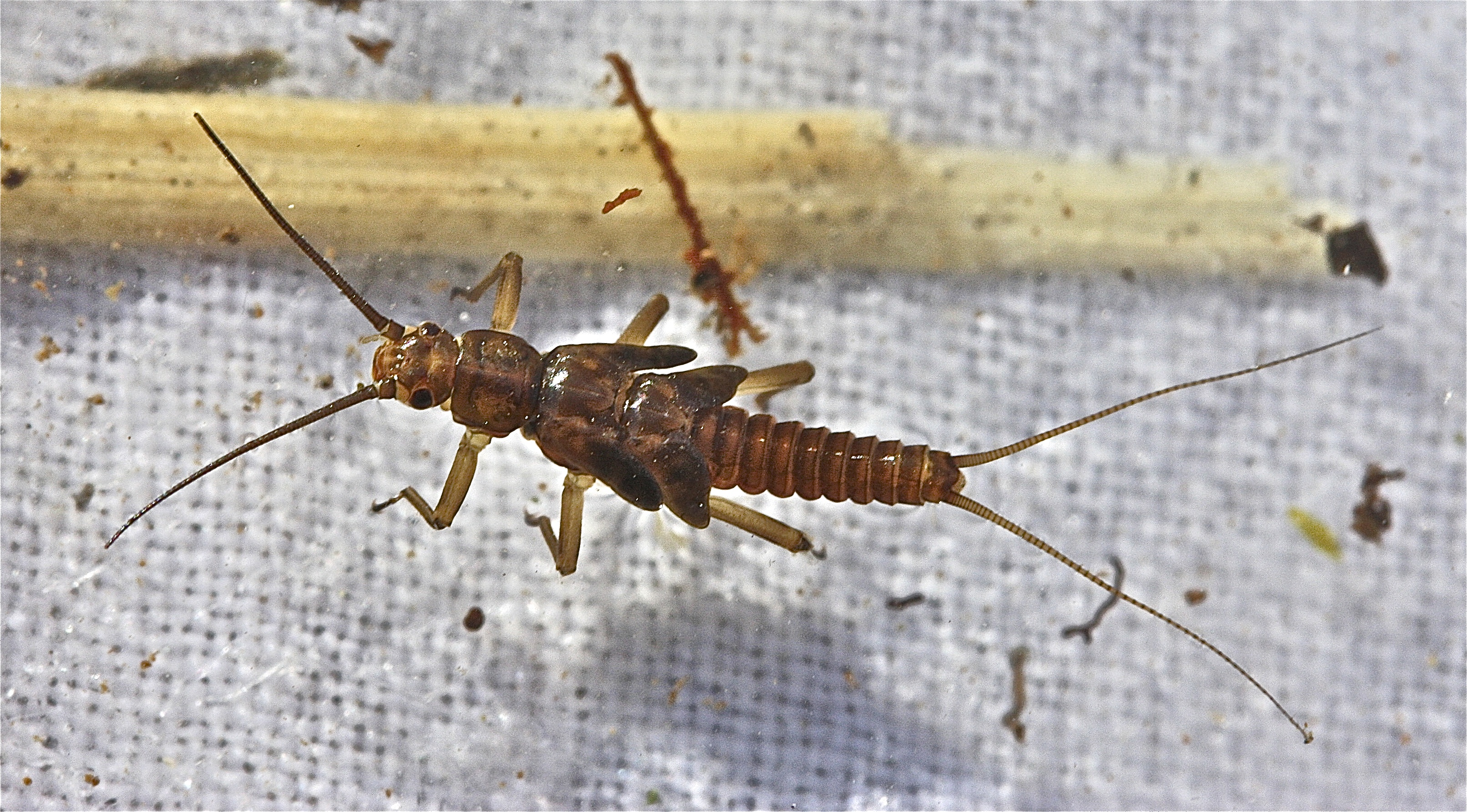
- Taenionema atlanticum

Scientific classification
- Domain: Eukaryota
- Kingdom: Animalia
- Phylum: Arthropoda
- Class: Insecta
- Order: Plecoptera
- Family: Taeniopterygidae
- Genus: Taenionema; Banks, 1905

= Taenionema =

Genus of stoneflies

Taenionema is a genus of winter stoneflies in the family Taeniopterygidae. There are about 14 described species in Taenionema.

== Species ==
These 14 species belong to the genus Taenionema:

- Taenionema atlanticum Ricker & Ross, 1975 (Atlantic willowfly)
- Taenionema californicum (Needham & Claassen, 1925) (California willowfly)
- Taenionema grinnelli (Banks, 1918)
- Taenionema jacobii Stanger & Baumann, 1993
- Taenionema japonicum (Matsumura, 1904)
- Taenionema jeanae Baumann & Nelson, 2007
- Taenionema jewetti Stanger & Baumann, 1993
- Taenionema kincaidi (Hoppe, 1938)
- Taenionema oregonense (Needham & Claassen, 1925) (oregon willowfly)
- Taenionema pacificum (Banks, 1900)
- Taenionema pallidum (Banks, 1902)
- Taenionema raynorium (Claassen, 1937)
- Taenionema uinta Stanger & Baumann, 1993
- Taenionema umatilla Stanger & Baumann, 1993
