= Doddsia =

Scientific classification
- Domain: Eukaryota
- Kingdom: Animalia
- Phylum: Arthropoda
- Class: Insecta
- Order: Plecoptera
- Family: Taeniopterygidae
- Genus: Doddsia; Needham & Claassen, 1925
- Species: D. occidentalis

Binomial name
- Doddsia occidentalis (Banks, 1900)

Genus of stoneflies

Doddsia is a genus of winter stoneflies in the family Taeniopterygidae. There is one described species in Doddsia, D. occidentalis.
