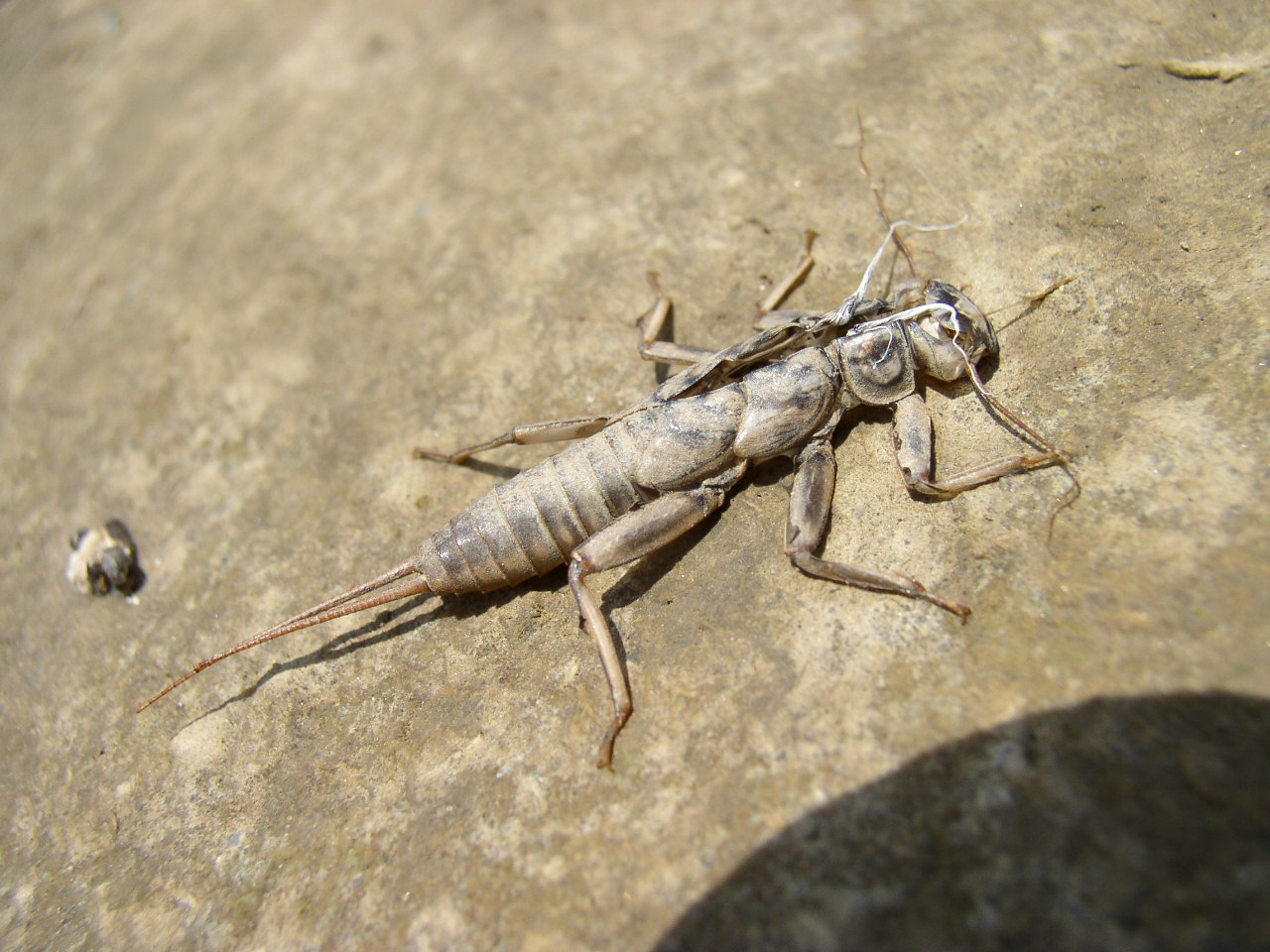
- unidentified species (exuvia) from the Carpathian Mountains, West Ukraine.

Scientific classification
- Kingdom: Animalia
- Phylum: Arthropoda
- Class: Insecta
- Cohort: Polyneoptera
- Order: Plecoptera
- Superfamily: Nemouroidea
- Family: Taeniopterygidae; Klapálek, 1905

Subfamilies
- Brachypterainae Zwick, 1973; Taeniopteryginae Klapálek, 1905

= Taeniopterygidae =

Taeniopterygidae Temporal range: Middle Jurassic–Recent

Family of stoneflies

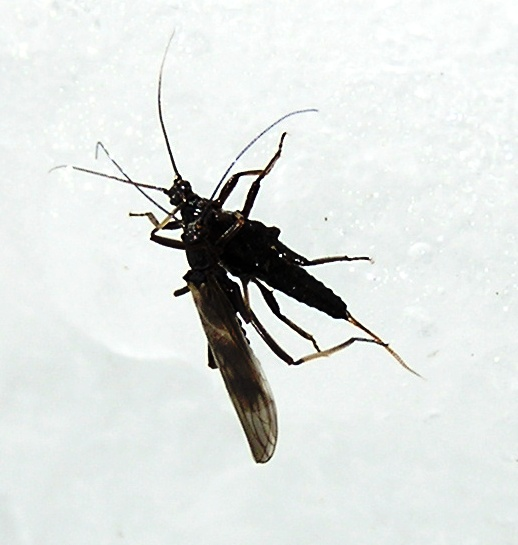
Taeniopteryx nivalis

Taeniopterygidae are a family of stone flies with about 110 described extant species. They are commonly called willowflies or winter stoneflies and have a holarctic distribution. Adults are usually smaller than 15 mm.

== Subfamilies and genera ==
The genus Taeniopteryx is in the subfamily Taeniopteryginae, and the remainder of the extant genera are in the subfamily Brachypterainae.

=== Brachypterainae ===
Authority: Zwick, 1973

1. † Balticopteryx Chen, 2018 (1 species) Baltic amber, Eocene
2. Bolotoperla Ricker & Ross, 1975
3. Brachyptera Newport, 1848
4. Doddsia Needham & Claassen, 1925
5. Kohnoperla Ricker & Ross, 1975
6. Kyphopteryx Kimmins, 1947
7. † Liaotaenionema Liu, Ren & Sinitshenkova, 2008 (1 species) Yixian Formation, China, Early Cretaceous (Aptian)
8. Mesyatsia Ricker & Ross, 1975
9. Obipteryx Okamoto, 1922
10. Oemopteryx Klapálek, 1902
11. Okamotoperla Ricker & Ross, 1975
12. Rhabdiopteryx Klapálek, 1902
13. Strophopteryx Frison, 1929
14. Taenionema Banks, 1905

Taeniopteryginae Klapálek, 1905

1. Taeniopteryx Pictet, 1841

=== Extinct genera ===
- † Gurvanopteryx Sinitshenkova, 1986 (2 species) Gurvan-Eren Formation, Mongolia, Early Cretaceous (Aptian)
- † Jurataenionema Liu & Ren, 2007 (3 species) Daohugou, China, Middle/Late Jurassic Khasurty locality, Russia, Early Cretaceous (Aptian)
- † Mengitaenioptera Liu & Ren, 2008 (1 species) Daohugou, China, Middle/Late Jurassic
- † Noviramonemoura Liu & Ren, 2008 (1 species) Daohugou, China, Middle/Late Jurassic
- † Positopteryx Sinitshenkova, 1987 (1 species) Glushkovo Formation, Russia, Late Jurassic (Tithonian)
- † Protaenionema Liu & Shih, 2007 (1 species) Daohugou, China, Middle/Late Jurassic
