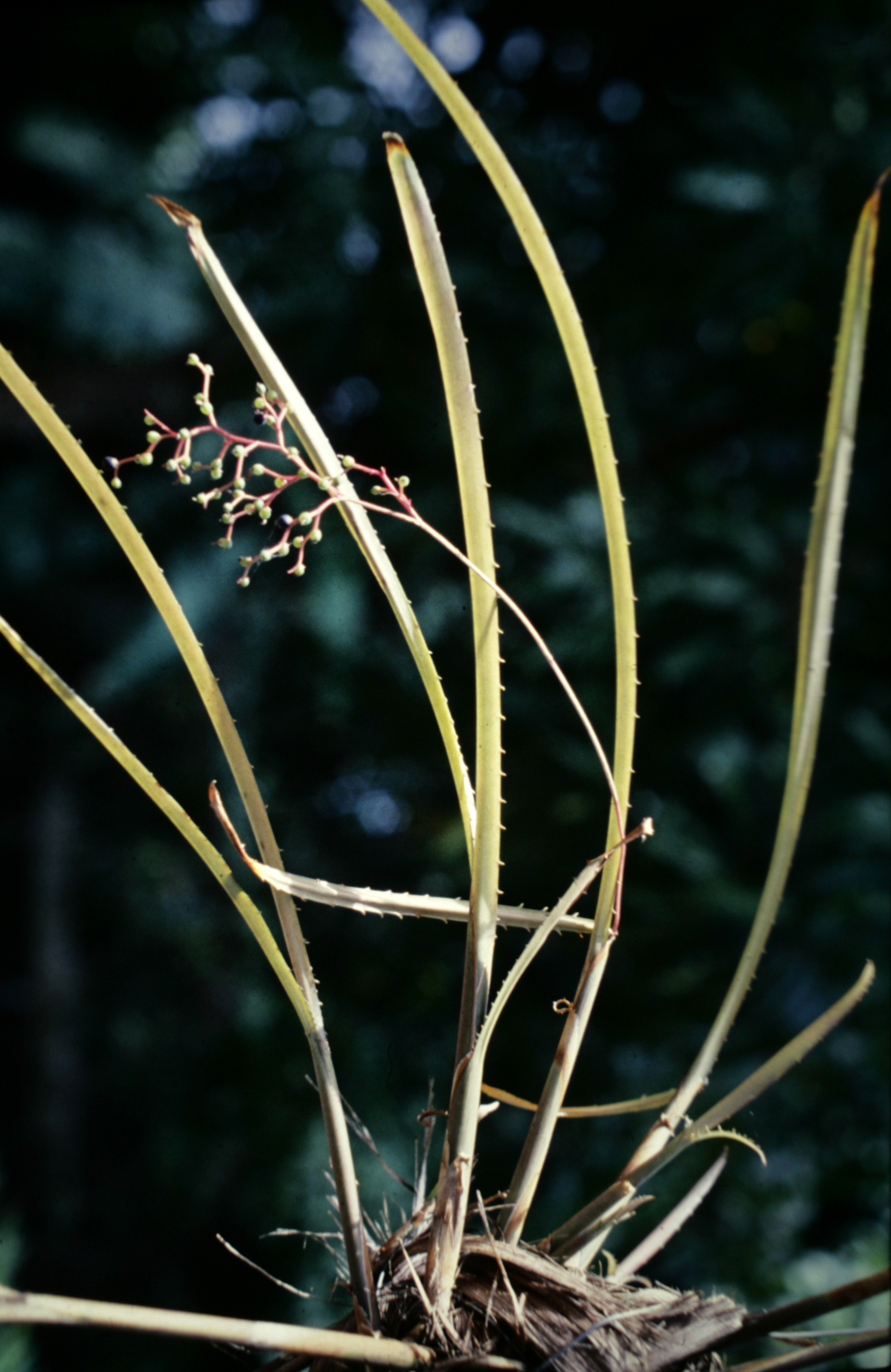
- Araeococcus flagellifolius

Scientific classification
- Kingdom: Plantae
- Clade: Tracheophytes
- Clade: Angiosperms
- Clade: Monocots
- Clade: Commelinids
- Order: Poales
- Family: Bromeliaceae
- Subfamily: Bromelioideae
- Genus: Araeococcus; Brongn.

= Araeococcus =

Genus of flowering plants

Araeococcus is a genus of the botanical family Bromeliaceae, subfamily Bromelioideae. It is native to northern South America, Central America and Trinidad.

The genus name is from the Greek araios (thin, weak, slight) and the Latin coccus (berry). It was divided into two subgenera, the type subgenus and subgenus Pseudaraeococcus, before the latter was raised to the separate genus Pseudaraeococcus in 2020.

== Species ==
Accepted species:

- Araeococcus flagellifolius Harms - Colombia, Venezuela, the Guianas, northern Brazil
- Araeococcus goeldianus L.B.Sm. - Amapá, French Guiana
- Araeococcus micranthus Brongn. - Trinidad & Tobago, Venezuela, the Guianas, northern Brazil
- Araeococcus pectinatus L.B.Sm. - Costa Rica, Panama, Colombia

Transferred to Pseudaraeococcus:

- Araeococcus chlorocarpus (Wawra) Leme & J.A. Siqueira → Pseudaraeococcus chlorocarpus - Bahia
- Araeococcus montanus Leme → Pseudaraeococcus montanus - Bahia
- Araeococcus nigropurpureus Leme & J.A. Siqueira → Pseudaraeococcus nigropurpureus - Bahia
- Araeococcus parviflorus (Martius & Schultes f.) Lindman → Pseudaraeococcus parviflorus - Bahia
- Araeococcus sessiliflorus Leme & J.A. Siqueira → Pseudaraeococcus sessiliflorus - Bahia
