= List of Agapetus species =

This is a list of 218 species in Agapetus, a genus of little black caddisflies in the family Glossosomatidae.

== Agapetus species ==
- Agapetus abbreviatus Ulmer, 1913^{i c g}
- Agapetus ablusus Neboiss, 1986^{i c g}
- Agapetus acuductus (Harris, 1828)^{i c g}
- Agapetus adejensis Enderlein, 1929^{i c g}
- Agapetus agilis (Barnard, 1934)^{i c g}
- Agapetus agtuuganonis Mey, 1997^{i c g}
- Agapetus aineias Malicky, 1997^{i c g}
- Agapetus ajpetriensis Martynov, 1916^{i c g}
- Agapetus alabamensis Harris, 1986^{i c g}
- Agapetus alarum Gibon, 2017^{g}
- Agapetus albomaculatus (Kimmins, 1953)^{i c g}
- Agapetus aliceae Neboiss & Botosaneanu, 1988^{i c g}
- Agapetus altineri Sipahiler, 1989^{i c g}
- Agapetus anakdacing Malicky, 1995^{i c g}
- Agapetus anaksatu Malicky, 1995^{i c g}
- Agapetus anatolicus (Cakin, 1983)^{i c g}
- Agapetus annulicornis Matsumura, 1931^{i c g}
- Agapetus antikena Schmid, 1959^{i c g}
- Agapetus antilochos Malicky, 1998^{i c g}
- Agapetus antiyaka Schmid, 1959^{i c g}
- Agapetus anuragoda Schmid, 1958^{i c g}
- Agapetus apalapsili (Malicky, 1978)^{i c g}
- Agapetus arcita Denning, 1951^{i c g}
- Agapetus armatus (McLachlan, 1879)^{i c g}
- Agapetus artesus Ross, 1938^{i c g}
- Agapetus arvernensis (Malicky, 1980)^{i c g}
- Agapetus atuus Malicky & Chantaramongkol, 1992^{i c g}
- Agapetus avitus Edwards, 1956^{i c g}
- Agapetus ayodhia Schmid, 1958^{i c g}
- Agapetus azureus (Stephens, 1829)^{i c g}
- Agapetus baptos Mey, 1998^{i c g}
- Agapetus barang Olah, 1988^{i c g}
- Agapetus basagureni Gonzalez & Botosaneanu, 1995^{i c g}
- Agapetus belarecus Botosaneanu, 1957^{i c g}
- Agapetus beredensis Dakki & Malicky, 1980^{i c g}
- Agapetus bidens McLachlan, 1875^{i c g}
- Agapetus bifidus Denning, 1949^{i c g}
- Agapetus birgi (Sipahiler, 1989)^{i c g}
- Agapetus boulderensis Milne, 1936^{i c g}
- Agapetus budoensis Kobayashi, 1982^{i c g}
- Agapetus caimoc Olah, 1988^{i c g}
- Agapetus cannensis ^{g}
- Agapetus cataractae Ulmer, 1951^{i c g}
- Agapetus caucasicus Martynov, 1913^{i c g}
- Agapetus celatus McLachlan, 1871^{i c g}
- Agapetus cenumarus Malicky & Chantaramongkol, 1992^{i c g}
- Agapetus chiangi ^{g}
- Agapetus chinensis (Mosely, 1942)^{i c g}
- Agapetus chitraliorum Schmid, 1959^{i c g}
- Agapetus christineae ^{g}
- Agapetus clio (Malicky, 1976)^{i c g}
- Agapetus cocandicus McLachlan, 1875^{i c g}
- Agapetus cornutus Denning, 1958^{i c g}
- Agapetus cralus (Mosely in Mosely & Kimmins, 1953)^{i c g}
- Agapetus crasmus Ross, 1939^{i c g}
- Agapetus cravensis Giudicelli, 1973^{i c g}
- Agapetus curvidens Ulmer, 1930^{i c g}
- Agapetus cyrenensis Mosely, 1930^{i c g}
- Agapetus cyrnensis Mosely, 1930^{g}
- Agapetus dagunagari Malicky, 1995^{i c g}
- Agapetus dakkii Malicky & Lounaci, 1987^{i c g}
- Agapetus danbang Olah, 1988^{i c g}
- Agapetus dangorum Olah, 1988^{i c g}
- Agapetus dayi Ross, 1956^{i c g}
- Agapetus degrangei (Vaillant, 1967)^{i c g}
- Agapetus delicatulus McLachlan, 1884^{i c g}
- Agapetus denningi Ross, 1951^{i c g}
- Agapetus dentatus (Kimmins, 1953)^{i c g}
- Agapetus desom Olah, 1988^{i c g}
- Agapetus diacanthus Edwards, 1956^{i c g}
- Agapetus diversus (McLachlan, 1884)^{i c g}
- Agapetus dolichopterus Giudicelli & Dakki, 1980^{i c g}
- Agapetus dubitans (McLachlan, 1879)^{i c g}
- Agapetus dundungra ^{g}
- Agapetus episkopi Malicky, 1972^{i c g}
- Agapetus eriopus Mey, 1996^{i c g}
- Agapetus esinertus Malicky & Chantaramongkol, 1992^{i c g}
- Agapetus evansi Ross, 1956^{i c g}
- Agapetus excisus Kimmins, 1953^{i c g}
- Agapetus foliatus (Kimmins, 1953)^{i c g}
- Agapetus formosanus ^{g}
- Agapetus fuscipes Curtis, 1834^{i c g}
- Agapetus fuscus Vaillant, 1954^{i c g}
- Agapetus gelbae Ross, 1947^{i c g}
- Agapetus gonophorus Mey, 1996^{i c g}
- Agapetus gorgitensis Sipahiler, 1996^{i c g}
- Agapetus gotgian Olah, 1988^{i c g}
- Agapetus grahami Ross, 1956^{i c g}
- Agapetus gunungus Neboiss & Botosaneanu, 1988^{i c g}
- Agapetus hadimensis Sipahiler, 1996^{i c g}
- Agapetus halong Olah, 1988^{i c g}
- Agapetus hamatus Ross, 1956^{i c g}
- Agapetus hanumata Schmid, 1958^{i c g}
- Agapetus hellenorum (Malicky, 1984)^{i c g}
- Agapetus hessi Leonard & Leonard, 1949^{i c g}
- Agapetus hieianus (Tsuda, 1942)^{i c g}
- Agapetus himalayanus (Martynov, 1935)^{i c}
- Agapetus illini Ross, 1938^{i c g}
- Agapetus inaequispinosus Schmid, 1970^{i c g}
- Agapetus incertulus McLachlan, 1884^{i c g}
- Agapetus incurvatus (Kimmins, 1953)^{i c g}
- Agapetus insons (McLachlan, 1879)^{i c g}
- Agapetus iridipennis (McLachlan, 1879)^{i c g}
- Agapetus iridis Ross, 1944^{i c g}
- Agapetus jafiwi Ross, 1951^{i c g}
- Agapetus jakutorum Martynov, 1934^{i c g}
- Agapetus japonicus (Tsuda, 1942)^{i c g}
- Agapetus jiriensis Malicky, 1995^{i c g}
- Agapetus joannia Denning, 1965^{i c g}
- Agapetus jocassee Morse in Morse, Hamilton & Hoffman, 1989^{i c g}
- Agapetus karabagi Cakin, 1983^{i c g}
- Agapetus kashmirensis Kimmins, 1953^{i c g}
- Agapetus kimminsi Ross, 1956^{i c g}
- Agapetus kirgisorum Martynov, 1927^{i c g}
- Agapetus kithmalie (Chantaramongkol & Malicky, 1986)^{i c g}
- Agapetus komanus (Tsuda, 1942)^{i c g}
- Agapetus kongcanxing Olah, 1988^{i c g}
- Agapetus krawanyi (Ulmer, 1938)^{i c g}
- Agapetus kumudumalie (Chantaramongkol & Malicky, 1986)^{i c g}
- Agapetus lalus Malicky & Chantaramongkol, 1992^{i c g}
- Agapetus laniger Pictet, 1834^{i c g}
- Agapetus laparus Neboiss, 1977^{i c g}
- Agapetus latosus Ross, 1951^{i c g}
- Agapetus lepetimnos Malicky, 1976^{i c g}
- Agapetus limsusan Olah, 1993^{i c g}
- Agapetus lindus Neboiss & Botosaneanu, 1988^{i c g}
- Agapetus longipennis ^{g}
- Agapetus loxozona Mey, 1997^{i c g}
- Agapetus lundbladi (Mosely, 1938)^{i c g}
- Agapetus lusitanicus (Malicky, 1980)^{i c g}
- Agapetus mahadhyandika (Schmid, 1959)^{i c g}
- Agapetus maharikhita (Schmid, 1959)^{i c g}
- Agapetus malleatus Banks, 1914^{i c g}
- Agapetus marlierorum (Botosaneanu, 1980)^{i c g}
- Agapetus marlo Milne, 1936^{i c g}
- Agapetus medicus Ross, 1938^{i c g}
- Agapetus membrosus Ross, 1951^{i c g}
- Agapetus minutus Sibley, 1926^{i c g}
- Agapetus mitis (Kimmins, 1953)^{i c g}
- Agapetus mittamitta ^{g}
- Agapetus montanus Denning, 1949^{i c g}
- Agapetus monticolus Banks, 1939^{i c g}
- Agapetus moselyi (Ulmer, 1938)^{i c g}
- Agapetus mossmanensis ^{g}
- Agapetus muelleri ^{g}
- Agapetus murinus (Barnard, 1934)^{i c g}
- Agapetus neboissi ^{g}
- Agapetus nimbulus McLachlan, 1879^{i c g}
- Agapetus nivodacus Ivanov, 1992^{i c g}
- Agapetus nokowoula Neboiss, 1986^{i c g}
- Agapetus numidicus Vaillant, 1954^{i c g}
- Agapetus oblongatus Martynov, 1913^{i c g}
- Agapetus obscurus Walker, 1852^{i c g}
- Agapetus occidentalis Denning, 1949^{i c g}
- Agapetus occidentis Denning, 1949^{i c g}
- Agapetus ochripes Curtis, 1834^{i c g}
- Agapetus ohiya Kimmins, 1953^{i c g}
- Agapetus oramatama (Malicky, 1978)^{i c g}
- Agapetus orontes Malicky, 1980^{i c g}
- Agapetus orosus Denning, 1950^{i c g}
- Agapetus paluma ^{g}
- Agapetus paracralus ^{g}
- Agapetus pedarius Mey, 1997^{i c g}
- Agapetus pinatus Ross, 1938^{i c g}
- Agapetus placidus (Navas, 1918)^{i c g}
- Agapetus pontona (Mosely in Mosely & Kimmins, 1953)^{i c g}
- Agapetus productus (Kimmins, 1962)^{i c g}
- Agapetus punctatus Hagen, 1859^{i c g}
- Agapetus punjabicus (Martynov, 1936)^{i c g}
- Agapetus quadratus Mosely, 1930^{i c g}
- Agapetus quordus Malicky & Chantaramongkol, 1992^{i c g}
- Agapetus rama Schmid, 1958^{i c g}
- Agapetus ranohelae Gibon, 2017^{g}
- Agapetus rawana Schmid, 1958^{i c g}
- Agapetus rectigonopoda Botosaneanu, 1957^{i c g}
- Agapetus rossi Denning, 1941^{i c g b}
- Agapetus rudis Hagen, 1859^{i c g}
- Agapetus rupestris Mey, 1996^{i c g}
- Agapetus salomonis (Kimmins, 1957)^{i c g}
- Agapetus sarayensis Sipahiler, 1996^{i c g}
- Agapetus segovicus Schmid, 1952^{i c g}
- Agapetus serotinus (Navas, 1919)^{i c g}
- Agapetus setiferus Stephens, 1836^{i c g}
- Agapetus sexipalpus Jacquemart & Statzner, 1981^{i c g}
- Agapetus sheldoni ^{g}
- Agapetus sibiricus Martynov, 1918^{i c g}
- Agapetus sindis Kimmins, 1953^{i c g}
- Agapetus sita Schmid, 1958^{i c g}
- Agapetus slavorum Botosaneanu, 1960^{i c g}
- Agapetus spinosus Etnier & Way, 1973^{i c g}
- Agapetus stclairae ^{g}
- Agapetus tadzhikorum Ivanov, 1992^{i c g}
- Agapetus taho Ross, 1947^{i c g}
- Agapetus tamrangensis (Kimmins, 1964)^{i c g}
- Agapetus tapaiacus Schmid, 1965^{i c g}
- Agapetus tasmanicus (Mosely in Mosely & Kimmins, 1953)^{i c g}
- Agapetus tenuis ^{g}
- Agapetus theischingeri Malicky, 1980^{i c g}
- Agapetus tomus Ross, 1941^{i c g}
- Agapetus torautus Neboiss & Botosaneanu, 1988^{i c g}
- Agapetus triangularis Martynov, 1935^{i c g}
- Agapetus tridens McLachlan, 1875^{i c g}
- Agapetus truncatus Martynov, 1913^{i c g}
- Agapetus tubrabucca ^{g}
- Agapetus turcomanorum Schmid, 1959^{i c g}
- Agapetus uiguricus Mey, 1993^{i c g}
- Agapetus ulmeri Ross, 1951^{i c g}
- Agapetus ungulatus (Mosely, 1939)^{i c g}
- Agapetus unicuspidalis (Mey, 1990)^{i c g}
- Agapetus vercondarius Malicky & Chantaramongkol, 1992^{i c g}
- Agapetus vicanthicus Neboiss, 1988^{i c g}
- Agapetus vireo Ross, 1941^{i c g}
- Agapetus viricatus Malicky & Chantaramongkol, 1992^{i c g}
- Agapetus voccus Malicky & Chantaramongkol, 1992^{i c g}
- Agapetus walkeri (Betten & Mosely, 1940)^{i c g}
- Agapetus yasensis (Tsuda, 1942)^{i c g}
- Agapetus zniachtl Malicky, 1995^{i c g}
- Agapetus zwicki ^{g}

Data sources: i = ITIS, c = Catalogue of Life, g = GBIF, b = Bugguide.net
