= A. montanus =

A. montanus may refer to:

- Acanthus montanus, or mountain thistle
- Adaina montanus, a moth
- Aenetus montanus, a moth
- Agapetus montanus, a caddisfly
- Alsodes montanus, a frog
- Anthodiscus montanus, a plant of the family Caryocaraceae
- Araeococcus montanus, a synonym of Pseudaraeococcus montanus, a plant of the family Bromeliaceae
- Astylosternus montanus, a frog

== See also ==
- Montanus (disambiguation)
