= List of Glossosoma species =

This is a list of 116 species in Glossosoma, a genus of little black caddisflies in the family Glossosomatidae.

== Glossosoma species ==
- Glossosoma abhikhara Schmid, 1959^{i c g}
- Glossosoma abhisares Schmid, 1971^{i c g}
- Glossosoma aequale Banks, 1940^{i c g}
- Glossosoma agarenorum Schmid, 1959^{i c g}
- Glossosoma alascense Banks, 1900^{i c g}
- Glossosoma ali Mey, 1996^{i c g}
- Glossosoma altaicum (Martynov, 1914)^{i c g}
- Glossosoma ambhi Schmid, 1959^{i c g}
- Glossosoma anakemei Malicky, 1995^{i c g}
- Glossosoma anakgunung Malicky, 1995^{i c g}
- Glossosoma anaktana Malicky, 1995^{i c g}
- Glossosoma anale Martynov, 1931^{i c g}
- Glossosoma angaricum (Levanidova, 1967)^{i c g}
- Glossosoma atchintitam Schmid, 1971^{i c g}
- Glossosoma atestas Malicky & Chantaramongkol, 1992^{i c g}
- Glossosoma atitto Malicky & Chantaramongkol, 1992^{i c g}
- Glossosoma atreju Malicky, 1986^{i c g}
- Glossosoma atrichum Ross, 1956^{i c g}
- Glossosoma aveleta Ross & Hwang, 1953^{i c g}
- Glossosoma baclava Malicky, 1972^{i c g}
- Glossosoma bahukantakam Schmid, 1971^{i c g}
- Glossosoma balephiana Malicky, 1995^{i c g}
- Glossosoma beaumonti Schmid, 1947^{i c g}
- Glossosoma bifidum McLachlan, 1879^{g}
- Glossosoma boltoni Curtis, 1834^{i c g}
- Glossosoma bruna Denning, 1954^{i c g}
- Glossosoma bukitanum Malicky, 1978^{i c g}
- Glossosoma bunae Marinkovic, 1988^{g}
- Glossosoma burmanum Kimmins, 1953^{i c g}
- Glossosoma califica Denning, 1948^{i c g}
- Glossosoma capitatum Martynov, 1913^{i c g}
- Glossosoma caudatum Martynov, 1931^{i c g}
- Glossosoma confluens Kimmins, 1953^{i c g}
- Glossosoma conforme Neboiss, 1963^{i c g}
- Glossosoma conformis Neboiss, 1963^{g}
- Glossosoma dentatum McLachlan, 1875^{i c g}
- Glossosoma develi Malicky, 1972^{i c g}
- Glossosoma dirghakantakam Schmid, 1971^{i c g}
- Glossosoma discophorum Klapálek, 1902^{i c g}
- Glossosoma dulkejti (Martynov, 1934)^{i c g}
- Glossosoma dusmeti Navas, 1920^{i c g}
- Glossosoma elvisso Malicky & Chantaramongkol, 1992^{i c g}
- Glossosoma excitum Ross, 1938^{i c g}
- Glossosoma furcatum Navás, 1932^{i c g}
- Glossosoma hazbanicum Botosaneanu in Botosaneanu & Gasith, 1971^{i c g}
- Glossosoma heliakreya Schmid, 1959^{i c g}
- Glossosoma hemantajam Schmid, 1971^{i c g}
- Glossosoma himalayanum (Martynov, 1930)^{i c g}
- Glossosoma hissarica Ivanov, 1992^{i c g}
- Glossosoma hospitum (Tsuda, 1940)^{i c g}
- Glossosoma idaho Ross, 1941^{i c g}
- Glossosoma inops (Tsuda, 1940)^{i c g}
- Glossosoma intermedium (Klapalek, 1892)^{i c g}
- Glossosoma japonicum Kobayashi, 1972^{i c g}
- Glossosoma javanicum Ulmer, 1930^{i c g}
- Glossosoma jentumar Malicky & Chantaramongkol, 1992^{i c g}
- Glossosoma kamarasikam Schmid, 1971^{i c g}
- Glossosoma kchinam Schmid, 1971^{i c g}
- Glossosoma kelleyi Ross, 1956^{i c g}
- Glossosoma kiritchenkoi (Martynov, 1927)^{i c g}
- Glossosoma kirke Malicky, 2003^{g}
- Glossosoma kissottoi Malicky, 1997^{i c g}
- Glossosoma klotho Malicky, 2003^{g}
- Glossosoma krichnarunam Schmid, 1971^{i c g}
- Glossosoma lividum (Hagen, 1861)^{i c g}
- Glossosoma mahasiah Malicky, 2014^{g}
- Glossosoma malayanum Banks, 1934^{i c g}
- Glossosoma melikertes Malicky, 2003^{g}
- Glossosoma mereca Denning, 1948^{i c g}
- Glossosoma minutum (Martynov, 1927)^{i c g}
- Glossosoma montana Ross, 1941^{i c g}
- Glossosoma moselyi Kimmins, 1953^{i c g}
- Glossosoma neffi Arefina, 2000^{i c g}
- Glossosoma neretvae Marinkovic, 1988^{g}
- Glossosoma nichinkata Schmid, 1971^{i c g}
- Glossosoma nigrior Banks, 1911^{i c g b}
- Glossosoma nigroroseum Schmid, 1971^{i c g}
- Glossosoma nylanderi McLachlan, 1879^{i c g}
- Glossosoma oregonense Ling, 1938^{i c g}
- Glossosoma orientale Kimmins, 1953^{i c g}
- Glossosoma parvulum Banks, 1904^{i c g}
- Glossosoma penitus Banks, 1914^{i c g}
- Glossosoma persicum Jacquemart, 1965^{i c g}
- Glossosoma pinigisana Malicky, 1994^{i c g}
- Glossosoma privatum McLachlan, 1884^{i c g}
- Glossosoma pterna Ross, 1947^{i c g}
- Glossosoma pyroxum Ross, 1941^{i c g}
- Glossosoma sadoense Kobayashi, 1982^{i c g}
- Glossosoma schuhi Ross, 1947^{i c g}
- Glossosoma sellatum Ross & Hwang, 1953^{i c g}
- Glossosoma sequoia Denning, 1973^{i c g}
- Glossosoma shugnanica Ivanov, 1992^{i c g}
- Glossosoma sikkimense ^{g}
- Glossosoma speculare Kobayashi, 1972^{i c g}
- Glossosoma spinatum Ruiter, 2000^{i c g}
- Glossosoma spoliatum McLachlan, 1879^{i c g}
- Glossosoma subaequale Schmid, 1971^{i c g}
- Glossosoma sumitaensis Kobayashi, 1982^{i c g}
- Glossosoma taeniatum Ross & Hwang, 1953^{i c g}
- Glossosoma taiwanensis ^{g}
- Glossosoma timurense Martynov, 1927^{i c g}
- Glossosoma traviatum Banks, 1936^{i c g}
- Glossosoma tripartitum Schmid, 1971^{i c g}
- Glossosoma tunceliensis Sipahiler in Sipahiler & Malicky, 1987^{i c g}
- Glossosoma tunpuensis ^{g}
- Glossosoma unguiculatum Martynov, 1925^{i c g}
- Glossosoma uogalanum Kobayashi, 1982^{i c g}
- Glossosoma ussuricum (Martynov, 1934)^{i c g}
- Glossosoma valvatum Ulmer, 1926^{i c g}
- Glossosoma vaneyam Schmid, 1971^{i c g}
- Glossosoma varjakantakam Schmid, 1971^{i c g}
- Glossosoma velona Ross, 1938^{i c g}
- Glossosoma ventrale Banks, 1904^{i c g}
- Glossosoma verdonum Ross, 1938^{i c g}
- Glossosoma wenatchee Ross & Spencer, 1952^{i c g}
- Glossosoma yigilca Sipahiler, 1996^{i c g}

Data sources: i = ITIS, c = Catalogue of Life, g = GBIF, b = Bugguide.net
