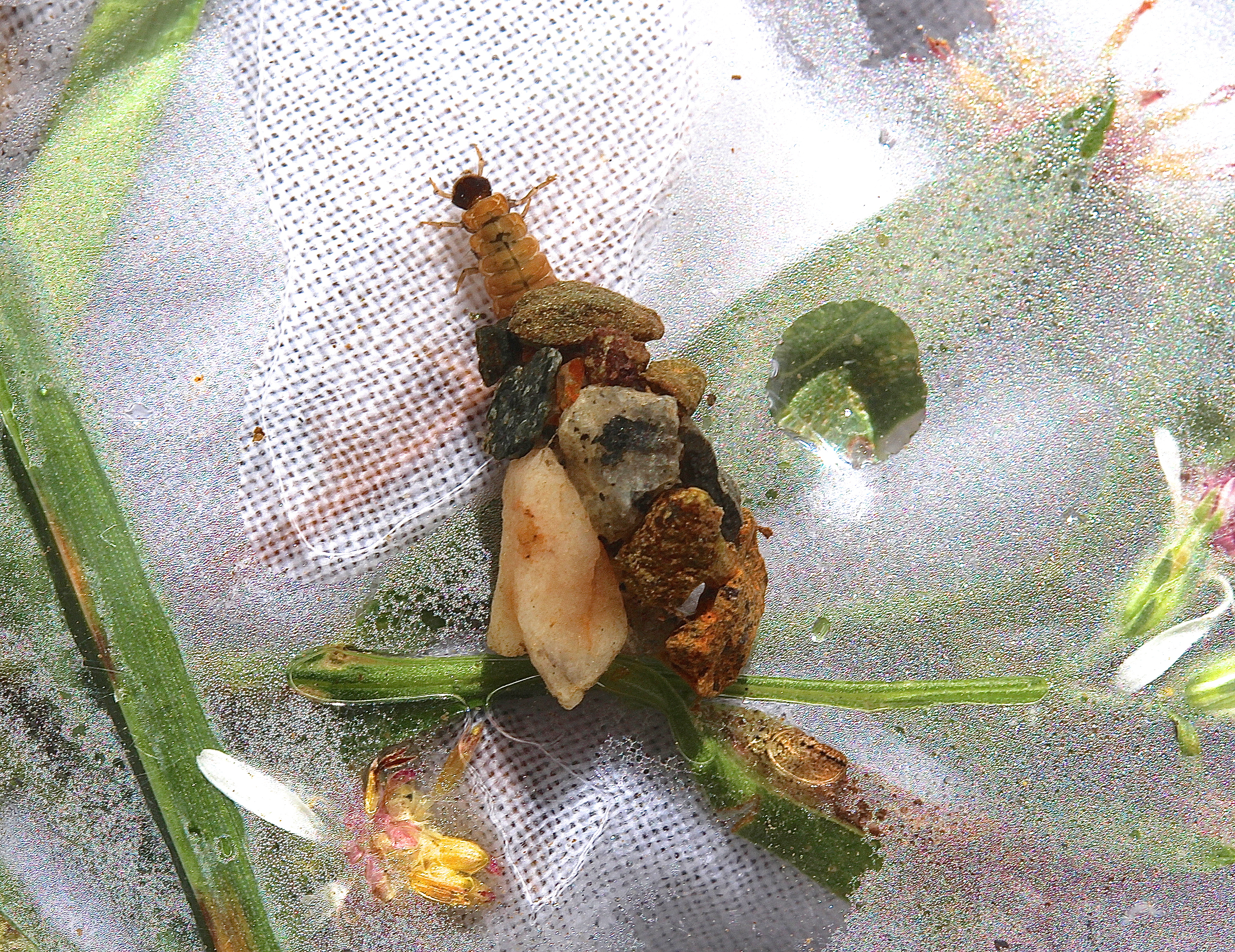

Scientific classification
- Domain: Eukaryota
- Kingdom: Animalia
- Phylum: Arthropoda
- Class: Insecta
- Order: Trichoptera
- Family: Glossosomatidae
- Genus: Glossosoma
- Species: G. nigrior

Binomial name
- Glossosoma nigrior Banks, 1911

= Glossosoma nigrior =

Species of caddisfly

Glossosoma nigrior is a species of little black caddisfly in the family Glossosomatidae. It is found in North America.
