= Agapetus rossi =

Scientific classification
- Domain: Eukaryota
- Kingdom: Animalia
- Phylum: Arthropoda
- Class: Insecta
- Order: Trichoptera
- Family: Glossosomatidae
- Genus: Agapetus
- Species: A. rossi

Binomial name
- Agapetus rossi Denning, 1941

Species of caddisfly

Agapetus rossi is a species of little black caddisfly in the family Glossosomatidae. It is found in North America.
