= Culoptila aluca =

Scientific classification
- Domain: Eukaryota
- Kingdom: Animalia
- Phylum: Arthropoda
- Class: Insecta
- Order: Trichoptera
- Family: Glossosomatidae
- Genus: Culoptila
- Species: C. aluca

Binomial name
- Culoptila aluca Mosely, 1954

Species of caddisfly

Culoptila aluca is a species of little black caddisfly in the family Glossosomatidae. It is found in Central America.
