= Culoptila aguilerai =

Culoptila aguilerai Temporal range: Middle Miocene

Scientific classification
- Domain: Eukaryota
- Kingdom: Animalia
- Phylum: Arthropoda
- Class: Insecta
- Order: Trichoptera
- Family: Glossosomatidae
- Genus: Culoptila
- Species: C. aguilerai

Binomial name
- Culoptila aguilerai Wichard et al., 2006

Extinct species of caddisfly

Culoptila aguilerai is a species of caddisfly, known from fossils preserved in Mexican amber. The species is named after Eliseo Palacios Aguilera.
