= Anagapetus bernea =

Scientific classification
- Domain: Eukaryota
- Kingdom: Animalia
- Phylum: Arthropoda
- Class: Insecta
- Order: Trichoptera
- Family: Glossosomatidae
- Genus: Anagapetus
- Species: A. bernea

Binomial name
- Anagapetus bernea Ross, 1947

Species of caddisfly

Anagapetus bernea is a species of little black caddisfly in the family Glossosomatidae. It is found in North America. It was named in 1947.
