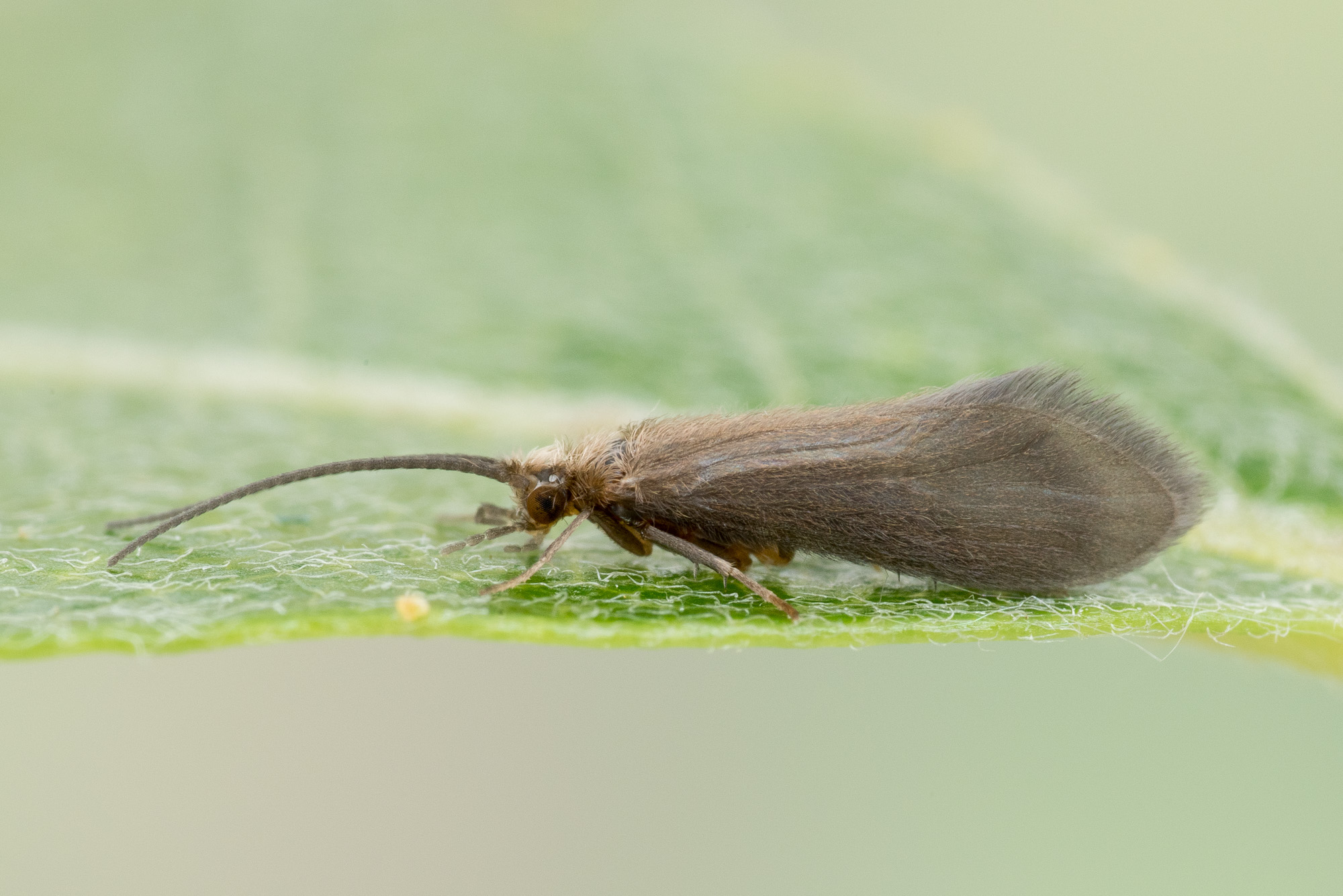

Scientific classification
- Domain: Eukaryota
- Kingdom: Animalia
- Phylum: Arthropoda
- Class: Insecta
- Order: Trichoptera
- Family: Glossosomatidae
- Genus: Agapetus
- Species: A. ochripes

Binomial name
- Agapetus ochripes Curtis, 1834

= Agapetus ochripes =

Species of caddisfly

Agapetus ochripes is a species of insect belonging to the family Glossosomatidae.

It is native to Europe.
