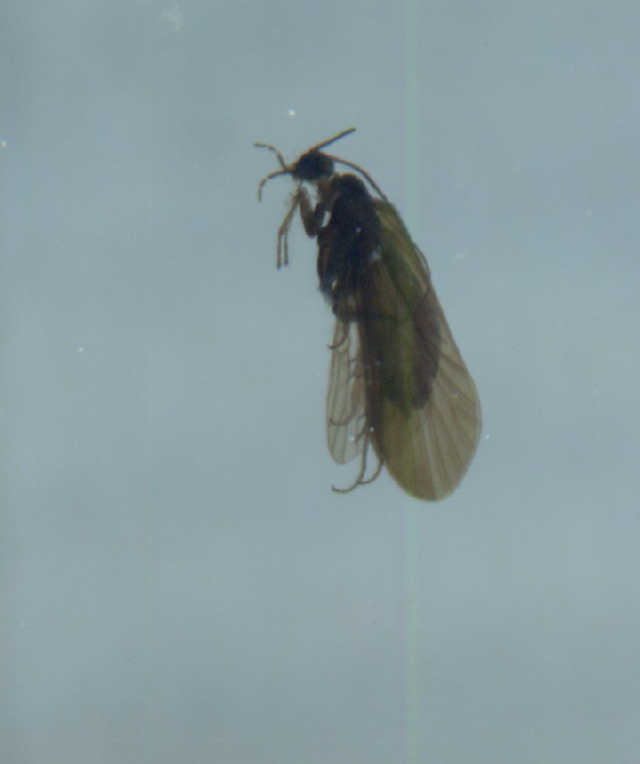

Scientific classification
- Kingdom: Animalia
- Phylum: Arthropoda
- Clade: Pancrustacea
- Class: Insecta
- Order: Trichoptera
- Suborder: Integripalpia
- Superfamily: Glossosomatoidea

Families
- Glossosomatidae; Pticolepidae

= Glossosomatoidea =

Caddisflies

Superfamily of caddisflies

The Glossosomatoidea are a superfamily of the class Insecta and order Trichoptera, described in 1891 by Wallengren.
