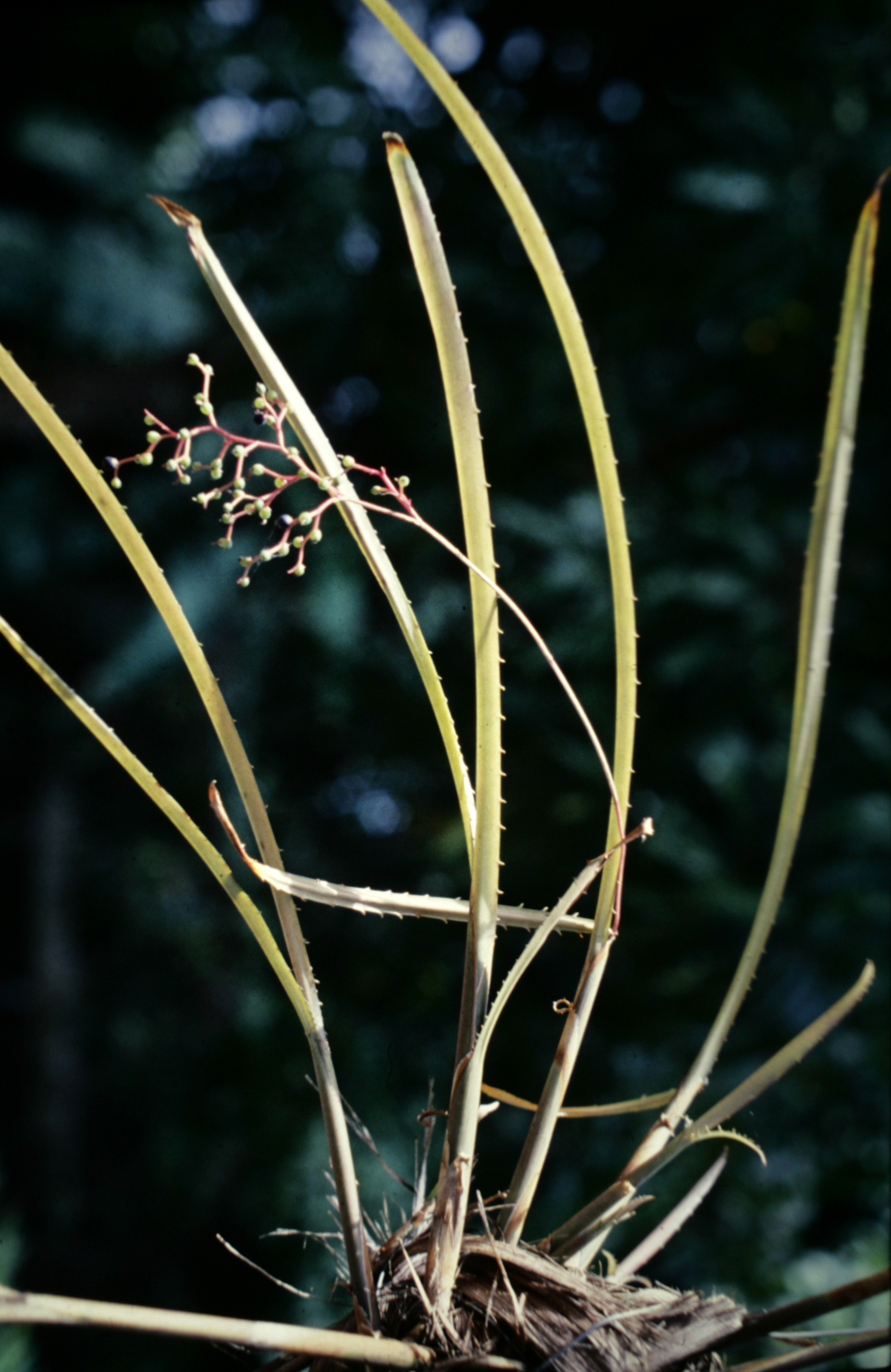

Scientific classification
- Kingdom: Plantae
- Clade: Tracheophytes
- Clade: Angiosperms
- Clade: Monocots
- Clade: Commelinids
- Order: Poales
- Family: Bromeliaceae
- Genus: Araeococcus
- Species: A. flagellifolius

Binomial name
- Araeococcus flagellifolius Harms

= Araeococcus flagellifolius =

Species of flowering plant

Araeococcus flagellifolius is a plant species in the genus Araeococcus. This species is native to northern South America (Colombia, Venezuela, the Guianas, northern Brazil).
