= Anagapetus =

Scientific classification
- Kingdom: Animalia
- Phylum: Arthropoda
- Clade: Pancrustacea
- Class: Insecta
- Order: Trichoptera
- Family: Glossosomatidae
- Subfamily: Glossosomatinae
- Genus: Anagapetus; Ross, 1938

Genus of caddisflies

Anagapetus is a genus of little black caddisflies in the family Glossosomatidae. There are about seven described species in Anagapetus.

== Species ==
These seven species belong to the genus Anagapetus:

- Anagapetus aisha Denning, 1964
- Anagapetus bernea Ross, 1947
- Anagapetus chandleri Ross, 1951
- Anagapetus debilis (Ross, 1938)
- Anagapetus hoodi Ross, 1951
- Anagapetus schmidi (Levanidova, 1979)
- Anagapetus thirza Denning, 1965
