= Pseudaraeococcus =

Scientific classification
- Kingdom: Plantae
- Clade: Embryophytes
- Clade: Tracheophytes
- Clade: Spermatophytes
- Clade: Angiosperms
- Clade: Monocots
- Clade: Commelinids
- Order: Poales
- Family: Bromeliaceae
- Subfamily: Bromelioideae
- Genus: Pseudaraeococcus (Mez) R.A.Pontes & Versieux

Species
- See text.

Synonyms
- Araeococcus subg. Pseudaraeococcus

Genus of plants

Pseudaraeococcus is a genus of flowering plant in the family Bromeliaceae, native to northeastern Brazil. It was first described as the subgenus Pseudaraeococcus of the genus Araeococcus by Carl Christian Mez in 1935, and raised to a separate genus in 2020.

== Species ==
As of July 2026, Plants of the World Online accepted the following species:

- Pseudaraeococcus chlorocarpus (Wawra) R.A.Pontes & Versieux
- Pseudaraeococcus lageniformis (R.A.Pontes & Versieux) R.A.Pontes & Versieux
- Pseudaraeococcus montanus (Leme) R.A.Pontes & Versieux
- Pseudaraeococcus nigropurpureus (Leme & J.A.Siqueira) R.A.Pontes & Versieux
- Pseudaraeococcus parviflorus (Mart. ex Schult. & Schult.f.) R.A.Pontes & Versieux
- Pseudaraeococcus serranensis R.A.Pontes, E.H.Souza & Versieux
- Pseudaraeococcus sessiliflorus (Leme & J.A.Siqueira) R.A.Pontes & Versieux
