= Agapetus montanus =

Scientific classification
- Domain: Eukaryota
- Kingdom: Animalia
- Phylum: Arthropoda
- Class: Insecta
- Order: Trichoptera
- Family: Glossosomatidae
- Genus: Agapetus
- Species: A. montanus

Binomial name
- Agapetus montanus Denning 1949

Species of caddisfly

Agapetus montanus is a species of caddisfly. It is endemic to the north-western states of the United States of America.
