= Araeococcus pectinatus =

Scientific classification
- Kingdom: Plantae
- Clade: Tracheophytes
- Clade: Angiosperms
- Clade: Monocots
- Clade: Commelinids
- Order: Poales
- Family: Bromeliaceae
- Genus: Araeococcus
- Species: A. pectinatus

Binomial name
- Araeococcus pectinatus L.B.Smith

Species of flowering plant

Araeococcus pectinatus is a plant species in the genus Araeococcus. This species is native to Costa Rica, Panama, and Colombia.
