= Culoptila =

Scientific classification
- Kingdom: Animalia
- Phylum: Arthropoda
- Clade: Pancrustacea
- Class: Insecta
- Order: Trichoptera
- Family: Glossosomatidae
- Subfamily: Protoptilinae
- Genus: Culoptila; Mosely, 1954

Type species
- Culoptila aluca Mosely, 1954

Genus of caddisflies

Culoptila is a genus of caddisflies found primarily in Central America as well as the United States.

== Species ==
Culoptila contains the following species:

- Culoptila acaena Bueno-Soria & Santiago Fragoso, 1996
- Culoptila aguilerai Wichard et al., 2006
- Culoptila aluca Mosely, 1954
- Culoptila amberia Mosely, 1954
- Culoptila azulae Bueno-Soria & Santiago Fragoso, 1996
- Culoptila barrerai Bueno-Soria & Santiago Fragoso, 1996
- Culoptila bidentata Blahnik & Holzenthal, 2006
- Culoptila buenoi Blahnik & Holzenthal, 2006
- Culoptila cantha (Ross, 1938)
- Culoptila cascada Blahnik & Holzenthal, 2006
- Culoptila costaricensis Flint, 1974
- Culoptila denningi Bueno-Soria & Santiago Fragoso, 1996
- Culoptila hamata Blahnik & Holzenthal, 2006
- Culoptila jamapa Bueno-Soria & Santiago Fragoso, 1996
- Culoptila kimminsi Denning, 1965
- Culoptila montanensis Flint, 1967
- Culoptila moselyi Denning, 1965
- Culoptila nahuatl Flint, 1974
- Culoptila pararusia Blahnik & Holzenthal, 2006
- Culoptila plummerensis Blahnik & Holzenthal, 2006
- Culoptila rusia Mosely, 1954
- Culoptila saltena Mosely, 1954
- Culoptila tapanti Blahnik & Holzenthal, 2006
- Culoptila tarascanica Flint, 1974
- Culoptila thoracica (Ross, 1938)
- Culoptila unispina Blahnik & Holzenthal, 2006
- Culoptila vexillifera Blahnik & Holzenthal, 2006
