= Araeococcus micranthus =

Scientific classification
- Kingdom: Plantae
- Clade: Tracheophytes
- Clade: Angiosperms
- Clade: Monocots
- Clade: Commelinids
- Order: Poales
- Family: Bromeliaceae
- Genus: Araeococcus
- Species: A. micranthus

Binomial name
- Araeococcus micranthus Brongn.

Synonyms
- Aechmea micrantha Brongn.

Species of flowering plant

Araeococcus micranthus is a plant species in the genus Araeococcus. This species is native to Trinidad and Tobago, Venezuela, the Guianas, and northern Brazil.
