= Pseudaraeococcus chlorocarpus =

Scientific classification
- Kingdom: Plantae
- Clade: Tracheophytes
- Clade: Angiosperms
- Clade: Monocots
- Clade: Commelinids
- Order: Poales
- Family: Bromeliaceae
- Subfamily: Bromelioideae
- Genus: Pseudaraeococcus
- Species: P. chlorocarpus

Binomial name
- Pseudaraeococcus chlorocarpus (Wawra) R.A.Pontes & Versieux

Synonyms
- Araeococcus chlorocarpus (Wawra) Leme & J.A.Siqueira; Lamprococcus chlorocarpus Wawra

Species of flowering plant

Pseudaraeococcus chlorocarpus is a species of flowering plant in the family Bromeliaceae, native to Brazil (the state of Bahia). It was first described in 1862 as Lamprococcus chlorocarpus.
