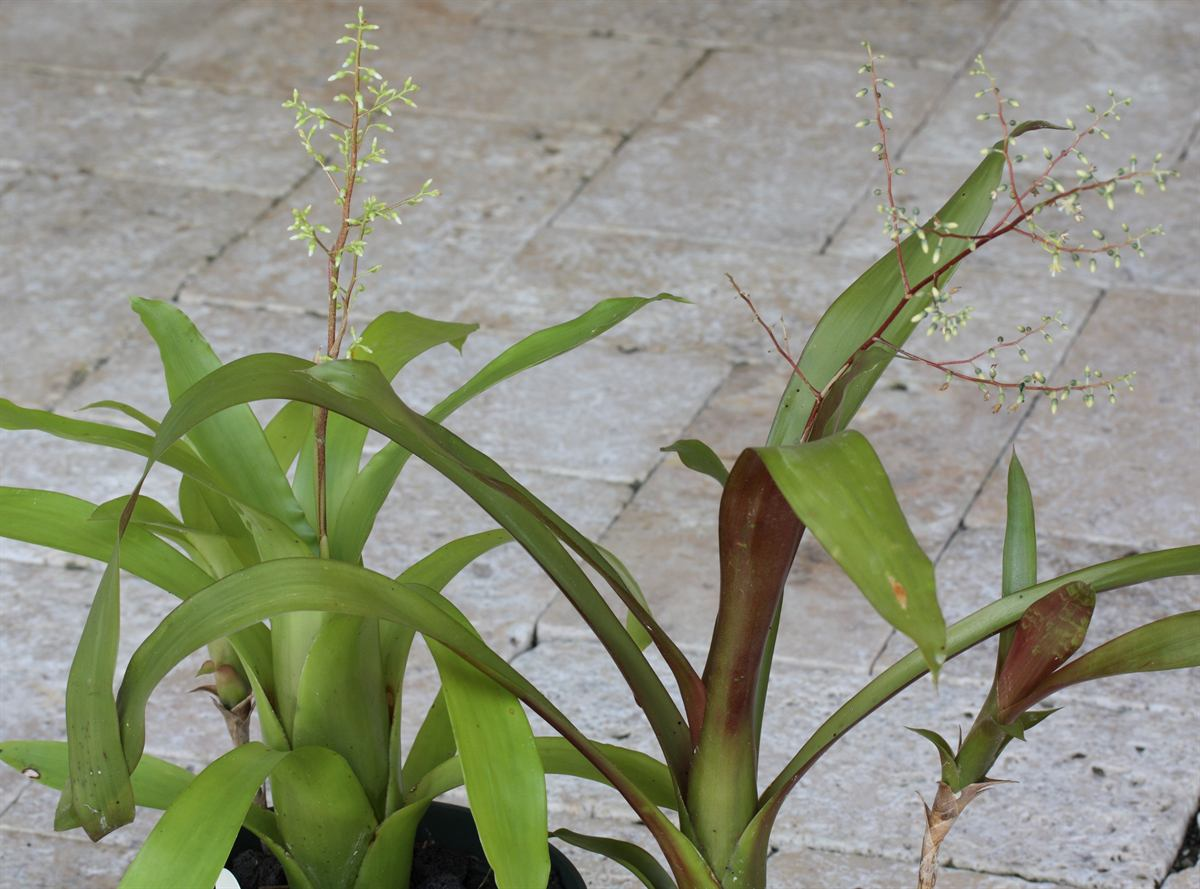

Scientific classification
- Kingdom: Plantae
- Clade: Tracheophytes
- Clade: Angiosperms
- Clade: Monocots
- Clade: Commelinids
- Order: Poales
- Family: Bromeliaceae
- Subfamily: Bromelioideae
- Genus: Pseudaraeococcus
- Species: P. parviflorus

Binomial name
- Pseudaraeococcus parviflorus (Mart. ex Schult. & Schult.f.) R.A.Pontes & Versieux

Synonyms
- Aechmea parviflora (Mart. ex Schult. & Schult.f.) Baker; Araeococcus parviflorus (Mart. ex Schult. & Schult.f.) Lindm.; Billbergia parviflora Mart. ex Schult. & Schult.f.

= Pseudaraeococcus parviflorus =

Species of flowering plant

Pseudaraeococcus parviflorus is a species of flowering plant in the family Bromeliaceae, endemic to Brazil (state of Bahia). It was first described in 1830 as Billbergia parviflora.
