= Pseudaraeococcus sessiliflorus =

Scientific classification
- Kingdom: Plantae
- Clade: Tracheophytes
- Clade: Angiosperms
- Clade: Monocots
- Clade: Commelinids
- Order: Poales
- Family: Bromeliaceae
- Subfamily: Bromelioideae
- Genus: Pseudaraeococcus
- Species: P. sessiliflorus

Binomial name
- Pseudaraeococcus sessiliflorus (Leme & J.A.Siqueira) R.A.Pontes & Versieux

Synonyms
- Araeococcus sessiliflorus Leme & J.A.Siqueira

Species of flowering plant

Pseudaraeococcus sessiliflorus is a species of flowering plant in the family Bromeliaceae, endemic to Brazil (the state of Bahia). It was first described in 2007 as Araeococcus sessiliflorus.
