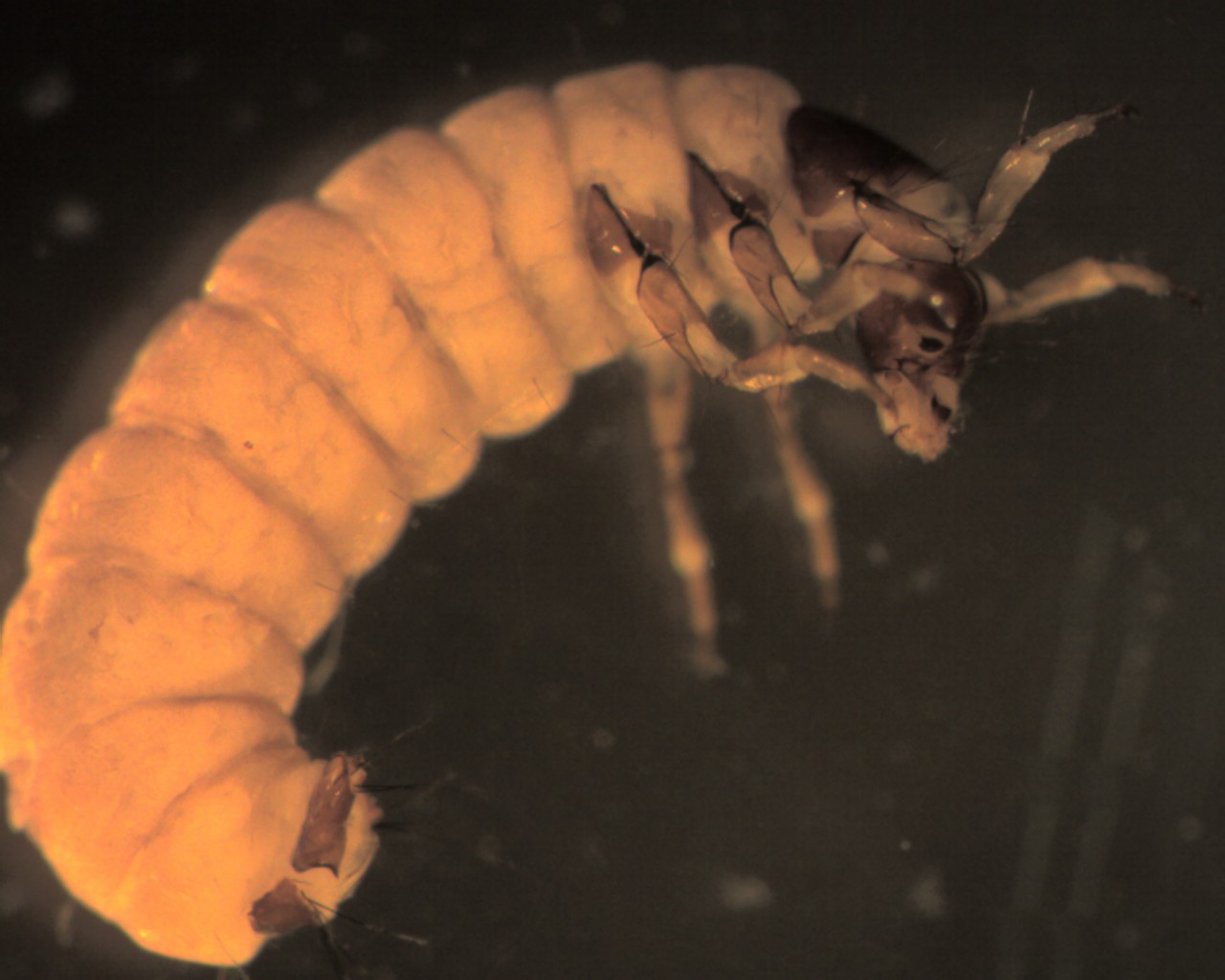

Scientific classification
- Domain: Eukaryota
- Kingdom: Animalia
- Phylum: Arthropoda
- Class: Insecta
- Order: Trichoptera
- Family: Glossosomatidae
- Subfamily: Glossosomatinae
- Genus: Glossosoma; Curtis, 1834

Subgenera
- Glossosoma (Anseriglossa) Ross, 1956; Glossosoma (Eomystra) Martynov, 1934; Glossosoma (Glossosoma) Curtis, 1834; Glossosoma (Lipoglossa) Martynov, 1930; Glossosoma (Muroglossa) Ross, 1956; Glossosoma (Protoglossa) Ross, 1956; Glossosoma (Ripaeglossa) Ross, 1956; Glossosoma (Sinoglossa) Ross, 1956; Glossosoma (Synafophora) Martynov, 1927

Diversity
- at least 110 species

= Glossosoma =

Genus of caddisflies

Glossosoma is a genus of little black caddisflies in the family Glossosomatidae. There are more than 110 described species in Glossosoma.

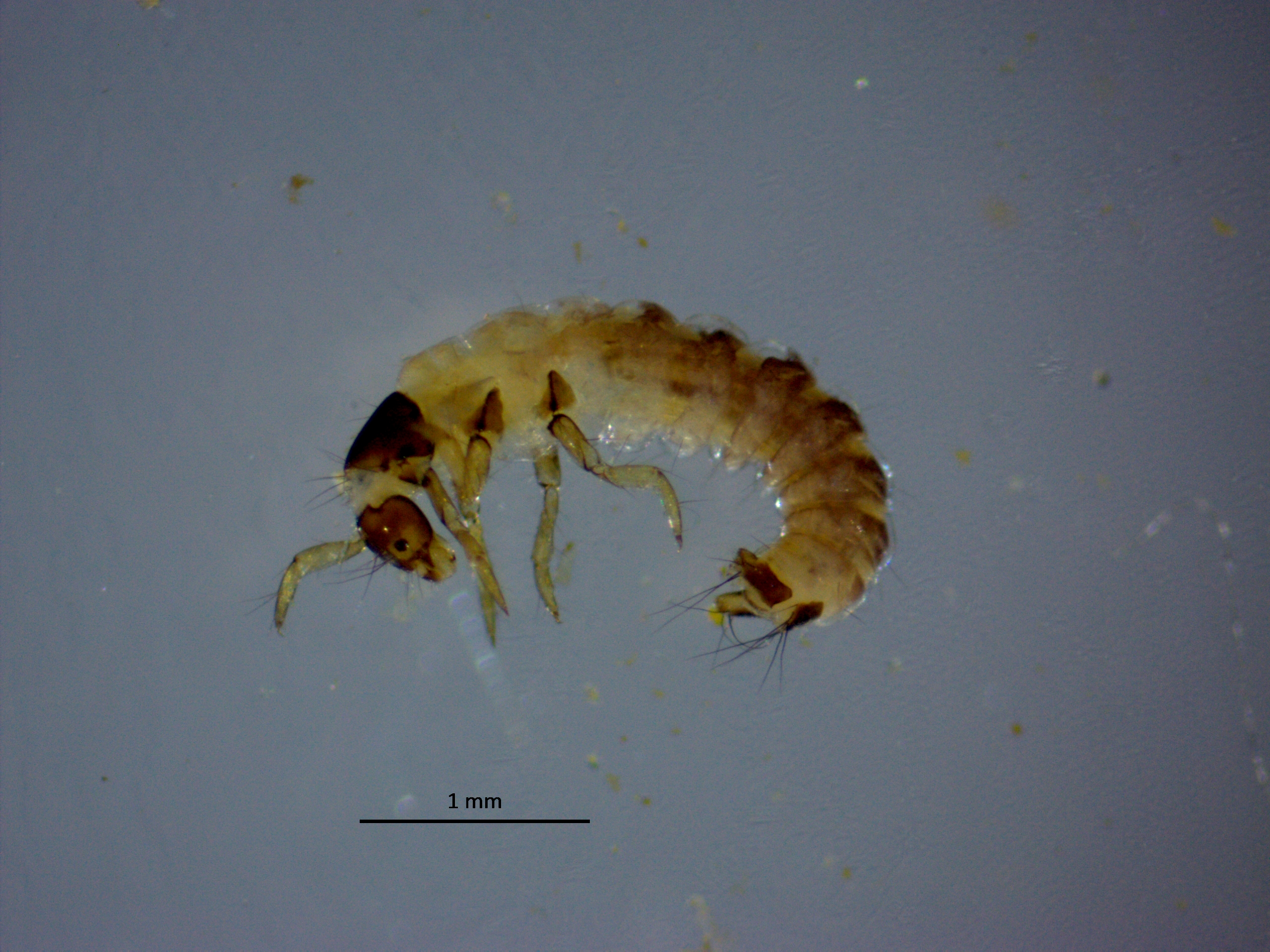

== See also ==
- List of Glossosoma species
