= Pseudaraeococcus montanus =

Scientific classification
- Kingdom: Plantae
- Clade: Tracheophytes
- Clade: Angiosperms
- Clade: Monocots
- Clade: Commelinids
- Order: Poales
- Family: Bromeliaceae
- Subfamily: Bromelioideae
- Genus: Pseudaraeococcus
- Species: P. montanus

Binomial name
- Pseudaraeococcus montanus (Leme) R.A.Pontes & Versieux

Synonyms
- Araeococcus montanus Leme

Species of flowering plant

Pseudaraeococcus montanus is a species of flowering plant in the family Bromeliaceae, endemic to Brazil (the state of Bahia). It was first described in 1999 as Araeococcus montanus.
