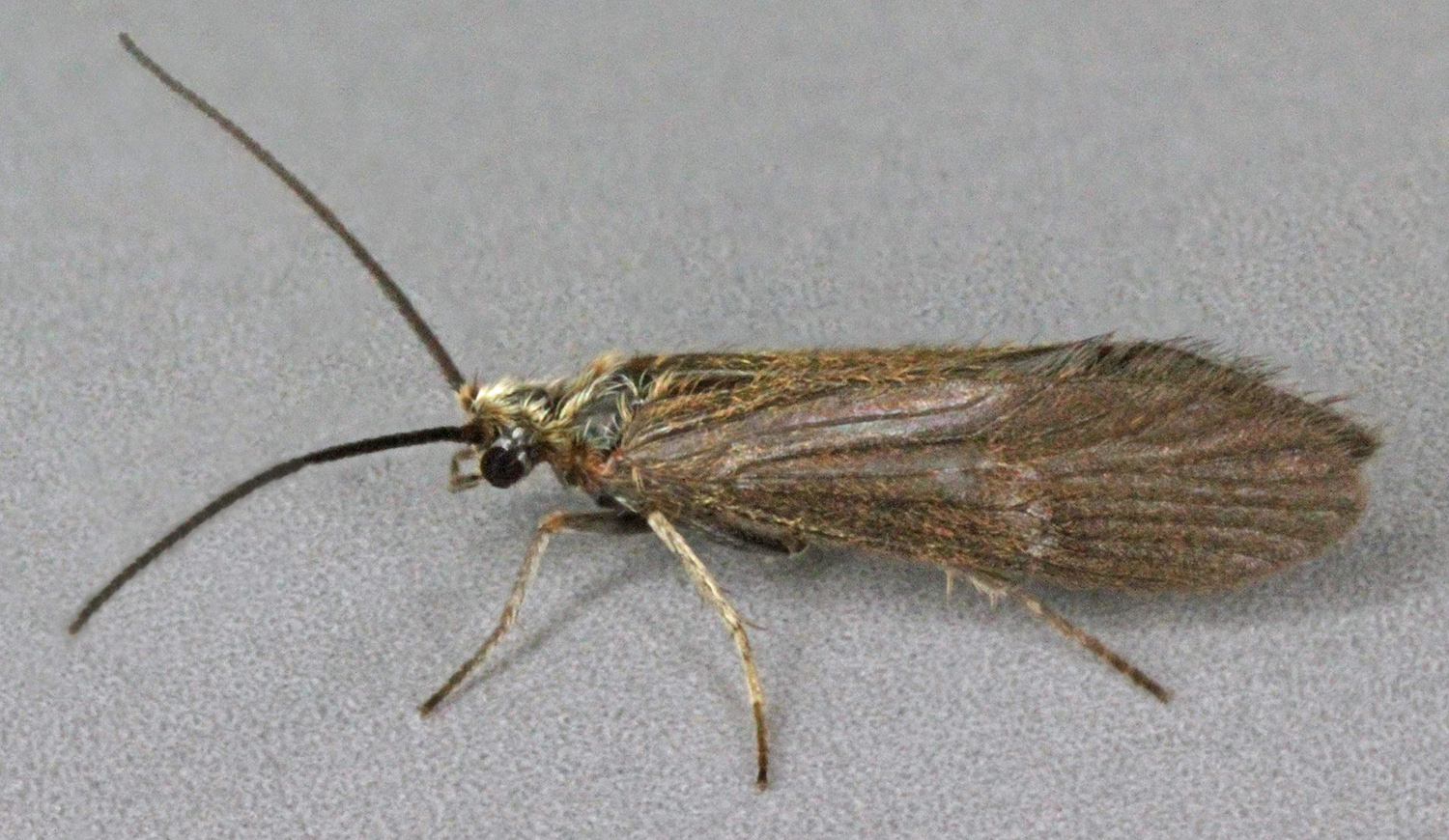
- Agapetus fuscipes

Scientific classification
- Kingdom: Animalia
- Phylum: Arthropoda
- Clade: Pancrustacea
- Class: Insecta
- Order: Trichoptera
- Family: Glossosomatidae
- Genus: Agapetus; Curtis, 1834

Diversity
- at least 210 species

= Agapetus (caddisfly) =

Genus of caddisflies

Agapetus is a genus of little black caddisflies of the family Glossosomatidae. There are at least 210 described species in Agapetus.

Larvae of Agapetus could be confused with Protoptila (another Glossosomatidae), but are readily distinguished by the presence of 2 mesonotal sclerites instead of 3. There have been few larval-adult associations of the Agapetus spp. (7 of 30), so in areas with multiple species, adults or mature pupae are needed for species level identification. The saddle-type rock cases for larval Agapetus usually have larger rocks along the edge of the case.

The type species for Agapetus is Agapetus fuscipes J. Curtis.

== See also ==
- List of Agapetus species
