= Glossosomatidae =

Scientific classification
- Kingdom: Animalia
- Phylum: Arthropoda
- Clade: Pancrustacea
- Class: Insecta
- Order: Trichoptera
- Superfamily: Glossosomatoidea
- Family: Glossosomatidae; Wallengren, 1891

Subfamilies and genera
- Agapetinae: Agapetus; Catagapetus; Electragapetus; Glossosomatinae: Anagapetus; Glossosoma; Protoptilinae: Campsiophora; Canoptila; Cariboptila; Cubanoptila; Culoptila; Itauara; Mastigoptila; Matrioptila; Merionoptila; Mexitrichia; Mortoniella; Nepaloptila; Padunia; Poeciloptila; Protoptila; Scotiotrichia; Temburongpsyche; Tolhuaca

Family of caddisflies

The Glossosomatidae are a family of the class Insecta and order Trichoptera.The family contains 23 genera in three subfamilies. In the US alone, there are 76 spp. in 6 different genera.

Glossosomatids, commonly known as the tortoise or saddle-case makers, and are worldwide in distribution. The common names were derived from the domed shaped cases created by the larvae. The first species was described by John Curtis in 1843, but the family wasn't created until 1891 by HDJ Wallengren.

== Morphology ==
Larvae: Glossosomatid larvae have membranous meso- and metanotums (or if they do have sclerites, never more than half of the notum). They do not possess a prosternal horn. Their 9th abdominal segment has a sclerite. In addition, Glossosomatids tend to have short anal prolegs complete with accessory hooks.

Adults: Glossosomatid adults tend to be small to medium sized with long antennae, short fringed wings, and long palps. On their mesothorax, two round, hairy mesoscutellar warts, parallel to one another, can be found. Adults have 3 ocelli upon their head. Their maxillary palps are 5-segmented with the 2nd segment rounded, and as long as the 1st segment. Preapical spurs are not found on their fore tibia. Lastly, Glossosomatid adult have widely spaced mesal setose warts on their prothorax.

== Biology ==
Glossosomatid larvae, unlike other related families within Spicipalpia, build cases during the larva's first instar and each time the larva outgrows the case. Cases are formed from large and small pebbles found within streams; these pebbles are spliced together with pieces of silk created by the larva. The case is formed loosely so as to allow water, and dissolved oxygen, to flow freely into the case for larval respiration. There are a couple of reasons why larvae produce cases:

1. Physical protection from predators
2. Camouflage
3. Water resistance

Larvae are usually found in fast flowing, cool mountain springs. Cool springs have a higher dissolved oxygen concentration than warmer springs. Glossosomatid larvae do not normally have gills, meaning that they respire through their cuticle. A higher dissolved oxygen concentration on the outside of the larvae allow more oxygen to be utilized by the larva. Fast flowing streams, on the other hand, allow more water to pass over the cuticle of the larva, again resulting in the larva utilizing more dissolved oxygen. Within streams, Glossosomatid larvae can be found clinging to submerged logs and rocks with algae present. They scrap, graze, and consume algae, in addition to other fine particulate matter. A normal larva can live months to years within a single streams (because the cold conditions increase longevity) before pupating.

Larvae chew off the silk on the ventral part of the case and fasten it, using silk, to a rock when ready to pupate. Inside of the case, the larva will spin a brown, silken cocoon where it will pupate. This life stage last for about month, unless they are in diapause. The pupae are exarate and decticous, this means that the pupa are capable of using their mandibles. Chewing the silk holding the case to the rock, the pupa will then float to the surface. Inside is a pharate (young, unsclerotized) adult that will emerge and undergo sclerotization.

Adults normally do not feed, but some species are known to feed on nectar. They can be found flying around at night, because they are nocturnal, and can be caught using light traps. Otherwise, adults can be found during the day inside of vegetation where they remain quiescent until night. After mating, eggs are laid in a gelatinous mass under rocks, on the water surface, or on floating objects in a stream. This gelatinous mass helps to protect the eggs by ensuring they do not desiccate.

== Phylogeny ==
There is much debate over the placement of suborders within Trichoptera, the formation of the family Ryacophiloidea, as well as the relationship between the families within Ryacophiloidea. Some suggest that Spicipalpia should be integrated into Integripalpia. Current research into the phylogeny of Trichoptera suggest that Spicipalpia is weakly monophyletic when using certain genetic and morphological characters, and is possibly paraphyletic.

== Economic importance ==
For the most part, Glossosomatids are not incredibly important to the economy. They are mostly used as bait for fishermen, but their more important use requires their significance as bioindicators.

Glossomatids are incredibly susceptible to water pollution both at the family-level as well as at the genus-level. Water pollution includes streams with excess algae growth, high concentration of minerals, chemical runoff, etc. Glossosomatids are excellent bioindicators of pollution because of their longevity (they experience water conditions for months to years), their susceptibility, and the ease of their identification.
