= Oedichirus =

Scientific classification
- Kingdom: Animalia
- Phylum: Arthropoda
- Clade: Pancrustacea
- Class: Insecta
- Order: Coleoptera
- Suborder: Polyphaga
- Infraorder: Staphyliniformia
- Family: Staphylinidae
- Subfamily: Paederinae
- Tribe: Pinophilini
- Genus: Oedichirus; Erichson, 1839

Synonyms
- Oedichiranus Reitter, 1906; Oedichirus (Oedichiranus) Reitter, 1906; Elytrobaeus Sahlberg, R. F., 1847

Genus of beetles

Oedichirus is a genus of beetles belonging to the family Staphylinidae.

== Species ==
- Oedichirus abbreviatus Assing, 2014
- Oedichirus abdominalis Boheman, 1848
- Oedichirus abyssinicus Fagel, 1971
- Oedichirus aethiopopygus Fagel, 1955
- Oedichirus alatus Nietner, 1856
- Oedichirus alnewtoni Rougemont, 2019
- Oedichirus altitudinis Rougemont, 2018
- Oedichirus amoamontis Rougemont, 2018
- Oedichirus ampamoho Janák, 1996
- Oedichirus analis Lecoq, 1986
- Oedichirus andapanus Lecoq, 1986
- Oedichirus andersoni Blackburn, 1888
- Oedichirus andringitra Janák, 2003
- Oedichirus andringitranus Jarrige, 1978
- Oedichirus angavokeliensis Lecoq, 1986
- Oedichirus angolensis Fagel, 1971
- Oedichirus angusticeps Rougemont, 2018
- Oedichirus anosibensis Lecoq, 1990
- Oedichirus anosyanus Lecoq, 1986
- Oedichirus antitra Janák, 1996
- Oedichirus anularis Lecoq, 1986
- Oedichirus apiculus Herman, 2013
- Oedichirus appendiculatus Lecoq, 1986
- Oedichirus arrowi Bernhauer, 1934
- Oedichirus aruensis Rougemont, 2018
- Oedichirus astoni Rougemont, 2017
- Oedichirus bacillus Fagel, 1955
- Oedichirus balarombe Janák, 1998
- Oedichirus balazuci Lecoq, 1986
- Oedichirus balnearius Rougemont, 2018
- Oedichirus baloghi Last, 1980
- Oedichirus bambusicola Fagel, 1971
- Oedichirus bara Janák, 2003
- Oedichirus barbertonensis Fagel, 1971
- Oedichirus basilewskyanus Fagel, 1971
- Oedichirus batillus Herman, 2013
- Oedichirus beltermanni Bernhauer, 1939
- Oedichirus bertiae Lecoq, 1986
- Oedichirus betschi Jarrige, 1978
- Oedichirus betsileo Janák, 1998
- Oedichirus bicolor Fagel, 1971
- Oedichirus bicristatus Herman, 2013
- Oedichirus bicuspidatus Assing, 2013
- Oedichirus bifidus Lecoq, 1986
- Oedichirus biguttatus Fauvel, 1897
- Oedichirus bilaminatus Rougemont, 2018
- Oedichirus birmanus Fauvel, 1895
- Oedichirus biroi Last, 1980
- Oedichirus blukwaensis Fagel, 1971
- Oedichirus boehmi Bernhauer, 1927
- Oedichirus bonibona Janák, 1998
- Oedichirus bonsae Jarrige, 1978
- Oedichirus bowringi Rougemont, 2018
- Oedichirus brachelytratus Lecoq, 1986
- Oedichirus brlensis Rougemont, 2018
- Oedichirus brunneicolor Fagel, 1971
- Oedichirus brunneus Wendeler, 1930
- Oedichirus bulirschi Janák, 2003
- Oedichirus bullaglaber Herman, 2013
- Oedichirus bullahirtus Herman, 2013
- Oedichirus burgeoni Bernhauer, 1934
- Oedichirus burwelli Rougemont, 2018
- Oedichirus cameronianus Fagel, 1971
- Oedichirus camerounensis Fagel, 1971
- Oedichirus capensis Fagel, 1971
- Oedichirus capicola Fagel, 1971
- Oedichirus carayoni Lecoq, 1986
- Oedichirus cardamomensis Rougemont, 2018
- Oedichirus carolinorum Janák, 1995
- Oedichirus caupo Rougemont, 2018
- Oedichirus cauvini Rougemont, 2018
- Oedichirus celisianus Fagel, 1971
- Oedichirus chapmani Cameron, 1940
- Oedichirus clavolateralis Herman, 2013
- Oedichirus clavulus Herman, 2013
- Oedichirus clementi Lecoq, 1986
- Oedichirus congoensis Bernhauer, 1927
- Oedichirus conspicuus Fagel, 1971
- Oedichirus cooki Rougemont, 2018
- Oedichirus coorgensis Rougemont, 2018
- Oedichirus crebrepunctatus Fagel, 1971
- Oedichirus cribricollis Lea, 1923
- Oedichirus cribripennis Lea, 1931
- Oedichirus cribriventer Lea, 1923
- Oedichirus crocodilus Rougemont, 2018
- Oedichirus cuccodoroi Rougemont, 2018
- Oedichirus curticornis Fagel, 1971
- Oedichirus curtipennis Fagel, 1971
- Oedichirus curtulus Lecoq, 1986
- Oedichirus damingensis Li, Wen-Rong, Nan-Nan Xie & Li-Zhen Li, 2015
- Oedichirus densoides Fagel, 1971
- Oedichirus densus Bernhauer, 1915
- Oedichirus denticulatus Lecoq, 1986
- Oedichirus depravatus Assing, 2013
- Oedichirus depressipennis Lecoq, 1986
- Oedichirus desaegerianus Fagel, 1971
- Oedichirus descarpentriesi Jarrige, 1978
- Oedichirus despointesi Rougemont, 2018
- Oedichirus didyanus Janák, 1996
- Oedichirus dilophus Herman, 2013
- Oedichirus distortus Herman, 2013
- Oedichirus dollmani Bernhauer, 1934
- Oedichirus dominicanensis Herman, 2013
- Oedichirus dubius Jarrige, 1978
- Oedichirus duflosi Lecoq, 1986
- Oedichirus dunayi Janák, 1996
- Oedichirus dzumacensis Rougemont, 2018
- Oedichirus echinatus Herman, 2013
- Oedichirus electrimontis Rougemont, 2018
- Oedichirus elgonensis Fagel, 1971
- Oedichirus endomanensis Rougemont, 2018
- Oedichirus ensifer Lecoq, 1986
- Oedichirus epiphyticola Janák, 2003
- Oedichirus eppelsheimianus Fagel, 1971
- Oedichirus ericeticola Fagel, 1971
- Oedichirus exilis Herman, 2013
- Oedichirus fageli Lecoq, 1986
- Oedichirus falcifer Rougemont, 2018
- Oedichirus fauvelianus Rougemont, 2018
- Oedichirus femoralis Lecoq, 1986
- Oedichirus filicornis Fagel, 1971
- Oedichirus fitorahana Janák, 2003
- Oedichirus flammeus Koch, C., 1939
- Oedichirus flavifrons Fagel, 1971
- Oedichirus flavipes Lecoq, 1986
- Oedichirus formosanus Rougemont, 2018
- Oedichirus fortepunctatus Fagel, 1971
- Oedichirus foveicollis Quedenfeldt, M., 1883
- Oedichirus franzi Lecoq, 1987
- Oedichirus furcatus Lecoq, 1986
- Oedichirus garambanus Fagel, 1971
- Oedichirus geniculatus (Sahlberg, R. F., 1847)
- Oedichirus georgesi Delaunay & Coache, 2023
- Oedichirus giachinoi Rougemont, 2018
- Oedichirus glabrihamus Herman, 2013
- Oedichirus gladiatus Lecoq, 1986
- Oedichirus gracilis Fagel, 1971
- Oedichirus grandis Bernhauer, 1920
- Oedichirus graskopensis Fagel, 1971
- Oedichirus griveaudi Lecoq, 1986
- Oedichirus grossepunctatus Rougemont, 2018
- Oedichirus guomindangi Rougemont, 2018
- Oedichirus hamatus Herman, 2013
- Oedichirus hammondi Lecoq, 1991
- Oedichirus hanglipbosensis Fagel, 1971
- Oedichirus haribe Janák, 1998
- Oedichirus hermani Rougemont, 2018
- Oedichirus hewitti Bernhauer, 1927
- Oedichirus histrio Lecoq, 1986
- Oedichirus hochimini Rougemont, 2018
- Oedichirus humansdorpensis Fagel, 1971
- Oedichirus humicola Fagel, 1971
- Oedichirus ianitrix Rougemont, 2018
- Oedichirus ingogoensis Fagel, 1971
- Oedichirus insolitus Fagel, 1971
- Oedichirus insularis Lecoq, 1986
- Oedichirus intermixtus Fagel, 1971
- Oedichirus intricatus Fauvel, 1877
- Oedichirus isthmus Herman, 2013
- Oedichirus itombwensis Fagel, 1971
- Oedichirus ivohibensis Jarrige, 1978
- Oedichirus ivoriensis Rougemont, 2018
- Oedichirus janae Janák, 1995
- Oedichirus jarrigei Lecoq, 1986
- Oedichirus javanicus Rougemont, 2018
- Oedichirus jenisi Janák, 1996
- Oedichirus jocquei Lecoq, 1996
- Oedichirus kaboboensis Fagel, 1971
- Oedichirus kahololoensis Fagel, 1971
- Oedichirus kahuziensis Fagel, 1971
- Oedichirus kalamba Janák, 2003
- Oedichirus kalehensis Fagel, 1971
- Oedichirus kanak Rougemont, 2018
- Oedichirus katanganus Fagel, 1971
- Oedichirus katbergensis Fagel, 1971
- Oedichirus keanus Fagel, 1971
- Oedichirus kidundaensis Fagel, 1971
- Oedichirus kilimanjarensis Fagel, 1971
- Oedichirus kimbiensis Fagel, 1971
- Oedichirus kirunguensis Fagel, 1971
- Oedichirus kiuchii Sawada, K., 1964
- Oedichirus kivuensis Fagel, 1971
- Oedichirus kochangensis Rougemont, 2018
- Oedichirus kolbei Fauvel, 1904
- Oedichirus kolwezienus Fagel, 1971
- Oedichirus kuroshio Hayashi, Y., 1989
- Oedichirus kyandolirensis Fagel, 1971
- Oedichirus lamotteanus Fagel, 1971
- Oedichirus lannaensis Rougemont, 2018
- Oedichirus laoticus Rougemont, 2018
- Oedichirus laperousei Rougemont, 2018
- Oedichirus latexciscus Assing, 2014
- Oedichirus laticeps Lecoq, 1986
- Oedichirus latipennis Bernhauer, 1934
- Oedichirus latus Rougemont, 2018
- Oedichirus lawrencei Rougemont, 2018
- Oedichirus lecoqi Janák, 1996
- Oedichirus leleupianus Fagel, 1971
- Oedichirus levasseuri Lecoq, 1986
- Oedichirus lewisius Sharp, 1874
- Oedichirus loebli Rougemont, 2018
- Oedichirus loksai Last, 1980
- Oedichirus longicornis Lecoq, 1986
- Oedichirus longipennis Kraatz, 1859
- Oedichirus longipilis Fagel, 1971
- Oedichirus luberensis Fagel, 1971
- Oedichirus lucabosmontis Rougemont, 2018
- Oedichirus lucidiceps Fagel, 1971
- Oedichirus lucidus Rougemont, 2018
- Oedichirus lugubris Fagel, 1955
- Oedichirus luikoensis Fagel, 1971
- Oedichirus lunatus Herman, 2013
- Oedichirus luvubuensis Fagel, 1971
- Oedichirus lwiroensis Fagel, 1971
- Oedichirus madagascariensis Bernhauer, 1927
- Oedichirus madegassus Fagel, 1971
- Oedichirus mafana Janák, 1998
- Oedichirus magnus Last, 1980
- Oedichirus mahanuvaraensis Rougemont, 2018
- Oedichirus mahasoa Janák, 1998
- Oedichirus mahnerti Rougemont, 2018
- Oedichirus maierae Rougemont, 2018
- Oedichirus malalaka Janák, 1996
- Oedichirus manarivo Janák, 1996
- Oedichirus manautei Rougemont, 2018
- Oedichirus mandibularis Lecoq, 1986
- Oedichirus mangabensis Lecoq, 1987
- Oedichirus mariepskopensis Fagel, 1971
- Oedichirus mavo Janák, 1996
- Oedichirus mediosiamensis Rougemont, 2018
- Oedichirus melanurus Eppelsheim, 1885
- Oedichirus meruensis Fagel, 1971
- Oedichirus microcephalus Fagel, 1971
- Oedichirus microphthalmus Fagel, 1971
- Oedichirus mimopilosus Rougemont, 2018
- Oedichirus minimus Bernhauer, 1927
- Oedichirus minor Cameron, 1914
- Oedichirus minutus Fagel, 1971
- Oedichirus misionesiensis Herman, 2013
- Oedichirus miskoi Janák, 1996
- Oedichirus mokotoensis Fagel, 1971
- Oedichirus moloensis Fagel, 1971
- Oedichirus montanus Last, 1980
- Oedichirus monteithi Rougemont, 2018
- Oedichirus monticola Fagel, 1971
- Oedichirus montishoyoensis Fagel, 1971
- Oedichirus moraveci Janák, 1998
- Oedichirus muluensis Rougemont, 2018
- Oedichirus muscicolus Rougemont, 2018
- Oedichirus muscorum Jarrige, 1970
- Oedichirus mutilus Rougemont, 2018
- Oedichirus mwengensis Fagel, 1971
- Oedichirus natalensis Fagel, 1971
- Oedichirus neotropicus Blackwelder, 1944
- Oedichirus nepalensis Rougemont, 2018
- Oedichirus newtonianus Fagel, 1971
- Oedichirus niger Cameron, 1914
- Oedichirus nigriceps Fagel, 1971
- Oedichirus nigrolineatus Lecoq, 1986
- Oedichirus nigropolitus Rougemont, 2018
- Oedichirus nimbaensis Fagel, 1971
- Oedichirus nitidiventris Fagel, 1971
- Oedichirus nodieri Lecoq, 1986
- Oedichirus nordicus Lecoq, 1987
- Oedichirus nosykombanus Lecoq, 1986
- Oedichirus novacaledonicus Rougemont, 2018
- Oedichirus novaeguineae Wendeler, 1926
- Oedichirus novahibernicus Rougemont, 2018
- Oedichirus novus Jarrige, 1978
- Oedichirus noyesi Lecoq, 1991
- Oedichirus nyakageraensis Fagel, 1971
- Oedichirus nyalengwensis Fagel, 1971
- Oedichirus obscuripes Fagel, 1971
- Oedichirus obscurus Fagel, 1971
- Oedichirus obsoletus Lecoq, 1986
- Oedichirus occipitopunctatus Lecoq, 1986
- Oedichirus oceanicus Rougemont, 2018
- Oedichirus oedypus (Rottenberg, 1870)
- Oedichirus ohausi Wendeler, 1930
- Oedichirus oldeaniensis Fagel, 1971
- Oedichirus omoanus Fagel, 1971
- Oedichirus oneili Péringuey, 1908
- Oedichirus opacus Lecoq, 1986
- Oedichirus optatus Sharp, 1876
- Oedichirus orophilus Fagel, 1971
- Oedichirus oundaensis Last, 1980
- Oedichirus paederinus Erichson, 1840
- Oedichirus paederoides MacLeay, W. J., 1871
- Oedichirus palawanensis Rougemont, 2018
- Oedichirus papanganus Lecoq, 1986
- Oedichirus papuanus Cameron, 1937
- Oedichirus pardoi Outerelo & Gamarra, 1989
- Oedichirus parviceps Fagel, 1971
- Oedichirus parvus Lecoq, 1986
- Oedichirus patcholatkoi Rougemont, 2018
- Oedichirus pauli Assing, 2019
- Oedichirus pauliani Lecoq, 1986
- Oedichirus pearceanus Fagel, 1971
- Oedichirus peckorum Rougemont, 2018
- Oedichirus pendleburyi Cameron, 1930
- Oedichirus pengzhongi Li, Wen-Rong, Nan-Nan Xie & Li-Zhen Li, 2015
- Oedichirus penicillatus Jarrige, 1978
- Oedichirus philippinus Rougemont, 2018
- Oedichirus pictipes Oke, 1933
- Oedichirus pietersburgensis Fagel, 1971
- Oedichirus pilosus Rougemont, 2018
- Oedichirus planiceps Rougemont, 2018
- Oedichirus problematicus Fagel, 1971
- Oedichirus procerus Herman, 2013
- Oedichirus profundepunctatus Fagel, 1971
- Oedichirus pteropophilus Rougemont, 2018
- Oedichirus pteroposaltis Rougemont, 2018
- Oedichirus pubescens Lecoq, 1986
- Oedichirus puguensis Bernhauer, 1915
- Oedichirus puicus Assing, 2019
- Oedichirus pumilus Lecoq, 1986
- Oedichirus puncticollis Fagel, 1971
- Oedichirus pusillus Rougemont, 2018
- Oedichirus pyricollis Lea, 1931
- Oedichirus radama Janák, 2003
- Oedichirus ranavalona Janák, 2003
- Oedichirus ranomafanus Janák, 1995
- Oedichirus reticulatus Fagel, 1971
- Oedichirus rhodesianus Bernhauer, 1934
- Oedichirus riedeli Rougemont, 2018
- Oedichirus ruandaensis Fagel, 1971
- Oedichirus rubricollis Fauvel, 1878
- Oedichirus rubronotatus Pic, 1903
- Oedichirus ruficeps Kraatz, 1859
- Oedichirus rufitarsis Fauvel, 1904
- Oedichirus rufotestaceus Bernhauer, 1902
- Oedichirus rufulus Rougemont, 2018
- Oedichirus rufus Fauvel, 1897
- Oedichirus rugegensis Fagel, 1971
- Oedichirus russipennis Assing, 2019
- Oedichirus ruteri Lecoq, 1986
- Oedichirus ruwenzoricus Fagel, 1971
- Oedichirus sambavanus Lecoq, 1986
- Oedichirus sanctamariae Lecoq, 1986
- Oedichirus satyrus Lecoq, 1986
- Oedichirus schubarti Irmler, 2015
- Oedichirus schuelkei Assing, 2014
- Oedichirus sedilloti Fauvel, 1889
- Oedichirus segmentarius Bernhauer, 1932
- Oedichirus segmentatus Rougemont, 2018
- Oedichirus semibrunneus Rougemont, 2018
- Oedichirus senegalensis (Laporte de Castelnau, 1835)
- Oedichirus serrulatus Lecoq, 1986
- Oedichirus shibatai Rougemont, 2018
- Oedichirus sihanouki Rougemont, 2018
- Oedichirus silvestris Lecoq, 1986
- Oedichirus similis Fagel, 1971
- Oedichirus simillimus Fagel, 1971
- Oedichirus simoni Eppelsheim, 1889
- Oedichirus simplex Lecoq, 1986
- Oedichirus sindicus Rougemont, 2018
- Oedichirus sinuosus Herman, 2013
- Oedichirus sodalis Rougemont, 2018
- Oedichirus sogai Jarrige, 1978
- Oedichirus sparsepunctatus Fagel, 1971
- Oedichirus sparsipennis Bernhauer, 1927
- Oedichirus sparsutus Fagel, 1971
- Oedichirus spectabilis Fagel, 1971
- Oedichirus speculifrons Bernhauer, 1939
- Oedichirus spelaeus Faille & Lecoq, 2018
- Oedichirus splendidus Lecoq, 1986
- Oedichirus stilicinus Gerstaecker, 1867
- Oedichirus strandi Bernhauer, 1937
- Oedichirus strictipennis Rougemont, 2018
- Oedichirus strictus Fagel, 1971
- Oedichirus subdensus Fagel, 1971
- Oedichirus summicola Fagel, 1971
- Oedichirus taghavianae Rougemont, 2018
- Oedichirus taitamontis Rougemont, 2018
- Oedichirus tempestivus Rougemont, 2018
- Oedichirus tenuis Fagel, 1971
- Oedichirus terminalis Lea, 1904
- Oedichirus terminatus Erichson, 1843
- Oedichirus testaceus Fagel, 1971
- Oedichirus theryi Rougemont, 2018
- Oedichirus tigrinus Lecoq, 1986
- Oedichirus tomaculiformis Rougemont, 2018
- Oedichirus torajah Rougemont, 2018
- Oedichirus transvaalensis Fagel, 1961
- Oedichirus triangulipennis Fagel, 1955
- Oedichirus tricolor Lea, 1904
- Oedichirus tronqueti Lecoq, 1986
- Oedichirus tshiaberimuensis Fagel, 1971
- Oedichirus tshuruyagaensis Fagel, 1971
- Oedichirus turneri Bernhauer, 1927
- Oedichirus uelensis Fagel, 1971
- Oedichirus uhligi Janák, 1996
- Oedichirus uluguruensis Fagel, 1971
- Oedichirus uncifer Rougemont, 2018
- Oedichirus uncinatus Lecoq, 1986
- Oedichirus unguesdraconis Rougemont, 2018
- Oedichirus unicolor Aubé, 1843
- Oedichirus unicus Fagel, 1971
- Oedichirus uniformis Fagel, 1971
- Oedichirus usambarae Bernhauer, 1937
- Oedichirus uviraensis Fagel, 1971
- Oedichirus vadoni Lecoq, 1986
- Oedichirus vaginalis Rougemont, 2018
- Oedichirus vaovao Janák, 1996
- Oedichirus variabilis Fagel, 1971
- Oedichirus variegatus Fagel, 1961
- Oedichirus variipennis Fagel, 1955
- Oedichirus varius Lecoq, 1986
- Oedichirus ventralis Fauvel, 1904
- Oedichirus vexans Rougemont, 2018
- Oedichirus viduasinae Rougemont, 2018
- Oedichirus villiersi Cameron, 1953
- Oedichirus vohitrosa Janák, 2003
- Oedichirus vulcanus Rougemont, 2018
- Oedichirus wallacei Rougemont, 2017
- Oedichirus witteanus Fagel, 1971
- Oedichirus woodbushensis Fagel, 1971
- Oedichirus yangambiensis Fagel, 1971
- Oedichirus zanzibaricus Fagel, 1971
- Oedichirus zealandicus Rougemont, 2018
- Oedichirus zumpti Bernhauer, 1939
