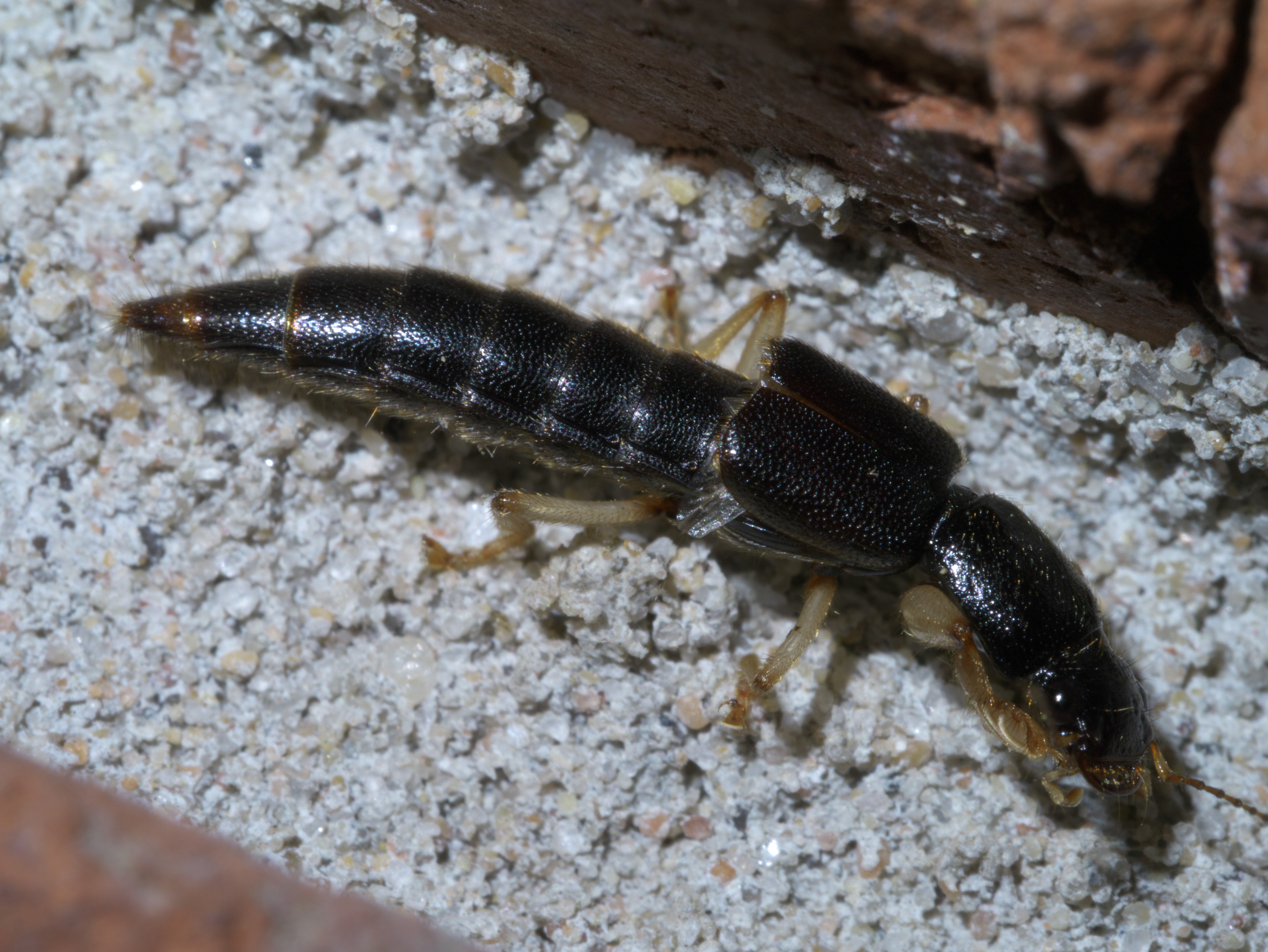

Scientific classification
- Kingdom: Animalia
- Phylum: Arthropoda
- Class: Insecta
- Order: Coleoptera
- Suborder: Polyphaga
- Infraorder: Staphyliniformia
- Family: Staphylinidae
- Tribe: Pinophilini
- Subtribe: Pinophilina
- Genus: Pinophilus; Gravenhorst, 1802

= Pinophilus =

Genus of beetles

Pinophilus is a genus of rove beetles in the family Staphylinidae.

== Species (list incomplete) ==
- Pinophilus cayennensis Laporte de Castelnau, 1835^{g}
- Pinophilus chinensis Bernhauer, 1938^{c g}
- Pinophilus femoratus Schubert, 1911^{c g}
- Pinophilus formosae Bernhauer, 1935^{c g}
- Pinophilus gracilis^{b}
- Pinophilus insigniventris Bernhauer, 1918^{g}
- Pinophilus javanus Erichson, 1840^{c g}
- Pinophilus latipes Gravenhorst, 1802^{b}
- Pinophilus lewisius Sharp, 1874^{c g}
- Pinophilus melanocephalus Motschulsky, 1858^{c g}
- Pinophilus parapunctatissimus Li & Chen, 1993^{c g}
- Pinophilus parcus^{b}
- Pinophilus punctatissimus Sharp, 1889^{c g}
- Pinophilus rufipennis Sharp, 1874^{c g}
- Pinophilus sachtlebeni Bernhauer, 1935^{c g}
- Pinophilus sautteri Bernhauer, 1935^{c g}
- Pinophilus tenuis Fagel, 1963^{g}

Data sources: i = ITIS, c = Catalogue of Life, g = GBIF, b = Bugguide.net
