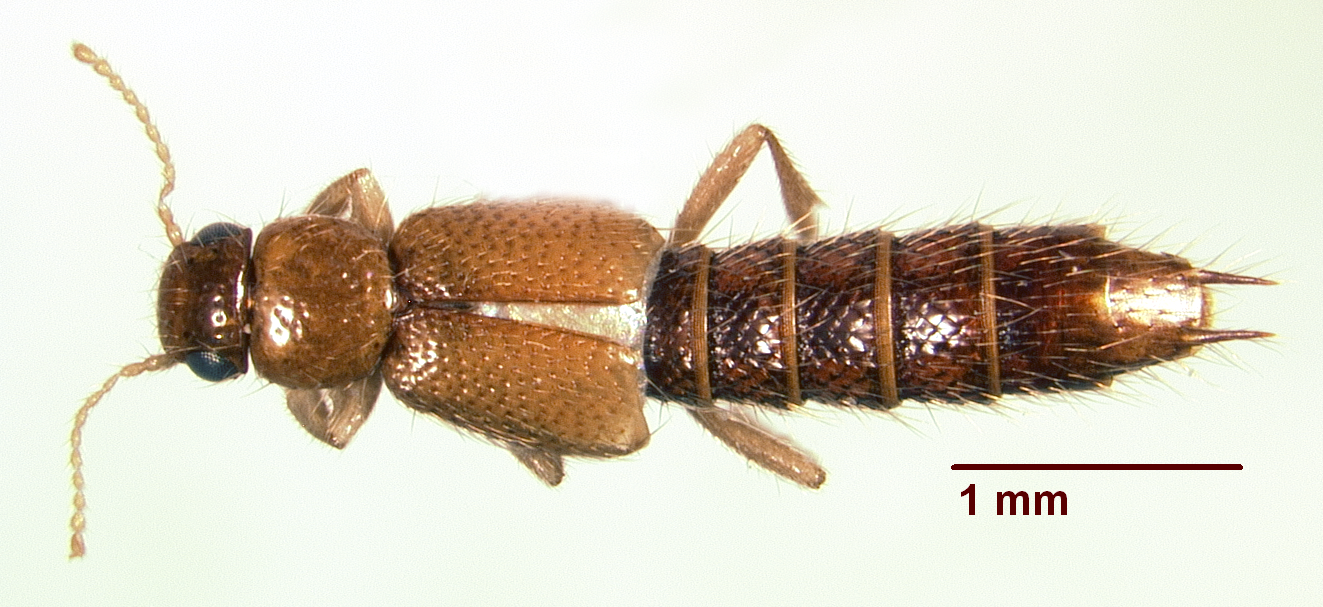
- Palaminus

Scientific classification
- Kingdom: Animalia
- Phylum: Arthropoda
- Clade: Pancrustacea
- Class: Insecta
- Order: Coleoptera
- Suborder: Polyphaga
- Infraorder: Staphyliniformia
- Family: Staphylinidae
- Subfamily: Paederinae
- Tribe: Pinophilini; Nordmann, 1837

= Pinophilini =

Pinophilini Temporal range: Cenomanian–Recent

Tribe of beetles

Pinophilini is a tribe of rove beetles in the family Staphylinidae.

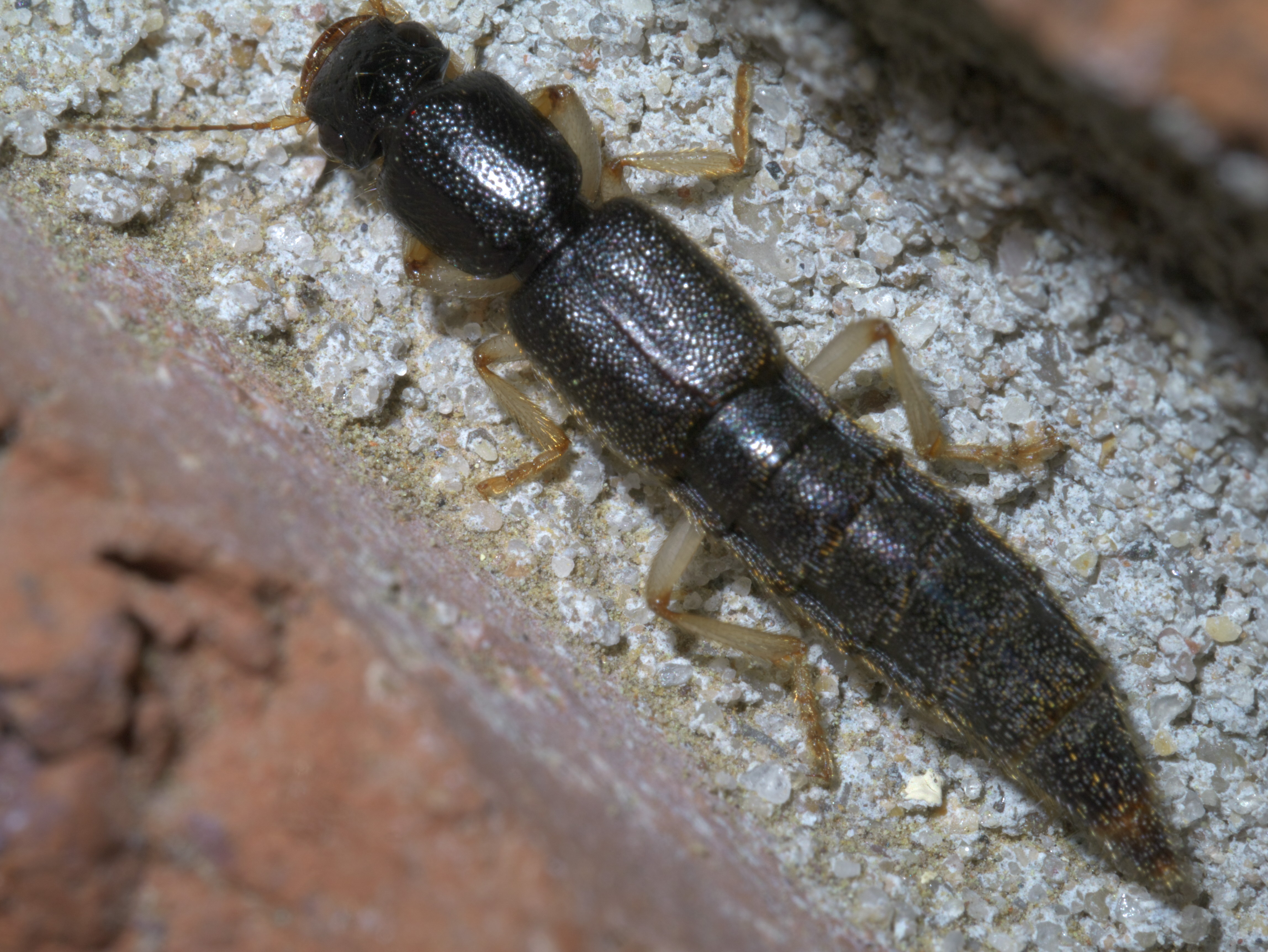
Pinophilus

== Genera ==
These genera belong to the tribe Pinophilini:

- Lathropinus Sharp, 1866^{g b}
- Mimopinophilus Coiffait, 1978^{g}
- Oedichirus Erichson, 1839^{c g}
- Palaminus Erichson, 1839^{c g b}
- Pinophilus Gravenhorst, 1802^{c g b}
- Procirrus Latreille, 1829^{c g}
- †Cretoprocirrus Shaw et al., 2020 Burmese amber, Myanmar, Cenomanian

Data sources: i = ITIS, c = Catalogue of Life, g = GBIF, b = Bugguide.net
