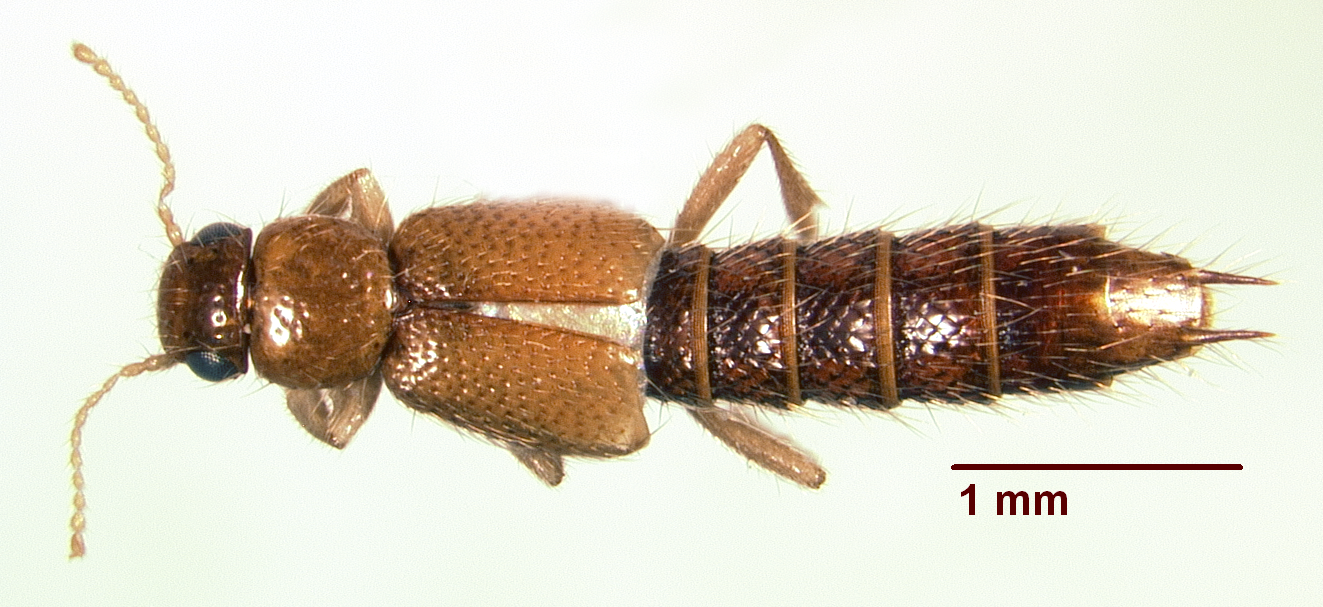

Scientific classification
- Kingdom: Animalia
- Phylum: Arthropoda
- Class: Insecta
- Order: Coleoptera
- Suborder: Polyphaga
- Infraorder: Staphyliniformia
- Family: Staphylinidae
- Tribe: Pinophilini
- Subtribe: Procirrina
- Genus: Palaminus; Erichson, 1839

= Palaminus =

Genus of beetles

Palaminus is a genus of rove beetles in the family Staphylinidae. There are about 16 described species in Palaminus.

== Species ==
These 16 species belong to the genus Palaminus:

- Palaminus aequalis Bernhauer, ms^{c}
- Palaminus apterus Bernhauer, 1918^{g}
- Palaminus dubius Notman, 1929^{g}
- Palaminus formosae Cameron, 1949^{c g}
- Palaminus formosanus Bernhauer, ms^{c}
- Palaminus hudsonicus Casey, 1910^{g}
- Palaminus iaponicus Cameron^{g}
- Palaminus insularis Cameron, 1913^{g}
- Palaminus japonicus Cameron, 1930^{c g}
- Palaminus larvalis^{b}
- Palaminus lumiventris Herman, 2003^{c g}
- Palaminus luteus Casey, 1910^{g}
- Palaminus montanus Cameron, 1947^{g}
- Palaminus parvus Cameron, 1918^{c g}
- Palaminus rufulus Coiffait, 1978^{c g}
- Palaminus variabilis Erichson, 1840^{g}

Data sources: i = ITIS, c = Catalogue of Life, g = GBIF, b = Bugguide.net
