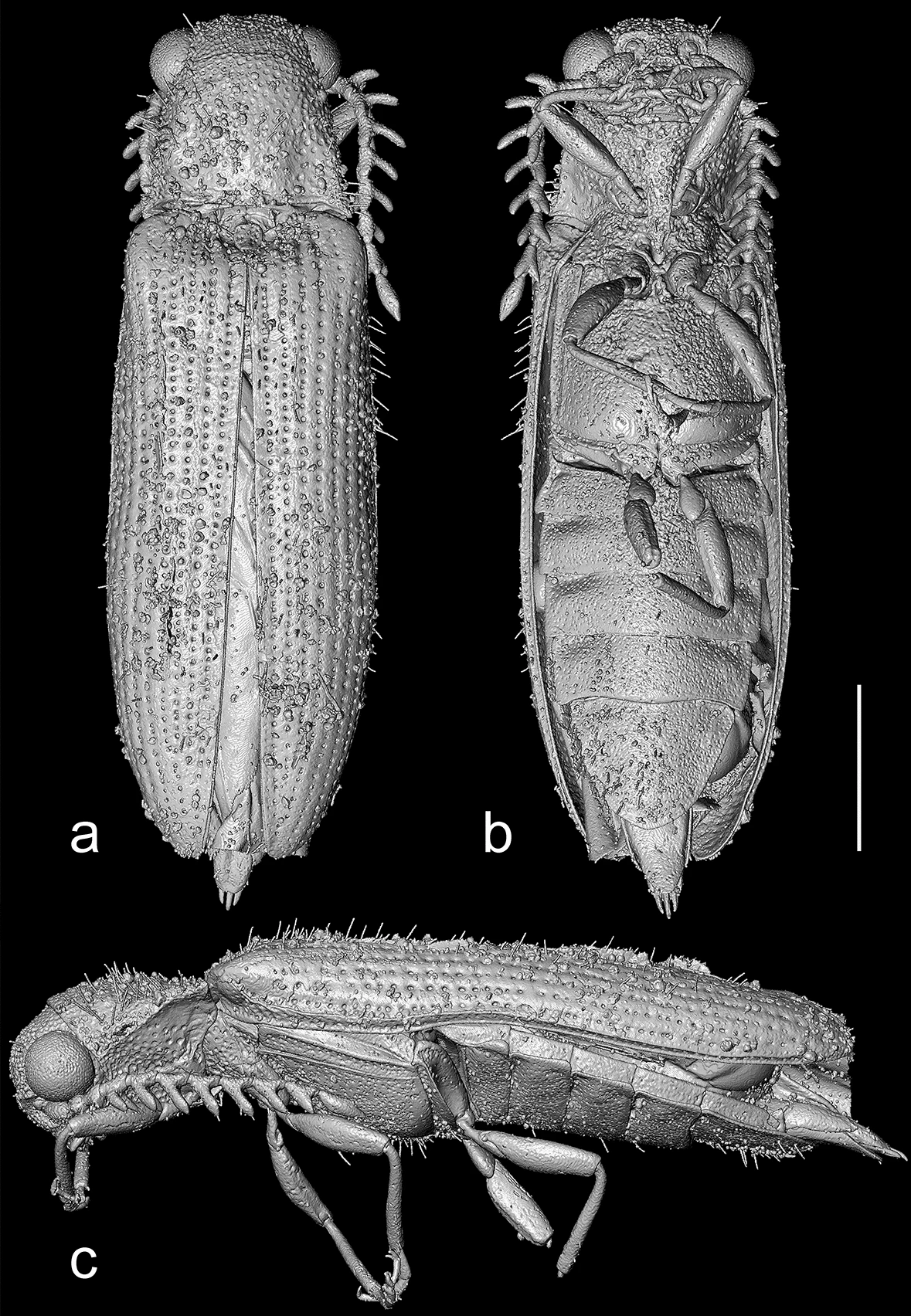

Scientific classification
- Kingdom: Animalia
- Phylum: Arthropoda
- Clade: Pancrustacea
- Class: Insecta
- Order: Coleoptera
- Suborder: Polyphaga
- Infraorder: Elateriformia
- Family: Elateridae
- Genus: †Baltelater; Kundrata et al., 2020

Type species
- Baltelater bipectinatus Kundrata et al., 2020

= Baltelater =

Baltelater Temporal range: Eocene

Extinct genus of beetles

Baltelater is an extinct genus of elaterid found in Baltic amber. Its type species is B. bipectinatus.
