= 2018 in paleoentomology =

2018 in paleoentomology is a list of new fossil insect taxa that were described during the year 2018, as well as other significant discoveries and events related to paleoentomology that occurred during the year.

== Newly named taxa ==
=== Coleopterans ===
Name	Novelty	Status	Authors	Age	Unit	Type Location	Notes	Images
Acalyptopygus	Gen. et 4 sp. nov	Valid	Clarke & Oberprieler in Clarke et al.	Late Cretaceous (Cenomanian)	Burmese amber	Myanmar	A weevil belonging to the family Mesophyletidae and the subfamily Aepyceratinae. The type species is A. brevicornis; genus also includes A. lingziae, A. elongatus and A. astriatus.	Acalyptopygus brevicornis
Allostrophus	Gen. et sp. nov	Valid	Hsiao et al.	Late Cretaceous (Cenomanian)	Burmese amber	Myanmar	A member of the family Tetratomidae. Genus includes new species A. cretaceus.	
Amberocula	Gen. et 3 sp. nov	Valid	Batelka, Engel & Prokop	Late Cretaceous (Cenomanian)	Burmese amber	Myanmar	A member of the family Ripiphoridae. The type species is A. muelleri; genus also includes A. costata and A. fallax.	
Amplectister	Gen. et sp. nov	Valid	Caterino & Maddison	Late Cretaceous (Cenomanian)	Burmese amber	Myanmar	A member of the family Histeridae. The type species is A. tenax.	Amplectister tenax
Aphelonyssus	Gen. et sp. nov	Valid	Clarke & Oberprieler in Clarke et al.	Late Cretaceous (Cenomanian)	Burmese amber	Myanmar	A weevil belonging to the family Mesophyletidae and the subfamily Mesophyletinae. The type species is A. latus.	
Apotomoura	Gen. et sp. nov	Valid	Bao et al.	Late Cretaceous (Cenomanian)	Burmese amber	Myanmar	A member of Tenebrionoidea belonging to the new family Apotomouridae. Genus includes new species A. fortiscrura.	
Archaeoheilus	Gen. et 2 sp. et 4 comb. nov	Valid	Legalov	Eocene	Green River Formation	United States	A weevil. The type species is A. scudderi genus also includes new species A. ovalis Also the moved species Hylobius deleticius (2015), Hylobius packardii (1893), Hylobius provectus (1876); Additionally includes Hylobius lacoei (1893) from the Florissant Formation.	
Ataenius damzeni	Sp. nov	Valid	Bukejs & Alekseev	Eocene	Baltic amber	Europe (Baltic Sea coast)	A species of Ataenius.	
Atomaria saxonica	Sp. nov	Valid	Lyubarsky & Perkovsky	Late Eocene	Bitterfeld amber	Germany	A species of Atomaria.	
Autosilis annisettaekoppelae	Sp. nov	Valid	Fanti & Damgaard	Eocene	Baltic amber	Russia (Kaliningrad Oblast)	A soldier beetle belonging to the subfamily Silinae.	
Baltocoeliodes	Gen. et sp. nov	Valid	Legalov & Bukejs	Eocene	Baltic amber	Russia (Kaliningrad Oblast)	A weevil belonging to the family Curculionidae and the tribe Ceutorhynchini. The type species is B. sontagae.	
Baltocyba	Gen. et sp. nov	Valid	Legalov	Eocene	Prussian Formation (Baltic amber)	Russia (Kaliningrad Oblast)	A member of the family Brentidae, the subfamily Apioninae and the tribe Rhadinocybini. The type species is B. electrinus.	
Baltonanophyes	Gen. et sp. nov	Valid	Legalov	Eocene	Prussian Formation (Baltic amber)	Russia (Kaliningrad Oblast)	A member of the family Brentidae, the subfamily Nanophyinae and the tribe Nanophyini. The type species is B. crassirostre.	
Baltostigus striatipennis	Sp. nov	Valid	Jałoszyński et al.	Late Eocene	Baltic amber	Europe (Baltic Sea coast)	A scydmaenine rove beetle belonging to the supertribe Mastigitae.	
Bowangius	Gen. et 4 sp. nov	Valid	Clarke & Oberprieler in Clarke et al.	Late Cretaceous (Cenomanian)	Burmese amber	Myanmar	A weevil belonging to the family Mesophyletidae and the subfamily Mesophyletinae. The type species is B. cyclops; genus also includes B. tanaops, B. zhenuai and B. glabratus.	
Burmalestes	Gen. et sp. nov	Valid	Tomaszewska & Ślipiński in Tomaszewska et al.	Late Cretaceous (Cenomanian)	Burmese amber	Myanmar	A member of the family Endomychidae. Genus includes new species B. albertalleni.	
Burmitoma	Gen. et sp. nov	Valid	Batelka, Engel & Prokop	Late Cretaceous (Cenomanian)	Burmese amber	Myanmar	A member of the family Ripiphoridae. The type species is B. nalae.	
Burmocorynus	Gen. et 2 sp. nov	Valid	Legalov	Late Cretaceous (Cenomanian)	Burmese amber	Myanmar	Originally described as a member of the family Belidae, but subsequently transferred to the weevil family Mesophyletidae and the subfamily Mesophyletinae. The type species is B. jarzembowskii Legalov (2018); genus also includes B. longus Clarke & Oberprieler in Clarke et al. (2018).	
Burmomacer	Gen. et sp. nov	Valid	Legalov	Late Cretaceous (Cenomanian)	Burmese amber	Myanmar	A member of the family Nemonychidae. The type species is B. kirejtshuki.	
Burmomiles	Gen. et sp. nov	Valid	Fanti, Damgaard & Ellenberger	Late Cretaceous (Cenomanian)	Burmese amber	Myanmar	A soldier beetle. Genus includes new species B. willerslevorum.	
Burmorhinus	Gen. et 2 sp. nov	Valid	Legalov	Late Cretaceous (Cenomanian)	Burmese amber	Myanmar	A weevil, originally assigned to the subfamily Erirhininae and the tribe Arthrostenini; subsequently transferred to the weevil family Mesophyletidae and the subfamily Mesophyletinae. Genus includes new species B. georgei Legalov (2018) and B. setosus Clarke & Oberprieler in Clarke et al. (2018).	
Cacomorphocerus bentifabrici	Sp. nov	Valid	Fanti & Damgaard	Eocene	Baltic amber	Russia (Kaliningrad Oblast)	A soldier beetle belonging to the subfamily Cantharinae.	
Cacomorphocerus madseni	Sp. nov	Valid	Fanti & Damgaard	Eocene	Baltic amber	Russia (Kaliningrad Oblast)	A soldier beetle belonging to the subfamily Cantharinae.	
Cacomorphocerus wiszniewskii	Sp. nov	Valid	Fanti & Kupryjanowicz	Eocene	Baltic amber	Europe (Baltic Sea coast)	A soldier beetle.	
Calyptocis	Gen. et sp. nov	Valid	Clarke & Oberprieler in Clarke et al.	Late Cretaceous (Cenomanian)	Burmese amber	Myanmar	A weevil belonging to the family Mesophyletidae and the subfamily Aepyceratinae. The type species is C. brevirostris.	Calyptocis brevirostris
Cantharis hanswerneri	Sp. nov	Valid	Kazantsev	Eocene	Baltic amber	Europe (Baltic region)	A species of Cantharis.	
Cantharis hoffeinsorum	Sp. nov	Valid	Kazantsev	Eocene	Baltic amber	Europe (Baltic region)	A species of Cantharis.	
Cantharis mikkelsenorum	Sp. nov	Valid	Fanti & Damgaard	Eocene	Baltic amber	Russia (Kaliningrad Oblast)	A species of Cantharis.	
Cascomastigus minor	Sp. nov	Valid	Yin, Cai & Huang	Late Cretaceous (Cenomanian)	Burmese amber	Myanmar	A rove beetle belonging to the subfamily Scydmaeninae.	
Cetionyx	Gen. et 3 sp. nov	Valid	Clarke & Oberprieler in Clarke et al.	Late Cretaceous (Cenomanian)	Burmese amber	Myanmar	A weevil belonging to the family Mesophyletidae and the subfamily Mesophyletinae. The type species is C. batiatus; genus also includes C. terebrans and C. ursinus.	
Colon burmiticum	Sp. nov	Valid	Yamamoto in Yamamoto & Takahashi	Late Cretaceous (Cenomanian)	Burmese amber	Myanmar	A member of the family Leiodidae belonging to the subfamily Coloninae.	
Compsopsarus	Gen. et sp. nov	Valid	Clarke & Oberprieler in Clarke et al.	Late Cretaceous (Cenomanian)	Burmese amber	Myanmar	A weevil belonging to the family Mesophyletidae and the subfamily Mesophyletinae. The type species is C. reneae.	
Cretaparamecus	Gen. et sp. nov	Valid	Tomaszewska, Ślipiński, Bai & Zhang in Tomaszewska et al.	Late Cretaceous (Cenomanian)	Burmese amber	Myanmar	A member of the family Endomychidae. Genus includes new species C. tarsalis.	
Cretohister	Gen. et sp. nov	Valid	Zhou et al.	Early Cretaceous	Yixian Formation	China	A member of Histeroidea belonging to the new family Cretohisteridae. Genus includes new species C. sinensis.	
Cretohypsilara	Gen. et sp. nov	Valid	Cai, Maier & Huang	Late Cretaceous (Cenomanian)	Burmese amber	Myanmar	A riffle beetle. Genus includes new species C. parva.	
Cretolestes	Gen. et sp. nov	Valid	Tomaszewska, Ślipiński & Ren in Tomaszewska et al.	Late Cretaceous (Cenomanian)	Burmese amber	Myanmar	A member of the family Endomychidae. Genus includes new species C. niger.	
Cretoparacucujus	Gen. et sp. nov	Valid	Cai & Escalona in Cai et al.	Late Cretaceous (Cenomanian)	Burmese amber	Myanmar	A member of the family Boganiidae belonging to the subfamily Paracucujinae. The type species is C. cycadophilus.	
Cretozenodosus	Gen. et sp. nov	Valid	Cai & Huang	Late Cretaceous (Cenomanian)	Burmese amber	Myanmar	A member of Cleroidea belonging to the family Thanerocleridae and the subfamily Zenodosinae. Genus includes new species C. fossilis.	
?Cryptarcha subglobosa	Sp. nov	Valid	Kirejtshuk & Nel	Paleocene		France	Possibly a species of Cryptarcha.	
Cyclaxyra cretacea	Sp. nov	Valid	Wu, Li & Ding	Late Cretaceous (Cenomanian)	Burmese amber	Myanmar	A member of Cucujoidea belonging to the family Cyclaxyridae. Originally described as a species of Cyclaxyra; Gimmel et al. (2019) made it the type species of a separate genus Electroxyra.	
Cyrtocis	Gen. et sp. nov	Valid	Clarke & Oberprieler in Clarke et al.	Late Cretaceous (Cenomanian)	Burmese amber	Myanmar	A weevil belonging to the family Mesophyletidae and the subfamily Mesophyletinae. The type species is C. gibbus.	
Debbia	Gen. et sp. nov	Valid	Clarke & Oberprieler in Clarke et al.	Late Cretaceous (Cenomanian)	Burmese amber	Myanmar	A weevil belonging to the family Mesophyletidae and the subfamily Mesophyletinae. The type species is D. gracilirostris.	
Dignomus francescovitalii	Sp. nov	Valid	Bukejs, Bellés & Alekseev	Eocene	Baltic amber	Europe (Baltic Sea region)	A spider beetle.	
Dinoharpalus martynovi	Sp. nov	Valid	Ponomarenko	Late Permian	Komarity Beds of the Salaraevo Formation	Russia	A member of the family Permosynidae.	
Dysanabatium aenaum	Sp. nov	Valid	Bogri, Solodovnikov & Żyła	Eocene	Baltic amber	Denmark	A rove beetle belonging to the subfamily Paederinae.	
Dysanabatium damgaardi	Sp. nov	Valid	Bogri, Solodovnikov & Żyła	Eocene	Baltic amber	Russia (Kaliningrad Oblast)	A rove beetle belonging to the subfamily Paederinae.	
Dysanabatium johannesi	Sp. nov	Valid	Bogri, Solodovnikov & Żyła	Eocene	Baltic amber	Russia (Kaliningrad Oblast)	A rove beetle belonging to the subfamily Paederinae.	
Dysanabatium kechrimparense	Sp. nov	Valid	Bogri, Solodovnikov & Żyła	Eocene	Baltic amber	Denmark; Poland; Russia; Ukraine	A rove beetle belonging to the subfamily Paederinae.	
Echogomphus	Gen. et sp. nov	Valid	Clarke & Oberprieler in Clarke et al.	Late Cretaceous (Cenomanian)	Burmese amber	Myanmar	A weevil belonging to the family Mesophyletidae and the subfamily Mesophyletinae. The type species is E. viridescens.	
Eduardoxenus	Gen. et sp. nov	Valid	Legalov, Nazarenko & Perkovsky	Late Eocene	Rovno amber	Ukraine	A member of the family Anthribidae belonging to the subfamily Choraginae and the tribe Valenfriesiini. The type species is E. unicus.	
Electrocis	Gen. et sp. nov	Valid	Clarke & Oberprieler in Clarke et al.	Late Cretaceous (Cenomanian)	Burmese amber	Myanmar	A weevil belonging to the family Mesophyletidae and the subfamily Mesophyletinae. The type species is E. dentitibialis.	
Electrorubesopsis	Gen. et sp. nov	Valid	Bai & Wang in Li et al.	Late Cretaceous (Cenomanian)	Burmese amber	Myanmar	A member of the family Scarabaeidae. Genus includes new species E. beuteli.	
Elwoodius	Gen. et sp. nov	Junior homonym	Clarke & Oberprieler in Clarke et al.	Late Cretaceous (Cenomanian)	Burmese amber	Myanmar	A weevil belonging to the family Mesophyletidae and the subfamily Mesophyletinae. The type species is E. conicops. The generic name is preoccupied by Elwoodius Colonnelli (2014); Clarke & Oberprieler (2019) coined a replacement name Zimmiorhinus.	
Erichia cretacea	Sp. nov	Valid	Yu et al.	Late Cretaceous (Cenomanian)	Burmese amber	Myanmar	A member of the family Limnichidae.	
Eridanula	Gen. et sp. nov	Valid	Fanti & Damgaard	Eocene	Baltic amber	Russia (Kaliningrad Oblast)	A soldier beetle belonging to the subfamily Cantharinae. The type species is E. susannaebierae.	
Eudiagogus vossi	Sp. nov	Valid	Legalov	Eocene	Green River Formation	United States	A weevil, a species of Eudiagogus.	
Euroleptochromus setifer	Sp. nov	Valid	Jałoszyński et al.	Late Eocene	Baltic amber	Europe (Baltic Sea coast)	A scydmaenine rove beetle belonging to the supertribe Mastigitae.	
Euroleptochromus tuberculatus	Sp. nov	Valid	Yin & Cai	Eocene	Baltic amber	Europe (Baltic Sea region)	A scydmaenine rove beetle belonging to the supertribe Mastigitae.	
Euryepomus	Gen. et sp. nov	Valid	Clarke & Oberprieler in Clarke et al.	Late Cretaceous (Cenomanian)	Burmese amber	Myanmar	A weevil belonging to the family Mesophyletidae and the subfamily Mesophyletinae. The type species is E. lophomerus.	
Extinctocentrinus	Gen. et sp. nov	Valid	Legalov	Eocene	Green River Formation	United States; Colorado	An Eudiagogini tribe entimine Curculionidae weevil. The type species is E. brevirostris.	
Frankencupes	Gen. et sp. nov	Valid	Ponomarenko & Bashkuev	Middle Triassic (Anisian)	Röt Formation	Germany	A member of Archostemata belonging to the family Permocupedidae. Genus includes new species F. ultimus.	
Furcalabratum	Gen. et sp. nov	Valid	Poinar & Brown	Late Cretaceous (Cenomanian)	Burmese amber	Myanmar	Originally described as a member of the family Kateretidae; subsequently argued to be a sap beetle belonging to the subfamily Apophisandrinae or a member of the separate family Apophisandridae. Genus includes new species F. burmanicum.	
Geraeus anvilis	Sp. nov	Valid	Legalov	Eocene	Green River Formation	United States; Colorado	A species of Geraeus.	
Geraeus fossilis	Sp. nov	Valid	Legalov	Eocene	Green River Formation	United States	A species of Geraeus.	
Giltine	Gen. et sp. nov	Valid	Alekseev & Tomaszewska	Late Eocene	Baltic amber	Russia (Kaliningrad Oblast)	A member of Coccinelloidea belonging to the family Anamorphidae. The type species is G. ampeensis.	
Glaresis burmitica	Sp. nov	Valid	Cai & Huang	Late Cretaceous (Cenomanian)	Burmese amber	Myanmar	A species of Glaresis.	
Globicornis groehni	Sp. nov	Valid	Bukejs & Háva	Eocene	Baltic amber	Europe (Baltic Sea region)	A species of Globicornis.	
Gnomus	Gen. et 2 sp. nov	Valid	Clarke & Oberprieler in Clarke et al.	Late Cretaceous (Cenomanian)	Burmese amber	Myanmar	A weevil belonging to the family Mesophyletidae and the subfamily Mesophyletinae. The type species is G. brevis; genus also includes G. spinipes.	
Gollandia	Gen. et sp. nov	Valid	Makranczy, Yamamoto & Engel	Late Cretaceous (Cenomanian)	Burmese amber	Myanmar	A rove beetle belonging to the subfamily Oxytelinae, tentatively placed in the tribe Coprophilini. The type species is G. planata.	
Gonodera baygushevae	Sp. nov	Valid	Nabozhenko & Chigray	Eocene	Baltic amber	Europe (Baltic Sea region)	A darkling beetle belonging to the subfamily Alleculinae.	
Gramboale	Gen. et sp. nov	Valid	Alekseev & Tomaszewska	Late Eocene	Baltic amber	Russia (Kaliningrad Oblast)	A member of Coccinelloidea belonging to the family Anamorphidae. The type species is G. prutenorum.	
Guillermorhinus	Gen. et sp. nov	Valid	Clarke & Oberprieler in Clarke et al.	Late Cretaceous (Cenomanian)	Burmese amber	Myanmar	A weevil belonging to the family Nemonychidae and the subfamily Rhinorhynchinae. The type species is G. longitarsis.	Guillermorhinus longitarsis
Habropezus kimpulleni	Sp. nov	Valid	Clarke & Oberprieler in Clarke et al.	Late Cretaceous (Cenomanian)	Burmese amber	Myanmar	A weevil belonging to the family Mesophyletidae and the subfamily Mesophyletinae.	
Habropezus ncoxatirostris	Sp. nov	Valid	Clarke & Oberprieler in Clarke et al.	Late Cretaceous (Cenomanian)	Burmese amber	Myanmar	A weevil belonging to the family Mesophyletidae and the subfamily Mesophyletinae.	
Habropezus tenuicornis	Sp. nov	Valid	Clarke & Oberprieler in Clarke et al.	Late Cretaceous (Cenomanian)	Burmese amber	Myanmar	A weevil belonging to the family Mesophyletidae and the subfamily Mesophyletinae.	
Hukawngichthyurus	Gen. et sp. nov	Valid	Fanti & Ellenberger	Late Cretaceous (Cenomanian)	Burmese amber	Myanmar	A soldier beetle. Genus includes new species H. kyawkhaingwini.	
Hukawngius	Gen. et sp. nov	Valid	Clarke & Oberprieler in Clarke et al.	Late Cretaceous (Cenomanian)	Burmese amber	Myanmar	A weevil belonging to the family Mesophyletidae and the subfamily Mesophyletinae. The type species is H. crassipes.	
Hydrobiites permianus	Sp. nov	Valid	Ponomarenko	Late Permian	Komarity Beds of the Salaraevo Formation	Russia	A member of the family Permosynidae.	
Hymenorus campbelli	Nom. nov	Valid	Bouchard in Bousquet et al.	Miocene	Dominican amber	Dominican Republic	A darkling beetle; replacement name for Hymenorus oculatus Doyen & Poinar (1994).	
Juratelacrima	Gen. et sp. nov	Valid	Fanti & Damgaard	Eocene	Baltic amber	Russia (Kaliningrad Oblast)	A soldier beetle belonging to the subfamily Cantharinae. The type species is J. ballingi.	
Kekveus	Gen. et sp. nov	Valid	Yamamoto, Grebennikov & Takahashi	Late Cretaceous (Cenomanian)	Burmese amber	Myanmar	A member of the family Ptiliidae. Genus includes new species K. jason.	
Kleinzaches	Gen. et sp. nov	Valid	Alekseev & Tomaszewska	Late Eocene	Bitterfeld amber	Germany	A member of Coccinelloidea belonging to the family Anamorphidae. The type species is K. germanicianus.	
Klesovia	Gen. et sp. nov	Valid	Petrov & Perkovsky	Eocene	Rovno amber	Ukraine	A bark beetle. Genus includes new species K. pubescens.	
Kuafu	Gen. et sp. nov	Valid	Yin et al.	Late Cretaceous (Cenomanian)	Burmese amber	Myanmar	An ant-like stone beetle belonging to the stem group of the tribe Scydmaenini. Genus includes new species K. borealis.	
Kuskaella bajerae	Sp. nov	Valid	Fanti & Damgaard	Eocene	Baltic amber	Russia (Kaliningrad Oblast)	A soldier beetle belonging to the subfamily Malthininae.	
Leptopezus	Gen. et 2 sp. nov	Valid	Clarke & Oberprieler in Clarke et al.	Late Cretaceous (Cenomanian)	Burmese amber	Myanmar	A weevil belonging to the family Mesophyletidae and the subfamily Mesophyletinae. The type species is L. rastellipes; genus also includes L. barbatus.	
Limodromus emetikos	Sp. nov	Valid	Gamboa & Ortuño	Eocene	Baltic amber	Europe (Baltic Sea coast)	A ground beetle belonging to the tribe Platynini.	
Lithogeraeus	Gen. et sp. nov	Valid	Legalov	Eocene	Green River Formation	United States	A weevil. The type species is L. greenriverensis.	
Louwiocis	Gen. et sp. nov	Valid	Clarke & Oberprieler in Clarke et al.	Late Cretaceous (Cenomanian)	Burmese amber	Myanmar	A weevil belonging to the family Mesophyletidae and the subfamily Mesophyletinae. The type species is L. megalops.	
Lycocerus christelae	Sp. nov	Valid	Kazantsev	Eocene	Baltic amber	Europe (Baltic region)	A soldier beetle.	
Lycocerus dentantennatus	Sp. nov	Valid	Kazantsev	Eocene	Baltic amber	Europe (Baltic region)	A soldier beetle.	
Malthinus rifbjergi	Sp. nov	Valid	Fanti & Damgaard	Eocene	Baltic amber	Russia (Kaliningrad Oblast)	A species of Malthinus.	
Malthodes aphidiphagus	Sp. nov	Valid	Fanti & Michalski	Eocene	Baltic amber	Poland	A species of Malthodes.	
Malthodes henningseni	Sp. nov	Valid	Fanti & Damgaard	Eocene	Baltic amber	Russia (Kaliningrad Oblast)	A species of Malthodes.	
Malthodes meriae	Sp. nov	Valid	Fanti	Eocene (Lutetian to Priabonian)	Baltic amber	Russia (Kaliningrad Oblast)	A species of Malthodes.	
Malthodes moellehavei	Sp. nov	Valid	Fanti & Damgaard	Eocene	Baltic amber	Russia (Kaliningrad Oblast)	A species of Malthodes.	
Markus	Gen. et sp. nov	Valid	Fanti & Pankowski	Eocene (Lutetian to Priabonian)	Baltic amber	Russia (Kaliningrad Oblast)	A soldier beetle belonging to the subfamily Silinae and the tribe Silini. The type species is M. karenae.	
Malthodes (Malthodes) josephi	Sp. nov	Valid	Fanti & Pankowski	Eocene (Priabonian)	Prussian Formation (Baltic amber)	Russia (Kaliningrad Oblast)	A species of Malthodes.	
Mekorhamphus beatae	Sp. nov	Valid	Clarke & Oberprieler in Clarke et al.	Late Cretaceous (Cenomanian)	Burmese amber	Myanmar	A weevil belonging to the family Mesophyletidae and the subfamily Mesophyletinae.	
Mekorhamphus gracilipes	Sp. nov	Valid	Clarke & Oberprieler in Clarke et al.	Late Cretaceous (Cenomanian)	Burmese amber	Myanmar	A weevil belonging to the family Mesophyletidae and the subfamily Mesophyletinae.	
Mekorhamphus poinari	Sp. nov	Valid	Clarke & Oberprieler in Clarke et al.	Late Cretaceous (Cenomanian)	Burmese amber	Myanmar	A weevil belonging to the family Mesophyletidae and the subfamily Mesophyletinae.	
Mekorhamphus tenuicornis	Sp. nov	Valid	Clarke & Oberprieler in Clarke et al.	Late Cretaceous (Cenomanian)	Burmese amber	Myanmar	A weevil belonging to the family Mesophyletidae and the subfamily Mesophyletinae.	
Menatoraea	Gen. et 4 sp. nov	Valid	Kirejtshuk & Nel	Paleocene		France	A sap beetle. The type species is M. typica; genus also includes M. angustitibialis, M. laticollis and M. gracilis.	
Microzavaljus	Gen. et sp. nov	Valid	Lyubarsky & Perkovsky	Eocene	Bitterfeld amber	Germany	A member of the family Erotylidae belonging to the subfamily Xenoscelinae. The type species is M. saxonicum.	
Miocenocylas	Gen. et sp. nov	Valid	Legalov	Middle Miocene	Upper Freshwater-Molasse Formation	Germany	A member of the family Brentidae belonging to the subfamily Cyladinae. Genus includes new species M. heeri.	
Molliberus	Gen. et sp. nov	Valid	Peris & Fanti	Early Cretaceous (Albian)		Spain	A soldier beetle known from amber from the Cave of El Soplao. Genus includes new species M. albae.	
Multispinus	Gen. et sp. nov	Valid	Bao et al.	Late Cretaceous (Cenomanian)	Burmese amber	Myanmar	A member of Tenebrionoidea belonging to the new family Apotomouridae. Genus includes new species M. multispinosus.	
Myanmarus	Gen. et 4 sp. nov	Valid	Clarke & Oberprieler in Clarke et al.	Late Cretaceous (Cenomanian)	Burmese amber	Myanmar	A weevil belonging to the family Mesophyletidae and the subfamily Mesophyletinae. The type species is M. caviventris; genus also includes M. robustus, M. dentifer and M. diversiunguis.	
Nicentrus curvirostris	Sp. nov	Valid	Legalov	Eocene	Green River Formation	United States	A species of Nicentrus.	
Nitoraeopsis	Gen. et sp. nov	Valid	Kirejtshuk & Nel	Paleocene		France	A sap beetle. Genus includes new species N. mixta.	
Noergaardia	Gen. et sp. nov	Valid	Fanti & Damgaard	Eocene	Baltic amber	Russia (Kaliningrad Oblast)	A soldier beetle belonging to the subfamily Cantharinae. The type species is N. dinae.	
Nuegua	Gen. et sp. nov	Valid	Yin, Cai & Newton	Late Cretaceous (Cenomanian)	Burmese amber	Myanmar	A glandulariine ant-like stone beetle. Genus includes new species N. elongata.	
Nugatorhinus	Gen. et 2 sp. nov	Valid	Clarke & Oberprieler in Clarke et al.	Late Cretaceous (Cenomanian)	Burmese amber	Myanmar	A weevil belonging to the family Mesophyletidae and the subfamily Aepyceratinae. The type species is N. chenyangi; genus also includes N. albomaculatus.	Nugatorhinus chenyangi
Ocriocis	Gen. et sp. nov	Valid	Clarke & Oberprieler in Clarke et al.	Late Cretaceous (Cenomanian)	Burmese amber	Myanmar	A weevil belonging to the family Mesophyletidae and the subfamily Mesophyletinae. The type species is O. binodosus.	
Opeatorhynchus	Gen. et sp. nov	Valid	Clarke & Oberprieler in Clarke et al.	Late Cretaceous (Cenomanian)	Burmese amber	Myanmar	A weevil belonging to the family Mesophyletidae and the subfamily Mesophyletinae. The type species is O. comans.	
Ornatomalthinus ruicheni	Sp. nov	Valid	Hsiao & Huang	Late Cretaceous (Cenomanian)	Burmese amber	Myanmar	A soldier beetle. Originally described as a species of Ornatomalthinus; Fanti (2018) transferred this species to the genus Sanaungulus.	
Orsunius electronefelus	Sp. nov	Valid	Kypke & Solodovnikov	Eocene	Rovno amber	Ukraine	A rove beetle belonging to the subfamily Paederinae, tribe Lathrobiini and subtribe Medonina.	
Oxycorynoides bucklowae	Sp. nov	Valid	Legalov & Jarzembowski	Early Cretaceous (Barremian)	Upper Weald Clay Formation	United Kingdom	A weevil belonging to the family Nemonychidae.	
Palaecoryphus	Gen. et sp. nov	Valid	Alekseev & Tomaszewska	Late Eocene	Baltic amber	Russia (Kaliningrad Oblast)	A member of Coccinelloidea belonging to the family Anamorphidae. The type species is P. viktori.	
Palaeolycra	Gen. et sp. nov	Valid	Kirejtshuk & Nel	Paleocene		France	A sap beetle. Genus includes new species P. palaeocenica.	
Palaeomallerus	Gen. et sp. nov	Valid	Legalov	Eocene	Green River Formation	United States	A weevil. The type species is P. longirostris.	
Palaeomycetes	Gen. et sp. nov	Valid	Tomaszewska, Ślipiński & Ren in Tomaszewska et al.	Late Cretaceous (Cenomanian)	Burmese amber	Myanmar	A member of the family Endomychidae. Genus includes new species P. foveolatus.	
Palaeotylus	Gen. et sp. nov	Valid	Poinar, Vega & Legalov	Late Cretaceous (Cenomanian)	Burmese amber	Myanmar	Originally described as an ambrosia beetle; subsequently considered to be unlikely to belong to Curculionoidea by Clarke et al. (2018). Genus includes new species P. femoralis.	
Palmnickeneoceras	Gen. et sp. nov	Valid	Fanti & Damgaard	Eocene	Baltic amber	Russia (Kaliningrad Oblast)	A soldier beetle belonging to the subfamily Cantharinae. The type species is P. ejersboi.	
Pangusyndicus	Gen. et sp. nov	Valid	Yin, Zhou & Cai in Yin et al.	Late Cretaceous (Cenomanian)	Burmese amber	Myanmar	An ant-like stone beetle. Genus includes new species P. excavatus.	
Paraodontomma szwedoi	Sp. nov	Valid	Jarzembowski, Wang & Zheng	Late Cretaceous (Cenomanian)	Burmese amber	Myanmar	A member of the family Ommatidae belonging to the tribe Brochocoleini.	Paraodontomma szwedoi
Perapion rasnitsyni	Sp. nov	Valid	Legalov	Eocene	Green River Formation	United States	A weevil, a species of Perapion.	
Periosocerus	Gen. et 2 sp. nov	Valid	Clarke & Oberprieler in Clarke et al.	Late Cretaceous (Cenomanian)	Burmese amber	Myanmar	A weevil belonging to the family Mesophyletidae and the subfamily Mesophyletinae. The type species is P. deplanatus; genus also includes P. crenulatus.	
Perroudia manuherikia	Sp. nov	Valid	Kaulfuss et al.	Early Miocene	Manuherikia Group	New Zealand	A member of the family Brentidae.	
Petalotarsus	Gen. et 3 sp. nov	Valid	Clarke & Oberprieler in Clarke et al.	Late Cretaceous (Cenomanian)	Burmese amber	Myanmar	A weevil belonging to the family Mesophyletidae and the subfamily Mesophyletinae. The type species is P. oxycorynoides; genus also includes P. curculionoides and P. cylindricus.	
Platychirus	Gen. et sp. nov	Junior homonym	Clarke & Oberprieler in Clarke et al.	Late Cretaceous (Cenomanian)	Burmese amber	Myanmar	A weevil belonging to the family Mesophyletidae and the subfamily Aepyceratinae. The type species is P. beloides. The generic name is preoccupied by Platychirus Agassiz (1846); Clarke & Oberprieler (2019) coined a replacement name Burmophyletis.	Burmophyletis beloides
Platypelochares electricus	Sp. nov.	Valid	Hernando, Szawaryn & Ribera	Eocene (Lutetian)	Baltic amber	Europe (Gdańsk Bay area)	A member of the family Limnichidae. Originally described as a species of Platypelochares, but subsequently made the type species of the separate genus Hernandochares.	
Plesiotoma	Gen. et sp. nov	Valid	Batelka, Engel & Prokop	Late Cretaceous (Cenomanian)	Burmese amber	Myanmar	A member of the family Ripiphoridae. The type species is P. alissae.	
Podistra kloevedali	Sp. nov	Valid	Fanti & Damgaard	Eocene	Baltic amber	Russia (Kaliningrad Oblast)	A soldier beetle belonging to the subfamily Cantharinae.	
Poinarinius	Gen. et sp. nov	Valid	Legalov	Late Cretaceous (Cenomanian)	Burmese amber	Myanmar	An auger beetle belonging to the subfamily Dinoderinae. Genus includes new species P. burmaensis.	
Ponomarenkium	Nom. nov	Valid	Yan et al.	Late Permian	Newcastle Coal Measures	Australia	A beetle of uncertain phylogenetic placement, assigned to the new family Ponomarenkiidae; a replacement name for Ponomarenkia Yan et al. (2017).	
Praphennium	Gen. et sp. nov	Valid	Jałoszyński	Late Cretaceous (Cenomanian)	Burmese amber	Myanmar	A rove beetle belonging to the subfamily Scydmaeninae and the tribe Cephenniini. Genus includes new species P. carinatum.	
Primocentron	Gen. et sp. nov	Valid	Legalov	Eocene	Green River Formation	United States	A weevil. The type species is P. wickhami.	
Procleomenes gouverneuri	Sp. nov	Valid	Vitali	Eocene	Baltic amber	Europe (Baltic Sea region)	A longhorn beetle.	
Propiestus	Gen. et sp. nov	Valid	Yamamoto, Caron & Bortoluzzi	Late Cretaceous (Cenomanian)	Burmese amber	Myanmar	A rove beetle belonging to the subfamily Piestinae. Genus includes new species P. archaicus.	
Protoripidius	Gen. et sp. nov	Valid	Cai, Yin & Huang	Late Cretaceous (Cenomanian)	Burmese amber	Myanmar	A member of the family Ripiphoridae and the subfamily Ripidiinae. Genus includes new species P. burmiticus.	
Pseudochirotenon	Gen. et sp. nov	Valid	Legalov	Eocene	Green River Formation	United States	A fungus weevil. The type species is P. eocaenicus.	
Pseudochrysomelites dvinensis	Sp. nov	Valid	Ponomarenko	Late Permian	Komarity Beds of the Salaraevo Formation	Russia	A member of the family Schizocoleidae.	
Pseudophaops	Gen. et comb. nov	Valid	Legalov	Eocene	Green River Formation	United States	An Eustylini tribe entimine weevil. The type species is Otiorhynchus perditus (1876).	
Rhadinomycter	Gen. et sp. nov	Valid	Clarke & Oberprieler in Clarke et al.	Late Cretaceous (Cenomanian)	Burmese amber	Myanmar	A weevil belonging to the family Mesophyletidae and the subfamily Mesophyletinae. The type species is R. perplexus.	
Rhagonycha (Rhagonycha) maryae	Sp. nov	Valid	Fanti & Pankowski	Eocene (Priabonian)	Prussian Formation (Baltic amber)	Russia (Kaliningrad Oblast)	A species of Rhagonycha.	
Rhagonycha nielsenae	Sp. nov	Valid	Fanti & Damgaard	Eocene	Baltic amber	Russia (Kaliningrad Oblast)	A species of Rhagonycha.	
Rhynchitomimus	Gen. et sp. nov	Valid	Clarke & Oberprieler in Clarke et al.	Late Cretaceous (Cenomanian)	Burmese amber	Myanmar	A weevil belonging to the family Mesophyletidae and the subfamily Aepyceratinae. The type species is R. chalybeus.	Rhynchitomimus chalybeus
Sanaungulus	Gen. et 2 sp. nov	Valid	Fanti, Damgaard & Ellenberger	Late Cretaceous (Cenomanian)	Burmese amber	Myanmar	A soldier beetle. Genus includes new species S. curtipennis and S. ghitaenoerbyae.	
Scydmobisetia loebli	Sp. nov	Valid	Yin, Zhou & Cai	Late Cretaceous (Cenomanian)	Burmese amber	Myanmar	An ant-like stone beetle.	
Scydmobisetia mengjiae	Sp. nov	Valid	Yin, Zhou & Cai	Late Cretaceous (Cenomanian)	Burmese amber	Myanmar	An ant-like stone beetle.	
Seidlitzella hoffeinsorum	Sp. nov	Valid	Kolibáč & Alekseev	Eocene	Baltic amber	Europe (Baltic Sea coast)	A member of the family Trogossitidae belonging to the tribe Gymnochilini.	
Serangium gedanicum	Sp. nov	Valid	Szawaryn & Szwedo	Eocene	Baltic amber	Europe (Baltic Sea coast)	A member of the family Coccinellidae.	
Serangium twardowskii	Sp. nov	Valid	Szawaryn & Szwedo	Eocene	Baltic amber	Europe (Baltic Sea coast)	A member of the family Coccinellidae.	
Shixitomaria	Gen. et comb. nov	Valid	Lyubarsky & Perkovsky	Early Cretaceous (Aptian-Albian)	Shixi Formation	China	A member of the family Cryptophagidae belonging to the subfamily Atomariinae; a new genus for "Atomaria" cretacea Cai & Wang (2013).	
Sinochaetodus	Gen. et sp. nov	Valid	Lu et al.	Early Cretaceous	Yixian Formation	China	A member of the family Hybosoridae. Genus includes new species S. tridentatus.	
Sinohybosorus	Gen. et sp. nov	Valid	Lu et al.	Early Cretaceous	Yixian Formation	China	A member of the family Hybosoridae. Genus includes new species S. cheni.	
Sorodites	Gen. et sp. nov	Valid	Kirejtshuk & Chetverikov	Late Cretaceous (Cenomanian)	Burmese amber	Myanmar	A sap beetle. Genus includes new species S. angustipes.	
Soronia menatensis	Sp. nov	Valid	Kirejtshuk & Nel	Paleocene		France	A sap beetle.	
Spinotoma	Gen. et sp. nov	Valid	Hsiao & Huang	Late Cretaceous (Cenomanian)	Burmese amber	Myanmar	A member of the family Ripiphoridae belonging to the subfamily Pelecotominae. The type species is S. ruicheni.	
Succinumanax	Gen. et sp. nov	Valid	Bao, Rust & Wang	Late Cretaceous (Cenomanian)	Burmese amber	Myanmar	A water-penny beetle belonging to the subfamily Eubrianacinae. Genus includes new species is S. birmaniasis.	
Sucinorhagonycha samsockorum	Sp. nov	Valid	Fanti & Pankowski	Eocene (Priabonian)	Prussian Formation (Baltic amber)	Russia (Kaliningrad Oblast)	A soldier beetle belonging to the subfamily Cantharinae and the tribe Cantharini.	
Symbiotes borussiaeorientalis	Sp. nov	Valid	Alekseev & Tomaszewska	Late Eocene	Baltic amber	Russia (Kaliningrad Oblast)	A member of Coccinelloidea belonging to the family Anamorphidae.	
Taimyraltica	Gen. et sp. nov	Valid	Nadein in Nadein & Perkovsky	Late Cretaceous (Santonian)	Taimyr amber	Russia	A leaf beetle belonging to the subfamily Galerucinae. Genus includes new species T. calcarata.	
Tetracoleus aristovi	Sp. nov	Valid	Ponomarenko	Late Permian	Komarity Beds of the Salaraevo Formation	Russia	A member of the family Asiocoleidae.	
Tetracoleus meyeni	Sp. nov	Valid	Ponomarenko	Late Permian	Komarity Beds of the Salaraevo Formation	Russia	A member of the family Asiocoleidae.	
Tetracoleus vasilenkoi	Sp. nov	Valid	Ponomarenko	Late Permian	Komarity Beds of the Salaraevo Formation	Russia	A member of the family Asiocoleidae.	
Themus bennyianderseni	Sp. nov	Valid	Fanti & Damgaard	Eocene	Baltic amber	Russia (Kaliningrad Oblast)	A soldier beetle belonging to the subfamily Cantharinae.	
Tomoxia succinea	Sp. nov	Valid	Bao et al.	Eocene	Baltic amber	Europe (Baltic Sea region)	A species of Tomoxia.	
Trichodesma fennosarmatica	Sp. nov	Valid	Bukejs, Háva & Alekseev	Eocene	Baltic amber	Russia (Kaliningrad Oblast)	A species of Trichodesma.	
Trochoideus koenigsbergicus	Sp. nov	Valid	Alekseev & Tomaszewska	Late Eocene	Baltic amber	Russia (Kaliningrad Oblast)	A member of the family Endomychidae.	
Trochoideus resinatissimus	Sp. nov	Valid	Alekseev & Tomaszewska	Late Eocene	Bitterfeld amber	Germany	A member of the family Endomychidae.	
Tunguskagyrus	Gen. et sp. et comb. nov		Yan, Beutel & Lawrence	Permian (Changhsingian)	Lebedevskian Horizon	Russia	A beetle of uncertain phylogenetic placement; originally described as a whirligig beetle, but subsequently argued to be a member of the family Triaplidae instead. The type species is T. planus; genus might also include "Triaplus" sibiricus Volkov (2013), though this species was also argued to be a member of the genus Tomiaplus instead.	
Tychtocoleus popovi	Sp. nov	Valid	Ponomarenko	Late Permian	Komarity Beds of the Salaraevo Formation	Russia	A member of the family Permosynidae.	
Vetatrecus	Gen. et 2 sp. nov	Valid	Kypke et al.	Late Cretaceous (Cenomanian)	Burmese amber	Myanmar	A rove beetle belonging to the subfamily Staphylininae and the tribe Othiini. Genus includes new species V. adelfiae and V. secretum.	
Vetudasycerus	Gen. et sp. nov	Valid	Cai et al.	Late Cretaceous (Cenomanian)	Burmese amber	Myanmar	A rove beetle belonging to the subfamily Dasycerinae. Genus includes new species V. burmiticus.	
Vetujinbrianax	Gen. et sp. nov	Valid	Cai & Huang	Late Cretaceous (Cenomanian)	Burmese amber	Myanmar	A water-penny beetle. Genus includes new species V. cretaceus.	
Zemyna	Gen. et sp. nov	Valid	Tomaszewska in Tomaszewska et al.	Late Eocene	Baltic amber	Russia (Kaliningrad Oblast)	A member of the family Endomychidae. Genus was originally named Laima Alekseev & Tomaszewska (2018); however, this generic name turned out to be preoccupied by Laima Gravitis (1981). The type species is Z. andreei (Alekseev & Tomaszewska, 2018).	

=== Dermapterans ===
Name	Novelty	Status	Authors	Age	Unit	Type Location	Notes	Images
Acanthodiplatys	Gen. et sp. nov	Valid	Ren et al.	Late Cretaceous (Cenomanian)	Burmese amber	Myanmar	A member of the family Diplatyidae. Genus includes new species A. leptocercus.	
Brevicula maculata	Sp. nov	Valid	Kelly, Ross & Jarzembowski	Early Jurassic (Sinemurian)	Charmouth Mudstone Formation	United Kingdom	An earwig belonging to the family Protodiplatyidae.	
Dimapteron	Gen. et sp. nov	Valid	Kelly, Ross & Jarzembowski	Early Cretaceous (Berriasian)	Durlston Formation	United Kingdom	An earwig, possibly a member of the family Dermapteridae. The type species is D. corami.	
Hirtidiplatys	Gen. et sp. nov	Valid	Ren et al.	Late Cretaceous (Cenomanian)	Burmese amber	Myanmar	A member of the family Diplatyidae. Genus includes new species H. cardiophyllus.	
Phanerogramma australis	Sp. nov	Valid	Kelly, Ross & Jarzembowski	Late Triassic (Carnian)	Blackstone Formation	Australia	An earwig, possibly a member of the family Dermapteridae.	
Phanerogramma dunstani	Sp. nov	Valid	Kelly, Ross & Jarzembowski	Late Triassic (Carnian)	Blackstone Formation	Australia	An earwig, possibly a member of the family Dermapteridae.	
Phanerogramma gouldsbroughi	Sp. nov	Valid	Kelly, Ross & Jarzembowski	Rhaetian or Hettangian		United Kingdom	An earwig, possibly a member of the family Dermapteridae.	
Robustipygia	Gen. et sp. nov	Valid	Ren et al.	Late Cretaceous (Cenomanian)	Burmese amber	Myanmar	A member of the family Pygidicranidae. Genus includes new species R. calvata.	
Trivenapteron	Gen. et sp. nov	Valid	Kelly, Ross & Jarzembowski	Early Jurassic (Toarcian)		United Kingdom	An earwig of uncertain phylogenetic placement. The type species is T. moorei.	
Tytthodiplatys ortholabis	Sp. nov	Valid	Ren et al.	Late Cretaceous (Cenomanian)	Burmese amber	Myanmar	A member of the family Diplatyidae.	
Valdopteron	Gen. et sp. nov	Valid	Kelly, Ross & Jarzembowski	Early Cretaceous (Barremian)	Upper Weald Clay	United Kingdom	An earwig, possibly a member of the family Dermapteridae. The type species is V. woodi.	

=== Dictyopterans ===
Name	Novelty	Status	Authors	Age	Unit	Type Location	Notes	Images
Alienopterella	Gen. et sp. nov	Valid	Kočárek	Late Cretaceous (Cenomanian)	Burmese amber	Myanmar	A relative of Alienopterus. Genus includes new species A. stigmatica.	
Alienopterix	Gen. et sp. nov	Valid	Mlynský, Vršanský & Wang in Vršanský et al.	Late Cretaceous (Cenomanian)	Burmese amber	Myanmar	A relative of Alienopterus or a member of the family Cratovitismidae. The type species is A. ocularis.	
Apiblatta	Gen. et sp. nov	Valid	Barna & Bigalk in Vršanský et al.	Early Cretaceous (Albian)	Crato Formation	Brazil	A relative of Alienopterus. The type species is A. muratai.	
Burmantis hexispinea	Sp. nov	Valid	Li & Huang	Late Cretaceous (Cenomanian)	Burmese amber	Myanmar	A mantis.	
Caputoraptor	Gen. et 2 sp. nov	Valid	Bai, Beutel & Wipfler in Bai et al.	Late Cretaceous (Cenomanian)	Burmese amber	Myanmar	A relative of Alienopterus. The type species is C. elegans; genus also includes C. vidit Šmídová, Vršanský & Wang in Vršanský et al. (2018).	
Chimaeroblattina	Gen. et sp. nov	Valid	Barna in Vršanský et al.	Middle Eocene	Green River Formation	United States	A relative of Alienopterus. The type species is C. brevipes.	
Cratovitisma bechlyi	Sp. nov	Valid	Podstrelená in Podstrelená & Sendi	Late Cretaceous (Cenomanian)	Burmese amber	Myanmar	A beetle-like cockroach belonging to the family Umenocoleidae.	
Cratovitisma cortexi	Sp. nov	Valid	Sendi in Podstrelená & Sendi	Early Cretaceous	Lebanese amber	Lebanon	A beetle-like cockroach belonging to the family Umenocoleidae.	
Falcatusiblatta	Gen. et 2 sp. et comb. nov	Valid	Liang, Shih & Ren	Middle and Late Jurassic	Daohugou Beds; Karabastau Svita	China; Kazakhstan	A cockroach belonging to the family Raphidiomimidae. Genus includes new species F. gracilis and F. qiandaohua, as well as "Rhipidoblattina" karatavica Vishniakova (1968).	
Grant	Gen. et sp. nov	Valid	Aristov in Vršanský et al.	Middle Eocene	Green River Formation	United States	A relative of Alienopterus. The type species is G. viridifluvius.	
Meilia	Gen. et sp. nov	Valid	Vršanský et Wang in Vršanský et al.	Late Cretaceous (Cenomanian)	Burmese amber	Myanmar	A relative of Alienopterus. The type species is M. jinghanae.	
Nodosigalea	Gen. et sp. nov	Valid	Li & Huang	Late Cretaceous (Cenomanian)	Burmese amber	Myanmar	A cockroach belonging to the family Corydiidae. Genus includes new species N. burmanica.	
Phyloblatta beijingensis	Sp. nov	Valid	Huang et al.	Carboniferous-Permian	Taiyuan Formation	China	A cockroach.	
Piniblattella yixianensis	Sp. nov	Valid	Gao, Shih & Ren in Gao et al.	Early Cretaceous	Yixian Formation	China	A cockroach. Transferred to the genus Spinaeblattina by Hinkelman (2019).	
Teyia	Gen. et 2 sp. nov	Valid	Vršanský, Mlynský & Wang in Vršanský et al.	Late Cretaceous (Cenomanian)	Burmese amber	Myanmar	A relative of Alienopterus. The type species is T. branislav Vršanský & Wang (2018); genus also includes T. huangi Vršanský, Mlynský & Wang (2018).	
Vcelesvab	Gen. et sp. nov	Valid	Vršanský, Barna & Bigalk in Vršanský et al.	Early Cretaceous (Albian)	Crato Formation	Brazil	A relative of Alienopterus. The type species is V. cratocretokrat.	

=== Dipterans ===
Name	Novelty	Status	Authors	Age	Unit	Type Location	Notes	Images
Acartophthalmites willii	Sp. nov	Valid	Pérez-de la Fuente, Hoffeins & Roháček	Eocene	Baltic amber	Baltic Sea coast, probably Russia (Kaliningrad Oblast)	A member of Opomyzoidea of uncertain phylogenetic placement.	
Alonchoptera	Gen. et sp. nov	Valid	Grimaldi	Early Cretaceous		Lebanon	A member of the stem group of Lonchopteroidea. The type species is A. lebanica.	
Archilimonia grauvogeliana	Sp. nov	Valid	Lukashevich & Ribeiro	Middle Triassic (Anisian)		France	An early member of Tipuloidea.	
Archipleciomima germanica	Sp. nov	Valid	Kopeć et al.	Early Jurassic (Toarcian)		Germany	A member of Mycetophiloidea.	
Aschizomyia	Gen. et sp. nov	Valid	Grimaldi	Late Cretaceous (Cenomanian)	Burmese amber	Myanmar	A member of Syrphoidea of uncertain phylogenetic placement. The type species is A. burmensis.	
Austroconops perrichoti	Sp. nov	Valid	Dominiak, Szadziewski & Nel	Cretaceous (latest Albian-earliest Cenomanian)		France	A member of the family Ceratopogonidae belonging to the subfamily Leptoconopinae.	
Burmapeza	Gen. et sp. nov	Valid	Grimaldi	Late Cretaceous (Cenomanian)	Burmese amber	Myanmar	A member of the family Platypezidae. The type species is B. radicis.	
Burmazelmira grimaldii	Sp. nov	Valid	Arillo, Blagoderov & Peñalver	Early Cretaceous (Albian)	Maestrat Basin	Spain	A member of Archizelmiridae.	
Calvopeza	Gen. et sp. nov	Valid	Grimaldi	Late Cretaceous (Cenomanian)	Burmese amber	Myanmar	A member of the family Platypezidae. The type species is C. divergens.	
Canadopeza	Gen. et sp. nov	Valid	Grimaldi	Late Cretaceous		Canada	A member of the family Platypezidae. The type species is C. biacrosticha.	
Chandleromyia	Gen. et sp. nov	Valid	Grimaldi	Late Cretaceous (Cenomanian)	Burmese amber	Myanmar	A member of the family Platypezidae. The type species is C. anomala.	
Dacochile browni	Sp. nov	Valid	Skibińska & Krzemiński	Late Cretaceous (Cenomanian)	Burmese amber	Myanmar	A member of the family Tanyderidae.	
Dacochile poinari	Sp. nov	Valid	Skibińska & Krzemiński	Late Cretaceous (Cenomanian)	Burmese amber	Myanmar	A member of the family Tanyderidae.	
Dicranomyia (Dicranomyia) colombiana	Sp. nov	Valid	Krzemiński et al.		Colombian copal	Colombia	A species of Dicranomyia.	
Dicranomyia (Dicranomyia) indica	Sp. nov	Valid	Kania et al.	Early Eocene	Cambay amber	India	A species of Dicranomyia.	
Dicranomyia (Melanolimonia) kukulai	Sp. nov	Valid	Krzemiński, Kania & Wojtoń	Eocene	Baltic amber	Europe (Baltic Sea coast)	A species of Dicranomyia.	
Eodromyia	Gen. et sp. nov	Valid	Myskowiak, Garrouste & Nel	Early Eocene	Oise amber	France	A member of the family Hybotidae. Genus includes new species E. pumilio.	
Eoprocladius	Gen. et sp. nov	Valid	Szadziewski, Sontag & Dominiak	Eocene	Baltic amber	Baltic Sea region	A member of the family Chironomidae belonging to the subfamily Tanypodinae and the tribe Procladiini. Genus includes new species E. hoffeinsorum.	
Eosciadocera pauciseta	Sp. nov	Valid	Grimaldi	Eocene	Baltic amber	Europe (Baltic Sea region)	A member of the family Phoridae belonging to the subfamily Sciadocerinae.	
Gujaratomyia	Gen. et sp. nov	Valid	Giłka & Zakrzewska in Zakrzewska et al.	Early Eocene	Cambay amber	India	A non-biting midge belonging to the tribe Tanytarsini. Genus includes new species G. miripes.	
Helius spiralensis	Sp. nov	Valid	Kania, Krzemiński & Arillo	Early Cretaceous	Álava amber	Spain	A species of Helius.	
Irwinimyia	Gen. et sp. nov	Valid	Zhang et al.	Late Cretaceous (Cenomanian)	Burmese amber	Myanmar	A member of Apsilocephalidae. Genus includes new species I. spinosa.	
Langtonius	Gen. et sp. nov	Valid	Lukashevich & Przhiboro	Early Cretaceous	Tsagan Tsab Formation	Mongolia	A member of the family Chironomidae. Genus includes new species L. cynaricaudatus.	
Lebanopeza	Gen. et sp. nov	Valid	Grimaldi	Early Cretaceous		Lebanon	A member of the family Platypezidae. The type species is L. azari.	
Libanosycorax	Gen. et sp. nov	Valid	Azar, Azar & Maksoud	Early Cretaceous		Lebanon	A relative of members of the genus Sycorax. Genus includes new species L. dimyi.	
Lindneromyia dominicana	Sp. nov	Valid	Grimaldi	Miocene	Dominican amber	Dominican Republic	A species of Lindneromyia.	
Lindneromyia neomedialis	Sp. nov	Valid	Grimaldi	Miocene	Dominican amber	Dominican Republic	A species of Lindneromyia.	
Lonchopterites burmensis	Sp. nov	Valid	Grimaldi	Late Cretaceous (Cenomanian)	Burmese amber	Myanmar	A member of the stem group of Lonchopteroidea.	
Macalpinomyia	Gen. et sp. nov	Valid	Li & Yeates	Late Cretaceous (Cenomanian)	Burmese amber	Myanmar	A member of the family Ironomyiidae. Genus includes new species M. jiewenae.	
Mailotrichocera praedicta	Sp. nov	Valid	Krzemińska & Lukashevich	Early Jurassic (possibly Sinemurian)	Dzil Formation	Kyrgyzstan	A member of the family Trichoceridae.	
Mesorhyphus ulrichi	Sp. nov	Valid	Kopeć et al.	Early Jurassic (Toarcian)		Germany	A member of the family Anisopodidae.	
Mesotipula slatteri	Sp. nov	Valid	Kopeć	Early Jurassic		United Kingdom	A member of Limoniidae.	
Myanmarpsilocephala	Gen. et sp. nov	Valid	Zhang et al.	Late Cretaceous (Cenomanian)	Burmese amber	Myanmar	A member of Apsilocephalidae. Genus includes new species M. grimaldii.	
Neuseptychoptera	Gen. et sp. nov	Valid	Szadziewski, Krynicki & Krzemiński	Late Cretaceous (Campanian)	Tar Heel Formation	United States	A member of Ptychopteridae belonging to the subfamily Eoptychopterinae. Genus includes new species N. carolinensis.	
Oligopipiza	Gen et sp. nov	Valid	Nidergras, Hadrava & Nel in Nidergas et al.	Oligocene		France	A hoverfly. The type species is O. quadriguttata.	
Palaeopetia dorsalis	Sp. nov	Valid	Grimaldi	Late Cretaceous (Cenomanian)	Burmese amber	Myanmar	A member of the family Ironomyiidae.	
Palaeopetia terminus	Sp. nov	Valid	Grimaldi	Late Cretaceous (Cenomanian)	Burmese amber	Myanmar	A member of the family Ironomyiidae.	
Proironia	Gen. et 2 sp. nov	Valid	Grimaldi	Late Cretaceous (Cenomanian)	Burmese amber	Myanmar	A member of the family Ironomyiidae. The type species is P. gibbera; genus also includes P. burmitica.	
Prophora	Gen. et sp. nov	Valid	Grimaldi	Late Cretaceous (Cenomianian)	Burmese amber	Myanmar	A member of the family Phoridae of uncertain phylogenetic placement. The type species is P. dimorion.	
Prosyrphus	Gen. et sp. nov	Valid	Grimaldi	Late Cretaceous (Cenomanian)	Burmese amber	Myanmar	A possible stem-hoverfly. The type species is P. thompsoni.	
Serromyia errata	Sp. nov	Valid	Szadziewski	Eocene	Bitterfeld amber	Germany	A species of Serromyia; a new species established for the specimens originally assigned to the species Serromyia alphea (Heyden, 1870).	
Similinannotanyderus zbigniewi	Sp. nov	Valid	Skibińska & Krzemiński	Late Cretaceous (Cenomanian)	Burmese amber	Myanmar	A member of the family Tanyderidae.	
Sylvicola baltica	Sp. nov	Valid	Wojtoń, Kania & Kopeć	Eocene	Baltic amber	Baltic Sea region	A species of Sylvicola.	
Sylvicola hoffeinsorum	Sp. nov	Valid	Wojtoń, Kania & Kopeć	Eocene	Baltic amber Bitterfeld amber	Baltic Sea region Germany	A species of Sylvicola.	
Sylvicola punctata	Sp. nov	Junior homonym	Wojtoń, Kania & Kopeć	Eocene	Baltic amber	Baltic Sea region	A species of Sylvicola. The name is preoccupied by Sylvicola punctatus (Fabricius, 1787); Hancock & Kania (2019) coined a replacement name Sylvicola harrisi.	
Tipula americana	Sp. nov	Valid	Kania et al.	Eocene	Green River Formation	United States	A species of Tipula.	
Ugolyakia	Gen. et sp. nov	Valid	Perkovsky, Sukhomlin & Zelenkov	Late Cretaceous (Santonian)	Taimyr amber	Russia	A black fly. Genus includes new species U. kaluginae.	

=== Hemipterans ===
Name	Novelty	Status	Authors	Age	Unit	Type Location	Notes	Images
Anthoscytina daidaleos	Sp. nov	Valid	Fu, Huang & Engel	Middle or Late Jurassic	Haifanggou Formation	China	A froghopper belonging to the family Procercopidae.	
Aphrastomedes	Gen. et sp. nov	Valid	Yamada & Yamamoto in Yamada, Yamamoto & Takahashi	Late Cretaceous (Cenomanian)	Burmese amber	Myanmar	A member of Cimicomorpha, probably belonging to the family Velocipedidae. Genus includes new species A. anthocoroides.	
Archetingis	Gen. et sp. nov	Valid	Montagna et al.	Middle Triassic (Ladinian)	Meride Limestone	Switzerland	A member of the family Tingidae. The type species is A. ladinica.	
Archipedionis	Gen. et sp. nov	Valid	Dietrich & Thomas	Eocene	Baltic amber	Europe (Baltic Sea coast)	A leafhopper belonging to the subfamily Eurymelinae and the tribe Macropsini. The type species is A. obscurus.	
Burmacader lativentris	Sp. nov	Valid	Heiss & Guilbert	Late Cretaceous (Cenomanian)	Burmese amber	Myanmar	A member of Tingidae.	
Camuracicada	Gen. et comb. nov	Valid	Moulds	Miocene (Serravallian)		Croatia	A cicada; a new genus for "Cicada" aichhorni Heer (1853).	
Chilamnestocoris	Gen. et sp. nov	Valid	Lis, Lis & Heiss	Late Cretaceous (Cenomanian)	Burmese amber	Myanmar	A member of the family Cydnidae. Genus includes new species C. mixtus.	
Criniverticillus	Gen. et sp. nov	Valid	Lin, Yao & Ren	Cretaceous (Albian-Cenomanian)	Burmese amber	Myanmar	A relative of scale insects belonging to the family Weitschatidae. Genus includes new species C. longicumulus.	
Cucullitingis	Gen. et sp. nov	Valid	Du & Yao	Late Cretaceous (Cenomanian)	Burmese amber	Myanmar	A member of Tingidae. The type species is C. biacantha.	
Dachibangus	Gen. et sp. nov	Valid	Jiang, Szwedo & Wang	Late Cretaceous (Cenomanian)	Burmese amber	Myanmar	A planthopper belonging to the family Mimarachnidae. Genus includes new species D. trimaculatus.	
Dorytocus	Gen. et sp. nov	Valid	Emeljanov & Shcherbakov	Late Cretaceous (Cenomanian)	Burmese amber	Myanmar	A planthopper belonging to the new family Dorytocidae. Genus includes new species D. ornithorhynchus.	
Eoidiocerus	Gen. et sp. nov	Valid	Dietrich & Thomas	Eocene	Baltic amber	Europe (Baltic Sea coast)	A leafhopper belonging to the subfamily Eurymelinae and the tribe Idiocerini. The type species is E. emarginatus.	
Fangyuania	Gen. et sp. nov	Valid	Chen, Szwedo & Wang in Chen et al.	Late Cretaceous (Cenomanian)	Burmese amber	Myanmar	A froghopper belonging to the family Sinoalidae. Genus includes new species F. xiai.	
Hormatalis	Gen. et sp. nov	Valid	Węgierek & Wang in Węgierek et al.	Late Cretaceous (Cenomanian)	Burmese amber	Myanmar	An aphid belonging to the family Isolitaphidae. Genus includes new species H. lancigerens.	
Jaculistilus	Gen. et sp. nov	Valid	Zhang, Ren & Yao	Late Cretaceous (Cenomanian)	Burmese amber	Myanmar	A planthopper belonging to the family Mimarachnidae. Genus includes new species J. oligotrichus.	
Leptopharsa antica	Sp. nov	Valid	Golub & Heiss	Eocene or Miocene	Dominican amber	Dominican Republic	A species of Leptopharsa.	
Leptopharsa colombiana	Sp. nov	Valid	Golub & Heiss		Colombian copal	Colombia	A species of Leptopharsa.	
Luanpingia daohugouensis	Sp. nov	Valid	Fu, Cai & Huang	Middle or Late Jurassic	Daohugou Beds	China	A froghopper belonging to the family Sinoalidae.	
Paleopsalta	Gen. et comb. nov	Valid	Moulds	Miocene (Serravallian)		Croatia	A cicada; a new genus for "Cicada" ungeri Heer (1853).	
Phatnoma pulchra	Sp. nov	Valid	Golub & Heiss	Eocene or Miocene	Dominican amber	Dominican Republic	A member of the family Tingidae.	
Prolavexillaphis	Gen. et sp. nov	Valid	Liu, Qiao & Yao in Liu et al.	Late Cretaceous (Cenomanian)	Burmese amber	Myanmar	An aphid belonging to the family Juraphididae. Genus includes new species P. munditia.	
Stictocercopis	Gen. et sp. nov	Valid	Fu & Huang	Jurassic (Callovian or Oxfordian)	Haifanggou Formation	China	A froghopper belonging to the family Sinoalidae. The type species is S. wuhuaensis.	
Tanyaulus	Gen. et sp. nov	Valid	Poinar	Cenomanian	Burmese amber	Myanmar	An aphid belonging to the family Burmitaphidae. Genus includes new species T. caudisetula.	

=== Hymenopterans ===
Name	Novelty	Status	Authorship of new name	Age	Unit	Type Location	Notes	Images
Amplicella minor	Sp. nov	Valid	Kopylov	Early Cretaceous		Russia	A member of the family Ichneumonidae.	
Angarosphex saxosus	Sp. nov	Valid	Zhang, Rasnitsyn & Zhang	Early Cretaceous	Yixian Formation	China	A member of Apoidea belonging to the family Angarosphecidae.	
Apis (Synapis) dalica	Sp. nov	Valid	Engel & Wappler in Engel et al.	Middle Miocene	Huazhige Formation	China	A honey bee.	
Aptenoperissus amabilis	Sp. nov	Valid	Zhang et al.	Cenomanian	Burmese amber	Myanmar	A wasp belonging to the family Aptenoperissidae.	
Aptenoperissus delicatus	Sp. nov	Valid	Zhang et al.	Cenomanian	Burmese amber	Myanmar	A wasp belonging to the family Aptenoperissidae.	
Aptenoperissus etius	Sp. nov	Valid	Rasnitsyn & Öhm-Kühnle	Late Cretaceous (Cenomanian)	Burmese amber	Myanmar	A wasp belonging to the family Aptenoperissidae.	
Aptenoperissus formosus	Sp. nov	Valid	Zhang et al.	Cenomanian	Burmese amber	Myanmar	A wasp belonging to the family Aptenoperissidae.	
Aptenoperissus magnifemoris	Sp. nov	Valid	Rasnitsyn & Öhm-Kühnle	Late Cretaceous (Cenomanian)	Burmese amber	Myanmar	A wasp belonging to the family Aptenoperissidae.	
Aptenoperissus pusillus	Sp. nov	Valid	Rasnitsyn & Öhm-Kühnle	Late Cretaceous (Cenomanian)	Burmese amber	Myanmar	A wasp belonging to the family Aptenoperissidae.	
Aptenoperissus zonalis	Sp. nov	Valid	Zhang & Rasnitsyn in Zhang, Rasnitsyn & Zhang	Cenomanian	Burmese amber	Myanmar	A wasp belonging to the family Aptenoperissidae.	
Archaeocercus	Gen. et sp. nov	Valid	Simutnik & Perkovsky	Late Eocene	Rovno amber	Ukraine	A member of the family Encyrtidae. Genus includes new species A. schuvachinae.	
Auricleptes	Gen. et sp. nov	Valid	Lucena & Melo	Late Cretaceous (Cenomanian)	Burmese amber	Myanmar	A cuckoo wasp. Genus includes new species A. nebulosus.	
Azanichrum	Gen. et sp. nov	Valid	Lucena & Melo	Late Cretaceous (Cenomanian)	Burmese amber	Myanmar	A cuckoo wasp. Genus includes new species A. pilosum.	
Baeomorpha avamica	Sp. nov	Valid	Gumovsky in Gumovsky, Perkovsky & Rasnitsyn	Late Cretaceous (late Santonian)	Kheta Formation (Taimyr amber)	Russia	A member of the family Rotoitidae.	
Baeomorpha baikurenis	Sp. nov	Valid	Gumovsky in Gumovsky, Perkovsky & Rasnitsyn	Cretaceous (late Albian–?early Cenomanian)	Ognevka Formation? (Taimyr amber)	Russia	A member of the family Rotoitidae.	
Baeomorpha bianellus	Sp. nov	Valid	Gumovsky in Gumovsky, Perkovsky & Rasnitsyn	Late Cretaceous (late Santonian)	Kheta Formation (Taimyr amber)	Russia	A member of the family Rotoitidae.	
Baeomorpha caeleps	Sp. nov	Valid	Gumovsky in Gumovsky, Perkovsky & Rasnitsyn	Late Cretaceous (late Santonian)	Kheta Formation (Taimyr amber)	Russia	A member of the family Rotoitidae.	
Baeomorpha gracilis	Sp. nov	Valid	Gumovsky in Gumovsky, Perkovsky & Rasnitsyn	Late Cretaceous (late Santonian)	Kheta Formation (Taimyr amber)	Russia	A member of the family Rotoitidae.	
Baeomorpha ingens	Sp. nov	Valid	Gumovsky in Gumovsky, Perkovsky & Rasnitsyn	Late Cretaceous (late Santonian)	Kheta Formation (Taimyr amber)	Russia	A member of the family Rotoitidae.	
Baeomorpha popovi	Sp. nov	Valid	Gumovsky in Gumovsky, Perkovsky & Rasnitsyn	Late Cretaceous (late Santonian)	Kheta Formation (Taimyr amber)	Russia	A member of the family Rotoitidae.	
Baeomorpha quattorduo	Sp. nov	Valid	Gumovsky in Gumovsky, Perkovsky & Rasnitsyn	Late Cretaceous (late Santonian)	Kheta Formation (Taimyr amber)	Russia	A member of the family Rotoitidae.	
Baeomorpha quattoruno	Sp. nov	Valid	Gumovsky in Gumovsky, Perkovsky & Rasnitsyn	Late Cretaceous (late Santonian)	Kheta Formation (Taimyr amber)	Russia	A member of the family Rotoitidae.	
Baeomorpha yantardakh	Sp. nov	Valid	Gumovsky in Gumovsky, Perkovsky & Rasnitsyn	Late Cretaceous (late Santonian)	Kheta Formation (Taimyr amber)	Russia	A member of the family Rotoitidae.	
Baeomorpha zherikhini	Sp. nov	Valid	Gumovsky in Gumovsky, Perkovsky & Rasnitsyn	Cretaceous (late Albian–?early Cenomanian)	Ognevka Formation? (Taimyr amber)	Russia	A member of the family Rotoitidae.	
Bohartiura	Gen. et sp. nov	Valid	Lucena & Melo	Late Cretaceous (Cenomanian)	Burmese amber	Myanmar	A cuckoo wasp. Genus includes new species B. glabrata.	
Brachysyntexis tenebrosa	Sp. nov	Valid	Kopylov	Middle–Late Jurassic		Kazakhstan	A member of the family Anaxyelidae.	
Brachysyntexis tigris	Sp. nov	Valid	Kopylov	Middle–Late Jurassic		Kazakhstan	A member of the family Anaxyelidae.	
Burmasega	Gen. et sp. nov	Valid	Lucena & Melo	Late Cretaceous (Cenomanian)	Burmese amber	Myanmar	A cuckoo wasp. Genus includes new species B. ammirabilis.	
Burmasphex	Gen. et 2 sp. nov	Valid	Melo & Rosa	Late Cretaceous (Cenomanian)	Burmese amber	Myanmar	A member of Apoidea belonging to the family Angarosphecidae. The type species is B. sulcatus; genus also includes B. pilosus.	
Burminata	Gen. et sp. nov	Valid	Haas, Burks & Krogmann	Late Cretaceous (Cenomanian)	Burmese amber	Myanmar	A chalcid wasp belonging to the new family Diversinitidae. The type species is B. caputaeria.	
Burmusculus	Gen. et 3 sp. nov	Valid	Zhang & Rasnitsyn in Zhang, Rasnitsyn & Zhang	Late Cretaceous (Cenomanian)	Burmese amber	Myanmar	A wasp belonging to the group Pompiloidea. Genus includes new species B. nuwae, B. fuxii and B. shennongii.	
Carinibus	Gen. et sp. nov	Valid	Spasojevic et al.	Early Eocene	Green River Formation	United States	A member of the family Ichneumonidae. The type species is C. molestus.	
Chifengilyda	Gen. et sp. nov	Valid	Zheng & Chen	Early Cretaceous	Yixian Formation	China	A sawfly belonging to the family Xyelydidae. Genus includes new species C. robusta.	
Colmepsiterona	Gen. et sp. nov	Valid	Cockx & McKellar	Late Cretaceous (Cenomanian)	Burmese amber	Myanmar	A wasp belonging to the family Crabronidae and the subfamily Pemphredoninae. Genus includes new species C. cumcarena.	
Conostigmus talamasi	Sp. nov	Valid	Mikó & Trietsch in Mikó et al.	Eocene	Baltic amber	Europe (Gdańsk Bay)	A species of Conostigmus.	
Coptera anka	Sp. nov	Valid	Krogmann, van de Kamp & Schwermann in van de Kamp et al.	Paleogene	Quercy Phosphorites Formation	France	A member of the family Diapriidae.	
Cretevania tenuis	Sp. nov	Valid	Li et al.	Late Cretaceous (Cenomanian)	Burmese amber	Myanmar	A member of Evanioidea.	
Cretevania venae	Sp. nov	Valid	Li et al.	Early Cretaceous	Yixian Formation	China	A member of Evanioidea.	
Cretosirex	Gen. et sp. nov	Valid	Wang et al.	Early Cretaceous	Yixian Formation	China	A horntail. Genus includes new species C. xiaoi.	
Crusopimpla	Gen. et sp. nov	Valid	Kopylov, Spasojevic & Klopfstein	Early Eocene	Tadushi Formation	Russia	A member of the family Ichneumonidae. Genus includes new species C. tadushensis.	
Curtevania	Gen. et sp. nov	Valid	Li et al.	Late Cretaceous (Cenomanian)	Burmese amber	Myanmar	A member of Evanioidea. Genus includes new species C. enervia.	
Dencyrtus	Gen. et sp. nov	Valid	Simutnik & Perkovsky	Late Eocene	Danish amber	Denmark	A member of the family Encyrtidae. Genus includes new species D. vilhelmseni.	
Dolichomitus? saxeus	Sp. nov	Valid	Kopylov, Spasojevic & Klopfstein	Early Eocene	Tadushi Formation	Russia	Possibly a species of Dolichomitus.	
Dryinus maderai	Sp. nov	Valid	Guglielmino et al.	Cenomanian	Burmese amber	Myanmar	A member of the family Dryinidae.	Dryinus maderai
Diversinitus	Gen. et sp. nov	Valid	Haas, Burks & Krogmann	Late Cretaceous (Cenomanian)	Burmese amber	Myanmar	A chalcid wasp belonging to the new family Diversinitidae. The type species is D. attenboroughi.	Diversinitus attenboroughi
Electromyrmex wheeleri	Sp. nov	Valid	Radchenko & Dlussky	Late Eocene	Baltic amber Bitterfeld amber	Baltic Sea region Germany		
Epyris moulyi	Sp. nov	Valid	Falières & Nel	Early Eocene	Oise amber	France	A species of Epyris.	
Epyris neolongiceps	Nom. nov	Valid	Azevedo in Azevedo et al.	Oligocene	Baltic amber	Europe (Baltic Sea region)	A species of Epyris; a replacement name for Calyoza longiceps Brues (1923).	
Eupsenella neoeocenica	Nom. nov	Valid	Ramos & Azevedo in Azevedo et al.	Eocene	Fushun amber	China	A member of the family Bethylidae; a replacement name for Fushunochrysites eocenicus Hong (2002).	
Eupsenella neohongi	Nom. nov	Valid	Ramos & Azevedo in Azevedo et al.	Eocene	Fushun amber	China	A member of the family Bethylidae; a replacement name for Sinibethylus eocenicus Hong (2002).	
Exilaulacus	Gen. et 2 sp. nov	Valid	Li et al.	Late Cretaceous (Cenomanian)	Burmese amber	Myanmar	A member of Evanioidea. Genus includes new species E. loculatus and E. latus.	
Fallomyrma anodonta	Sp. nov	Valid	Radchenko & Dlussky	Late Eocene	Rovno amber	Ukraine	An ant belonging to the subfamily Myrmicinae.	
Fallomyrma marginata	Sp. nov	Valid	Radchenko & Dlussky	Late Eocene	Rovno amber	Ukraine	An ant belonging to the subfamily Myrmicinae.	
Fallomyrma robusta	Sp. nov	Valid	Radchenko & Dlussky	Late Eocene	Rovno amber	Ukraine	An ant belonging to the subfamily Myrmicinae.	
Glabiala	Gen. et sp. nov	Valid	Haas, Burks & Krogmann	Late Cretaceous (Cenomanian)	Burmese amber	Myanmar	A chalcid wasp belonging to the new family Diversinitidae. The type species is G. barbata.	
Heterobaissa	Gen. et sp. nov	Valid	Li et al.	Early Cretaceous	Yixian Formation	China	A member of Evanioidea. Genus includes new species H. apetiola.	
Ichninsum	Gen. et sp. nov	Valid	Spasojevic et al.	Early Eocene	Green River Formation	United States	A pimpline Ichneumonidae. The type species is I. appendicrassum.	
Kulbastavia grandis	Sp. nov	Valid	Kopylov	Middle–Late Jurassic		Kazakhstan	A member of the family Anaxyelidae.	
Mesoclistus? yamataroti	Sp. nov	Valid	Spasojevic et al.	Early Eocene	Green River Formation	United States	A possible Coleocentrini tribe acaenitine darwin wasp.	
Mesornatus	Gen. et sp. nov	Valid	Spasojevic, Wedmann & Klopfstein	Eocene	Messel pit	Germany	A member of the family Ichneumonidae of uncertain phylogenetic placement. The type species is M. markovici.	
Miracorium	Gen. et sp. nov	Valid	Lucena & Melo	Late Cretaceous (Cenomanian)	Burmese amber	Myanmar	A cuckoo wasp. Genus includes new species M. tetrafoveolatum.	
Myanmarina	Gen. et 4 sp. nov	Valid	Zhang & Rasnitsyn in Zhang et al.	Cenomanian	Burmese amber	Myanmar	A member of Apocrita belonging to the superfamily Stephanoidea. The type species is M. lisu; genus also includes new species M. kachin, M. lahu and M. jeannineae Li et al. (2018).	
Napakimyrma	Gen. et sp. nov	Valid	Lapolla & Barden	Paleocene	Paskapoo Formation	Canada	An ant belonging to the subfamily Aneuretinae. The type species is N. paskapooensis.	
Newjersevania brevis	Sp. nov	Valid	Li et al.	Late Cretaceous (Cenomanian)	Burmese amber	Myanmar	A member of Evanioidea.	
Newjersevania longa	Sp. nov	Valid	Li et al.	Late Cretaceous (Cenomanian)	Burmese amber	Myanmar	A member of Evanioidea.	
Palaeortona	Gen. et sp. nov	Valid	Krogmann, van de Kamp & Schwermann in van de Kamp et al.	Paleogene	Quercy Phosphorites Formation	France	A member of the family Diapriidae. The type species is P. quercyensis.	
Parevania oculiseparata	Sp. nov	Valid	Jennings et al.	Eocene	Baltic amber	Europe	A member of the family Evaniidae.	
Peleproctus	Gen. et sp. nov	Valid	Zhang et al.	Late Cretaceous (Cenomanian)	Burmese amber	Myanmar	A basal member of Proctotrupomorpha. Genus includes new species P. dolichurus.	
Peleserphus	Gen. et 2 sp. nov	Valid	Zhang et al.	Late Cretaceous (Cenomanian)	Burmese amber	Myanmar	A basal member of Proctotrupomorpha. The type species is P. brachyurus; genus also includes P. genalis.	
Phanerotomella brevivena	Sp. nov	Valid	Kittel	Eocene	Baltic amber	Europe (Baltic Sea region)	A member of the family Braconidae belonging to the subfamily Cheloninae.	
Polyhelictes	Gen. et sp. nov	Valid	Spasojevic, Wedmann & Klopfstein	Eocene	Messel pit	Germany	A member of the family Ichneumonidae of uncertain phylogenetic placement. The type species is P. bipolarus.	
Praeaulacus rectus	Sp. nov	Valid	Li et al.	Middle Jurassic	Jiulongshan Formation	China	A member of Evanioidea.	
Pristomyrmex archaios	Sp. nov	Valid	Radchenko & Dlussky	Eocene	Bitterfeld amber	Germany	An ant, a species of Pristomyrmex.	
Pristomyrmex elmesi	Sp. nov	Valid	Radchenko & Dlussky	Eocene	Rovno amber	Ukraine	An ant, a species of Pristomyrmex.	
Proleptothorax	Gen. et sp. nov	Valid	Radchenko, Dlussky & Perfilieva	Late Eocene	Rovno amber	Ukraine	An ant. Genus includes new species P. primitivus.	
Rhyssella vera	Sp. nov	Valid	Spasojevic, Wedmann & Klopfstein	Eocene	Messel pit	Germany	A member of the family Ichneumonidae, a species of Rhyssella.	
Scambus fossilobus	Sp. nov	Valid	Spasojevic, Wedmann & Klopfstein	Eocene	Messel pit	Germany	A member of the family Ichneumonidae, a species of Scambus.	
Scambus? mandibularis	Sp. nov	Valid	Spasojevic et al.	Early Eocene	Green River Formation	United States	A possible Ephialtini tribe pimpline darwin wasp.	
Scambus? parachuti	Sp. nov	Valid	Spasojevic et al.	Early Eocene	Green River Formation	United States	A possible Ephialtini tribe pimpline darwin wasp.	
Seneciobracon	Gen. et sp. nov	Valid	Engel & Huang in Engel et al.	Late Cretaceous (Cenomanian)	Burmese amber	Myanmar	A member of the family Braconidae. The type species is S. novalatus.	Seneciobracon novalatus
Sinuevania	Gen. et sp. nov	Valid	Li et al.	Late Cretaceous (Cenomanian)	Burmese amber	Myanmar	A member of Evanioidea. Genus includes new species S. mira.	
Taimyromorpha	Gen. et sp. nov	Valid	Gumovsky in Gumovsky, Perkovsky & Rasnitsyn	Late Cretaceous (late Santonian)	Kheta Formation (Taimyr amber)	Russia	A member of the family Rotoitidae. Genus includes new species T. pusilla.	
Trigonator	Gen. et sp. nov	Valid	Spasojevic, Wedmann & Klopfstein	Eocene	Messel pit	Germany	A member of the family Ichneumonidae belonging to the subfamily Labeninae. The type species is T. macrocheirus.	
Trjapitzion	Gen. et sp. nov	Valid	Simutnik in Simutnik & Perkovsky	Late Eocene	Rovno amber	Ukraine	A member of the family Encyrtidae. Genus includes new species T. cylindrocerus.	
Trymectus	Gen. et comb. nov	Valid	Spasojevic et al.	Early Eocene	Green River Formation	United States	A darwin wasp of uncertain subfamily placement. The type species is Tryphon amasidis (1931).	
Versolabrum	Gen. et sp. nov	Valid	Burks & Krogmann in Burks, Krogmann & Heraty	Eocene	Baltic amber	Europe (Baltic Sea region)	A member of the family Pteromalidae. Genus includes new species V. coriaceum.	
Vitimosphex vividus	Sp. nov	Valid	Zhang, Rasnitsyn & Zhang	Early Cretaceous	Yixian Formation	China	A member of Apoidea belonging to the family Angarosphecidae.	
Xanthopimpla messelensis	Sp. nov	Valid	Spasojevic, Wedmann & Klopfstein	Eocene	Messel pit	Germany	A member of the family Ichneumonidae belonging to the subfamily Pimplinae and the tribe Pimplini.	Xanthopimpla messelensis
Xanthopimpla praeclara	Sp. nov	Valid	Spasojevic, Wedmann & Klopfstein	Eocene	Messel pit	Germany	A member of the family Ichneumonidae belonging to the subfamily Pimplinae and the tribe Pimplini.	
Xenomorphia	Gen. et 2 sp. nov	Valid	Krogmann, van de Kamp & Schwermann in van de Kamp et al.	Paleogene	Quercy Phosphorites Formation	France	A member of the family Diapriidae. The type species is X. resurrecta; genus also includes X. handschini.	Xenomorphia resurrecta

=== Mecopterans ===
Name	Novelty	Status	Authors	Age	Unit	Type Location	Notes	Images
Bittacus lepiduscretaceus	Sp. nov	Valid	Li et al.	Late Cretaceous (Cenomanian)	Burmese amber	Myanmar	A hangingfly, a species of Bittacus.	
Eomerope eonearctica	Sp. nov	Valid	Archibald & Rasnitsyn	Eocene (Ypresian)		Canada	A member of the family Eomeropidae.	
Eomerope simpkinsae	Sp. nov	Valid	Archibald & Rasnitsyn	Eocene (Ypresian)	Allenby Formation	Canada	A member of the family Eomeropidae.	
Gigaphlebia	Gen. et comb. nov	Valid	Soszyńska-Maj et al.	Jurassic	Dzil Formation; Jiulongshan Formation; Karabastau Svita	China; Kazakhstan; Kyrgyzstan	A member of the family Orthophlebiidae. Genus includes "Orthophlebia" riccardii Petrulevičius & Ren (2012), "Orthophlebia" grandis Martynov (1927) and "Mesopanorpa" palmaris Martynova (1948).	
Hongchoristites	Nom. nov	Valid	Hernández	Middle Triassic	Tongchuan Formation	China	A member of the family Permochoristidae; a replacement name for Choristites Hong (2005).	
Longiphlebia	Gen. et comb. nov	Valid	Soszyńska-Maj et al.	Middle Jurassic	Jiulongshan Formation	China	A member of the family Orthophlebiidae. Genus includes "Orthophlebia" stigmosa Qiao, Shih & Ren (2012).	
Mesopanorpa brooksorum	Sp. nov	Valid	Jarzembowski & Soszyńska-Maj	Early Cretaceous	Wealden Supergroup	United Kingdom	A member of the family Orthophlebiidae.	
Orthobittacus suni	Sp. nov	Valid	Kopeć et al.	Middle Jurassic		China	A hangingfly.	
Worcestobia	Gen. et comb. nov	Valid	Soszyńska-Maj et al.	Triassic		Japan; United Kingdom	A new genus for "Orthophlebia" gigantea Tillyard (1933) and "O." haradai Ueda (1991).	

=== Neuropterans ===
Name	Novelty	Status	Authors	Age	Unit	Type Location	Notes	Images
Aberrantochrysa	Gen. et 2 sp. nov	Valid	Khramov	Early Cretaceous		Russia	A green lacewing. Genus includes new species A. buryatica and A. pulchella.	
Acanthopsychops	Gen. et sp. nov	Valid	Badano & Engel in Badano et al.	Late Cretaceous (Cenomanian)	Burmese amber	Myanmar	A member of the family Psychopsidae. The type species is A. triaina.	Acanthopsychops triaina
Adelpholeon	Gen. et sp. nov	Valid	Badano & Engel in Badano et al.	Late Cretaceous (Cenomanian)	Burmese amber	Myanmar	A relative of antlions and owlflies. The type species is A. lithophorus.	Adelpholeon lithophorus
Aphthartopsychops	Gen. et sp. nov	Valid	Badano & Engel in Badano et al.	Late Cretaceous (Cenomanian)	Burmese amber	Myanmar	A member of the family Psychopsidae. The type species is A. scutatus.	Aphthartopsychops scutatus
Burmitus	Gen. et sp. nov	Valid	Badano, Engel & Wang in Badano et al.	Late Cretaceous (Cenomanian)	Burmese amber	Myanmar	A relative of antlions and owlflies. The type species is B. tubulifer.	Burmitus tubulifer
Burmogramma	Gen. et sp. nov	Valid	Liu et al.	Late Cretaceous (Cenomanian)	Burmese amber	Myanmar	A member of the family Kalligrammatidae belonging to the subfamily Cretanallachiinae. The type species is B. liui.	Burmogramma liui
Burmopsychops labandeirai	Sp. nov	Valid	Liu et al.	Late Cretaceous (Cenomanian)	Burmese amber	Myanmar	A member of the family Kalligrammatidae belonging to the subfamily Cretanallachiinae.	Burmopsychops labandeirai
Caririneura macrothoracica	Sp. nov	Valid	Makarkin, Wedmann & Heads	Early Cretaceous	Crato Formation	Brazil	A member of Myrmeleontoidea belonging to the family Araripeneuridae.	
Chorilingia bakharica	Sp. nov	Valid	Khramov & Vasilenko	Jurassic		Mongolia	A member of the family Grammolingiidae.	
Cladofer	Gen. et sp. nov	Valid	Badano, Engel & Wang in Badano et al.	Late Cretaceous (Cenomanian)	Burmese amber	Myanmar	A member of the stem group of Myrmeleontiformia. The type species is C. huangi.	Cladofer huangi
Cratoneura minor	Sp. nov	Valid	Makarkin, Wedmann & Heads	Early Cretaceous	Crato Formation	Brazil	A member of Myrmeleontoidea belonging to the family Araripeneuridae.	
Cretogramma	Gen. et sp. nov	Valid	Liu et al.	Late Cretaceous (Cenomanian)	Burmese amber	Myanmar	A member of the family Kalligrammatidae belonging to the subfamily Cretanallachiinae. The type species is C. engeli.	Cretogramma engeli
Diodontognathus	Gen. et sp. nov	Valid	Badano, Engel & Wang in Badano et al.	Late Cretaceous (Cenomanian)	Burmese amber	Myanmar	A relative of antlions and owlflies. The type species is D. papillatus.	Diodontognathus papillatus
Electrocaptivus	Gen. et sp. nov	Valid	Badano, Engel & Wang in Badano et al.	Late Cretaceous (Cenomanian)	Burmese amber	Myanmar	A relative of antlions and owlflies. The type species is E. xui.	Electrocaptivus xui
Haploberotha carsteni	Sp. nov	Valid	Makarkin	Late Cretaceous (Cenomanian)	Burmese amber	Myanmar	A member of the family Berothidae.	
Kujiberotha	Gen. et sp. nov	Valid	Nakamine & Yamamoto	Late Cretaceous (Santonian)	Tamagawa Formation (Kuji amber)	Japan	A thorny lacewing. The type species is K. teruyukii.	Kujiberotha teruyukii
Laccosmylus cicatricatus	Sp. nov	Valid	Fang et al.	Middle Jurassic (Bathonian-Callovian boundary)	Jiulongshan Formation	China	A member of the family Saucrosmylidae.	
Laccosmylus latizonus	Sp. nov	Valid	Fang et al.	Middle Jurassic (Bathonian-Callovian boundary)	Jiulongshan Formation	China	A member of the family Saucrosmylidae.	
Longipronotum	Gen. et sp. nov	Valid	Jepson, Khramov & Ohl	Late Jurassic		Kazakhstan	A member of the family Mantispidae. Genus includes new species L. benmaddoxi. The original generic name, Longicollum, turned out to be preoccupied by Longicollum Yamaguti (1935), necessitating creation of a replacement name.	
Macleodiella	Gen. et sp. nov	Valid	Badano & Engel in Badano et al.	Late Cretaceous (Cenomanian)	Burmese amber	Myanmar	A member of the stem group of Myrmeleontiformia. The type species is M. electrina.	Macleodiella electrina
Mesoptynx	Gen. et sp. nov	Valid	Badano, Engel & Wang in Badano et al.	Late Cretaceous (Cenomanian)	Burmese amber	Myanmar	A relative of antlions and owlflies. The type species is M. unguiculatus.	Mesoptynx unguiculatus
Mesypochrysa cannabina	Sp. nov	Valid	Khramov	Early Cretaceous		Russia	A green lacewing.	
Mesypochrysa naranica	Sp. nov	Valid	Khramov	Early Cretaceous		Russia	A green lacewing.	
Nilionympha shantouensis	Sp. nov	Valid	Li, Ren & Wang	Middle Jurassic	Jiulongshan Formation	China	A member of the family Osmylidae.	
Nymphavus	Gen. et sp. nov	Valid	Badano, Engel & Wang in Badano et al.	Late Cretaceous (Cenomanian)	Burmese amber	Myanmar	A member of the family Nymphidae. The type species is N. progenitor.	Nymphavus progenitor
Oligopsychopsis	Gen. et 2 sp. et comb. nov	Valid	Chang et al.	Late Cretaceous (Cenomanian)	Burmese amber	Myanmar	A member of Psychopsoidea, possibly belonging to the family Kalligrammatidae. Genus includes new species O. penniformis Chang et al. (2018) and O. grandis Liu et al. (2018), as well as "Burmopsychops" groehni Makarkin (2017).	Oligopsychopsis grandis
Opapanfilovia	Gen. et sp. nov	Valid	Khramov & Vasilenko	Jurassic		Kyrgyzstan	A member of the family Panfiloviidae. Genus includes new species O. bonata.	
Ovalofemora	Gen. et sp. et comb. nov	Valid	Jepson, Khramov & Ohl	Late Jurassic		Kazakhstan	A member of the family Mantispidae. Genus includes new species O. abbottae, as well as "Mesithone" monstruosa Khramov (2013).	
Parababinskaia makarkini	Sp. nov	Valid	Hu et al.	Late Cretaceous (Cenomanian)	Burmese amber	Myanmar	A member of Myrmeleontoidea belonging to the family Babinskaiidae.	Parababinskaia makarkini
Parabaisochrysa	Gen. et sp. nov	Valid	Lu et al.	Late Cretaceous (Cenomanian)	Burmese amber	Myanmar	A green lacewing. Genus includes new species P. xingkei.	Parabaisochrysa xingkei
Phyllochrysa	Gen. et sp. nov	Valid	Liu et al.	Late Cretaceous (Cenomanian)	Burmese amber	Myanmar	A member of Chrysopoidea. The type species is P. huangi.	
Pristinofossor	Gen. et sp. nov	Valid	Badano & Engel in Badano et al.	Late Cretaceous (Cenomanian)	Burmese amber	Myanmar	A stem-antlion. The type species is P. rictus.	Pristinofossor rictus
Pseudosencera	Gen. et sp. nov	Valid	Makarkin, Wedmann & Weiterschan	Late Eocene	Baltic amber	Europe (Baltic Sea coast)	A green lacewing. The type species is P. baltica.	
Stictosisyra	Gen. et sp. nov	Valid	Yang et al.	Late Cretaceous (Cenomanian)	Burmese amber	Myanmar	A member of the family Sisyridae. The type species is S. pennyi.	Stictosisyra pennyi
Tragichrysa	Gen. et sp. nov	Valid	Pérez-de la Fuente et al.	Early Cretaceous (early Barremian)	Lebanese amber	Lebanon	A member of Chrysopoidea of uncertain phylogenetic placement. The type species is T. ovoruptora.	Tragichrysa ovoruptora
Tyruschrysa	Gen. et sp. nov	Valid	Pérez-de la Fuente et al.	Early Cretaceous (Barremian)	Lebanese amber	Lebanon	A member of the superfamily Chrysopoidea. The type species is T. melqart.	Tyruschrysa melqart
Wesmaelius makarkini	Sp. nov	Valid	Yang, Pang & Ren in Yang et al.	Early Miocene	Garang Formation	China	A brown lacewing belonging to the subfamily Hemerobiinae.	

=== Odonatans ===
Name	Novelty	Status	Authors	Age	Unit	Type Location	Notes	Images
Anglophlebia	Gen. et comb. nov	Valid	Kelly & Nel	Early Jurassic (Sinemurian)	Charmouth Mudstone Formation	United Kingdom	A member of Epiprocta belonging to the superfamily Heterophlebioidea and to the family Anglophlebiidae. The type species is "Liassophlebia" gigantea Zeuner (1962).	
Araripegomphus shai	Sp. nov	Valid	Zheng et al.	Late Cretaceous (Cenomanian)	Burmese amber	Myanmar	A dragonfly.	
Burmahemiphlebia hui	Sp. nov	Valid	Zheng & Wang	Late Cretaceous (Cenomanian)	Burmese amber	Myanmar	A damselfly belonging to the family Hemiphlebiidae.	
Cretamegaloprepus	Gen. et sp. nov	Valid	Zheng, Nel & Wang in Zheng et al.	Late Cretaceous (Cenomanian)	Burmese amber	Myanmar	A damselfly. Genus includes new species C. zhouae.	
Cretapodagrion	Gen. et sp. nov	Valid	Huang, Azar & Nel	Early Cretaceous (Barremian – Aptian)	Yixian Formation	China	A damselfly. Genus includes new species C. sibelleae.	
Cretastenophlebia jiuquanensis	Sp. nov	Valid	Zheng et al.	Early Cretaceous (Lower Albian)	Zhonggou Formation	China	A member of the family Stenophlebiidae.	
Cymatophlebia yixianensis	Sp. nov	Valid	Zheng et al.	Early Cretaceous	Yixian Formation	China	A dragonfly belonging to the family Cymatophlebiidae.	
Erpetogomphus shii	Sp. nov	Valid	Zheng et al.	Early Miocene	La Quinta Formation (Mexican amber)	Mexico	A dragonfly, a species of Erpetogomphus.	
Honghea	Gen. et sp. nov	Valid	Zheng et al.	Early Jurassic	Badaowan Formation	China	A damsel-dragonfly belonging to the family Campterophlebiidae. Genus includes new species H. xui.	
Jurathemis	Gen. et sp. nov	Valid	Huang et al.	Late Jurassic (Oxfordian)	Yangshuzhuang Formation	China	A damsel-dragonfly belonging to the group Isophlebioptera and the family Selenothemistidae. The type species is J. incompletus.	
Lateophlebia	Gen. et comb. nov	Valid	Kelly & Nel	Early Jurassic (Sinemurian)		United Kingdom	A damsel-dragonfly belonging to the family Campterophlebiidae. The type species is "Petrophlebia" anglicanopsis Zeuner (1962).	
Madres	Gen. et sp. nov	Valid	Petrulevičius	Eocene (Lutetian)		Argentina	A damselfly belonging to the family Synlestidae. The type species is M. delpueblo.	
Paraburmagomphides	Gen. et sp. nov	Valid	Zheng et al.	Late Cretaceous (Cenomanian)	Burmese amber	Myanmar	A dragonfly. Genus includes new species P. zhaoi.	
Paracoryphagrion	Gen. et sp. nov	Valid	Zheng, Nel & Wang in Zheng et al.	Cenomanian	Burmese amber	Myanmar	A damselfly belonging to the group Pseudostigmatoidea. Genus includes new species P. deltoides.	
Paradecoraeshna	Gen. et sp. nov	Valid	Zheng, Nel & Zhang in Zheng et al.	Early Cretaceous (Aptian)	Yixian Formation	China	A dragonfly belonging to the family Progobiaeshnidae. Genus includes new species P. liaoningensis.	
Parazygokaratawia	Gen. et sp. nov	Valid	Huang, Cai & Nel	Middle Jurassic	Daohugou Beds	China	A damsel-dragonfly belonging to the family Campterophlebiidae. Genus includes new species P. azari.	
Proinogomphus kreuzerorum	Sp. nov	Valid	Bechly	Early Jurassic		Luxembourg	A dragonfly belonging to the family Liassogomphidae.	
Rossiphlebia	Gen. et comb. nov	Valid	Kelly & Nel	Early Jurassic (Sinemurian)	Charmouth Mudstone Formation	United Kingdom	A member of Epiprocta belonging to the superfamily Heterophlebioidea and to the family Liassophlebiidae. The type species is "Liassophlebia" jacksoni Zeuner (1962).	
Sinothemis	Gen. et sp. nov	Valid	Huang, Cai & Nel	Late Jurassic (late Oxfordian or early Kimmeridgian)	Tiaojishan Formation	China	A damsel-dragonfly belonging to the group Isophlebioptera and the family Selenothemistidae. Genus includes new species S. difficilis.	
Thairia	Gen. et sp. nov	Valid	Felker & Vasilenko	Early Cretaceous		Russia	A damselfly belonging to the family Ponomarenkiidae. Genus includes new species T. transbaikalica.	
Valdaeshna mikei	Sp. nov	Valid	Zheng et al.	Early Cretaceous	Upper Weald Clay	United Kingdom	A dragonfly belonging to the family Cymatophlebiidae.	
Zygokaratawia incompleta	Sp. nov	Valid	Huang, Cai & Nel	Middle Jurassic	Daohugou Beds	China	A damsel-dragonfly belonging to the family Campterophlebiidae.	

=== Orthopterans ===
Name	Novelty	Status	Authors	Age	Unit	Type Location	Notes	Images
Cascadelcana	Gen. et sp. nov	Valid	Fang et al.	Late Triassic (Norian)	Cow Branch Formation	United States	A member of the family Elcanidae. Genus includes new species C. virginiana.	
Cascogryllus	Gen. et sp. nov	Valid	Poinar	Late Cretaceous (Cenomanian)	Burmese amber	Myanmar	A member of the family Tridactylidae. Genus includes new species C. lobiferus.	
Elcanonympha	Gen. et sp. nov	Valid	Heads, Thomas & Wang	Late Cretaceous (Cenomanian)	Burmese amber	Myanmar	A member of the family Elcanidae. Genus includes new species E. diana.	Elcanonympha diana
Ellipes dominicana	Sp. nov	Valid	Poinar	Eocene or Miocene	Dominican amber	Dominican Republic	A member of the family Tridactylidae.	
Jeholelcana	Gen. et sp. nov	Valid	Fang et al.	Early Cretaceous	Yixian Formation	China	A member of Orthoptera belonging to the family Elcanidae. Genus includes new species J. yanensis.	
Pseudaboilus ningchengensis	Sp. nov	Valid	Wang et al.	Early Cretaceous	Yixian Formation	China	A member of the family Prophalangopsidae belonging to the subfamily Termitidiinae.	
Sigmaboilus calophlebius	Sp. nov	Valid	Wang et al.	Middle–Late Jurassic	Daohugou Beds	China	An orthopteran belonging to the family Prophalangopsidae.	

=== Plecopterans ===
Name	Novelty	Status	Authors	Age	Unit	Type Location	Notes	Images
Balticopteryx	Gen. et sp. nov	Valid	Chen	Eocene	Baltic amber	Europe (Baltic Sea region)	A member of the family Taeniopterygidae. Genus includes new species B. dui.	
Baltileuctra	Gen. et sp. nov	Valid	Chen	Eocene	Baltic amber	Europe (Baltic Sea coast)	A member of Plecoptera belonging to the family Leuctridae. Genus includes new species B. foraminis.	
Boreoperlidium callopterus	Sp. nov	Valid	Sinitshenkova	Middle Permian		Russia	A member of the family Eustheniidae.	
Boreoperlidium certus	Sp. nov	Valid	Sinitshenkova	Middle Permian		Russia	A member of the family Eustheniidae.	
Boreoperlidium ramificans	Sp. nov	Valid	Sinitshenkova	Middle Permian		Russia	A member of the family Eustheniidae.	
Electroneuria	Gen. et sp. nov	Valid	Sroka, Staniczek & Kondratieff	Late Cretaceous (Cenomanian)	Burmese amber	Myanmar	A member of Plecoptera belonging to the family Perlidae. The type species is E. ronwoodi.	Electroneuria ronwoodi
Euroleuctra	Gen. et sp. nov	Valid	Chen	Eocene	Baltic amber	Poland	A member of Plecoptera belonging to the family Leuctridae. Genus includes new species E. gillesi.	
Kargaloperla fibrosa	Sp. nov	Valid	Sinitshenkova	Middle Permian		Russia	A member of the family Palaeoperlidae.	
Kargaloperla gratum	Sp. nov	Valid	Sinitshenkova	Middle Permian		Russia	A member of the family Palaeoperlidae.	
Kargaloperla postica	Sp. nov	Valid	Sinitshenkova	Middle Permian		Russia	A member of the family Palaeoperlidae.	
Kargaloperla queata	Sp. nov	Valid	Sinitshenkova	Middle Permian		Russia	A member of the family Palaeoperlidae.	
Lapisperla	Gen. et sp. nov	Valid	Sroka, Staniczek & Kondratieff	Late Cretaceous (Cenomanian)	Burmese amber	Myanmar	A member of Plecoptera belonging to the group Arctoperlaria, assigned to the new family Petroperlidae. The type species is L. keithrichardsi.	Lapisperla keithrichardsi
Largusoperla	Gen. et 11 sp. nov	Valid	Chen, Wang & Du	Late Cretaceous (Cenomanian)	Burmese amber	Myanmar	A member of Plecoptera belonging to the family Perlidae. Genus includes new species L. acus Chen, Wang & Du (2018), L. arcus Chen, Wang & Du (2018), L. flata Chen, Wang & Du (2018), L. difformitatem Chen (2018), L. dewalti Chen (2018), L. borisi Chen (2018), L. charliewattsi Sroka, Staniczek & Staniczek (2018), L. brianjonesi Sroka, Staniczek & Staniczek (2018), L. micktaylori Sroka, Staniczek & Staniczek (2018), L. billwymani Sroka, Staniczek & Staniczek (2018) and L. crassus Chen (2018).	Largusoperla billwymani
Palaeonemoura benevola	Sp. nov	Valid	Sinitshenkova	Middle Permian		Russia		
Palaeonemourisca corrugata	Sp. nov	Valid	Sinitshenkova	Middle Permian		Russia		
Palaeotaeniopteryx alligata	Sp. nov	Valid	Sinitshenkova	Middle Permian		Russia		
Palaeotaeniopteryx trinerva	Sp. nov	Valid	Sinitshenkova	Middle Permian		Russia		
Paranotonemoura	Gen. et sp. et comb. nov	Valid	Cui & Béthoux in Cui, Ren & Béthoux	Middle Jurassic	Jiulongshan Formation	China; Mongolia	A member of Plecoptera belonging to the family Notonemouridae. The type species is P. zwicki; genus also includes "Perlariopsis" fidelis Sinitshenkova (1987).	
Petroperla	Gen. et sp. nov	Valid	Sroka, Staniczek & Kondratieff	Late Cretaceous (Cenomanian)	Burmese amber	Myanmar	A member of Plecoptera belonging to the group Arctoperlaria, assigned to the new family Petroperlidae. The type species is P. mickjaggeri.	Petroperla mickjaggeri
Pinguisoperla	Gen. et sp. nov	Valid	Chen	Late Cretaceous (Cenomanian)	Burmese amber	Myanmar	A member of Plecoptera belonging to the family Perlidae. Genus includes new species P. yangzhouensis.	
Properla incrassata	Sp. nov	Valid	Sinitshenkova	Middle Permian		Russia	A member of the family Palaeoperlidae.	
Properla umbrosa	Sp. nov	Valid	Sinitshenkova	Middle Permian		Russia	A member of the family Palaeoperlidae.	
Votaknemoura persuasibil	Sp. nov	Valid	Sinitshenkova	Middle Permian		Russia		

=== Trichopterans ===
Name	Novelty	Status	Authors	Age	Unit	Type Location	Notes	Images
Anisocalamus	Gen. et sp. nov	Valid	Sukacheva & Vasilenko	Probably Early Cretaceous	Doronino Formation	Russia	A member of the family Calamoceratidae. Genus includes new species A. mixtus.	
Austaulius	Gen. et comb. et sp. nov	Valid	Kelly, Ross & Coram	Late Triassic (Rhaetian) and Early Jurassic (Hettangian and Sinemurian)	Penarth Group	United Kingdom	A member of the family Necrotauliidae. The type species is "Orthophlebia" furcata Giebel (1856); genus also includes new species A. haustrum.	
Burmapsyche	Gen. et 2 sp. nov	Valid	Wichard et al.	Late Cretaceous (Cenomanian)	Burmese amber	Myanmar	A member of Integripalpia belonging to the family Dysoneuridae. Genus includes new species B. comosa and B. palpsfurcata.	
Calamostavropolia	Gen. et sp. nov	Valid	Sukatsheva et al.	Middle Miocene		Russia	A member of the family Calamoceratidae. Genus includes new species C. revolutionaria.	
Cretaganonema	Gen. et sp. nov	Valid	Wichard, Espeland & Wang	Late Cretaceous (Cenomanian)	Burmese amber	Myanmar	A member of the family Calamoceratidae. The type species is C. dongi.	
Cretahelicopsyche	Gen. et sp. nov	Valid	Wichard, Espeland & Wang	Late Cretaceous (Cenomanian)	Burmese amber	Myanmar	A snail-case caddisfly. The type species is C. liuyani.	
Cretapsyche	Gen. et 3 sp. nov	Valid	Wichard et al.	Late Cretaceous (Cenomanian)	Burmese amber	Myanmar	A member of Integripalpia belonging to the family Dysoneuridae. Genus includes new species C. circula,C. elegans and C. insueta.	
Ecnomus cretacia	Sp. nov	Valid	Wichard & Azar	Early Cretaceous	Lebanese amber	Lebanon	A member of the family Ecnomidae.	
Electroadicella kuenowi	Sp. nov	Valid	Wichard, Neumann & Werneburg	Eocene	Baltic amber	Europe (Baltic Sea coast)	A member of the family Leptoceridae.	
Halesus miocenicus	Sp. nov	Valid	Sukatsheva et al.	Middle Miocene		Russia		
Kempia	Gen. et sp. nov	Junior homonym	Sukatcheva in Aristov & Sukatcheva	Late Jurassic–Early Cretaceous		Russia	A member of the family Philopotamidae. The type species is K. piotri. The generic name is preoccupied by Kempia Mathews (1912), Kempia Kieffer (1913) and Kempia Preston (1913).	
Limnephilus antiquastepposus	Sp. nov	Valid	Sukatsheva et al.	Middle Miocene		Russia	A species of Limnephilus.	
Limnephilus metakaspievi	Sp. nov	Valid	Sukatsheva et al.	Middle Miocene		Russia	A species of Limnephilus.	
Limnephilus parakaspievi	Sp. nov	Valid	Sukatsheva et al.	Middle Miocene		Russia	A species of Limnephilus.	
Limnephilus valliculacerasinus	Sp. nov	Valid	Sukatsheva et al.	Middle Miocene		Russia	A species of Limnephilus.	
Litholimnephilops	Gen. et sp. nov	Valid	Robinson, Thomas & Heads	Eocene (Ypresian)	Green River Formation	United States	A caddisfly of uncertain phylogenetic placement. Genus includes new species L. yinani.	
Mesoviatrix	Gen. et sp. nov	Valid	Sukatcheva in Aristov & Sukatcheva	Late Jurassic–Early Cretaceous		Russia	A member of the family Philopotamidae. The type species is M. paradoxa.	
Miocenocosmoecus	Gen. et sp. nov	Valid	Sukatsheva et al.	Middle Miocene		Russia	A member of the family Limnephilidae. Genus includes new species M. silvacaliginosus.	
Palaeorheithrus	Gen. et sp. nov	Valid	Sukacheva & Vasilenko	Probably Early Cretaceous	Doronino Formation	Russia	A member of the family Philorheithridae. Genus includes new species P. sibiricus.	
Palerasnitsynus furcatis	Sp. nov	Valid	Wichard, Müller & Wang	Late Cretaceous (Cenomanian)	Burmese amber	Myanmar	A member of the family Psychomyiidae.	
Palerasnitsynus gracilis	Sp. nov	Valid	Wichard, Müller & Wang	Late Cretaceous (Cenomanian)	Burmese amber	Myanmar	A member of the family Psychomyiidae.	
Palerasnitsynus lepidus	Sp. nov	Valid	Wichard, Müller & Wang	Late Cretaceous (Cenomanian)	Burmese amber	Myanmar	A member of the family Psychomyiidae.	
Palerasnitsynus spinosus	Sp. nov	Valid	Wichard, Müller & Wang	Late Cretaceous (Cenomanian)	Burmese amber	Myanmar	A member of the family Psychomyiidae.	
Palerasnitsynus subgrandis	Sp. nov	Valid	Wichard, Müller & Wang	Late Cretaceous (Cenomanian)	Burmese amber	Myanmar	A member of the family Psychomyiidae.	
Palerasnitsynus subglobolus	Sp. nov	Valid	Wichard, Müller & Wang	Late Cretaceous (Cenomanian)	Burmese amber	Myanmar	A member of the family Psychomyiidae.	
Palerasnitsynus sukatchevae	Sp. nov	Valid	Wichard, Müller & Wang	Late Cretaceous (Cenomanian)	Burmese amber	Myanmar	A member of the family Psychomyiidae.	
Palerasnitsynus vulgaris	Sp. nov	Valid	Wichard, Müller & Wang	Late Cretaceous (Cenomanian)	Burmese amber	Myanmar	A member of the family Psychomyiidae.	
Phylocentropus succinolebanensis	Sp. nov	Valid	Wichard & Azar	Early Cretaceous	Lebanese amber	Lebanon	A member of the family Dipseudopsidae.	
Polylongaevus	Gen. et sp. nov	Valid	Sukatcheva in Aristov & Sukatcheva	Late Jurassic–Early Cretaceous		Russia	A member of the family Polycentropodidae. The type species is P. eskovi.	
Potamophylax martynovorum	Sp. nov	Valid	Sukatsheva et al.	Middle Miocene		Russia		
Triaenodes simoni	Sp. nov	Valid	Wichard, Neumann & Werneburg	Eocene	Baltic amber	Europe (Baltic Sea coast)	A member of the family Leptoceridae.	

=== Other insects ===
Name	Novelty	Status	Authors	Age	Unit	Type Location	Notes	Images
Aiban	Gen. et sp. nov	Valid	Aristov	Middle Triassic (Ladinian)	Madygen Formation	Kyrgyzstan	A member of Cnemidolestida/Cnemidolestodea (an extinct group of insects of uncertain phylogenetic placement, might be related to plecopterans or orthopterans) belonging to the family Sylvabestiidae. Genus includes new species A. kichineis.	
Annulipsyllipsocus	Gen. et 2 sp. nov	Valid	Hakim et al.	Late Cretaceous (Cenomanian)	Burmese amber	Myanmar	A member of Psocodea belonging to the family Psyllipsocidae. Genus includes new species A. andreneli and A. inexspectatus.	
Antiquatortia	Gen. et sp. nov	Valid	Brown & Baixeras in Heikkilä et al.	Miocene (Burdigalian)	La Toca Formation (Dominican amber)	Dominican Republic	A Tortricidae moth. The type species is A. histuroides.	Antiquatortia histuroides
Archaemegaptilus blakelyi	Sp. nov	Valid	Beckemeyer & Engel	Carboniferous (Pennsylvanian)	Pottsville Formation	United States	A member of Palaeodictyoptera belonging to the family Archaemegaptilidae.	
Baltianania	Gen. et sp. nov	Valid	Solis in Heikkilä, Simonsen & Solis	Eocene (Lutetian)	Prussian Formation (Baltic amber)	Russia (Kaliningrad Oblast)	A lepidopteran, probably a member of the family Crambidae. The type species is B. yantarnia.	
Carbohymen	Gen. et sp. nov	Valid	Pecharová & Prokop	Late Carboniferous	Mazon Creek fossil beds	United States	A member of Megasecoptera belonging to the family Protohymenidae. Genus includes new species C. testai.	
Chiastogryllus	Gen. et sp. nov	Valid	Beckemeyer	Early Permian	Wellington Formation	United States	A member of Polyneoptera belonging to the group Eoblattida and the family Blattogryllidae. The type species is C. taschi.	
Cretaceomachilis longa	Sp. nov	Valid	Zhang et al.	Late Cretaceous (Cenomanian)	Burmese amber	Myanmar	A member of Archaeognatha belonging to the family Meinertellidae.	
Dinmopsylla	Gen. et sp. nov	Valid	Lambkin	Late Triassic (Norian)	Dinmore fossil insect locality	Australia	A member of Paraneoptera belonging to the group Permopsocida and the family Archipsyllidae. Genus includes new species D. semota.	
Echmepteryx (Loxopholia) dominicanus	Sp. nov	Valid	Hakim, Huang & Azar	Miocene	Dominican amber	Dominican Republic	A member of the family Lepidopsocidae, a species of Echmepteryx.	
Elasmophasma	Gen. et sp. nov	Valid	Chen et al.	Late Cretaceous (Cenomanian)	Burmese amber	Myanmar	A member of Phasmatodea belonging to the group Euphasmatodea. Genus includes new species E. stictum.	
Eopyralis	Gen. et sp. nov	Valid	Simonsen in Heikkilä, Simonsen & Solis	Eocene (Ypresian)	Fur Formation	Denmark	A lepidopteran, probably a member of the family Pyralidae. The type species is E. morsae.	
Griphopteron iya	Sp. nov	Valid	Aristov in Aristov & Sukatcheva	Middle Jurassic	Cheremkhovo Formation	Russia	A member of Eoblattida belonging to the family Blattogryllidae.	
Hexameropsis elongatus	Sp. nov	Valid	Lin et al.	Late Cretaceous (Cenomanian)	Burmese amber	Myanmar	A mayfly belonging to the family Hexagenitidae.	
Iblatta	Gen. et sp. nov	Valid	Aristov	Permian (Kungurian)		Russia	A member of Polyneoptera belonging to the group Eoblattida. Genus includes new species I. attrepida.	
Issatermes	Gen. et sp. nov	Valid	Aristov	Late Permian		Russia	A member of Cnemidolestida/Cnemidolestodea belonging to the new family Issatermitidae. Genus includes new species I. parvus.	
Karga	Nom. nov	Valid	Aristov	Middle Permian		Russia	A member of Polyneoptera belonging to the group Reculida; a replacement name for Kargalia Aristov (2009).	
Kinitocelis sparsella	Sp. nov	Valid	Mey et al.	Late Cretaceous (Cenomanian)	Burmese amber	Myanmar	A member of Amphiesmenoptera belonging to the group Tarachoptera.	
Lepismachilis eocaenica	Sp. nov	Valid	Kaplin & Perkovsky	Eocene	Rovno amber	Ukraine	A member of Archaeognatha belonging to the family Machilidae.	
Mazonopterum cooperi	Sp. nov	Valid	Prokop et al.	Carboniferous (Pennsylvanian)		United Kingdom	A member of Palaeodictyoptera belonging to the family Homoiopteridae.	
Micropermula ceceya	Sp. nov	Valid	Aristov	Late Permian		Mongolia	A member of Cnemidolestida/Cnemidolestodea belonging to the family Sylvabestiidae.	
Myanmarothrips	Gen. et sp. nov	Valid	Ulitzka	Late Cretaceous (Cenomanian)	Burmese amber	Myanmar	A thrips belonging to the family Merothripidae. The type species is M. pankowskiorum.	
Nullmeinertellus	Gen. et sp. nov	Valid	Zhang et al.	Late Cretaceous (Cenomanian)	Burmese amber	Myanmar	A member of Archaeognatha belonging to the family Meinertellidae. The type species is N. wenxuani.	
Paleolepidopterites	Gen. et comb. nov	Valid	Kozlov in Heikkilä et al.	Eocene (Lutetian to Priabonian)	Prussian Formation (Baltic amber); Florissant Fossil Beds National Monument	Russia (Kaliningrad Oblast); United States	A collective group name for Lepidoptera fossils that cannot be placed with certainty in any known family. Includes Tortrix? florissantana Cockerell (1907), Tortrix? destructus Cockerell (1916) and "Tortricites" sadilenkoi Kozlov (1988).	Paleolepidopterites florissantanus
Paralepinotus	Gen. et sp. nov	Valid	Azar et al.	Early Eocene	Fushun amber	China	A member of Psocodea belonging to the group Trogiomorpha and to the family Trogiidae. Genus includes new species P. fushunensis.	
Protohymen novokshonovi	Sp. nov	Valid	Pecharová & Prokop	Early Permian		Russia	A member of Megasecoptera belonging to the family Protohymenidae.	
Proximicorneus	Gen. et sp. nov	Valid	Lin et al.	Late Cretaceous (Cenomanian)	Burmese amber	Myanmar	A mayfly belonging to the family Prosopistomatidae. Genus includes new species P. rectivenius.	
Retortocelis	Gen. et 3 sp. nov	Valid	Mey et al.	Late Cretaceous (Cenomanian)	Burmese amber	Myanmar	A member of Amphiesmenoptera belonging to the group Tarachoptera. Genus includes new species R. longella, R. minimella and R. tyloptera.	
Rohrthrips burmiticus	Sp. nov	Valid	Ulitzka	Late Cretaceous (Cenomanian)	Burmese amber	Myanmar	A thrips belonging to the family Rohrthripidae.	Rohrthrips burmiticus
Sauk	Gen. et sp. nov	Valid	Aristov in Aristov & Sukatcheva	Early Jurassic	Sauk-Tan'ga locality	Kyrgyzstan	A member of Polyneoptera belonging to the group Reculida and the family Geinitziidae. The type species is S. batkenicus.	
Say	Gen. et sp. nov	Valid	Aristov in Aristov & Sukatcheva	Early–Middle Jurassic	Sogul Formation	Kyrgyzstan	A member of Polyneoptera belonging to the group Reculida and the family Geinitziidae. The type species is S. kirgizicus.	
Shurabia tanga	Sp. nov	Valid	Aristov in Aristov & Sukatcheva	Early Jurassic	Madygen Lagerstätte	Kyrgyzstan	A member of Polyneoptera belonging to the group Reculida and the family Geinitziidae.	
Sibestia	Gen. et sp. nov	Valid	Aristov	Middle Permian		Russia	A member of Cnemidolestida/Cnemidolestodea belonging to the family Sylvabestiidae. Genus includes new species S. nana.	
Stenoraphidia	Gen. et comb. et sp. nov	Valid	Lyu, Ren & Liu	Early Cretaceous (Barremian)	Yixian Formation	China	A snakefly belonging to the family Mesoraphidiidae. Genus includes "Alloraphidia" obliquivenatica Ren (1994) and a new species S. longioccipitalis.	
Tillyardembia zalazna	Sp. nov	Valid	Aristov	Late Permian		Russia	A member of Cnemidolestida/Cnemidolestodea belonging to the family Tillyardembiidae.	
Tshekardushka	Gen. et sp. nov	Valid	Aristov	Permian (Kungurian)		Russia	A member of Polyneoptera belonging to the group Reculida. Genus includes new species T. artenatis.	
Udembia	Gen. et sp. nov	Valid	Aristov	Middle Permian		Russia	A member of Cnemidolestida/Cnemidolestodea belonging to the family Tillyardembiidae. Genus includes new species U. udmurtica.	
Unimeinertellus	Gen. et 2 sp. nov	Valid	Zhang et al.	Late Cretaceous (Cenomanian)	Burmese amber	Myanmar	A member of Archaeognatha belonging to the family Meinertellidae. The type species is U. abundus; genus also includes U. bellus.	
Vernooijia	Gen. et sp. et comb. nov	Valid	Prokop et al.	Carboniferous (Pennsylvanian)		Netherlands; United Kingdom	A member of Palaeodictyoptera belonging to the family Breyeriidae. Genus includes new species V. sassoonae, as well as "Breyeria" harlemensis Brauckmann & Gröning (1996).	
Vokhmia	Gen. et 2 sp. nov	Valid	Aristov	Late Permian		Russia	A member of Cnemidolestida/Cnemidolestodea belonging to the family Sylvabestiidae. Genus includes new species V. pyriformis and V. laxa.	
Votyak	Gen. et sp. nov	Valid	Aristov	Middle Permian		Russia	A member of Cnemidolestida/Cnemidolestodea belonging to the family Sylvabestiidae. Genus includes new species V. pictus.	
Zorotypus (Octozoros) cenomanianus	Sp. nov	Valid	Yin, Cai & Huang	Late Cretaceous (Cenomanian)	Burmese amber	Myanmar	A member of Zoraptera.	
Zorotypus (s. str.) denticulatus	Sp. nov	Valid	Yin, Cai & Huang	Late Cretaceous (Cenomanian)	Burmese amber	Myanmar	A member of Zoraptera.	
Zorotypus dilaticeps	Sp. nov	Valid	Yin et al.	Late Cretaceous (Cenomanian)	Burmese amber	Myanmar	A member of Zoraptera.	
Zorotypus hirsutus	Sp. nov	Valid	Mashimo in Mashimo et al.	Late Cretaceous (Cenomanian)	Burmese amber	Myanmar	A member of Zoraptera.	
Zorotypus oligophleps	Sp. nov	Valid	Liu et al.	Late Cretaceous (Cenomanian)	Burmese amber	Myanmar	A member of Zoraptera.	
Zorotypus robustus	Sp. nov	Valid	Liu et al.	Late Cretaceous (Cenomanian)	Burmese amber	Myanmar	A member of Zoraptera.	

== Research ==
- New insect fossils, including the earliest definite caddisfly cases, water boatmen, diverse polyphagan beetles and scorpionflies, are reported from the Triassic (Ladinian and Carnian) deposits of China by Zheng et al. (2018).
- Insect and plant inclusions are reported from amber from the uppermost Campanian Kabaw Formation of Tilin (Myanmar) by Zheng et al. (2018).
- Taphonomic study aiming to determine whether decay and preservation potential of insects in amber, and therefore bias in the amber fossil record, is affected by resin-type, dehydration prior to entombment, and the composition of the gut microbiota, is published by McCoy et al. (2018).
- A study on the evolution of insects as indicated by the morphological diversity of their mouthparts is published by Nel, Bertrand & Nel (2018).
- A study on the atmospheric oxygen levels through the Phanerozoic, evaluating whether Romer's gap and the concurrent gap in the fossil record of insects were caused by low oxygen levels, is published by Schachat et al. (2018).
- Reevaluation of the Jurassic ichnospecies Lunulipes obscurus is published by Getty & Loeb (2018), who interpret these trackways as most likely to be produced by a water boatman or an unknown insect that employed a similar method of swimming.
- An ellipsoidal chamber composed of a thin organic layer, interpreted as a likely insect cocoon or pupation chamber, is described from the Lower Cretaceous Jinju Formation (South Korea) by Lee (2018).
- A study on the body size of soil-dwelling insects across the Cretaceous-Paleogene boundary, inferred from burrows from the Big Bend National Park (Texas, United States) which were likely produced by beetle larvae or cicada nymphs, is published by Wiest et al. (2018).
- A study on the impact of sampling standardization, or lack thereof, on comparisons of insect herbivory from two Lower Permian localities in Texas is published by Schachat, Labandeira & Maccracken (2018).
- A study on the diversity, frequency and representation of insect damage of fossil plant specimens from the Permian La Golondrina Formation (Argentina) is published by Cariglino (2018).
- A study on the insect herbivory on fossil ginkgoalean and bennettitalean leaves from the Middle Jurassic Daohugou Beds (China), and on defenses of these plants against insect herbivory, is published by Na et al. (2018).
- A study on the plant–insect interactions in the European forest plant communities in the Upper Pliocene Lagerstätte of Willershausen (Lower Saxony, Germany), the Upper Pliocene locality of Berga (Thuringia, Germany) and the Pleistocene locality of Bernasso (France) is published by Adroit et al. (2018).
- Description and analysis of insect borings on hadrosaur bones from the late Campanian Cerro del Pueblo Formation (Mexico) is published by Serrano-Brañas, Espinosa-Chávez & Maccracken (2018), who name a new ichnospecies Cubiculum atsintli.
- Insect trace fossils collected from the Pliocene deposits at Laetoli (Tanzania) are described by Genise & Harrison (2018), who name new ichnotaxa Celliforma ritchiei, Laetolichnus kwekai and Teisseirei linguatus.
- Trace fossil produced by a wingless jumping insect belonging to the order Monura is described from the lower Permian of Southern Alps (Italy) by Bernardi, Marchetti & Gobbi (2018).
- A study on the venation in the forewing of the Triassic odonatopteran Zygophlebia tongchuanensis and extant dragonfly Aeshna isoceles is published by Jacquelin et al. (2018).
- Redescription of the meganeurid species Meganeurites gracilipes is published by Nel et al. (2018), who interpret this species as unlikely to have lived in densely forested environments, and more likely to be an open-space, ecotone or riparian forest predator, hunting in a way similar to extant hawkers.
- A study on the phylogenetic relationships of an Early Cretaceous plecopteran "Rasnitsyrina" culonga Sinitshenkova (2011) is published by Cui, Toussaint & Béthoux (2018).
- A female specimen of the plecopteran genus Podmosta, distinguished from other Podmosta females by the "rabbit-shaped" sclerite on sternum 8, is described from the Lithuanian Baltic amber by Chen (2018).
- A study on the structure of the wing base of the spilapterid palaeodictyopteran Dunbaria is published by Prokop et al. (2018).
- A study on the morphology of ovipositors of different fossil dictyopterans, on their possible reproductive strategies and on the evolution of the reproductive strategies within Dictyoptera is published by Hörnig et al. (2018).
- Cui, Evangelista & Béthoux (2018) reinterpret putative fossil mantis Prochaeradodis enigmaticus as more likely to be a cockroach belonging to the family Blaberidae.
- A revision of the hymenopteran fauna from the collection of the Cretaceous Burmese amber at the Nanjing Institute of Geology and Palaeontology (Chinese Academy of Sciences) is published by Zhang et al. (2018).
- An overview of the Eocene (Ypresian) hymenopteran assemblage of the Okanagan Highlands of British Columbia (Canada) and Washington (United States) is published by Archibald et al. (2018).
- A female of Dryinus janzeni is described from the Eocene Rovno amber (Ukraine) by Perkovsky & Olmi (2018), representing the first record of the dryinid genus Dryinus from Rovno amber.
- A study on the shape of the wing and the venational structures of the Eocene giant ants, including members of the genus Titanomyrma, evaluating the possibilities of determining species and sex of individual specimens with the use of geometric morphometrics, is published by Katzke et al. (2018).
- Fossil ant species Eocenomyrma rugosostriata is reported for the first time from the Eocene Rovno amber by Radchenko & Perkovsky (2018).
- A redescription of the Cretaceous nevrorthid species Cretarophalis patrickmuelleri is published by Lu et al. (2018).
- A redescription of the Cretaceous psychopsid species Grammapsychops lebedevi is published by Makarkin (2018).
- The first definite Mesozoic strepsipteran primary larva is reported from the Cretaceous amber from Myanmar by Pohl et al. (2018).
- A study on the phylogenetic relationships of the fossil rove beetles Cretodeinopsis and Electrogymnusa is published by Yamamoto & Maruyama (2018), who also describe new fossil material of Cretodeinopsis and Electrogymnusa.
- Remains of fossil nests of dung beetles, recorded in four formations of the Cenozoic of South America, are described by Cantil et al. (2018).
- A study on the phylogenetic placement of the fossil beetle "Spondylis" florissantensis is published by Vitali (2018), who transfers this species to the genus Neandra.
- The cosmopolitan beetle Necrobia violacea, formerly thought to be introduced to the New World through European trade, is reported from the La Brea Tar Pits by Holden, Barclay & Angus (2018).
- A study on the lepidopteran scales from the Triassic-Jurassic transition (Rhaetian-Hettangian) of Germany and their implications for inferring the timing of the radiation of lepidopteran lineages is published by van Eldijk et al. (2018).
- A study on the architecture of scales of Jurassic lepidopterans from the United Kingdom, Germany, Kazakhstan and China, and of tarachopterans from the Cretaceous amber from Myanmar, is published by Zhang et al. (2018).
- A study on the macroevolutionary responses of noctuid moths from the group Sesamiina and their associated host-grasses to environmental changes during the Neogene is published by Kergoat et al. (2018).
- A study on the anatomy of the digestive system of Saurophthirus longipes is published by Rasnitsyn & Strelnikova (2018).
- Mecopteran species "Orthophlebia" martynovae from the Lower Jurassic of Siberia (Russia) is transferred to the family Austropanorpidae and to the genus Austropanorpa by Krzemiński et al. (2018).
- Revision of the original type material and description of new fossils of the mecopteran species Chorista sobrina and Austropanorpa australis from the Paleogene Redbank Plains Formation (Australia) is published by Lambkin (2018).
- Redescription of known members of the peloropeodine genus Palaeomedeterus from Baltic amber is published by Grichanov & Negrobov (2018), who provide a key to species of Palaeomedeterus from Baltic amber.
- A study on changes in insect biodiversity in terms of the number of families throughout the history of the group is published by Dmitriev et al. (2018).
