= Lunulipes =

Scientific classification
- Kingdom: Animalia
- Phylum: Arthropoda
- Class: Insecta
- Order: Hemiptera
- Suborder: Heteroptera
- Family: Corixidae
- Genus: †Lunulipes

Trace fossil

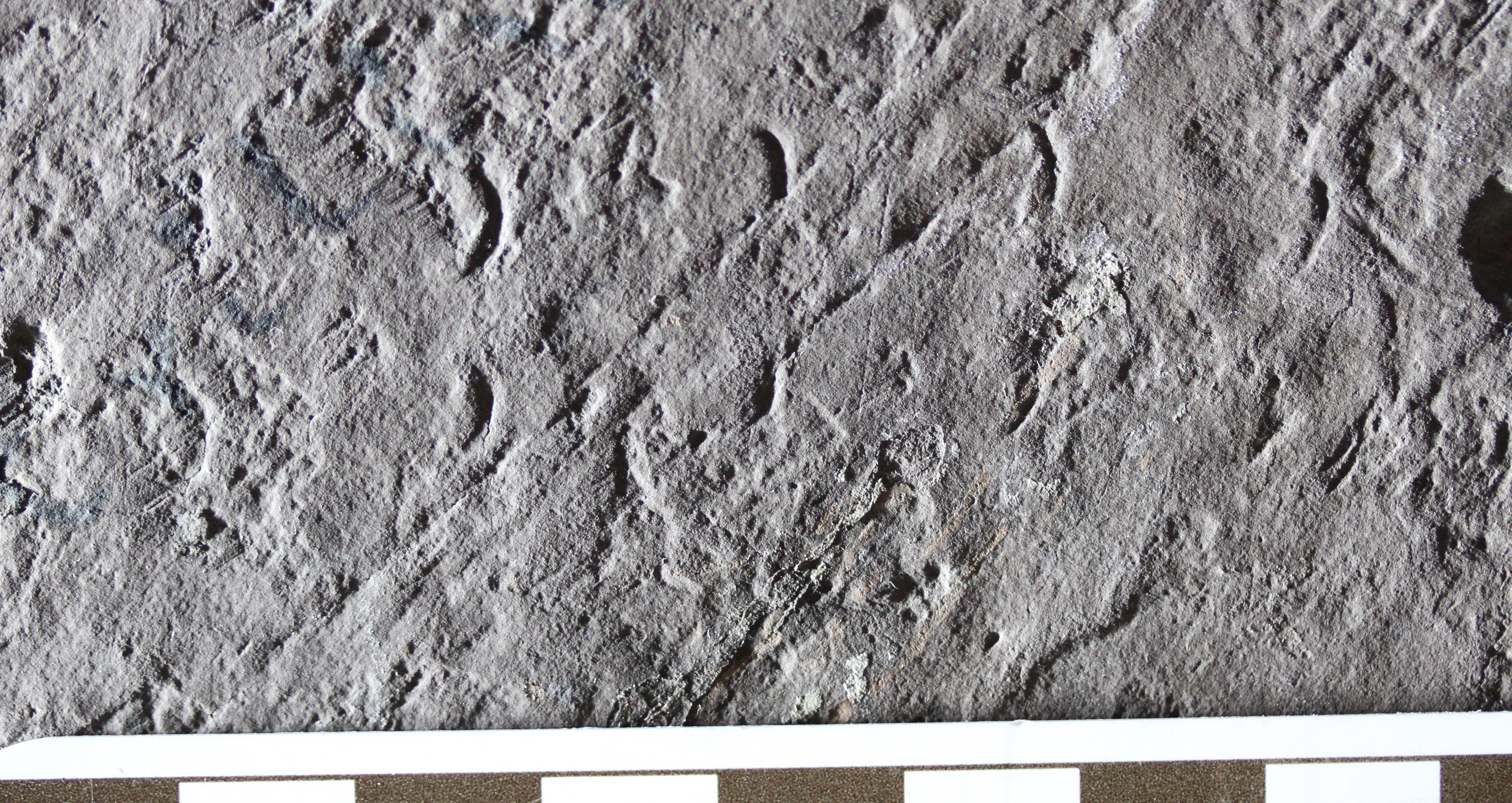
Lunulipes obscurus from the Early Jurassic Turners Falls Formation of Massachusetts. This specimen is one of seven on a slab of stone labeled 52/14 and housed at the Beneski Museum of Natural History at Amherst College. Scale is in cm.

Lunulipes, meaning crescent foot, is an ichnogenus for fossil trackways discovered in shallow lacustrine deposits of the Lower Jurassic Turners Falls Formation of the Deerfield Basin in Massachusetts. These trackways consist of two rows of crescent-shaped tracks, with the tracks in each row arranged one behind the other. Some trackways also exhibit a median furrow. The ichnogenus was originally erected under the name Lunula by Edward Hitchcock, but subsequent workers showed that the original name had been used previously for a bryozoan. Getty (2017) subsequently changed the name to Lunulipes, in accordance with International Code of Zoological Nomenclature rules. Only a single species, obscurus, is recognized.

Hitchcock (1865) considered the most likely trace maker to be a myriapod. Richard Swann Lull subsequently proposed that the trackway was made by either a crustacean or an unknown arthropod. Getty and Loeb (2018), however, noted that published myriapod and crustacean trackways don't strongly resemble Lunulipes. Instead, they proposed that Lunulipes was most likely made by aquatic insects called water boatmen (family Corixidae), or similar insects, based on the general similarity of the fossil trackways to those made by water boatmen in shallow water in laboratory experiments.
