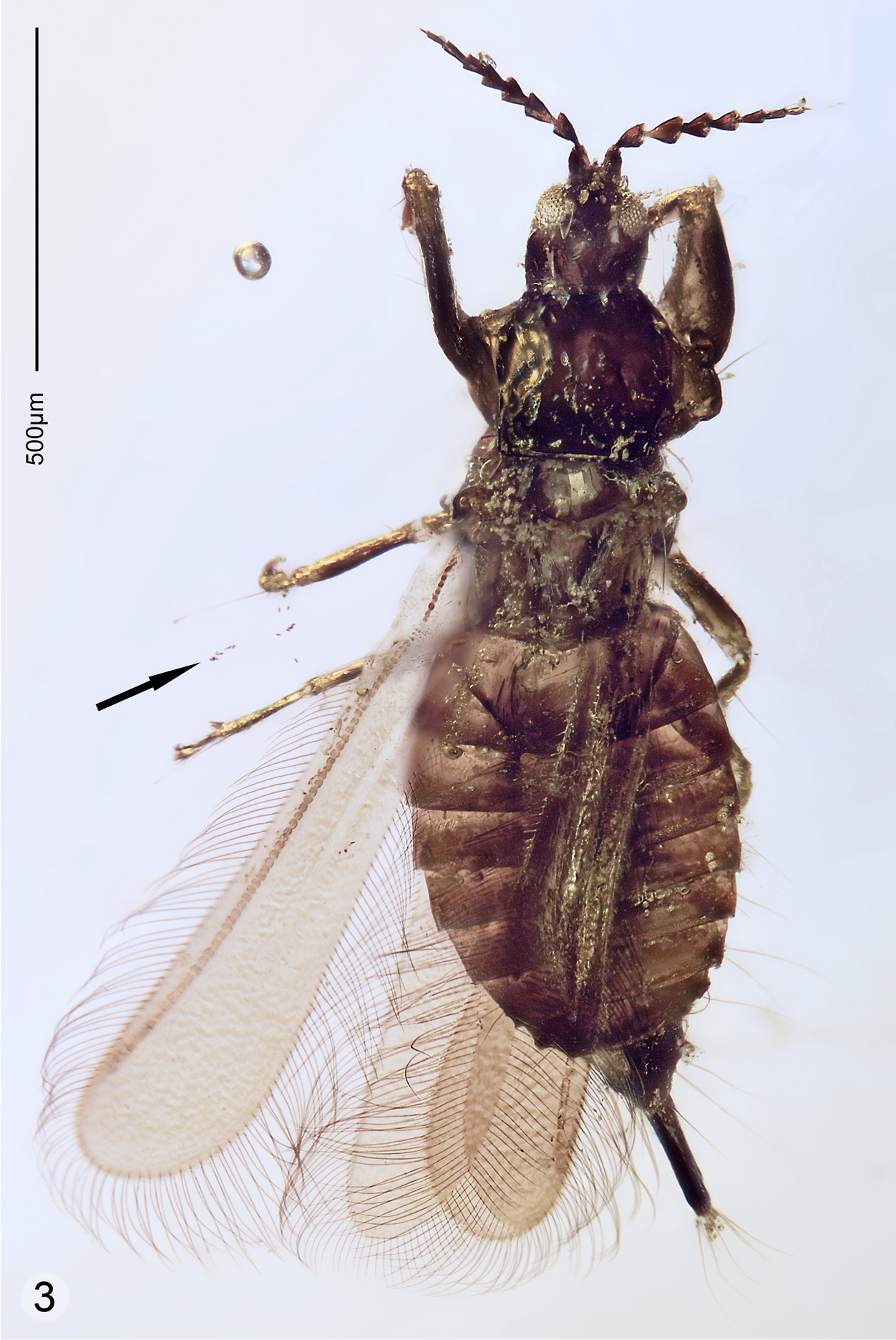
- Rohrthrips jiewenae

Scientific classification
- Kingdom: Animalia
- Phylum: Arthropoda
- Class: Insecta
- Order: Thysanoptera
- Suborder: Tubulifera
- Family: †Rohrthripidae; Ulitzka, 2018
- Genus: †Rohrthrips; Nel et al, 2010

= Rohrthrips =

Rohrthrips Temporal range: 130–125.45 Ma Early Cretaceous

Genus of thrips

Rohrthrips is a fossil genus of thrips in the family Rohrthripidae.

Fossils are only found in amber, collected from Lebanon and Myanmar.

== Species ==
- †Rohrthrips breviceps
- †Rohrthrips burmiticus
- †Rohrthrips jiewenae
- †Rohrthrips libanicus
- †Rohrthrips maryae
- †Rohrthrips patrickmuelleri
- †Rohrthrips schizovenatus
