= Philorheithridae =

Scientific classification
- Kingdom: Animalia
- Phylum: Arthropoda
- Clade: Pancrustacea
- Class: Insecta
- Order: Trichoptera
- Infraorder: Brevitentoria
- Family: Philorheithridae; Mosely 1936

Family of caddisflies

Philorheithridae is a family of caddisflies in the order Trichoptera. There are about 8 genera and more than 20 described species in Philorheithridae.

== Genera ==
These eight genera belong to the family Philorheithridae:

- Aphilorheithrus Mosely, 1936
- Austrheithrus Mosely, 1953
- Kosrheithrus Mosely, 1953
- Mystacopsyche Schmid, 1955
- Philorheithrus Hare, 1910
- Psilopsyche Ulmer, 1907
- Ramiheithrus Neboiss, 1974
- Tasmanthrus Mosely, 1936
