= Dorytocus =

Scientific classification
- Domain: Eukaryota
- Kingdom: Animalia
- Phylum: Arthropoda
- Class: Insecta
- Order: Hemiptera
- Suborder: Auchenorrhyncha
- Infraorder: Fulgoromorpha
- Family: †Dorytocidae
- Genus: †Dorytocus; Emelyanov & Shcherbakov, 2018

Extinct genus of insects

Dorytocidae is an extinct family of planthoppers. It contains the single genus, Dorytocus.
