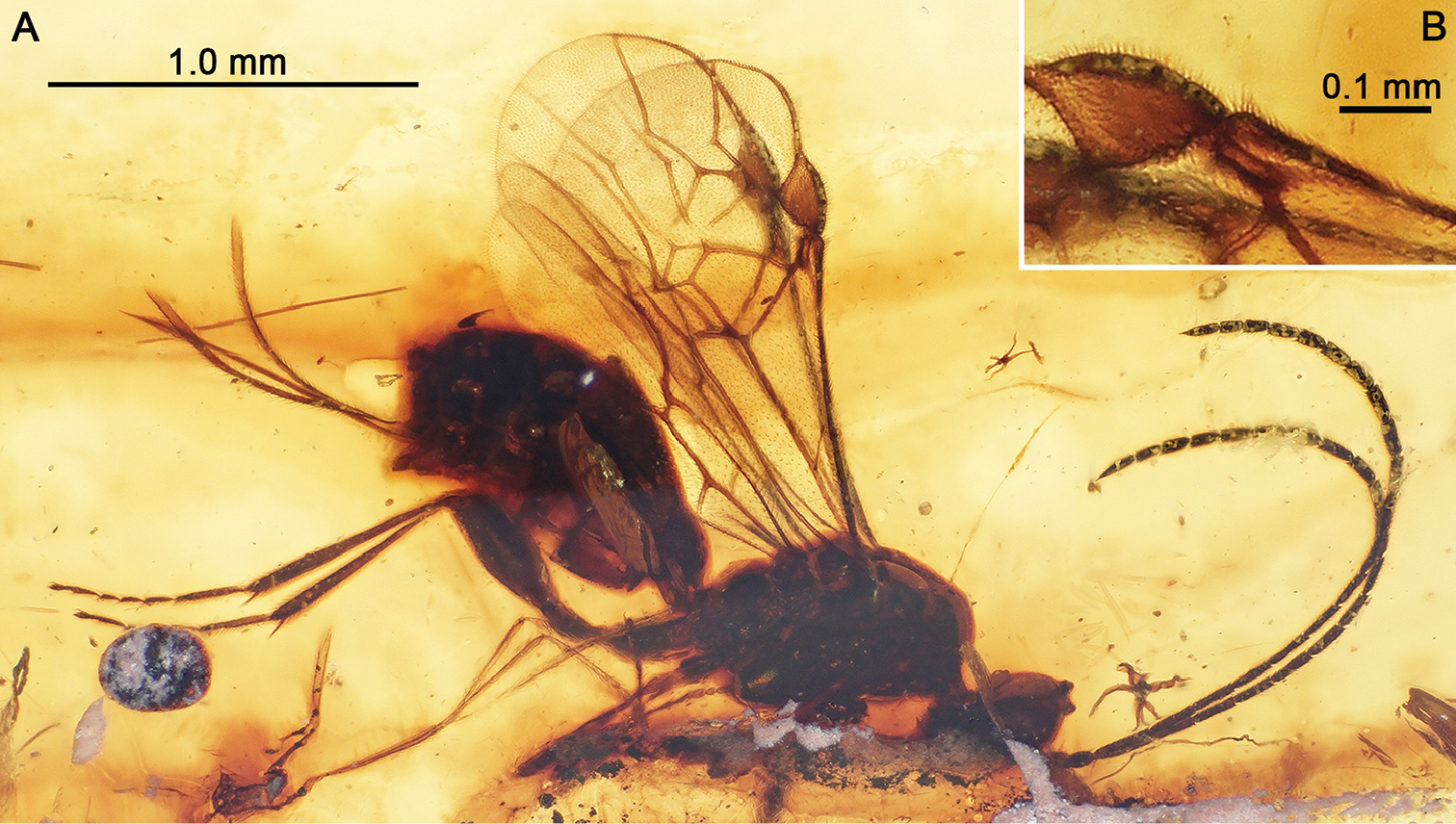
- Seneciobracon novalatus

Scientific classification
- Kingdom: Animalia
- Phylum: Arthropoda
- Class: Insecta
- Order: Hymenoptera
- Family: Braconidae
- Subfamily: †Protorhyssalinae
- Genus: †Seneciobracon; Engel & Huang, 2018
- Species: †S. novalatus

Binomial name
- †Seneciobracon novalatus Engel & Huang, 2018

= Seneciobracon =

Seneciobracon Temporal range: 100.5–93.9 Ma

Extinct genus of insects

Seneciobracon is an extinct genus of parasitic wasps found in Burmese amber containing the single species Seneciobracon novalatus. It was formerly placed under the monotypic subfamily Seneciobraconinae, but was moved to Protorhyssalinae in 2021.
