= Palerasnitsynus =

Palerasnitsynus Temporal range: Cretaceous

Scientific classification
- Kingdom: Animalia
- Phylum: Arthropoda
- Clade: Pancrustacea
- Class: Insecta
- Order: Trichoptera
- Family: Psychomyiidae
- Genus: †Palerasnitsynus; Wichard, Ross & Ross, 2011

Type species
- Palerasnitsynus ohlhoffi Wichard, Ross & Ross, 2011

Species
- Palerasnitsynus aggregatus; Palerasnitsynus ohlhoffi; Palerasnitsynus queqiaoi; Palerasnitsynus xiuqiu

Genus of caddisflies

Palerasnitsynus is a genus of extinct caddisfly that existed during the Late Albian Cretaceous of Myanmar.
