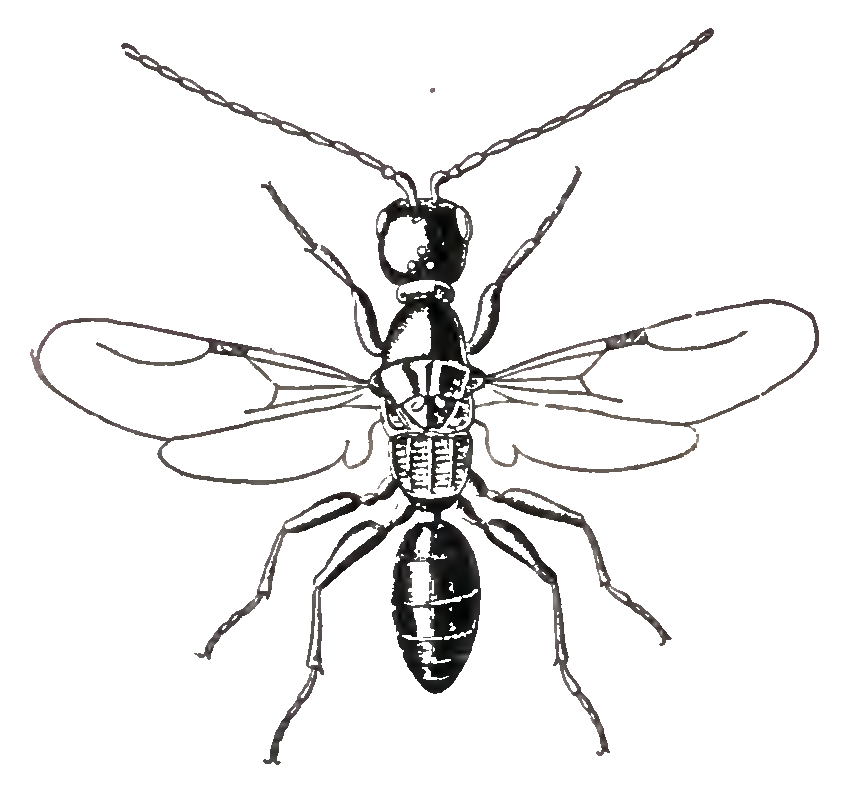
- Epyris niger male

Scientific classification
- Kingdom: Animalia
- Phylum: Arthropoda
- Class: Insecta
- Order: Hymenoptera
- Family: Bethylidae
- Subfamily: Epyrinae
- Genus: Epyris; Westwood, 1832

= Epyris =

Genus of wasps

Epyris is a genus of chrysidoid wasps in the family Bethylidae. There are at least 50 described species in the genus Epyris.

== Species ==
The following are species of Epyris:

- Epyris aequalis Lim & S.Lee
- Epyris afer Magretti, 1884
- Epyris apicalis Smith, 1874
- Epyris apterus Cameron, 1888
- Epyris arcuatus Kieffer, 1906
- Epyris asura Terayama, 2006
- Epyris azevedoi Tribull
- Epyris bayeri Hoffer, 1935
- Epyris bilineatus Thomson, 1862
- Epyris biroi Moczar, 1966
- Epyris breviclypeatus Lim & S.Lee
- Epyris brevipennis Kieffer, 1906
- Epyris carbunculus Nagy, 1970
- Epyris carpenteri Tribull
- Epyris corcyraeus Kieffer, 1907
- Epyris darani Terayama, 2006
- Epyris dulicus Lim & S.Lee
- Epyris enerterus Stein & Azevedo
- Epyris erythrocerus Kieffer, 1906
- Epyris evanescens Kieffer, 1906
- Epyris finitus Lim & S.Lee
- Epyris foveatus Kieffer, 1904
- Epyris fulgeocauda Tribull
- Epyris fulvimanus Kieffer, 1907
- Epyris fuscipalpis Kieffer, 1906
- Epyris fuscipes Kieffer, 1906
- Epyris gaullei Kieffer, 1906
- Epyris hangunensis Terayama, 2005
- Epyris herschae Tribull
- Epyris idaten Terayama, 2006
- Epyris inermis Kieffer, 1906
- Epyris insulanus Kieffer, 1906
- Epyris jeonbukensis Lim & S.Lee
- Epyris limatulus Lim & S.Lee
- Epyris loisae Tribull
- Epyris longiantennatus Lim & S.Lee
- Epyris longicephalus Terayama, 2005
- Epyris longicollis Kieffer, 1906
- Epyris macrocerus Kieffer, 1906
- Epyris macromma Kieffer, 1906
- Epyris marshalli Kieffer, 1906
- Epyris maximus Berland, 1928
- Epyris minor Kieffer, 1906
- Epyris mureungensis Lim & S.Lee
- Epyris niger Westwood, 1832
- Epyris niwoh Terayama, 2006
- Epyris penatii Stein & Azevedo
- Epyris quinquecarinatus Kieffer, 1906
- Epyris rufimanus Kieffer, 1914
- Epyris sauteri (Enderlein, 1920)
- Epyris sublevis Kieffer, 1904
- Epyris sudosanensis Lim & S.Lee
- Epyris tardus Kieffer, 1906
- Epyris transversus Kieffer, 1906
- Epyris tricolor Cameron, 1888
- Epyris yamatonis Terayama, 1999
- Epyris yetus Lim & S.Lee
