= Ironomyiidae =

Ironomyiidae Temporal range: Aptian–Recent

Scientific classification
- Kingdom: Animalia
- Phylum: Arthropoda
- Clade: Pancrustacea
- Class: Insecta
- Order: Diptera
- Section: Aschiza
- Superfamily: Phoroidea
- Family: Ironomyiidae; McAlpine & Martin, 1966

Type species
- Ironomyia nigromaculata White, 1916

Genera
- See text

Family of flies

Ironomyiidae is a small family of flies in the order Diptera. Historically, they had been included in the family Platypezidae, and includes three extant species within the single extant genus Ironomyia endemic to Australia and a number of extinct fossil genera from North America and Asia extending back to the Early Cretaceous.

== Genera ==
- Ironomyia White, 1916
  - Ironomyia francisi McAlpine, 2008
  - Ironomyia nigromaculata White, 1916
  - Ironomyia whitei McAlpine, 2008
- †Cretonomyia McAlpine 1973 Canadian amber, Campanian
- †Proironia Grimaldi 2018 Burmese amber, Myanmar, Cenomanian
- †Eridomyia Mostovski 1995 Ola Formation, Russia, Campanian
- †Hermaeomyia Mostovski 1995 Dzun-Bain Formation, Mongolia, Aptian Zaza Formation, Russia, Aptian, Ola Formation, Russia, Campanian
- †Palaeopetia Zhang 1987 Laiyang Formation, China, Aptian, Dzun-Bain Formation, Mongolia, Aptian Zaza Formation, Russia, Aptian, Ola Formation, Russia, Campanian
- †Macalpinomyia Li and Yeates 2018 Burmese amber, Myanmar, Cenomanian
