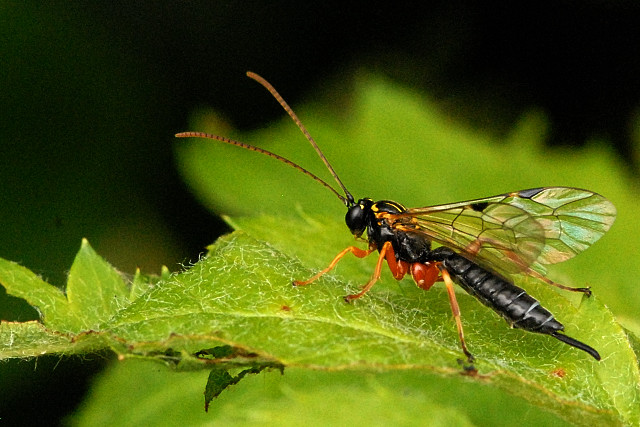
- Apechthis rufata

Scientific classification
- Kingdom: Animalia
- Phylum: Arthropoda
- Clade: Pancrustacea
- Class: Insecta
- Order: Hymenoptera
- Family: Ichneumonidae
- Subfamily: Pimplinae; Wesmael, 1845

= Pimplinae =

Subfamily of wasps

Pimplinae are a worldwide subfamily of the parasitic wasp family Ichneumonidae.

Pimplinae are parasitoids of Holometabola, often the pupae of Lepidoptera. Various species parasitize the egg sacs and adults of spiders. Those species that parasitize eggs are ectoparasitic idiobionts. Females perforate the silk of the egg sacs and lay their egg(s) directly onto the surface of the eggs within them. After hatching, the parasitoid larvae feed externally on the eggs and kill most of the eggs in the process.

Pimplinae are generally sturdy black insects with orange markings. The first tergite is box-like with the spiracle anterior to the middle.

== Tribes and genera ==
The Pimplinae consists of four tribes and includes:

=== Delomeristini ===
Authority: Hellén, 1915

- Atractogaster Kriechbaumer, 1872
- Delomerista Förster, 1868
- Perithous Holmgren, 1859
- Pseudorhyssa Merrill, 1915

=== Tribe Ephialtini ===
Authority: Hellén, 1915

==== Pseudopimpla genus-group ====
- Pseudopimpla Habermehl, 1917

==== Alophosternum genus-group ====
- Alophosternum Cushman, 1933
- Pachymelos Baltazar, 1961

==== Camptotypus genus-group ====
- Camptotypus Kriechbaumer, 1889
- Clydonium Townes, 1966
- Hemipimpla Saussure, 1892
- Odontopimpla Cameron, 1886
- Parvipimpla Gauld, 1984
- Zonopimpla Ashmead, 1900

==== Ephialtes genus-group ====
- Afrephialtes Benoit, 1963
- Anastelgis Townes, 1960
- Calliephialtes Ashmead, 1900
- Dolichomitus Smith, 1877
- Endromopoda Hellén, 1939
- Ephialtes Gravenhorst, 1829
- Exeristes Förster, 1869
- Exestuberis Wang & Yue, 1995
- Flavopimpla Betrem, 1932
- Fredegunda Fitton, Shaw & Gauld, 1988
- Leptopimpla Townes, 1961
- Liotryphon Ashmead, 1900
- Paraperithous Haupt, 1954
- Pimplaetus Seyrig, 1932
- Scambus Hartig, 1838
- Townesia Ozols, 1962
- Umanella Gauld, 1991
- Xanthephialtes Cameron, 1906
- Xanthophenax Saussure, 1892

==== Polysphincta genus-group ====
- Acrodactyla Haliday, 1838
- Acropimpla Townes, 1960
- Acrotaphus Townes, 1960
- Afrosphincta Benoit, 1953
- Aravenator Momoi, 1973
- Dreisbachia Townes, 1962
- Eriostethus Morley, 1914
- Eruga Townes & Townes, 1960
- Flacopimpla Gauld, 1991
- Hymenoepimecis Viereck, 1912
- Oxyrrhexis Förster, 1868
- Piogaster Perkins, 1958
- Polysphincta Gravenhorst, 1829
- Pterinopus Townes, 1969
- Reclinervellus He & Ye, 1998
- Schizopyga Gravenhorst, 1829
- Sericopimpla Kriechbaumer, 1895
- Sinarachna Townes, 1960
- Ticapimpla Gauld, 1991
- Zabrachypus Cushman, 1920
- Zatypota Förster, 1869

==== Tromatobia genus-group ====
- Clistopyga Gravenhorst, 1829
- Gregopimpla Momoi, 1965
- Iseropus Förster, 1868
- Tromatobia Förster, 1869
- Zaglyptus Förster, 1869

=== Pimplini ===
Authority: Wesmael, 1845

- Alophopimpla Momoi, 1966
- Apechthis Förster, 1868
- Echthromorpha Holmgren, 1868
- Itoplectis Förster, 1869
- Lissopimpla Kriechbaumer, 1889
- †Parapimpla Théobald, 1937
- Pimpla Fabricius, 1804
- Strongylopsis Brauns, 1896
- Xanthopimpla Saussure, 1892

=== Theroniini ===
Authority: Cushman & Rohwer, 1920

- Augerella Gupta, 1962
- Epitheronia Gupta, 1962
- Neotheronia Krieger, 1899
- Nomosphecia Gupta, 1962
- Parema Gupta, 1962
- Theronia Holmgren, 1859

== Gallery ==
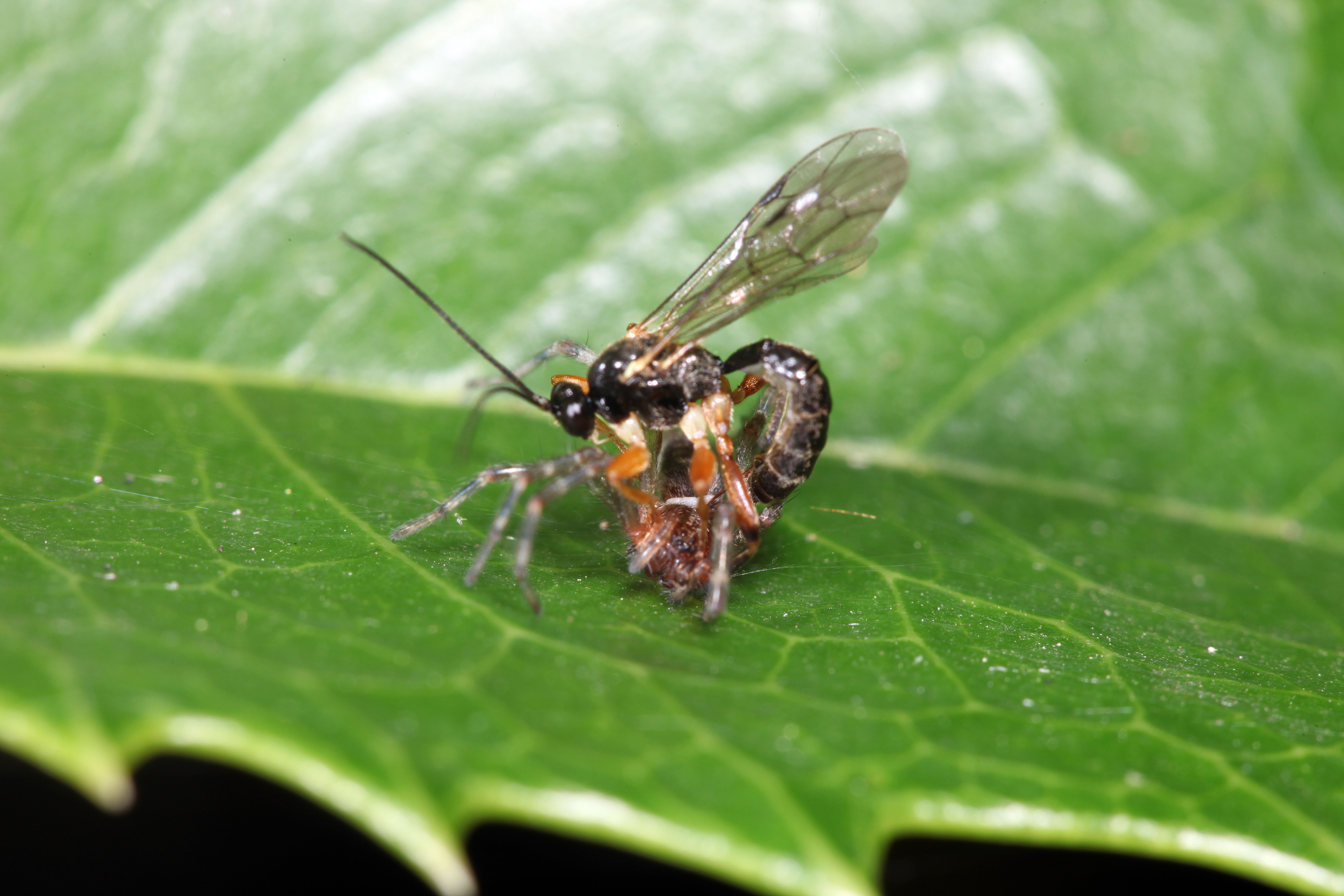
Brachyzapus nikkoensis depositing egg on a spider

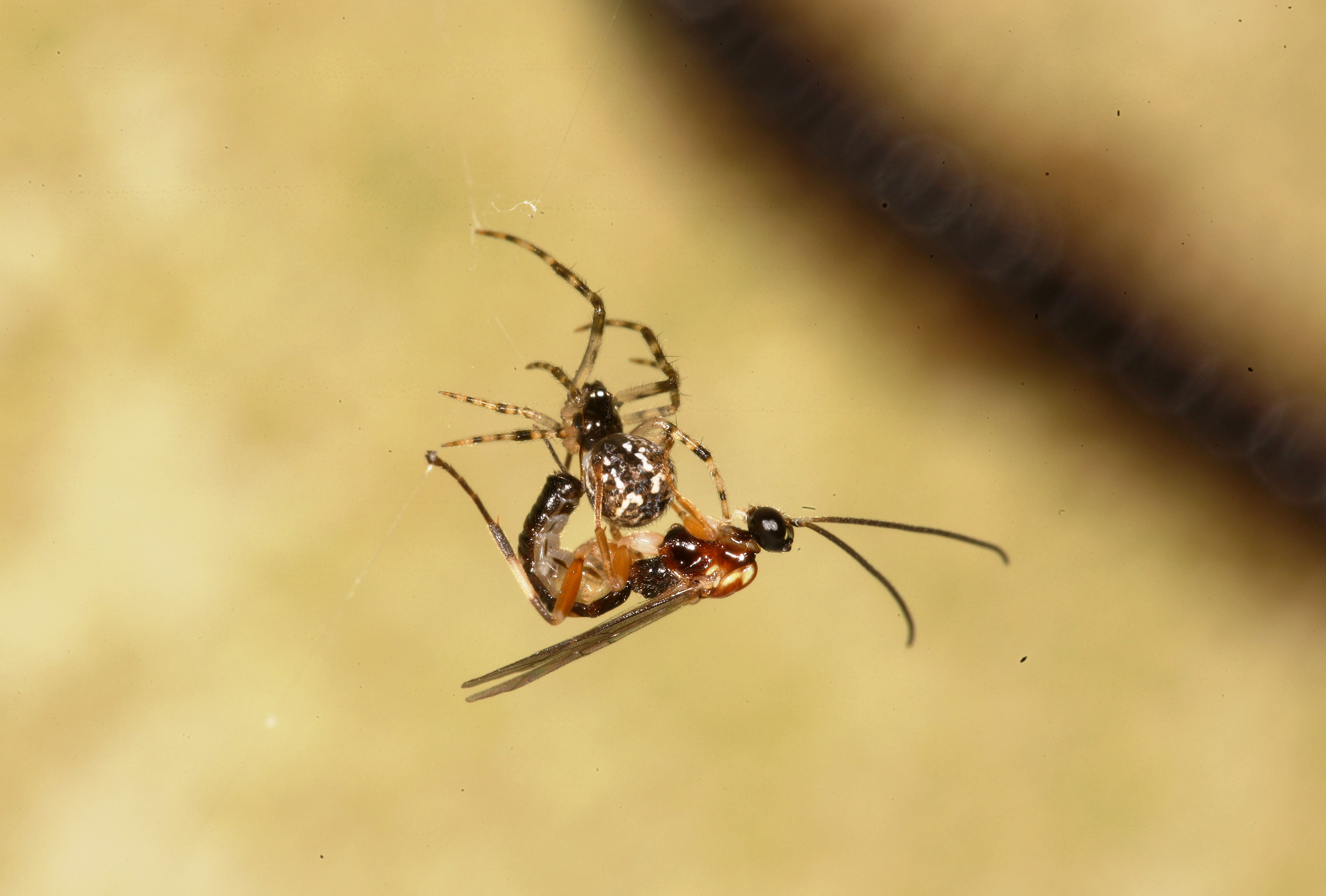
Zatypota albicoxa depositing egg on a spider

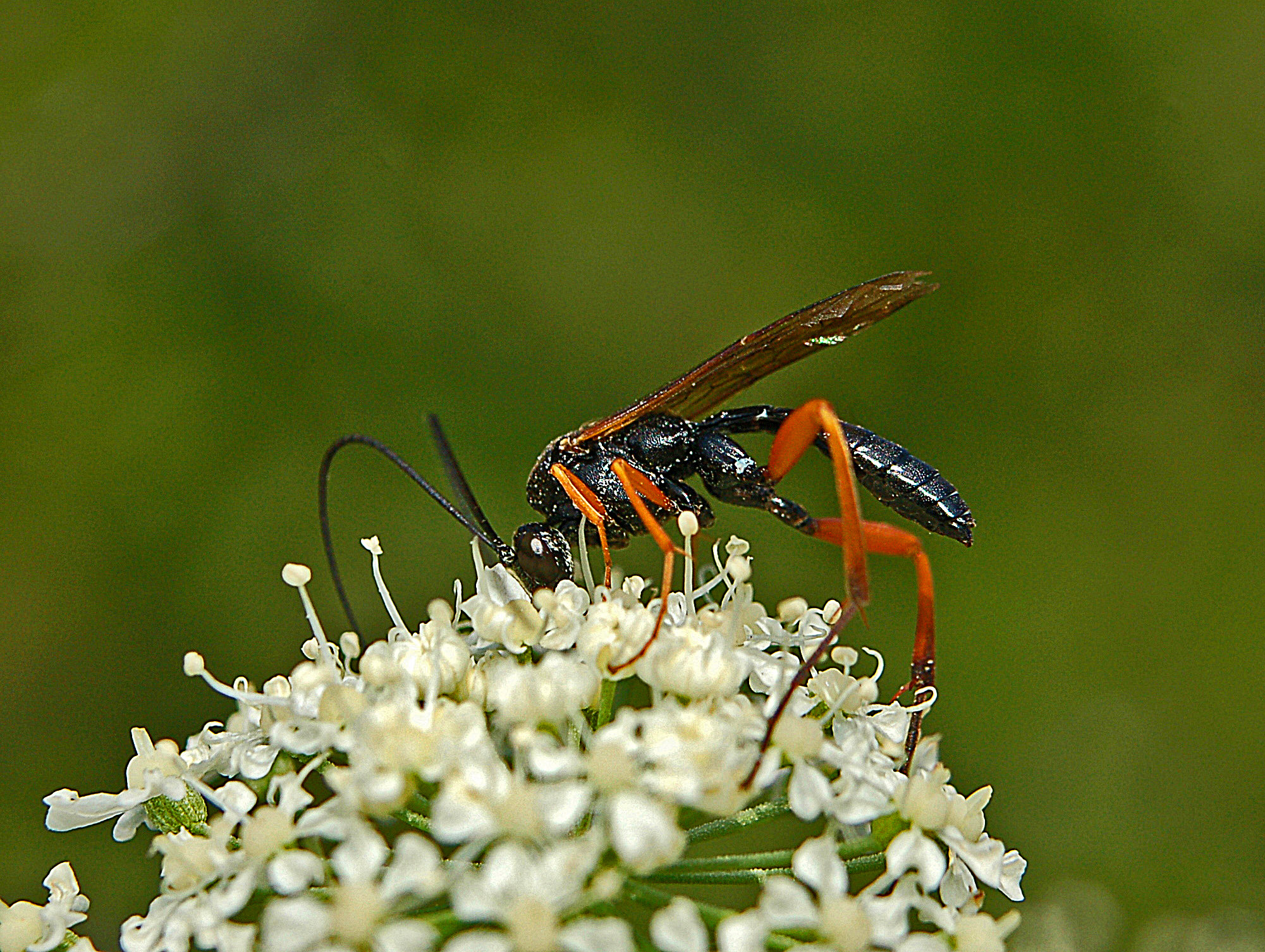
Pimpla rufipes

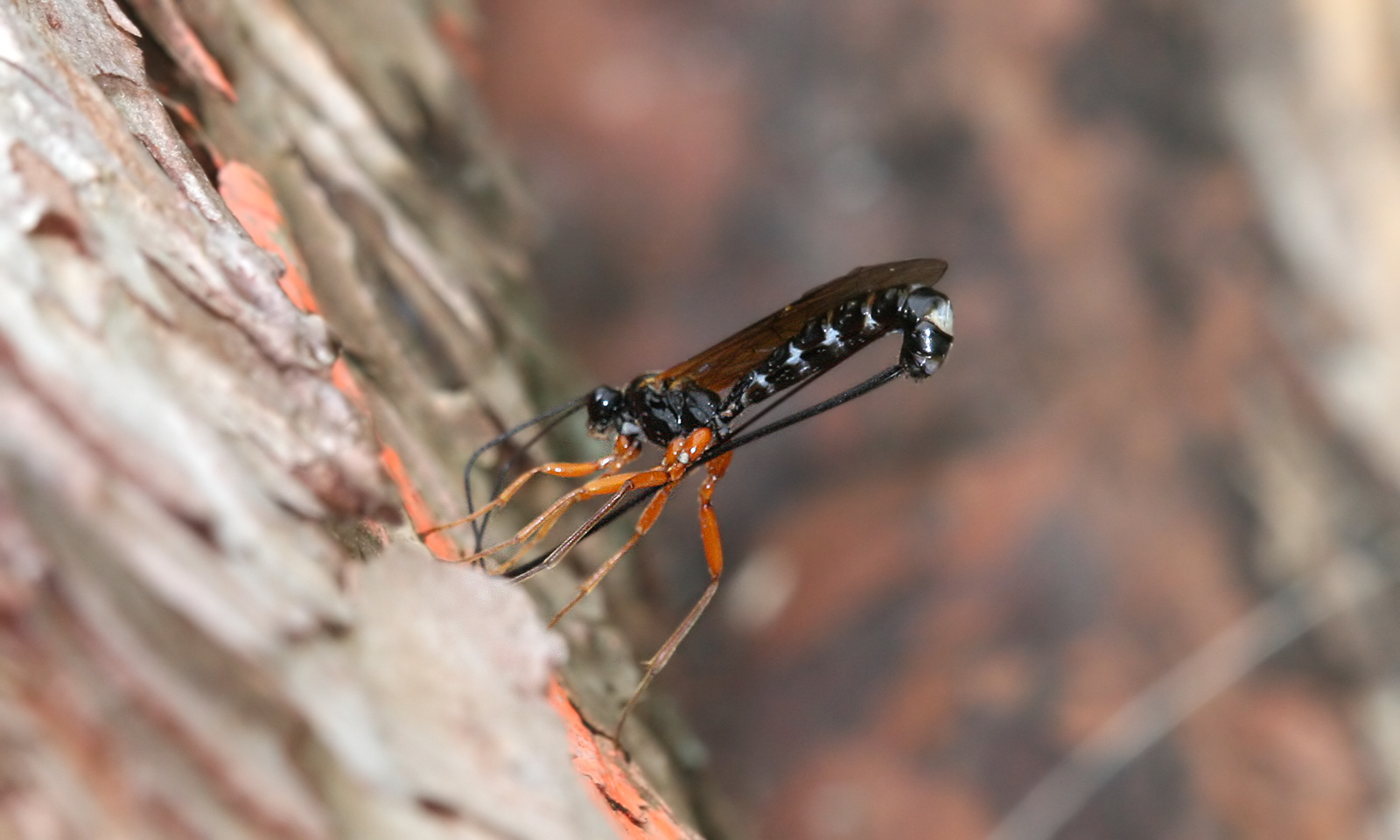
Dolichomitus sp.

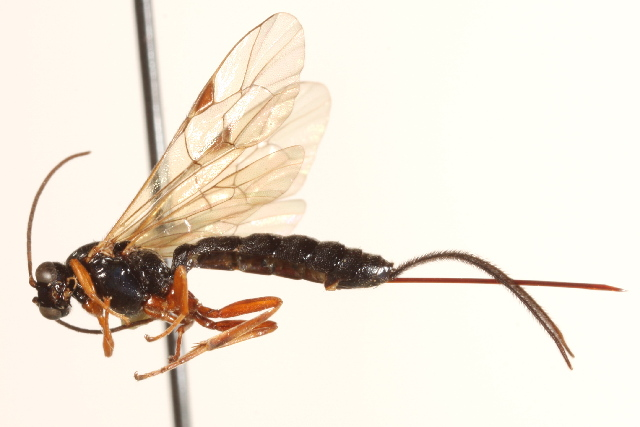
Scambus buolianae

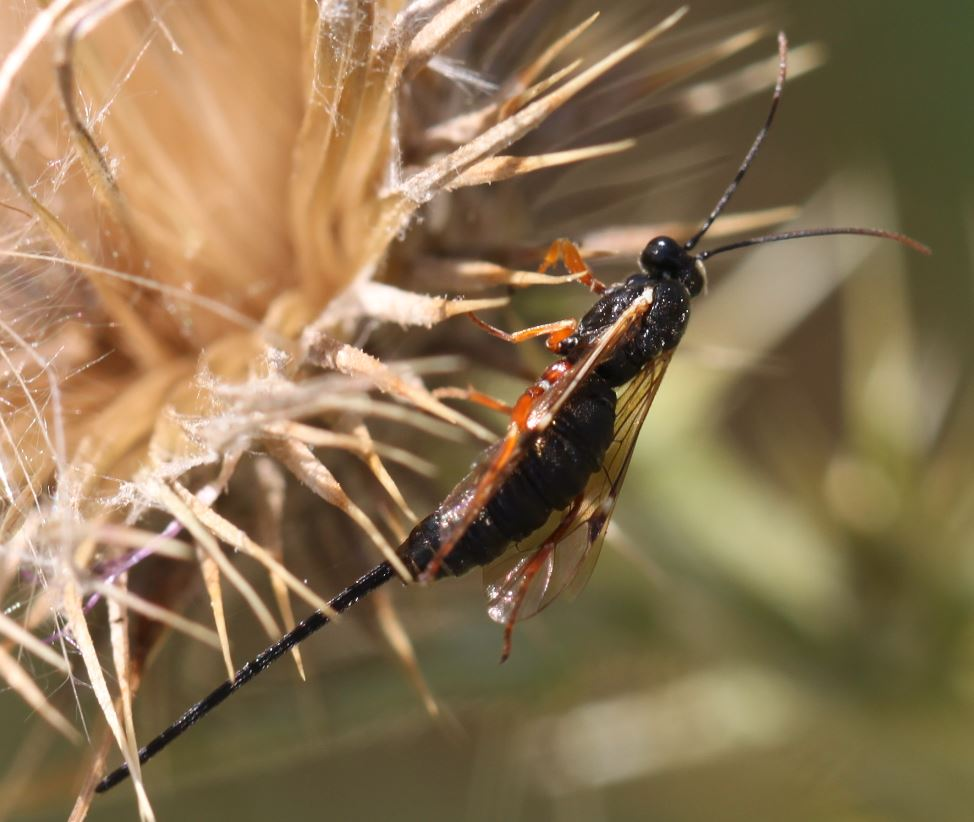
Exeristes roborator
