= Ovipositor =

Anatomical structure for laying eggs

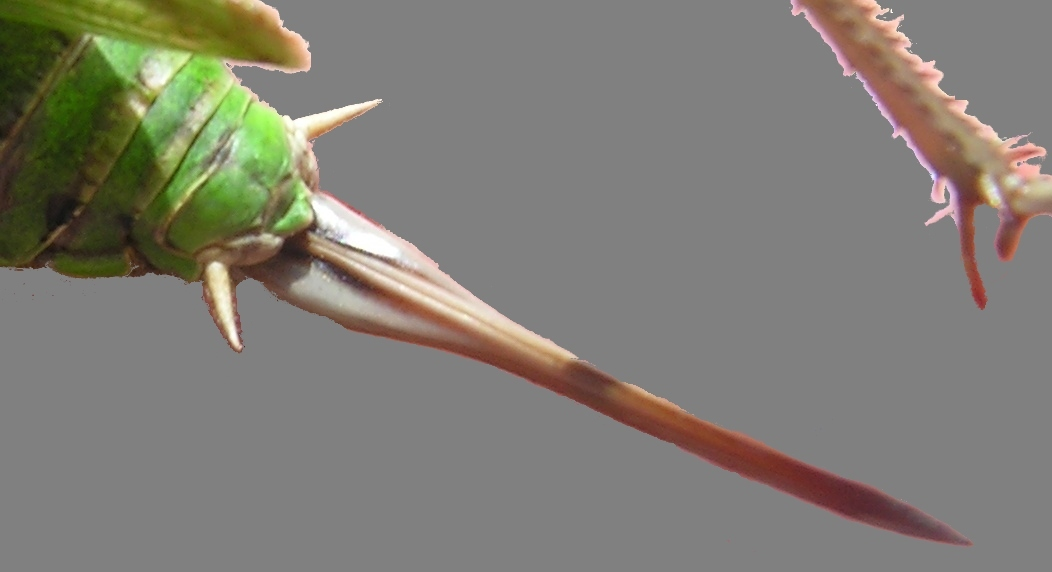
Ovipositor of long-horned grasshopper (the two cerci are also visible)

The ovipositor is a tube-like organ used by some animals, especially insects, for laying eggs. In insects, an ovipositor consists of a maximum of three pairs of appendages. The details and morphology of the ovipositor vary, but typically its form is adapted to functions such as preparing a place for the egg, transmitting the egg, and then placing it. For most insects, the organ is used to attach the egg to a surface however for many parasitic species, primarily in wasps and other Hymenoptera, it is also a piercing organ.

Some ovipositors partially retract when not in use. The basal part that protrudes is known as the scape or oviscape, the word scape deriving from the Latin word scāpus, meaning "stalk" or "shaft".

== In insects ==
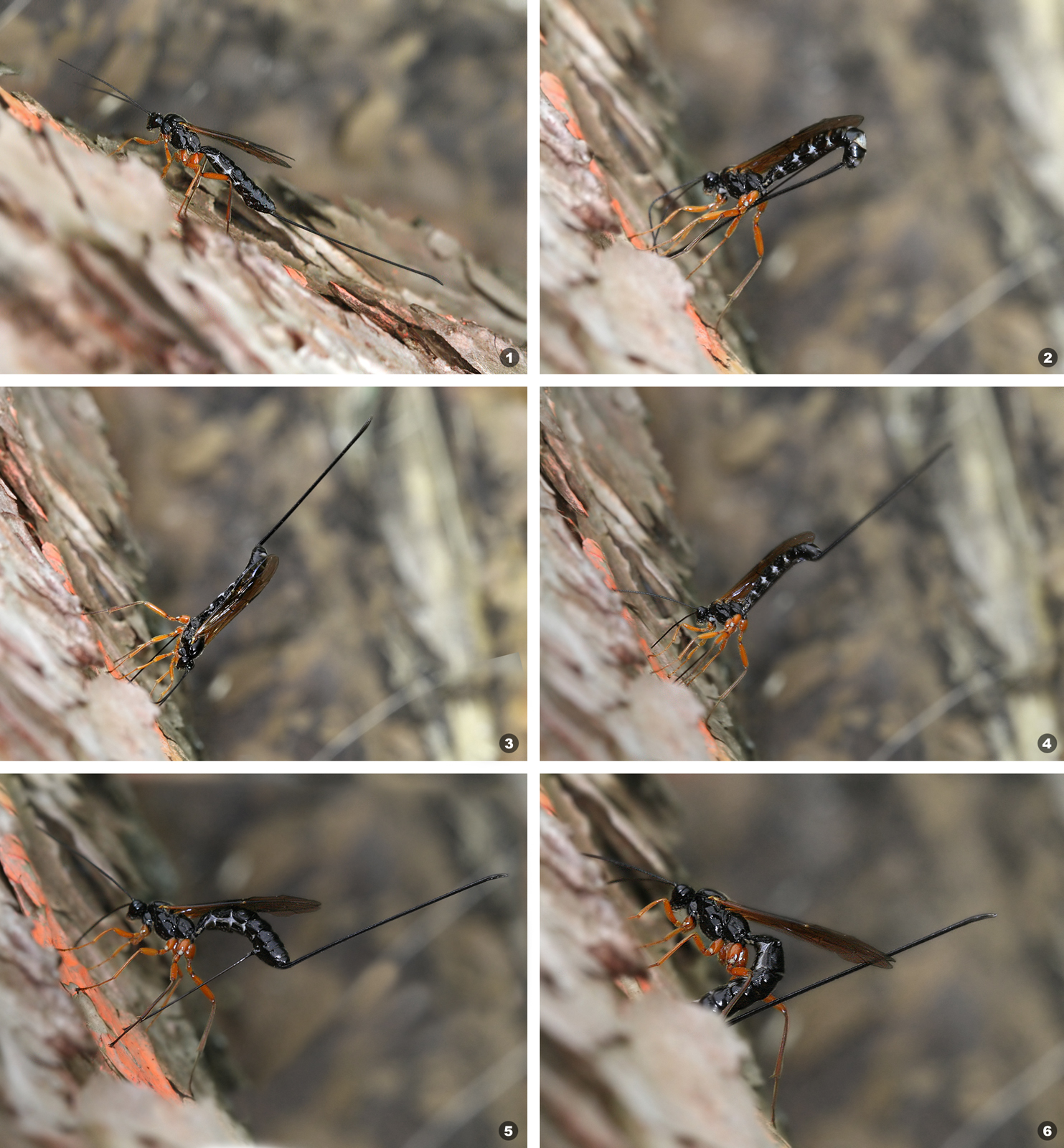
The process of oviposition in Dolichomitus sp.: 1. Tapping with her antennae, the wasp listens for the vibrations that indicate a host is present; 2. With the longer ovipositor, the wasp drills a hole through the bark; 3. The wasp inserts the ovipositor into the cavity which contains the host larva; 4. Making corrections; 5. Depositing the eggs

Grasshoppers use their ovipositors to force a burrow into the earth to receive the eggs. Cicadas pierce the wood of twigs with their ovipositors to insert the eggs. Sawflies slit the tissues of plants with their ovipositor as do some species of long-horned grasshoppers. In the ichneumon wasp genus Megarhyssa, the females have a slender ovipositor (terebra) several inches long that is used to drill into the wood of tree trunks. These wasps are parasitic in the larval stage on the larvae of horntail wasps, hence the egg must be deposited directly into the host's body as it is feeding. The ovipositors of Megarhyssa are among the longest egg-laying organs (relative to body size) known.

The stingers of the Aculeata (wasps, hornets, bees, and ants) are ovipositors, highly modified and with associated venom glands. They are used to paralyze prey, or as defensive weapons. The penetrating sting plus venom allows the wasp to lay eggs with less risk of injury from the host. In some cases, the injection also introduces virus particles that suppress the host's immune system and prevent it from destroying the eggs. However, in virtually all stinging Hymenoptera, the ovipositor is no longer used for egg-laying. An exception is the family Chrysididae, members of the Hymenoptera, in which species such as Chrysis ignita have reduced stinging apparatus and a functional ovipositor.

Fig wasp ovipositors have specialized serrated teeth to penetrate fruits, but gall wasps have either uniform teeth or no teeth on their ovipositors, meaning the morphology of the organ is related to the life history.

Members of the Dipteran (fly) families Tephritidae and Pyrgotidae have well-developed ovipositors that are partly retracted when not in use, with the part that sticks out being the oviscape. Oestridae, another family within Diptera, often have short hairy ovipositors, the species Cuterebra fontinella has one of the shortest within the family.

Ovipositors exist not only in winged insects, but also in Apterygota, where the ovipositor has an additional function in gathering the spermatophore during mating. Little is known about the egg-laying habits of these insects in the wild.

== In fish ==
Female bitterlings in the genus Rhodeus have an ovipositor in the form of a tubular extension of the genital orifice. During breeding season, they use it when depositing eggs in the mantle cavity of freshwater mussels, where their eggs develop in reasonable security. Seahorses have an ovipositor for introducing eggs into the brood pouch of the male, who carries them until it is time to release the fry into a suitable situation in the open water.

== In amphibians ==
The marbled newt, or Triturus marmoratus, females participate in parental investment by ovipositing their eggs. They carefully wrap them in aquatic leaves as a form of protection, scattering them throughout a pond to avoid predation. Females are not able to breathe during the oviposition process; therefore, the benefit to wrapping the eggs outweigh the cost of holding their breath.

== Images ==
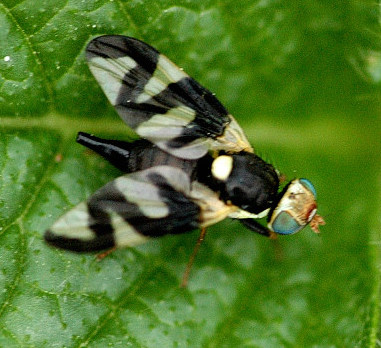
A female fly in the family Tephritidae, with the ovipositor retracted and only the scape showing.

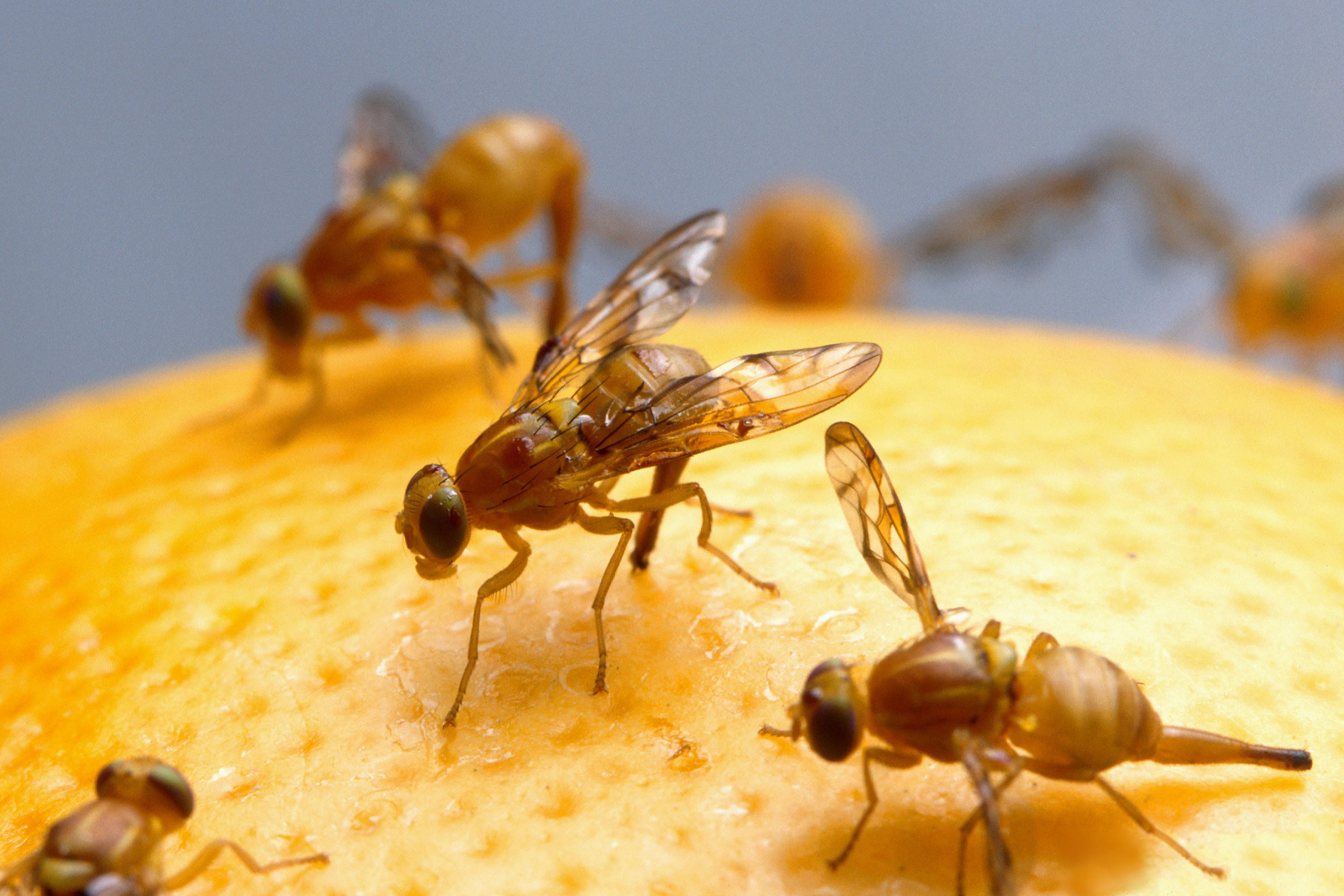
Ovipositing Mexican fruit flies showing the scapes of the extended ovipositors.

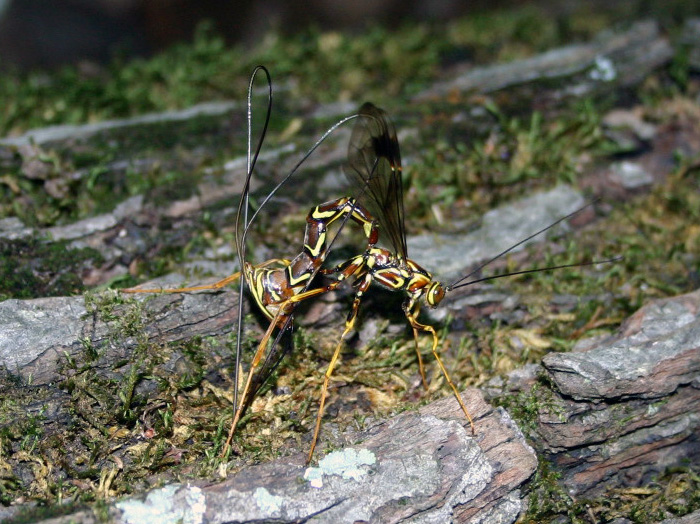
Female Megarhyssa laying eggs with her ovipositor.

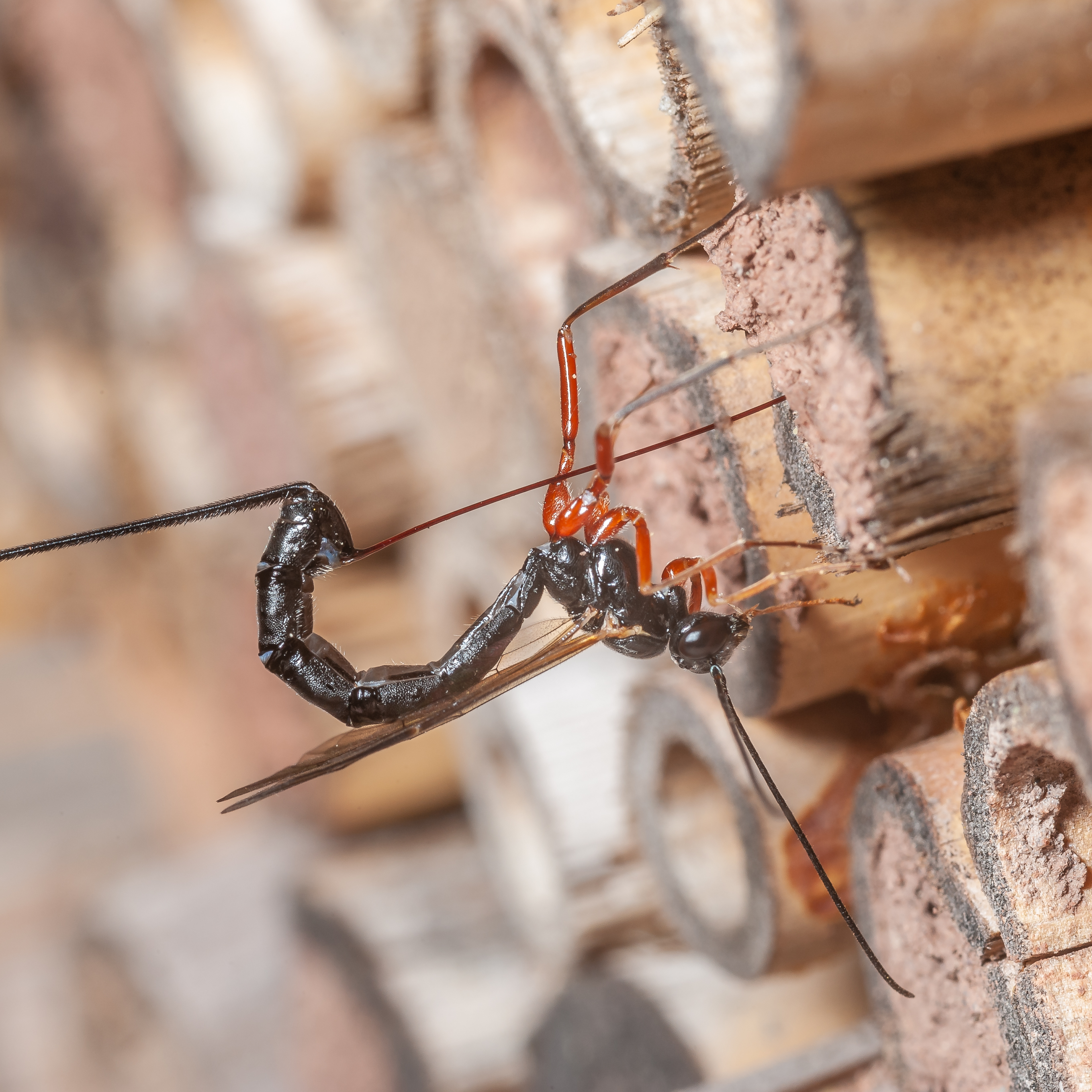
Dolichomitus sp. laying eggs into a nest of Osmia sp..

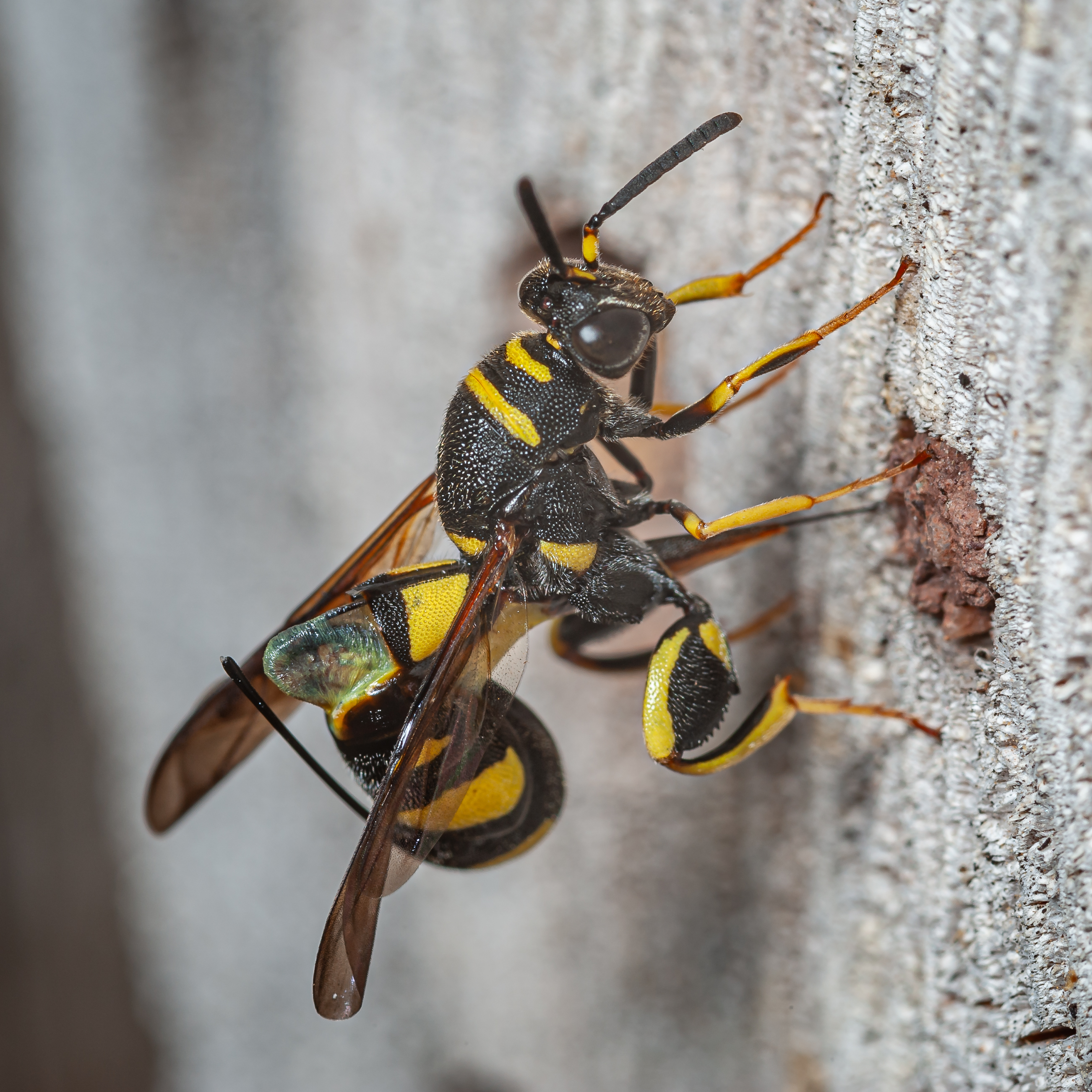
Leucospis dorsigera laying eggs into a nest of Osmia sp..

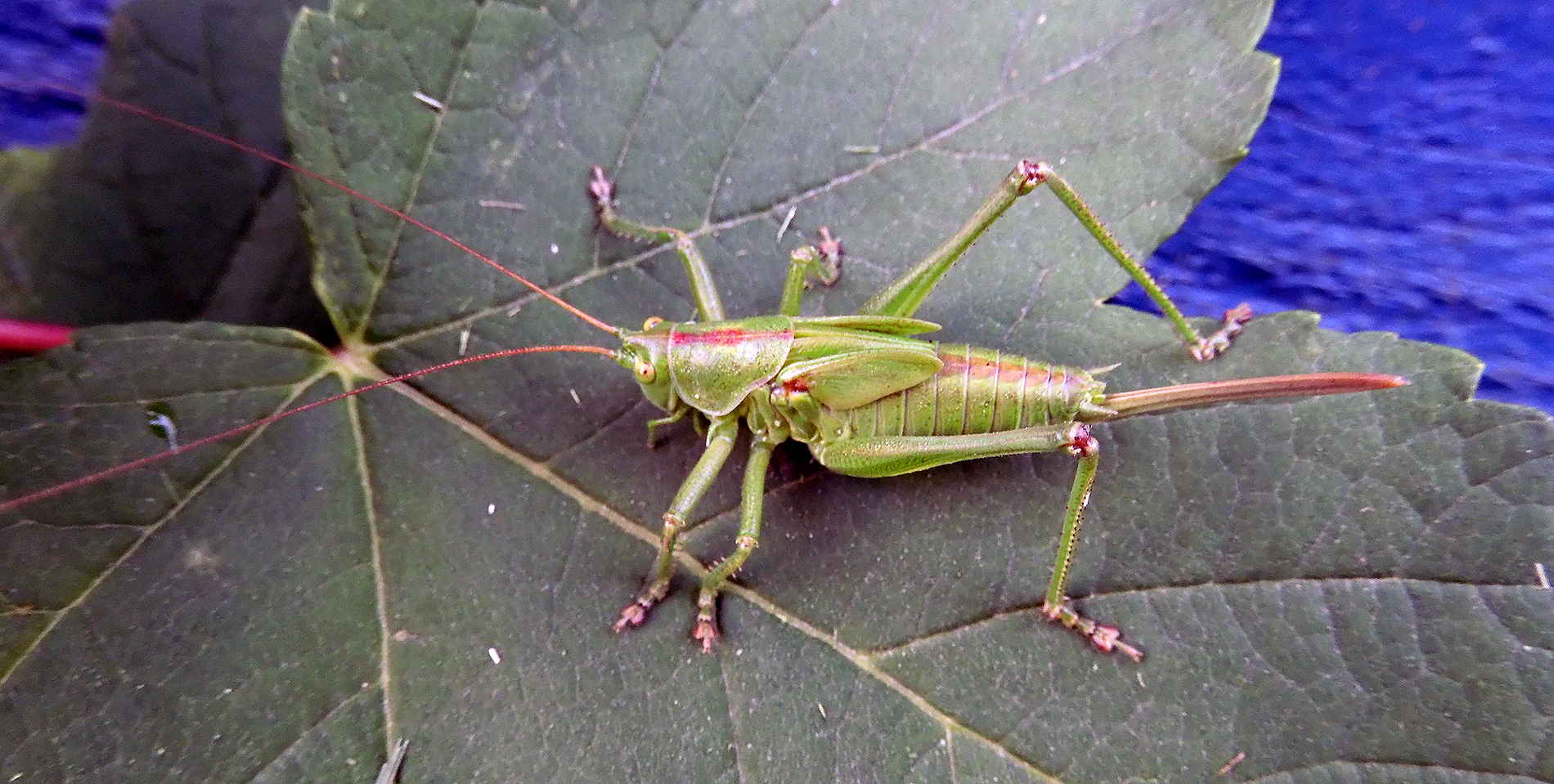
A young female of great green bush-cricket (Tettigonia viridissima) the ovipositor is clearly visible.
