= NGQ =

NGQ or ngq may refer to:

- NGQ, the IATA code for Ngari Gunsa Airport, Ngari Prefecture, Tibet, China
- ngq, the ISO 639-3 code for Ngoreme language, Tanzania
- ngq (IPA: ŋǃʱ), a voiced nasal click in the Xhosa, Zulu, Hadza, and Northern Ndebele languages of southern Africa
- Bantang Station (Chinese: 板塘), a train station in Xiangtan, China on the Changsha–Zhuzhou–Xiangtan intercity railway
- Acropimpla, a genus of parasitoid wasps, by Catalogue of Life identifier
- Nangang District, Harbin (Chinese: 南岗区), a district of Harbin, China; see List of administrative divisions of Heilongjiang
