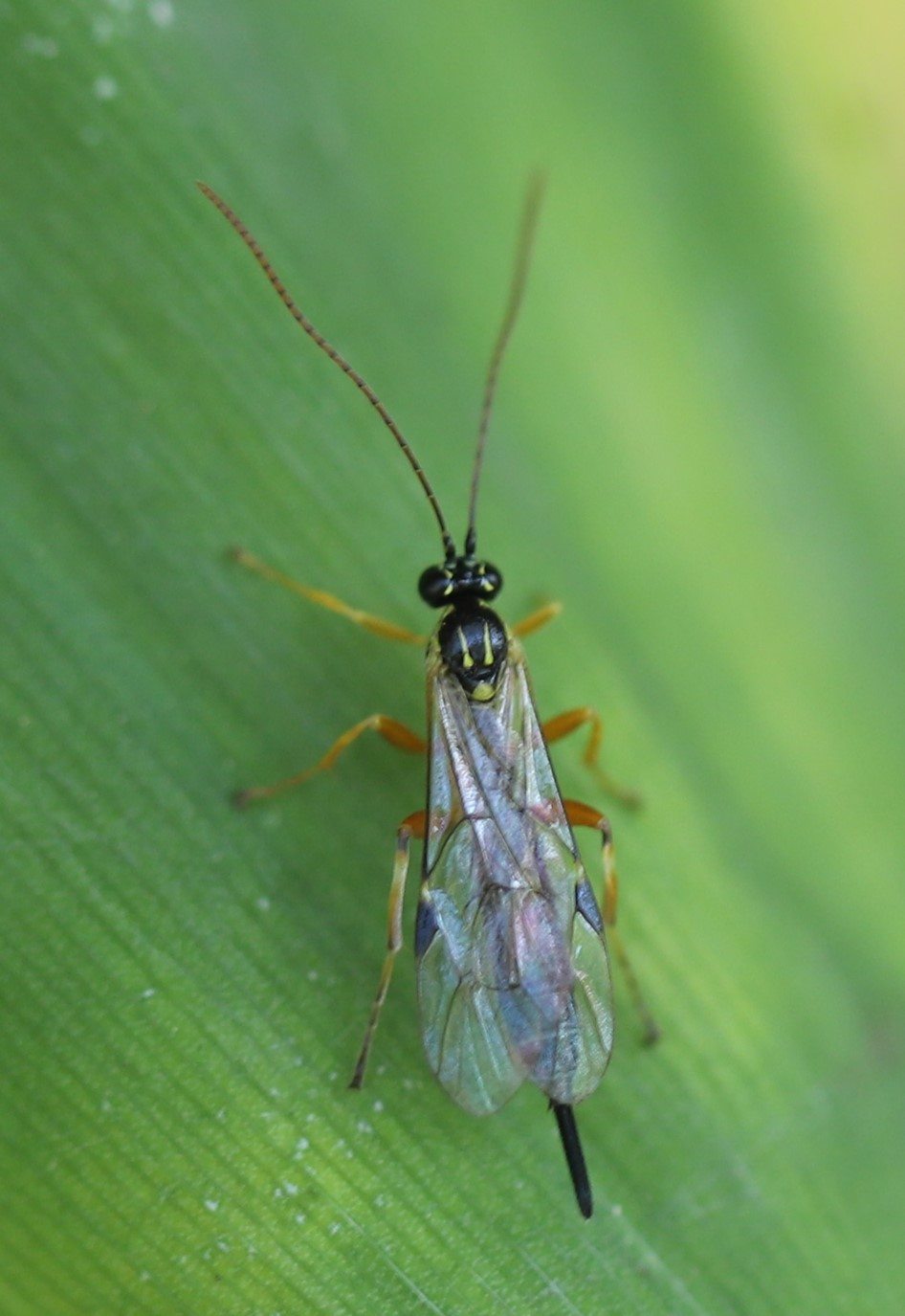
- Apechthis rufata

Scientific classification
- Domain: Eukaryota
- Kingdom: Animalia
- Phylum: Arthropoda
- Class: Insecta
- Order: Hymenoptera
- Family: Ichneumonidae
- Subfamily: Pimplinae
- Tribe: Pimplini
- Genus: Apechthis; Förster, 1869

= Apechthis =

Genus of wasps

Apechthis is a genus of insects belonging to the family Ichneumonidae.

The genus was first described by Arnold Förster in 1869.

The genus has almost cosmopolitan distribution. Body color changes depending on distribution, with yellow Apechthis species found towards the equator.

Species:

- Apechthis cantika Watanabe & Takasuka, 2013 - found in Indonesia
- Apechthis capulifera (Kriechbaumer, 1887)
- Apechthis ontario (Cresson, 1870) - as species name suggests, found in North America
- Apechthis quadridentata (Thomson, 1877)
- Apechthis rapae (Uchida, 1925) - found in South Korea, Japan, and Russia
- Apechthis rufata (Gmelin, 1790)
- Apechthis taiwana Uchida, 1928 - found in southern China and Taiwan.
