= Gregopimpla =

Scientific classification
- Kingdom: Animalia
- Phylum: Arthropoda
- Class: Insecta
- Order: Hymenoptera
- Family: Ichneumonidae
- Tribe: Ephialtini
- Genus: Gregopimpla; Momoi, 1965

Genus of insects

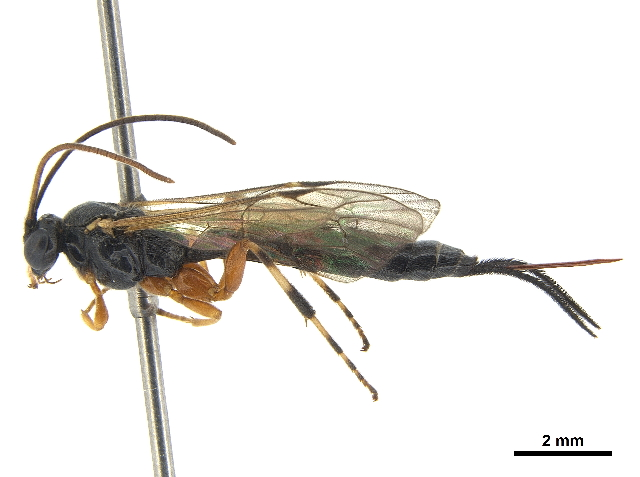
Gregopimpla himalayensis

Gregopimpla is a genus of parasitoid wasps belonging to the family Ichneumonidae. The species of this genus are found in Europe and Northern America.

== Select species ==
There are at least 8 species of Gregopimpla:

- Gregopimpla anjana (Gupta & Tikar, 1976)
- Gregopimpla bernuthii (Hartig, 1838)
- Gregopimpla himalayensis (Cameron, 1899)
- Gregopimpla inquisitor (Scopoli, 1763)
- Gregopimpla kuwanae (Viereck, 1912)
- Gregopimpla malacosomae (Seyrig, 1927)
- Gregopimpla parvata (Gupta & Tikar, 1976)
- Gregopimpla ussuriensis Kasparyan, 2007
