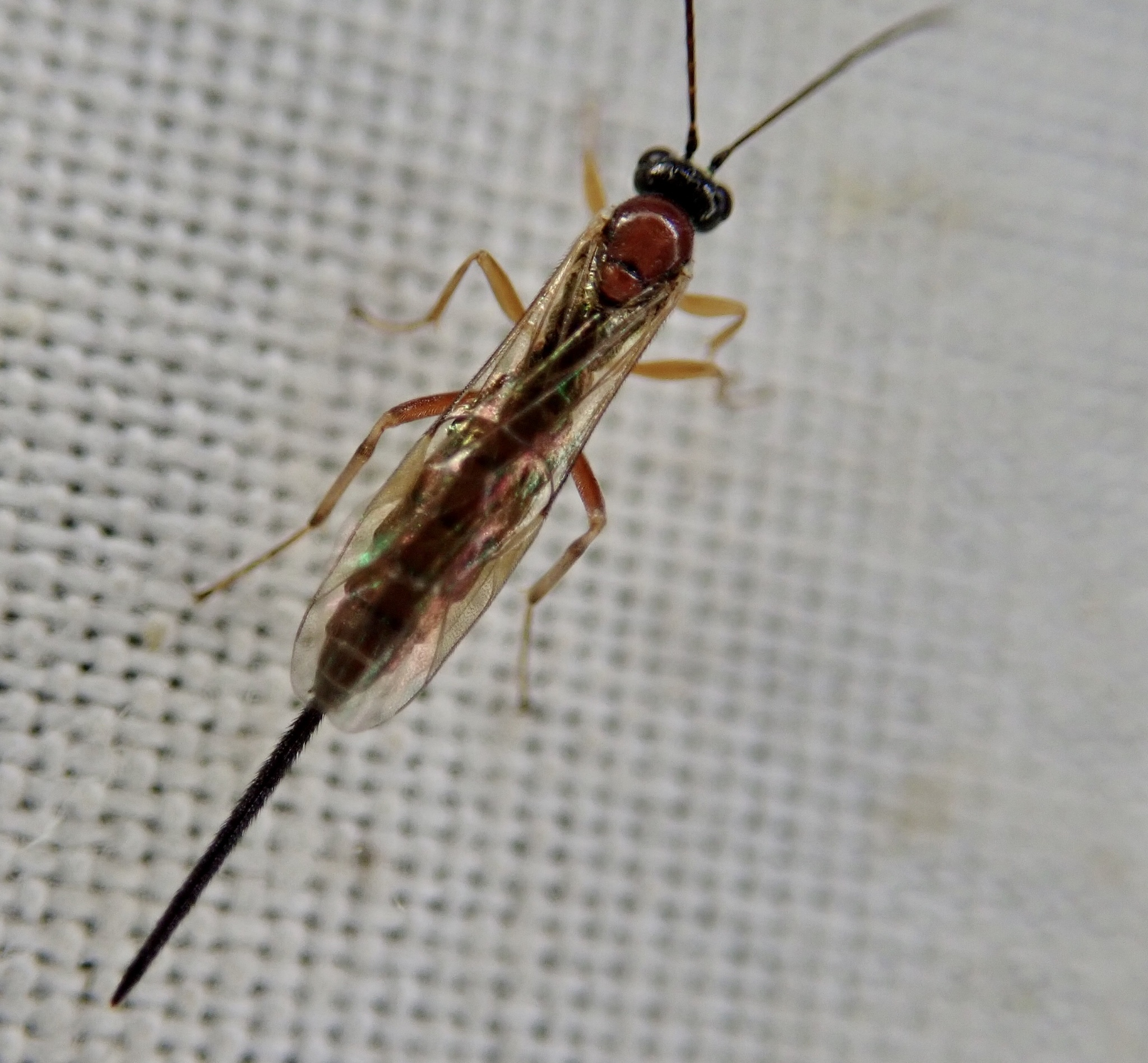
- Scambus pomorum

Scientific classification
- Kingdom: Animalia
- Phylum: Arthropoda
- Class: Insecta
- Order: Hymenoptera
- Family: Ichneumonidae
- Subfamily: Pimplinae
- Tribe: Ephialtini
- Genus: Scambus; Hartig, 1838

Species
- Several, including: Scambus amazonicus; Scambus annulatus; Scambus calobatus; Scambus elegans; Scambus incanus; Scambus nigricans; Scambus sagax

= Scambus =

Genus of wasps

Scambus is a genus of wasps. Species are found in Europe, the Middle East (Turkey), and South America (Peru).
