= Afrephialtes =

Scientific classification
- Kingdom: Animalia
- Phylum: Arthropoda
- Class: Insecta
- Order: Hymenoptera
- Family: Ichneumonidae
- Subfamily: Pimplinae
- Genus: Afrephialtes; Benoit, 1963

Type species
- Afrephialtes navus Tosquinet, 1896

Synonyms
- Flavopimpla Betrem, 1932

Genus of wasp

Afrephialtes is a genus of wasp under the family Pimplinae.

== Description ==
Afrephialtes are parasitic wasps. Their hosts include the following species:

- Cryptorhynchus lapathi (the willow weevil)
- Hypsipyla robusta (the cedar tip moth)
- Ostrinia kasmirica
- Sesia spheciformis
- Synanthedon formicaeformis (the red-tipped clearwing)

== Distribution ==
This species is primarily found in the West African countries of Guinea, Liberia, and Sierra Leone. It is also found intersparsed in the Palaearctic and Indo-Australian regions.

== Species ==
This genus contains the following 14 species:

- Afrephialtes balteatus Baltazar, 1961
- Afrephialtes bicolor Baltazar, 1961
- Afrephialtes brumhus Gupta & Tikar, 1976
- Afrephialtes cicatricosus Ratzeburg, 1848
- Afrephialtes gibberosus Gupta & Tikar, 1976
- Afrephialtes laetiventris Cameron, 1899
- Afrephialtes latiannulatus Cameron, 1907
- Afrephialtes latisulcatus Cameron, 1908
- Afrephialtes lieftincki Gupta & Tikar, 1976
- Afrephialtes montanus Baltazar, 1961
- Afrephialtes navus Tosquinet, 1896
- Afrephialtes robustus Gupta & Tikar, 1976
- Afrephialtes rubitorosus Gupta & Tikar, 1976
- Afrephialtes taiwanus Gupta & Tikar, 1976
