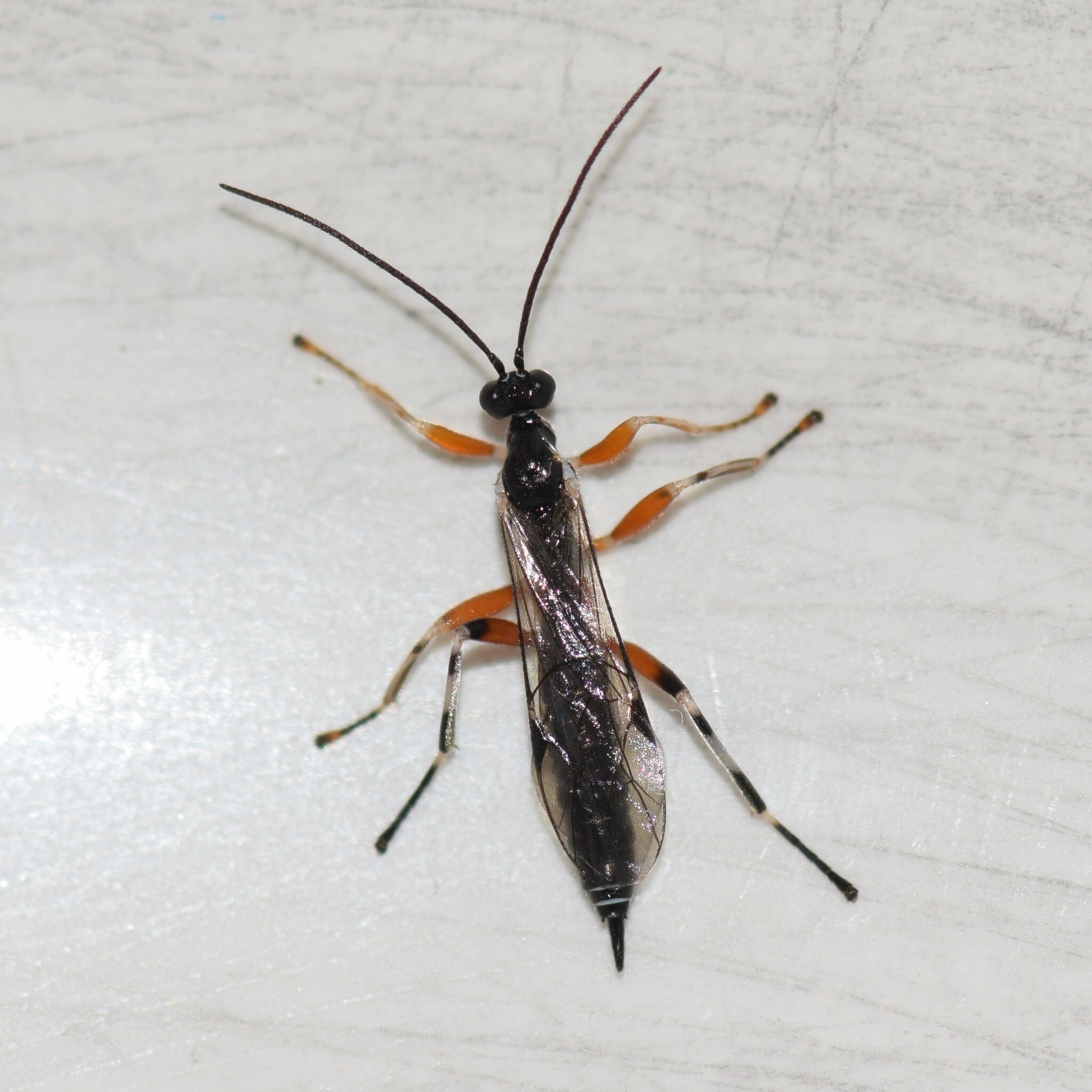
- Oxyrrhexis carbonator

Scientific classification
- Kingdom: Animalia
- Phylum: Arthropoda
- Class: Insecta
- Order: Hymenoptera
- Family: Ichneumonidae
- Subfamily: Pimplinae
- Tribe: Ephialtini

= Ephialtini =

Tribe of wasps

Ephialtini is an unresolved tribe of ichneumon wasps in the family Ichneumonidae. There may be about 53 genera and at least 120 species in Ephialtini.

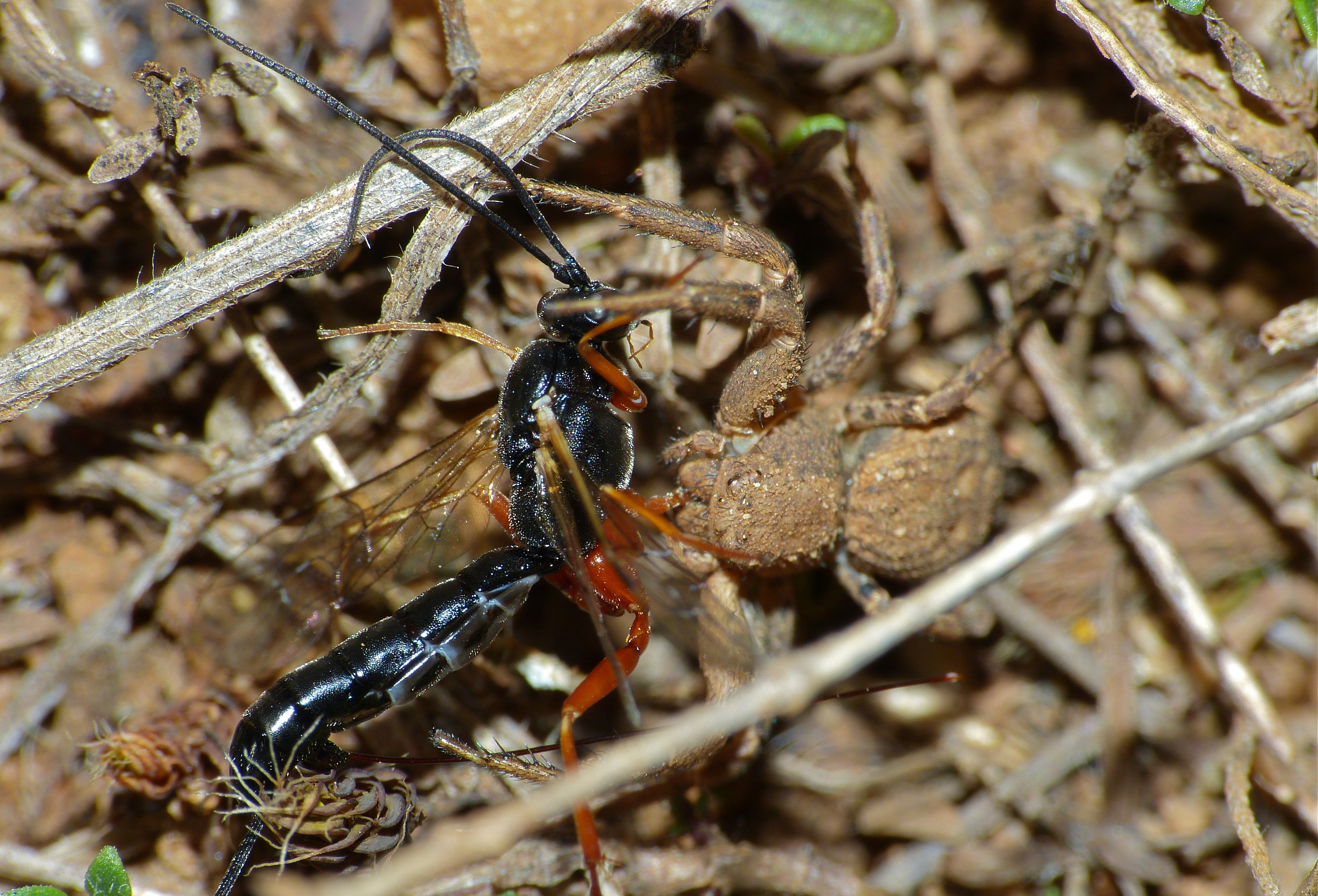
Unidentified Ephialtini female

== Genera ==
These 17 genera belong to the tribe Ephialtini:

- Acropimpla Townes, 1960^{c g b}
- Acrotaphus Townes & Townes, 1960^{c g b}
- Calliephialtes Ashmead, 1900^{c g b}
- Clistopyga Gravenhorst, 1829^{c g b}
- Dolichomitus Smith, 1877^{c g b}
- Endromopoda Hellén, 1939^{c g b}
- Ephialtes Gravenhorst, 1829^{c g b}
- Eruga Townes & Townes, 1960^{c g b}
- Exeristes Förster, 1869^{c g b}
- Iseropus Förster, 1869^{c g b}
- Oxyrrhexis Förster, 1869^{c g b}
- Scambus Hartig, 1838^{g b}
- Schizopyga Gravenhorst, 1829^{c g b}
- Sinarachna Townes, 1960^{c g b}
- Tromatobia Förster, 1869^{c g b}
- Zaglyptus Förster, 1869^{g b}
- Zatypota Förster, 1869^{c g b}

Data sources: c = Catalogue of Life, g = GBIF, b = Bugguide.net
