= Scambus elegans =

Scientific classification
- Domain: Eukaryota
- Kingdom: Animalia
- Phylum: Arthropoda
- Class: Insecta
- Order: Hymenoptera
- Family: Ichneumonidae
- Genus: Scambus
- Species: S. elegans

Binomial name
- Scambus elegans (Woldstedt, 1877)

Synonyms
- Troctocerus elegans Woldstedt 1877; Scambus zagoriensis (Hensch, 1929); Scambus dumeticola (Hensch, 1929); Scambus cottei (Seyrig, 1926); Scambus ulicicida (Morley, 1911); Scambus erythronotus (Forster, 1888); Scambus cingulatellus (Costa, 1885); Scambus albicrus (Rondani, 1877)

Species of wasp

Scambus elegans is a species of parasitic wasp found in Europe. It was described by F.W. Woldstedt in 1877. The larva parasitizes tortricid moth larvae (Eudemis species, Lobesia botrana) in French vine-growing regions (Bordelais).
