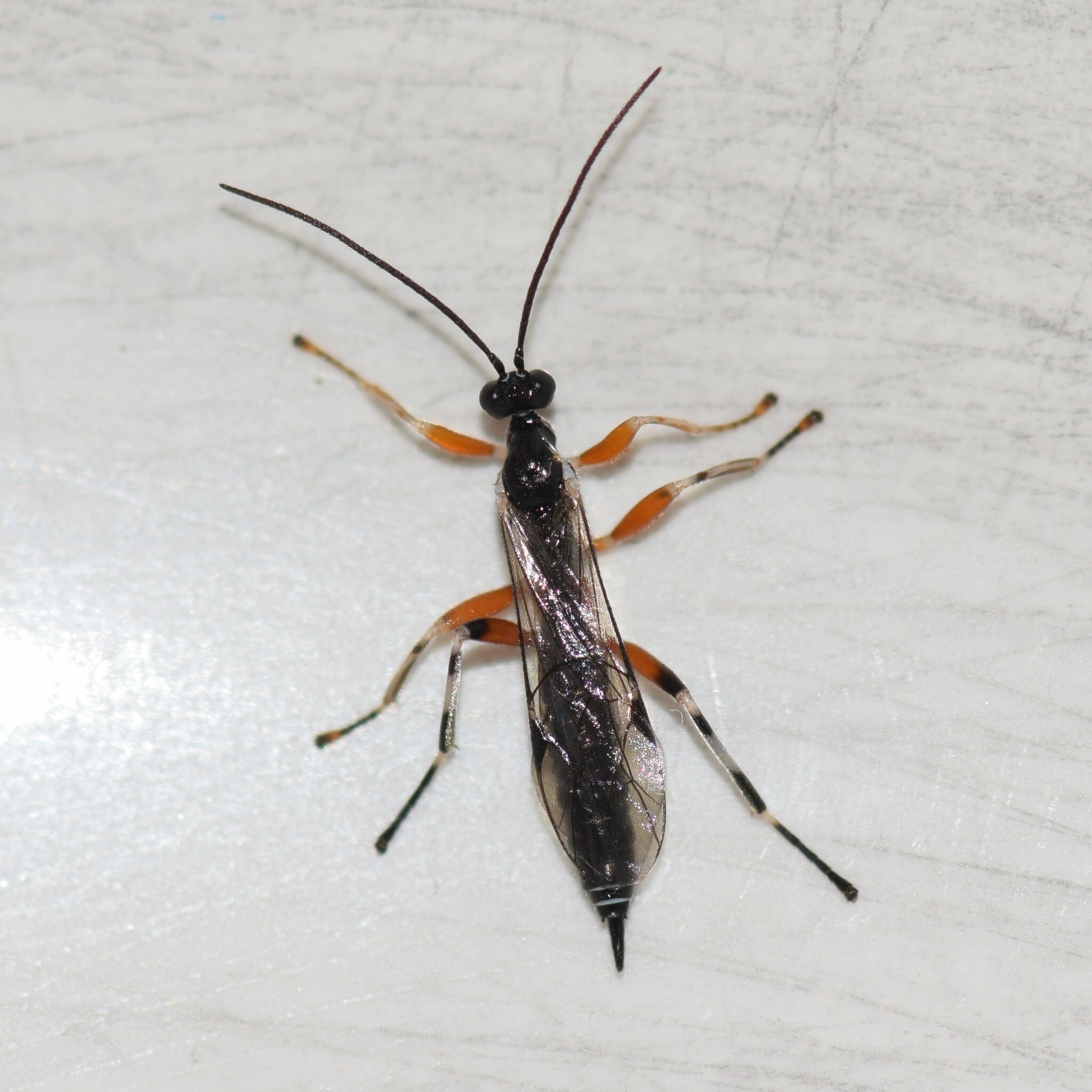

Scientific classification
- Kingdom: Animalia
- Phylum: Arthropoda
- Class: Insecta
- Order: Hymenoptera
- Family: Ichneumonidae
- Genus: Oxyrrhexis
- Species: O. carbonator

Binomial name
- Oxyrrhexis carbonator (Gravenhorst, 1807)

= Oxyrrhexis carbonator =

Species of wasp

Oxyrrhexis carbonator is a species of ichneumon wasp in the family Ichneumonidae. It can be found in Europe and North America. The species is associated with Steatoda bipunctata in Europe and Steatoda borealis in North America.

== Subspecies ==
These three subspecies belong to the species Oxyrrhexis carbonator:

- Oxyrrhexis carbonator carbonator (Gravenhorst, 1807)
- Oxyrrhexis carbonator morio (Kiss, 1929)
- Oxyrrhexis carbonator texana (Cresson, 1870)
