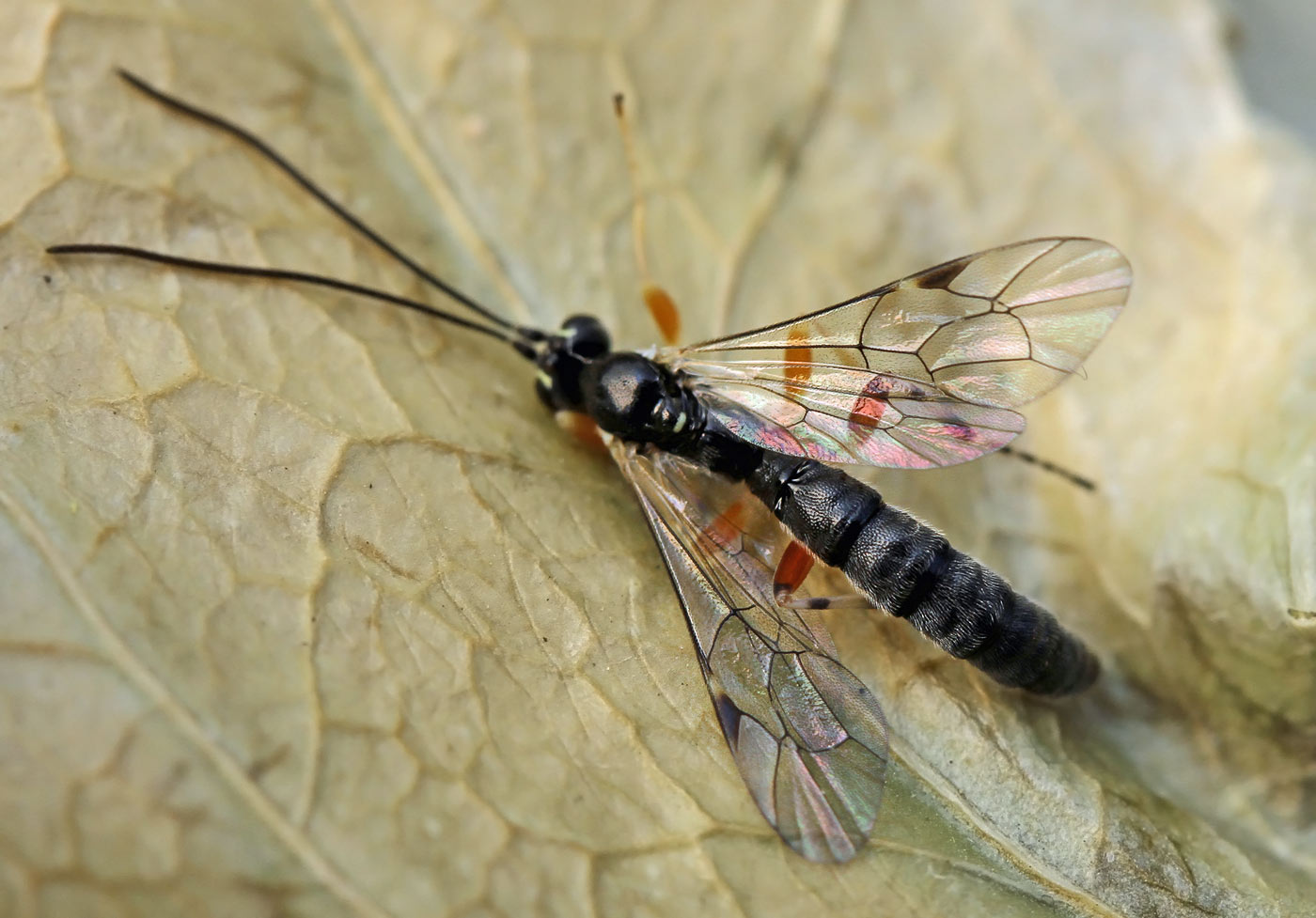

Scientific classification
- Kingdom: Animalia
- Phylum: Arthropoda
- Class: Insecta
- Order: Hymenoptera
- Family: Ichneumonidae
- Genus: Tromatobia
- Species: T. ovivora

Binomial name
- Tromatobia ovivora (Boheman, 1821)

= Tromatobia ovivora =

Species of wasp

Tromatobia ovivora is a species of ichneumon wasp in the family Ichneumonidae.

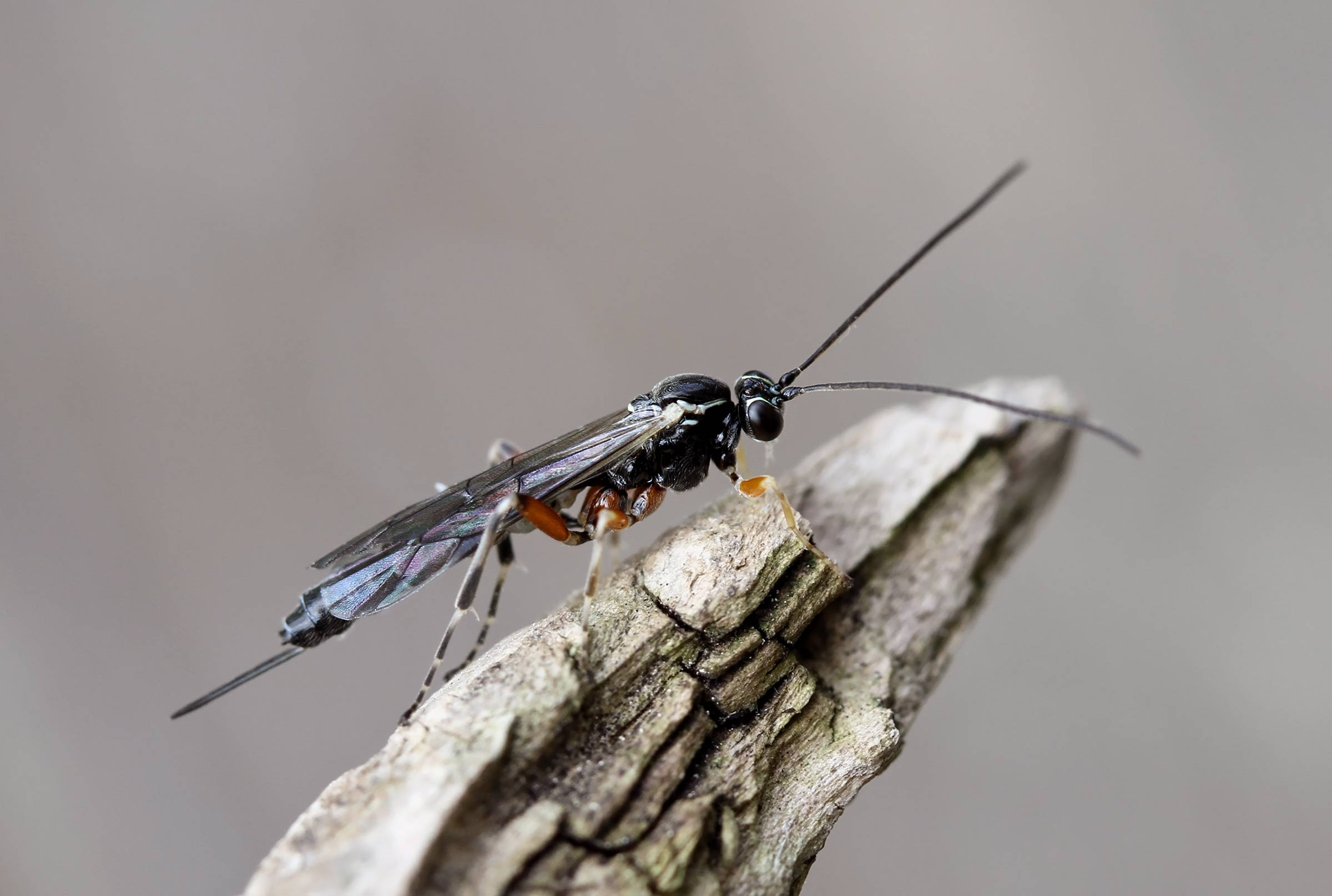
