= Eruga =

Scientific classification
- Kingdom: Animalia
- Phylum: Arthropoda
- Class: Insecta
- Order: Hymenoptera
- Family: Ichneumonidae
- Tribe: Ephialtini
- Genus: Eruga; Townes & Townes, 1960

Type species
- Eruga lineata Townes & Townes, 1960

Genus of wasps

Eruga is a genus of ichneumon wasps in the tribe Ephialtini. Some of its species are parasites of spiders in the families Tetragnathidae and Linyphiidae. It consists of approximately 15 species, found in the Afrotropical, Nearctic and Neotropical regions.
