= Atractogaster =

Scientific classification
- Domain: Eukaryota
- Kingdom: Animalia
- Phylum: Arthropoda
- Class: Insecta
- Order: Hymenoptera
- Family: Ichneumonidae
- Genus: Atractogaster; Kriechbaumer, 1872

Genus of insects

Atractogaster is a genus of parasitoid wasps belonging to the family Ichneumonidae.

The species of this genus are found in Europe.

Species:

- Atractogaster semisculptus Kriechbaumer, 1872
