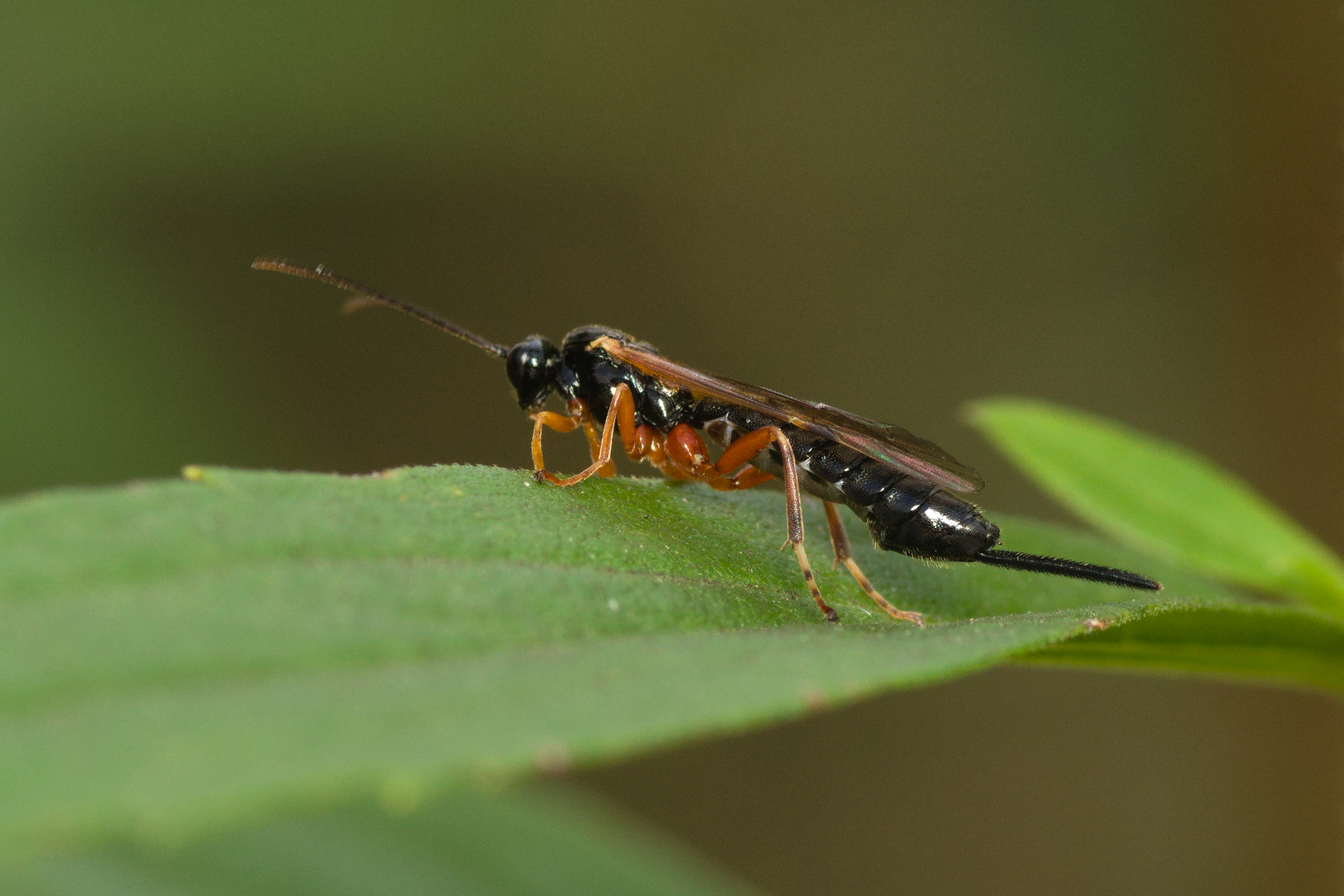
- Endromopoda detrita

Scientific classification
- Domain: Eukaryota
- Kingdom: Animalia
- Phylum: Arthropoda
- Class: Insecta
- Order: Hymenoptera
- Family: Ichneumonidae
- Tribe: Ephialtini
- Genus: Endromopoda; Hellén, 1939

= Endromopoda =

Genus of wasps

Endromopoda is a genus of ichneumon wasps in the family Ichneumonidae. There are about 12 described species in Endromopoda.

== Species ==
These 12 species belong to the genus Endromopoda:

- Endromopoda annulitarsis (Ashmead, 1906)^{c g}
- Endromopoda appendiculata Constantineanu & Pisica, 1977^{c g}
- Endromopoda arundinator (Fabricius, 1804)^{c g}
- Endromopoda detrita (Holmgren, 1860)^{c g}
- Endromopoda lithocolletidis (Ashmead, 1890)^{c g}
- Endromopoda nigricoxis (Ulbricht, 1910)^{c g}
- Endromopoda nitida (Brauns, 1898)^{c g}
- Endromopoda perparvula (Kusigemati, 1985)^{c g}
- Endromopoda phragmitidis (Perkins, 1957)^{c g}
- Endromopoda phragmitis (Perkins, 1957)^{g}
- Endromopoda producta (Walley, 1960)^{c g b}
- Endromopoda rubescens (Walley, 1960)^{c g}

Data sources: i = ITIS, c = Catalogue of Life, g = GBIF, b = Bugguide.net
