= Delomerista =

Scientific classification
- Domain: Eukaryota
- Kingdom: Animalia
- Phylum: Arthropoda
- Class: Insecta
- Order: Hymenoptera
- Family: Ichneumonidae
- Genus: Delomerista; Förster, 1869

Genus of wasps

Delomerista is a genus of parasitoid wasps belonging to the family Ichneumonidae.

The species of this genus are found in Eurasia, Southern Africa and North America.

Species:

- Delomerista borealis Walkley, 1960
- Delomerista mandibularis (Gravenhorst, 1829)
