= Iseropus =

Scientific classification
- Domain: Eukaryota
- Kingdom: Animalia
- Phylum: Arthropoda
- Class: Insecta
- Order: Hymenoptera
- Family: Ichneumonidae
- Tribe: Ephialtini
- Genus: Iseropus; Förster, 1869

Genus of wasps

Iseropus is a genus of ichneumon wasps in the family Ichneumonidae. There are about nine described species in Iseropus.

== Species ==
These nine species belong to the genus Iseropus:

- Iseropus barqueroi Gauld, 1991^{c g}
- Iseropus californiensis Cushman, 1940^{c}
- Iseropus coelebs (Walsh, 1873)^{c g b}
- Iseropus gulensis Bustillo, 1975^{c g}
- Iseropus hylesiae Kasparyan, 2006^{c g}
- Iseropus orientalis Uchida, 1928^{c g}
- Iseropus pilosus (Cameron, 1903)^{c}
- Iseropus serranoi Gauld, Ugalde & Hanson, 1998^{c g}
- Iseropus stercorator (Fabricius, 1793)^{c g b}

Data sources: i = ITIS, c = Catalogue of Life, g = GBIF, b = Bugguide.net
