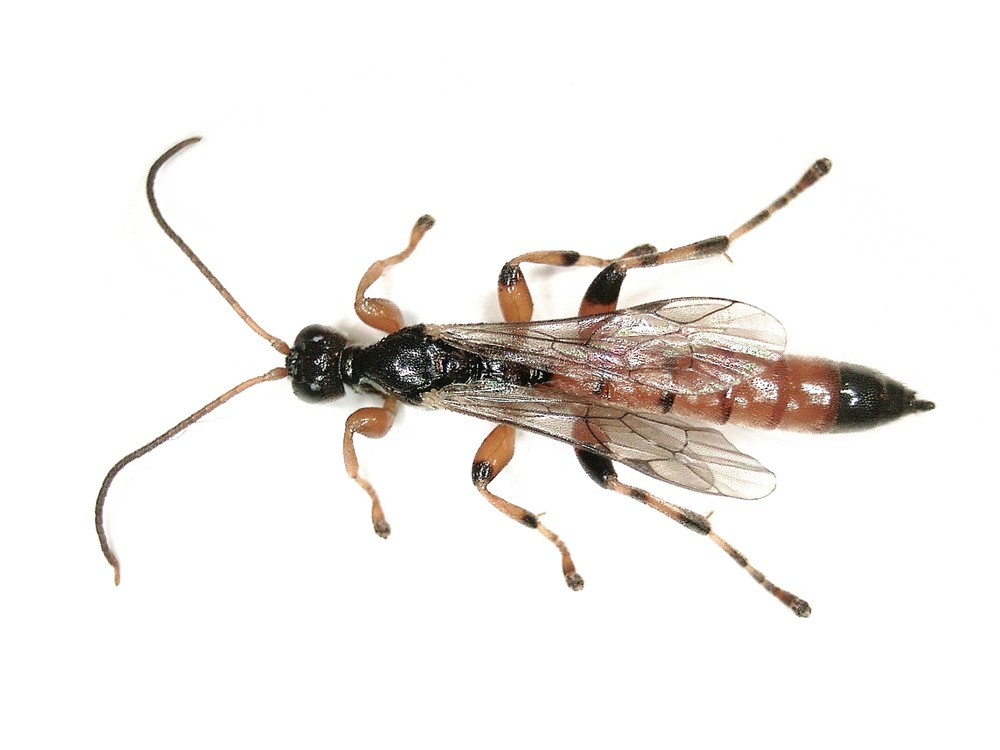
- Schizopyga circulator

Scientific classification
- Domain: Eukaryota
- Kingdom: Animalia
- Phylum: Arthropoda
- Class: Insecta
- Order: Hymenoptera
- Family: Ichneumonidae
- Tribe: Ephialtini
- Genus: Schizopyga; Gravenhorst, 1829

= Schizopyga =

Genus of wasps

Schizopyga is a genus of ichneumon wasps in the family Ichneumonidae. There are about 10 described species in Schizopyga.

== Species ==
These 10 species belong to the genus Schizopyga:

- Schizopyga anseli Fernandez, 2007^{c g}
- Schizopyga circulator (Panzer, 1800)^{c g}
- Schizopyga congica (Benoit, 1953)^{c g}
- Schizopyga coxator Constantineanu, 1973^{c g}
- Schizopyga curvicauda (Seyrig, 1935)^{c g}
- Schizopyga flavifrons Holmgren, 1856^{c g}
- Schizopyga frigida Cresson, 1870^{c g b}
- Schizopyga nitida Kasparyan, 1976^{c g}
- Schizopyga podagrica Gravenhorst, 1829^{c g}
- Schizopyga varipes Holmgren, 1856^{c g}

Data sources: i = ITIS, c = Catalogue of Life, g = GBIF, b = Bugguide.net
