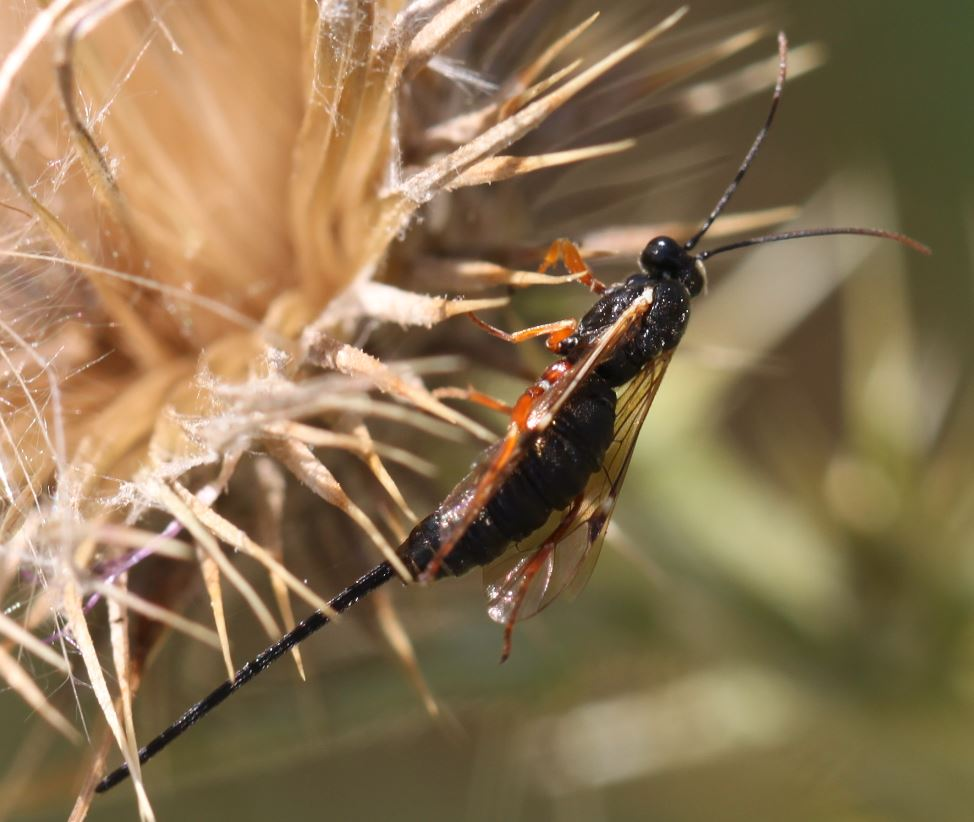
- Exeristes roborator

Scientific classification
- Domain: Eukaryota
- Kingdom: Animalia
- Phylum: Arthropoda
- Class: Insecta
- Order: Hymenoptera
- Family: Ichneumonidae
- Tribe: Ephialtini
- Genus: Exeristes; Förster, 1869

= Exeristes =

Genus of wasps

Exeristes is a genus of ichneumon wasps in the family Ichneumonidae. There are about nine described species in Exeristes.

== Species ==
These nine species belong to the genus Exeristes:

- Exeristes arundinis (Kriechbaumer, 1887)^{c g}
- Exeristes comstockii (Cresson, 1880)^{c g b}
- Exeristes denticulator Aubert, 1983^{c g}
- Exeristes kamrupa (Gupta & Tikar, 1976)^{c g}
- Exeristes longiseta (Ratzeburg, 1844)^{c g}
- Exeristes montanus Constantineanu & Pisica, 1970^{c g}
- Exeristes roborator (Fabricius, 1793)^{c g}
- Exeristes ruficollis (Gravenhorst, 1829)^{c}
- Exeristes shanxiensis Wang, 2000^{c g}

Data sources: i = ITIS, c = Catalogue of Life, g = GBIF, b = Bugguide.net
