= Sinarachna =

Scientific classification
- Domain: Eukaryota
- Kingdom: Animalia
- Phylum: Arthropoda
- Class: Insecta
- Order: Hymenoptera
- Family: Ichneumonidae
- Tribe: Ephialtini
- Genus: Sinarachna; Townes, 1960

Genus of wasps

Sinarachna is a genus of ichneumon wasps in the family Ichneumonidae. There are about five described species in Sinarachna.

== Species ==
These five species belong to the genus Sinarachna:

- Sinarachna anomala (Holmgren, 1860)^{g}
- Sinarachna ceylonica (Ashmead, 1896)^{c g}
- Sinarachna nigricornis (Holmgren, 1860)^{c g}
- Sinarachna pallipes (Holmgren, 1860)^{c b}
- Sinarachna tropica (Morley, 1912)^{c g}

Data sources: i = ITIS, c = Catalogue of Life, g = GBIF, b = Bugguide.net
