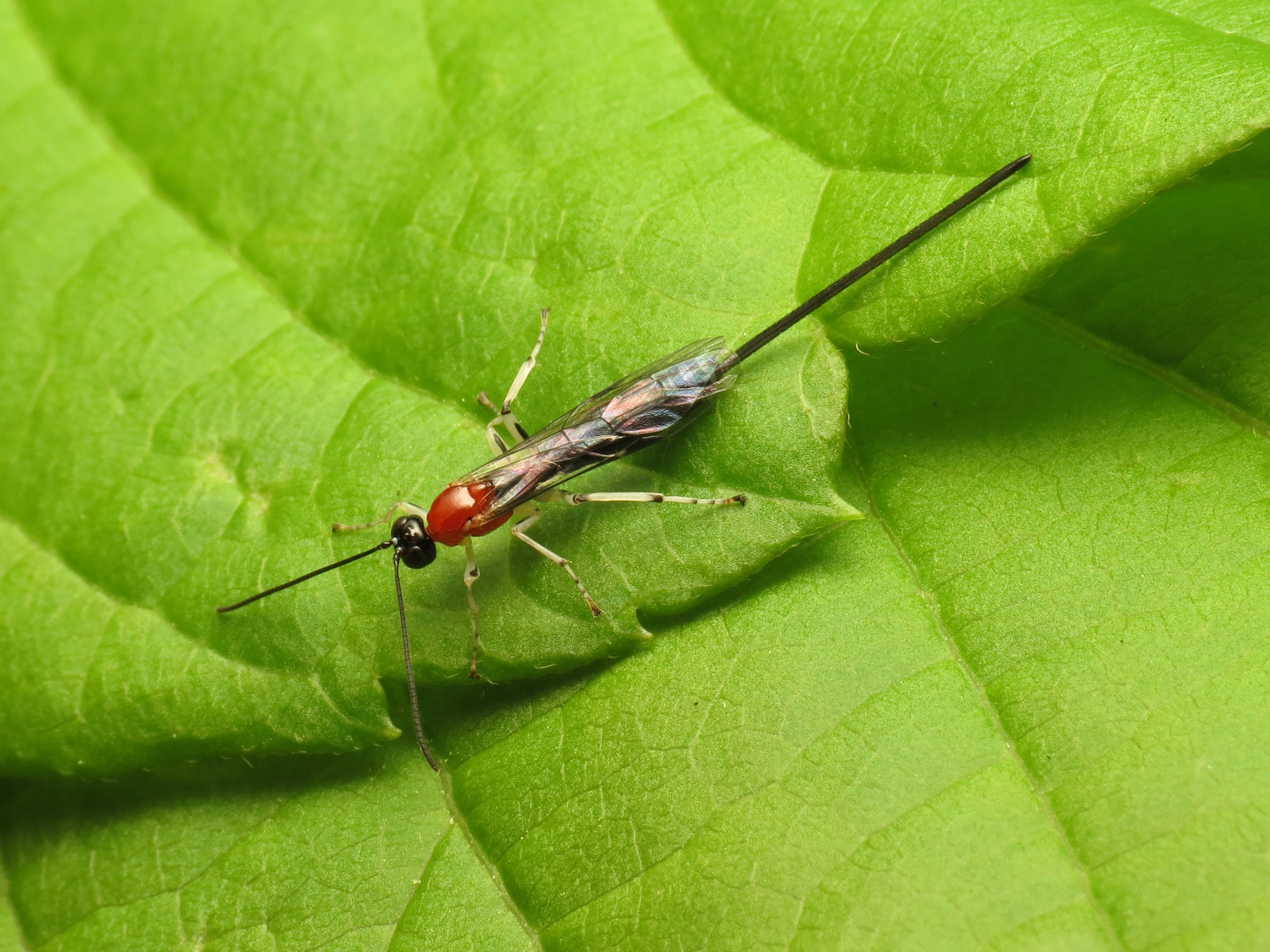
- Calliephialtes grapholithae

Scientific classification
- Kingdom: Animalia
- Phylum: Arthropoda
- Class: Insecta
- Order: Hymenoptera
- Family: Ichneumonidae
- Tribe: Ephialtini
- Genus: Calliephialtes; Ashmead, 1900

= Calliephialtes =

Genus of wasps

Calliephialtes is a genus of ichneumonid wasps in the family Ichneumonidae. There are 22 described species in Calliephialtes.

== Species ==
There are 22 species belonging to the genus Calliephialtes:

- Calliephialtes argentinus Blanchard, 1936^{c g}
- Calliephialtes bicolor (Brulle, 1846)^{c g}
- Calliephialtes braconoides (Spinola, 1851)^{c g}
- Calliephialtes coxatus (Smith, 1879)^{c g}
- Calliephialtes deyanirae Gauld, 1991^{c g}
- Calliephialtes dimorphus Cushman, 1938^{c g}
- Calliephialtes exilis (Brulle, 1846)^{c g}
- Calliephialtes ferrugineus Cushman, 1940
- Calliephialtes grapholithae (Cresson, 1890)
- Calliephialtes guevarae Gauld, 1991^{c g}
- Calliephialtes ledezmae Gauld, Ugalde & Hanson, 1998^{c g}
- Calliephialtes lopezi Gauld, 1991^{c g}
- Calliephialtes marjorieae Gauld, 1991^{c g}
- Calliephialtes mattai Porter, 1979^{c g}
- Calliephialtes minutus (Brulle, 1846)^{c g}
- Calliephialtes notandus (Cresson, 1870)
- Calliephialtes perpulcher (Schrottky, 1902)^{c g}
- Calliephialtes picadoi Gauld, 1991^{c g}
- Calliephialtes rojasi Gauld, Ugalde & Hanson, 1998^{c g}
- Calliephialtes ruizi Gauld, 1991^{c g}
- Calliephialtes sittenfeldae Gauld, Ugalde & Hanson, 1998^{c g}
- Calliephialtes thurberiae Cushman, 1915

Data sources: c = Catalogue of Life, g = GBIF

== Gallery ==
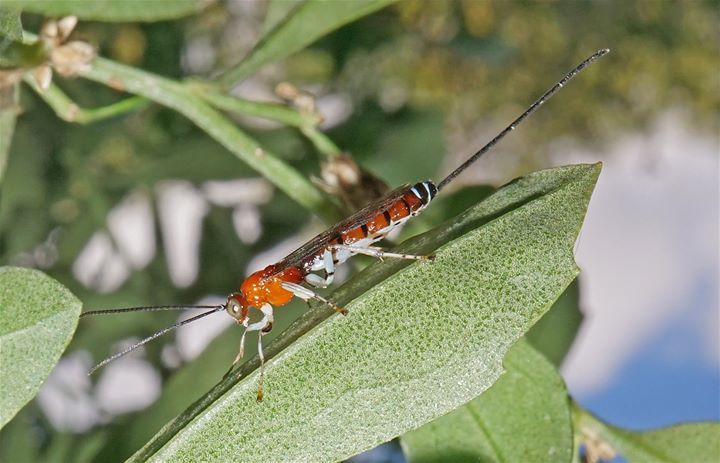
Calliephialtes ferrugineus female

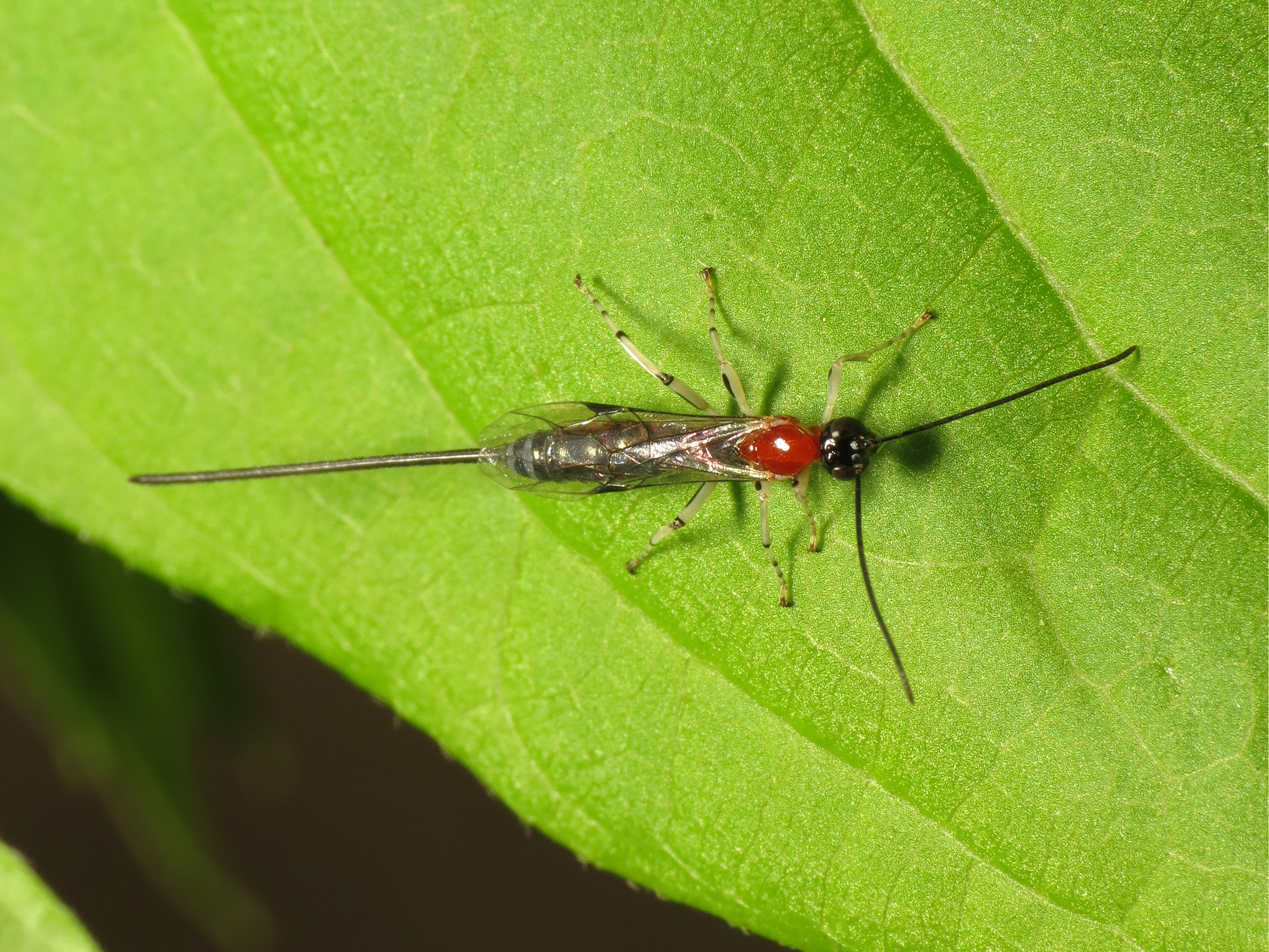
Calliephialtes grapholithae female

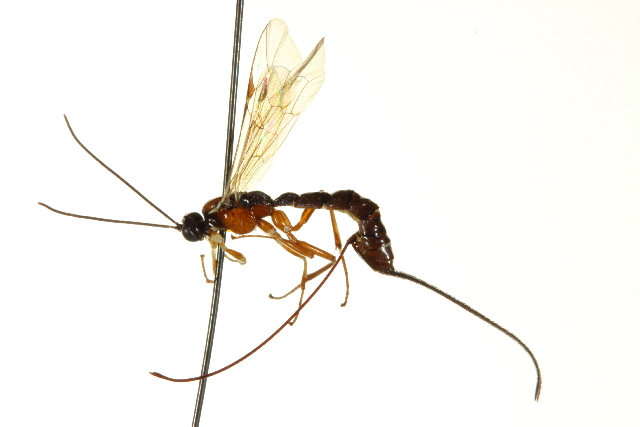
Calliephialtes notandus female

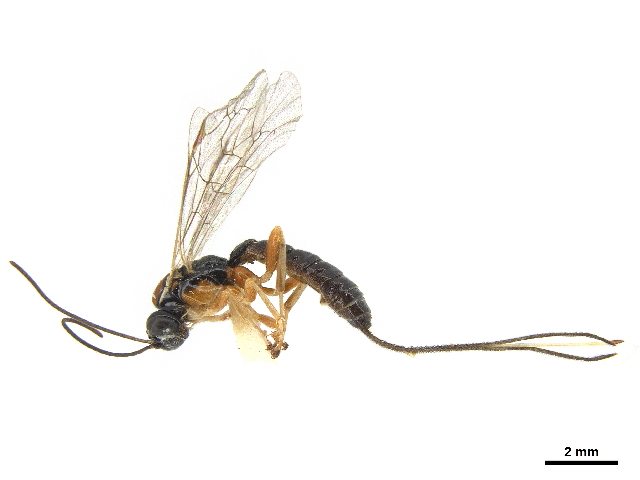
Calliephialtes thurberiae female
