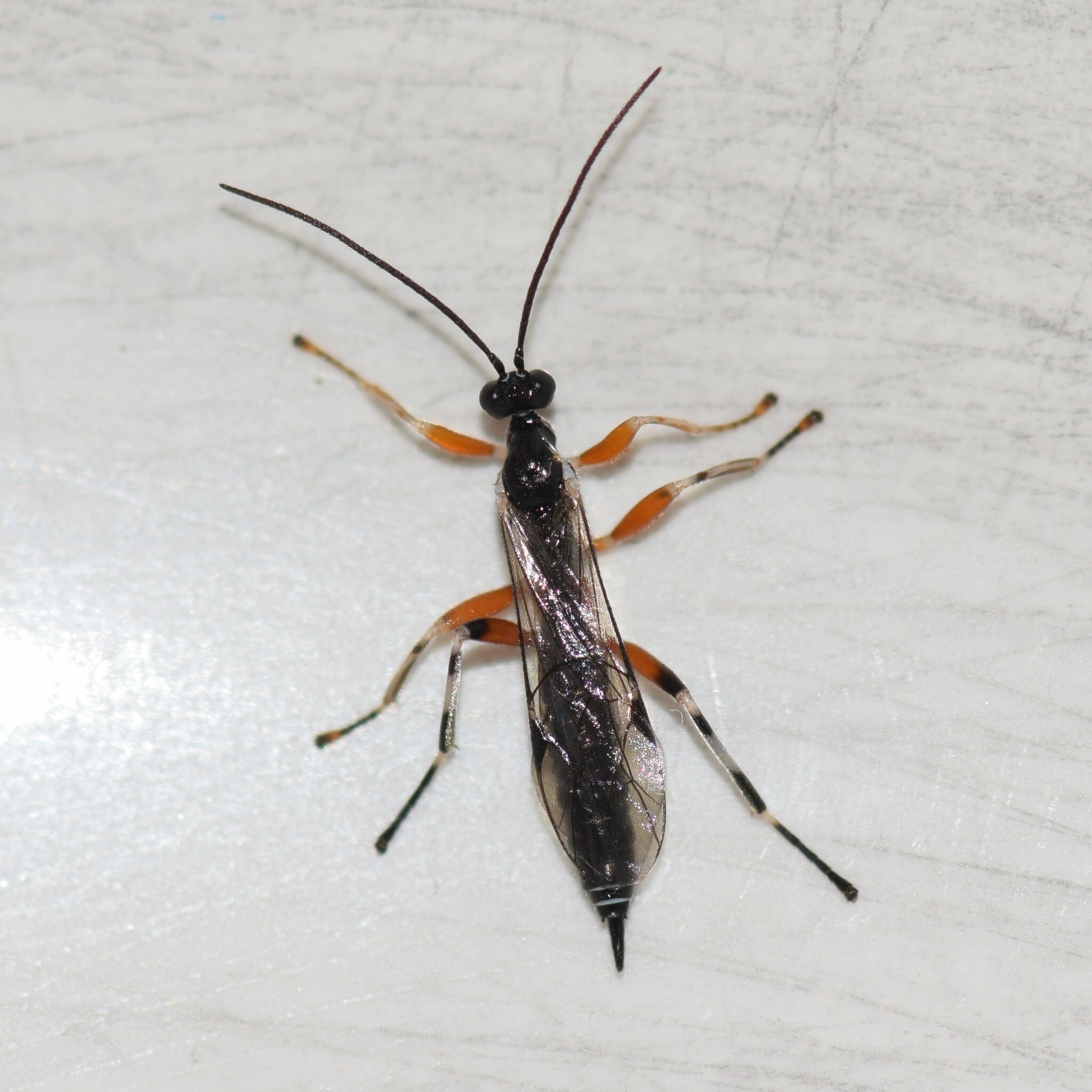
- Oxyrrhexis carbonator texana

Scientific classification
- Domain: Eukaryota
- Kingdom: Animalia
- Phylum: Arthropoda
- Class: Insecta
- Order: Hymenoptera
- Family: Ichneumonidae
- Tribe: Ephialtini
- Genus: Oxyrrhexis; Förster, 1869

= Oxyrrhexis =

Genus of wasps

Oxyrrhexis is a genus of ichneumon wasps in the family Ichneumonidae. There are at least four described species in Oxyrrhexis.

== Species ==
These four species belong to the genus Oxyrrhexis:

- Oxyrrhexis carbonator (Gravenhorst, 1807)
- Oxyrrhexis chinensis He, 1996
- Oxyrrhexis eurus Kasparyan, 1977
- Oxyrrhexis zephyrus Fritzén & Fjellberg, 2014
