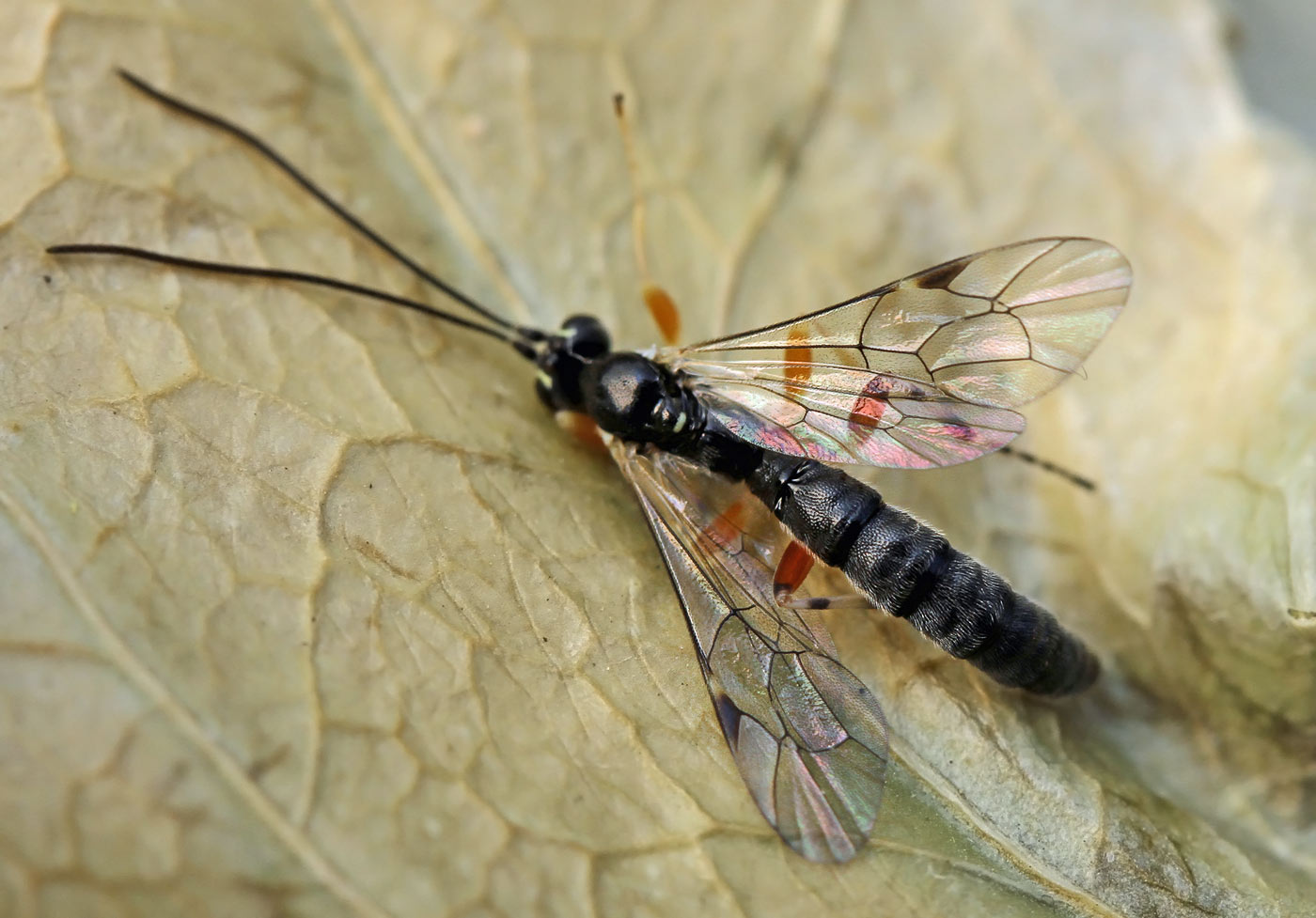
- Tromatobia ovivora

Scientific classification
- Kingdom: Animalia
- Phylum: Arthropoda
- Class: Insecta
- Order: Hymenoptera
- Family: Ichneumonidae
- Tribe: Ephialtini
- Genus: Tromatobia; Förster, 1869

= Tromatobia =

Genus of wasps

Tromatobia is a genus of parasitoid wasps in the family Ichneumonidae. There are 33 described species in Tromatobia. Species in this genus are parasites of egg sacs of spiders from the families Araneidae, Clubionidae, Philodromidae and Theridiidae.

== Select species ==
- Tromatobia flavistellata Uchida & Momoi, 1957
- Tromatobia lineatoria (Villers, 1789)
- Tromatobia nipponica Uchida, 1928
- Tromatobia notator (Fabricius, 1804)
- Tromatobia ovivora (Boheman, 1821)
- Tromatobia rufopectus (Cresson, 1870)
- Tromatobia variabilis (Holmgren, 1856)
- Tromatobia zonata (Davis, 1895)

== Gallery ==
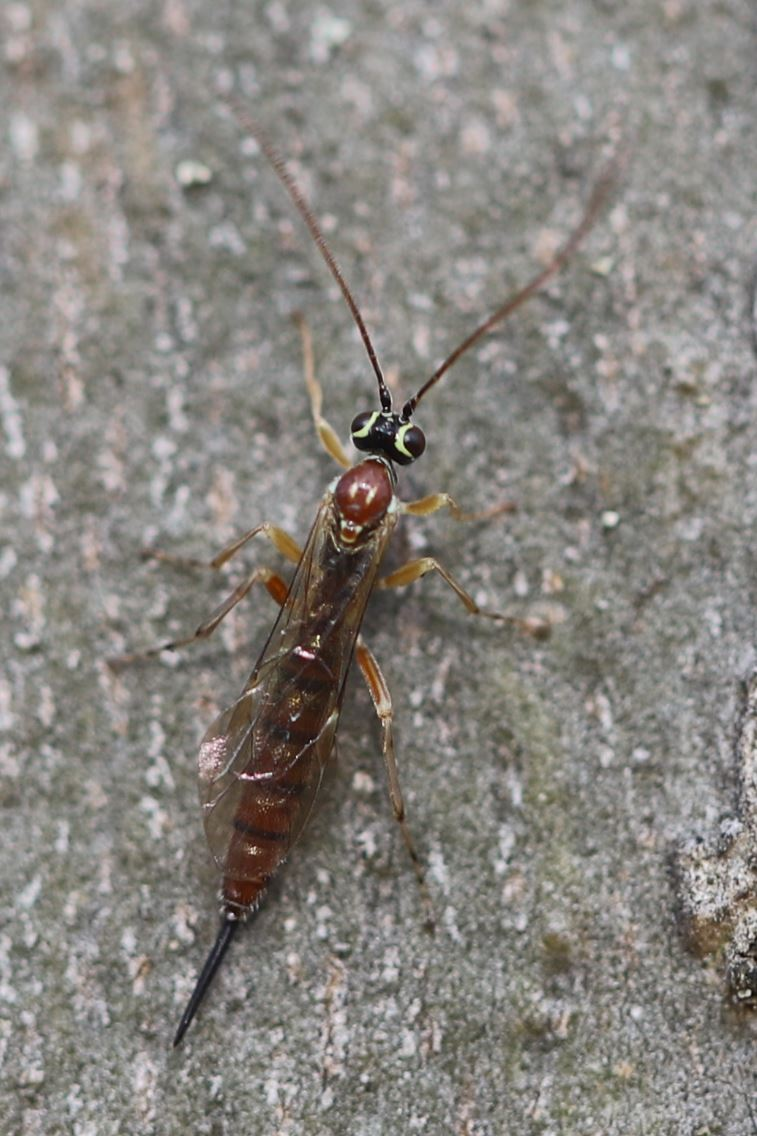
Tromatobia lineatoria

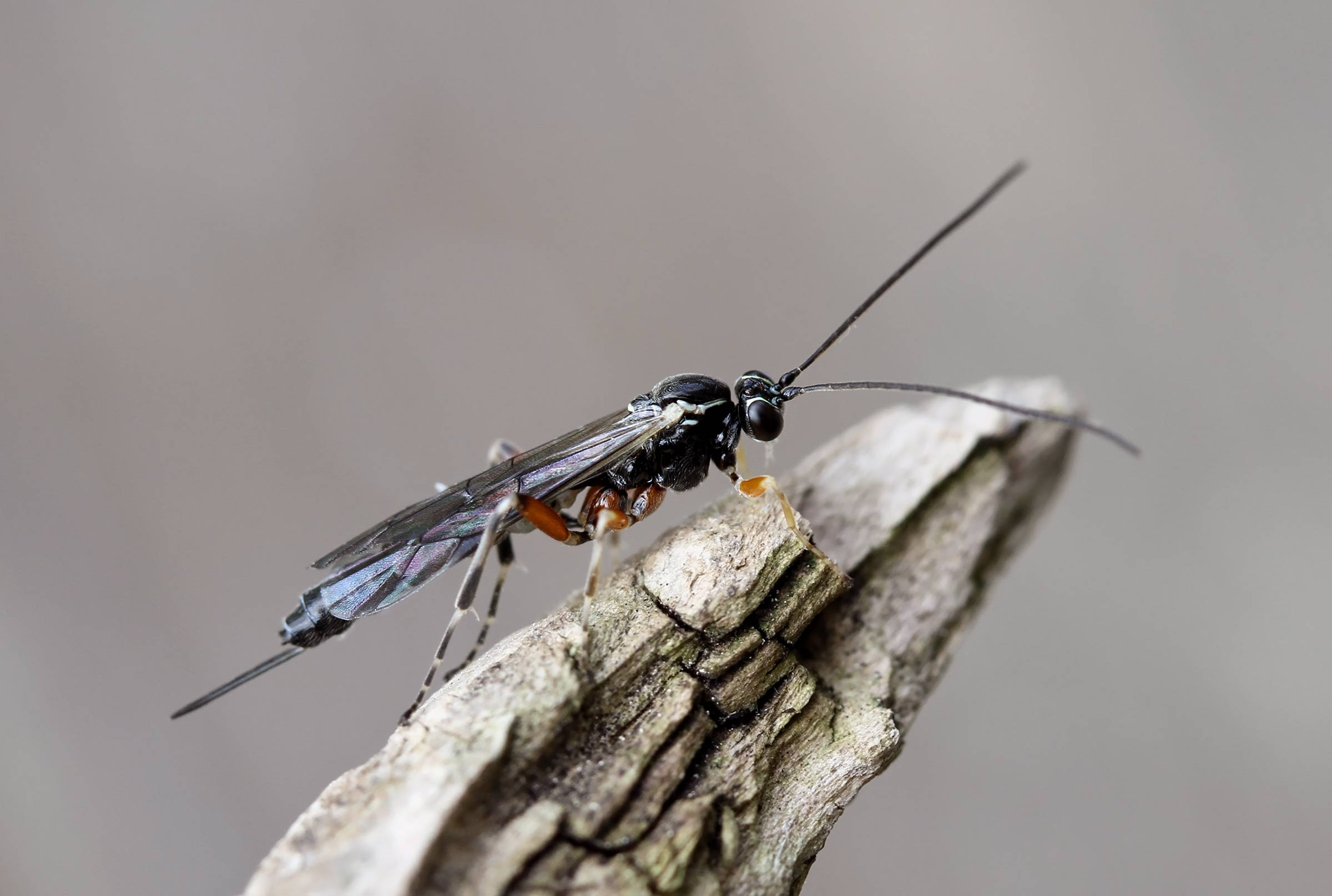
Tromatobia ovivora

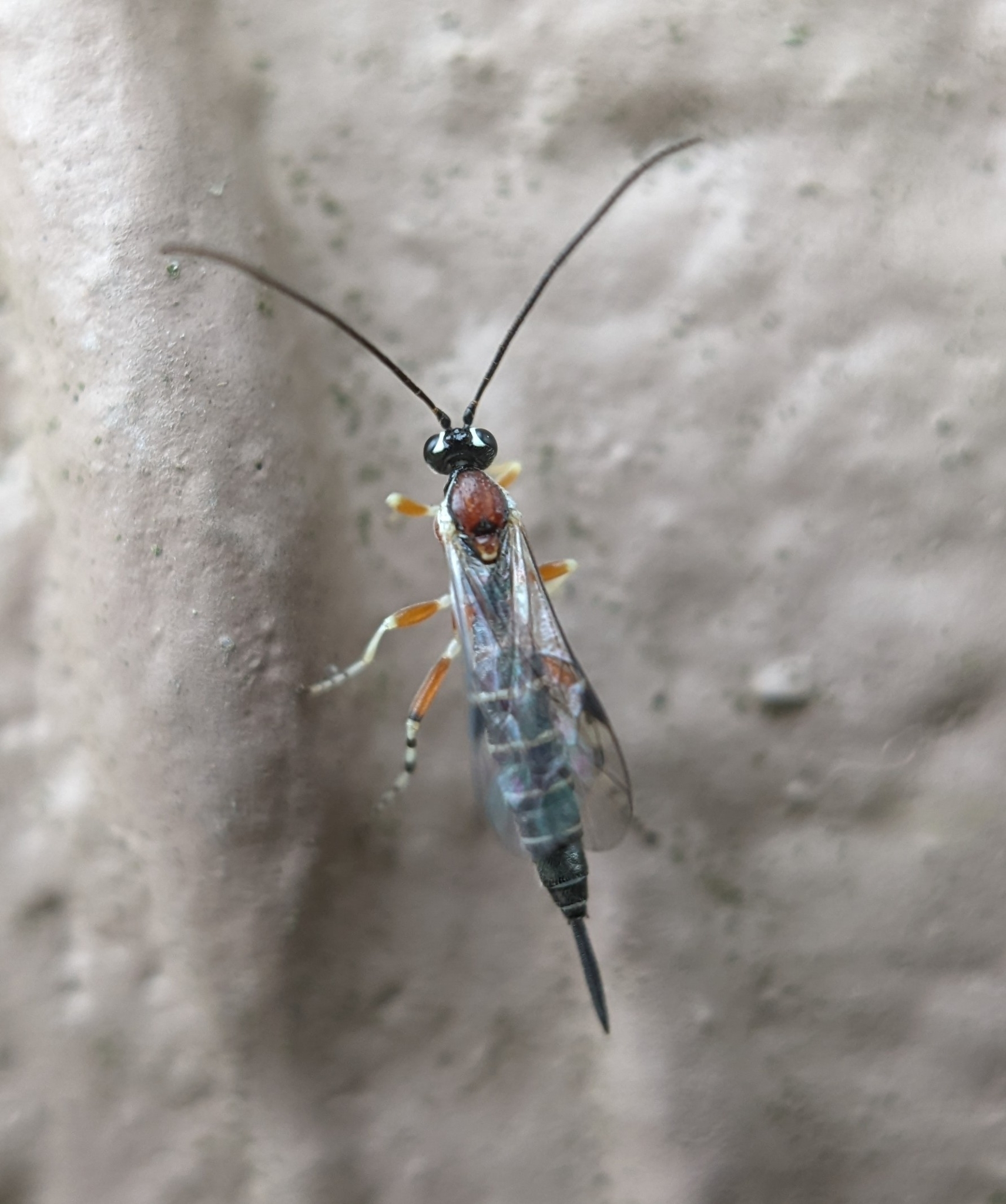
Tromatobia zonata
