= Zaglyptus =

Scientific classification
- Domain: Eukaryota
- Kingdom: Animalia
- Phylum: Arthropoda
- Class: Insecta
- Order: Hymenoptera
- Family: Ichneumonidae
- Tribe: Ephialtini
- Genus: Zaglyptus; Förster, 1869

Genus of wasps

Zaglyptus is a genus of ichneumon wasps in the family Ichneumonidae. There are at least 20 described species in Zaglyptus.

== Species ==
These 23 species belong to the genus Zaglyptus:

- Zaglyptus ankaratrus Seyrig, 1934^{c g}
- Zaglyptus arizonicus Townes, 1960^{c g}
- Zaglyptus chavesi Gauld, 1991^{c g}
- Zaglyptus cortesi Porter, 1979^{c g}
- Zaglyptus divaricatus Baltazar, 1961^{c g}
- Zaglyptus facifidus Baltazar, 1961^{c g}
- Zaglyptus formosus Cushman, 1933^{c g}
- Zaglyptus glaber Gupta, 1961^{c g}
- Zaglyptus glabrinotus (Girault, 1925)^{c g}
- Zaglyptus grandis Gupta, 1961^{c g}
- Zaglyptus hollowayi Gauld, 1984^{c g}
- Zaglyptus indicus Gupta, 1961^{c g}
- Zaglyptus iwatai (Uchida, 1936)^{c g}
- Zaglyptus miarus Gupta, 1961^{c g}
- Zaglyptus multicolor (Gravenhorst, 1829)^{c g}
- Zaglyptus nigrolineatus Gupta, 1961^{c g}
- Zaglyptus pictilis Townes, 1960^{c g b}
- Zaglyptus romeroae Gauld, 1991^{c g}
- Zaglyptus rufus Hellen, 1949^{c g}
- Zaglyptus semirufus Momoi, 1970^{c g}
- Zaglyptus trituberculatus (Benoit, 1953)^{c g}
- Zaglyptus varipes (Gravenhorst, 1829)^{c g b}
- Zaglyptus wuyiensis He, 1984^{c g}

Data sources: i = ITIS, c = Catalogue of Life, g = GBIF, b = Bugguide.net
