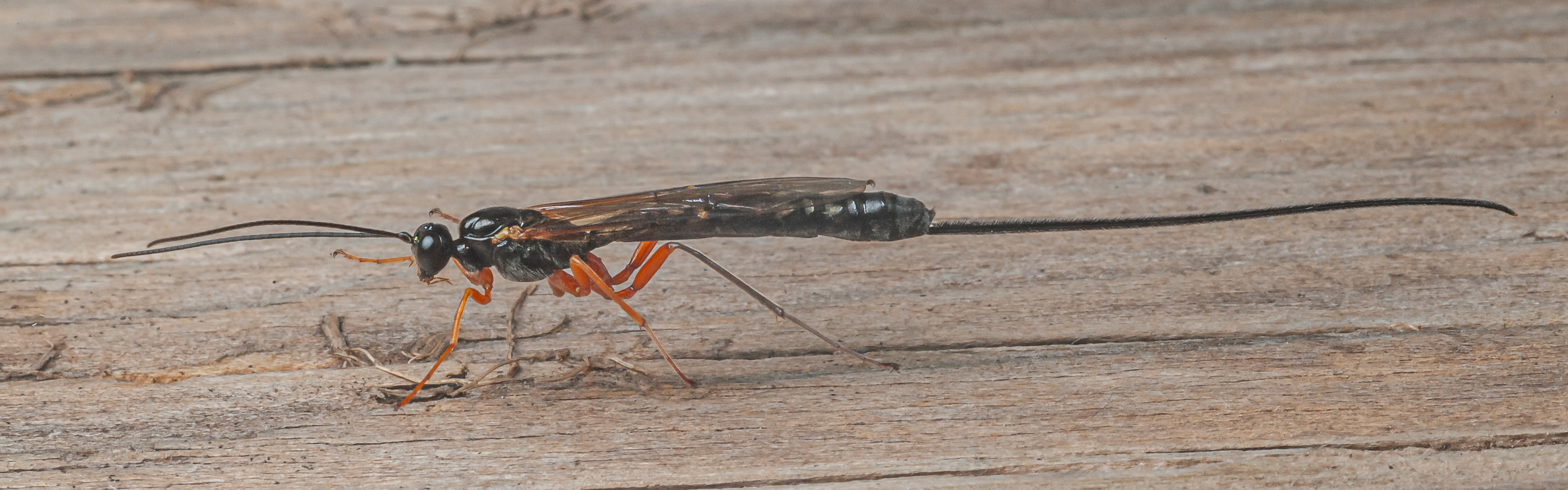
- Dolichomitus sp.

Scientific classification
- Kingdom: Animalia
- Phylum: Arthropoda
- Class: Insecta
- Order: Hymenoptera
- Family: Ichneumonidae
- Tribe: Ephialtini
- Genus: Dolichomitus; Smith, 1877

= Dolichomitus =

Genus of wasps

Dolichomitus is a genus of ichneumon wasps in the family Ichneumonidae. There are at least 70 described species in Dolichomitus. The name is derived from the Greek dolicho, meaning long or narrow, and the Greek mitus, meaning a thread.

== Species ==
These 85 species belong to the genus Dolichomitus:

- Dolichomitus aciculatus (Hellen, 1915)^{c g}
- Dolichomitus agnoscendus (Roman, 1939)^{c g}
- Dolichomitus annulicornis (Cameron, 1886)^{c g}
- Dolichomitus atratus (Rudow, 1881)^{c}
- Dolichomitus baiamarensis (Constantineanu & Pisica, 1970)^{c g}
- Dolichomitus billorum Gauld, 1991^{c g}
- Dolichomitus birnovensis (Constantineanu & Pisica, 1970)^{c g}
- Dolichomitus bivittatus Townes, 1975^{c g}
- Dolichomitus buccatus Townes, 1960^{c g}
- Dolichomitus californicus Townes, 1960^{c g}
- Dolichomitus cangrejae Gauld, Ugalde & Hanson, 1998^{c g}
- Dolichomitus cantillanoi Gauld, 1991^{c g}
- Dolichomitus cephalotes (Holmgren, 1860)^{c}
- Dolichomitus cognator (Thunberg, 1822)^{c g}
- Dolichomitus crassus (Morley, 1913)^{c}
- Dolichomitus curticornis (Perkins, 1943)^{c g}
- Dolichomitus cuspidatus Townes, 1960^{c g}
- Dolichomitus debilis Sheng, 2002^{c g}
- Dolichomitus diversicostae (Perkins, 1943)^{c g}
- Dolichomitus dobrogensis Constantineanu & Pisica, 1970^{c g}
- Dolichomitus dolichosoma (Viereck, 1912)^{c g}
- Dolichomitus dux (Tschek, 1869)^{c g}
- Dolichomitus elongatus (Uchida, 1928)^{c g}
- Dolichomitus excavatus Zwakhals, 2010^{g}
- Dolichomitus feralis (Tosquinet, 1903)^{c g}
- Dolichomitus flacissimus Gauld, Ugalde & Hanson, 1998^{c g}
- Dolichomitus flexilis Townes, 1960^{c g}
- Dolichomitus fortis Sheng, 2002^{c g}
- Dolichomitus foxleei Townes, 1960^{c g}
- Dolichomitus garudai Gupta & Tikar, 1976^{c g}
- Dolichomitus grilloi Gauld, 1991^{c g}
- Dolichomitus hypermeces Townes, 1975^{c g}
- Dolichomitus imperator (Kriechbaumer, 1854)^{c g}
- Dolichomitus iridipennis (Morley, 1913)^{c g}
- Dolichomitus irritator (Fabricius, 1775)^{c g b}
- Dolichomitus jiyuanensis Lin, 2005^{c g}
- Dolichomitus khasianus Gupta & Tikar, 1976^{c g}
- Dolichomitus koreanus Lee & Choi^{g}
- Dolichomitus kriechbaumeri (Schulz, 1906)^{c g}
- Dolichomitus lami^{g}
- Dolichomitus lateralis (Wollaston, 1858)^{c g}
- Dolichomitus longicauda Smith, 1877^{c g}
- Dolichomitus malaisei Gupta & Tikar, 1976^{c g}
- Dolichomitus mandibularis (Uchida, 1932)^{c g}
- Dolichomitus mariajosae Araujo & Pádua, 2020
- Dolichomitus maruti Gupta & Tikar, 1976^{c g}
- Dolichomitus matsumurai (Uchida, 1926)^{c g}
- Dolichomitus megalourus (Morley, 1914)^{c g}
- Dolichomitus meii (Di Giovanni & Sääksjärvi, 2021)
- Dolichomitus melanomerus (Vollenhoven, 1878)^{c g}
- Dolichomitus menai Araujo & Pádua, 2020
- Dolichomitus mesocentrus (Gravenhorst, 1829)^{c g}
- Dolichomitus messor (Gravenhorst, 1829)^{c g}
- Dolichomitus moacyri Loffredo & Penteado-Dias, 2012^{g}
- Dolichomitus mordator (Aubert, 1965)^{c g}
- Dolichomitus mucronatus Constantineanu & Pisica, 1970^{c g}
- Dolichomitus nakamurai (Uchida, 1928)^{c g}
- Dolichomitus nigritarsis (Cameron, 1899)^{c g}
- Dolichomitus nitidus (Haupt, 1954)^{c g}
- Dolichomitus orejuelai Araujo & Pádua, 2020
- Dolichomitus pallitibia Baltazar, 1961^{c g}
- Dolichomitus pimmi Araujo & Pádua, 2020
- Dolichomitus populneus (Ratzeburg, 1848)^{c g}
- Dolichomitus pterelas (Say, 1829)^{c g b}
- Dolichomitus pygmaeus (Walsh, 1873)^{c g b}
- Dolichomitus quercicolus Zwakhals, 2010^{g}
- Dolichomitus rendoni Araujo & Pádua, 2020
- Dolichomitus romanicus Constantineanu & Pisica, 1970^{c g}
- Dolichomitus rufescens (Cresson, 1865)^{c g}
- Dolichomitus rufinus Lee & Choi^{g}
- Dolichomitus saperdus Wang, 2000^{c g}
- Dolichomitus scutellaris (Thomson, 1877)^{c g}
- Dolichomitus sericeus (Hartig, 1847)^{c g}
- Dolichomitus shenefelti Baltazar, 1961^{c g}
- Dolichomitus sirenkoi Varga, 2012^{g}
- Dolichomitus songxianicus Sheng, 2004^{c g}
- Dolichomitus speciosus (Hellen, 1915)^{c g}
- Dolichomitus splendidus Sheng, 2002^{c g}
- Dolichomitus taeniatus Townes, 1960^{c g}
- Dolichomitus terebrans (Ratzeburg, 1844)^{c g}
- Dolichomitus triangustus Wang, 1997^{c g}
- Dolichomitus tuberculatus (Geoffroy, 1785)^{c g}
- Dolichomitus vitticrus Townes, 1960^{c g}
- Dolichomitus xanthopodus Gupta & Tikar, 1976^{c g}
- Dolichomitus zonatus (Cresson, 1874)^{c g}

Data sources: i = ITIS, c = Catalogue of Life, g = GBIF, b = Bugguide.net
