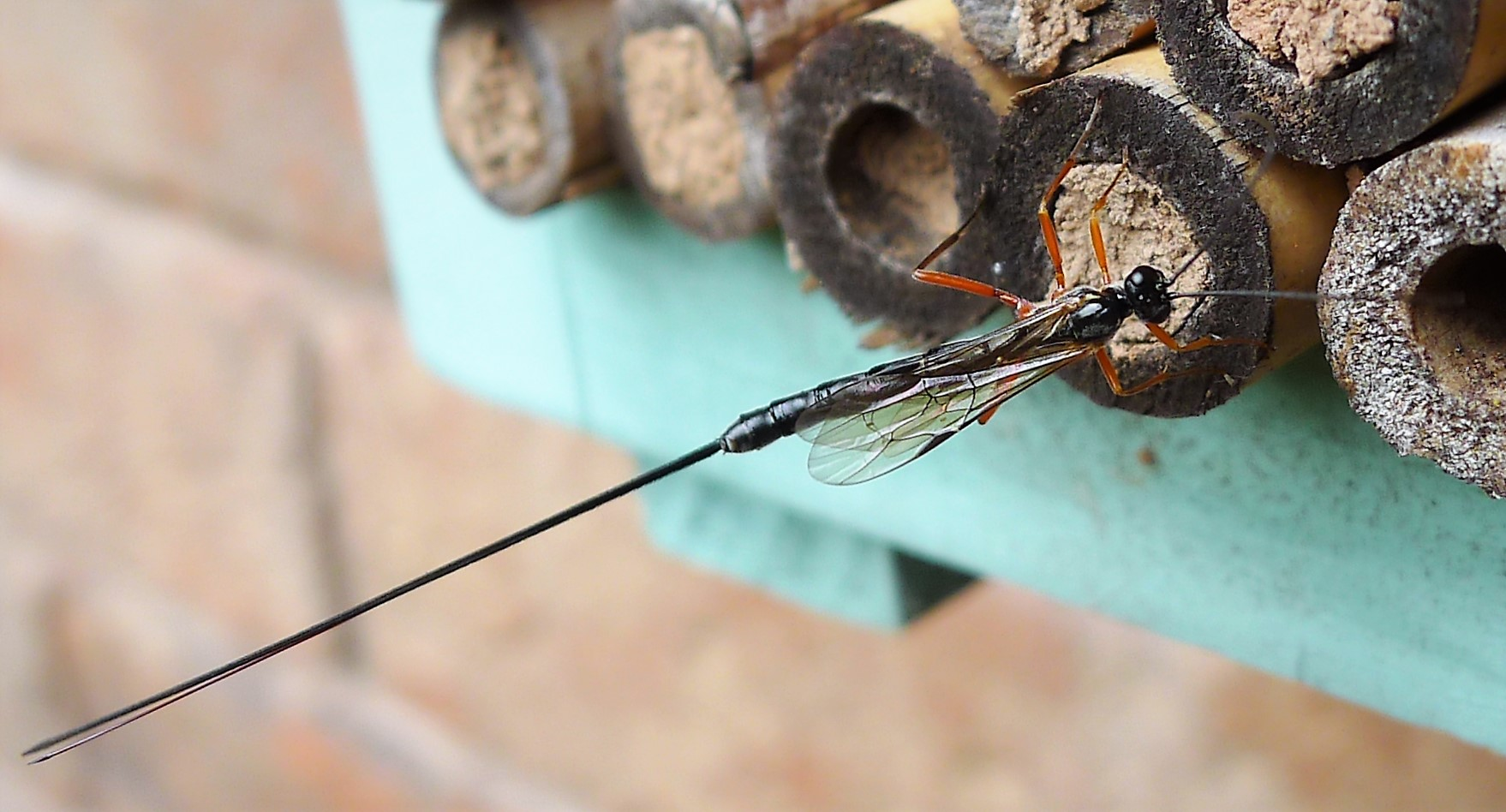
- Ephialtes manifestator

Scientific classification
- Kingdom: Animalia
- Phylum: Arthropoda
- Class: Insecta
- Order: Hymenoptera
- Family: Ichneumonidae
- Genus: Ephialtes; Gravenhorst, 1829

= Ephialtes (wasp) =

Genus of wasps

Ephialtes is a genus of ichneumon wasps in the family Ichneumonidae. There are about 14 described species in Ephialtes.

== Species ==
These 14 species belong to the genus Ephialtes:

- Ephialtes arisanus Sonan, 1936^{c g}
- Ephialtes brevis Morley, 1914^{c}
- Ephialtes brischkei Dalla Torre, 1901^{c g}
- Ephialtes decumbens (Townes, 1960)^{c g}
- Ephialtes duplicauda Heinrich, 1949^{c g}
- Ephialtes facialis Brischke, 1865^{c g}
- Ephialtes hokkaidonis Uchida, 1928^{c g}
- Ephialtes longicornis (Pfeffer, 1913)^{c g}
- Ephialtes macer Cresson, 1868^{c g}
- Ephialtes manifestator (Linnaeus, 1758)^{c g}
- Ephialtes sodomiticus Westwood, 1838^{c g}
- Ephialtes taiwanus (Uchida, 1928)^{g}
- Ephialtes tenchozanus Sonan, 1936^{c g}
- Ephialtes zirnitsi Ozols, 1962^{c g}

Data sources: i = ITIS, c = Catalogue of Life, g = GBIF, b = Bugguide.net
