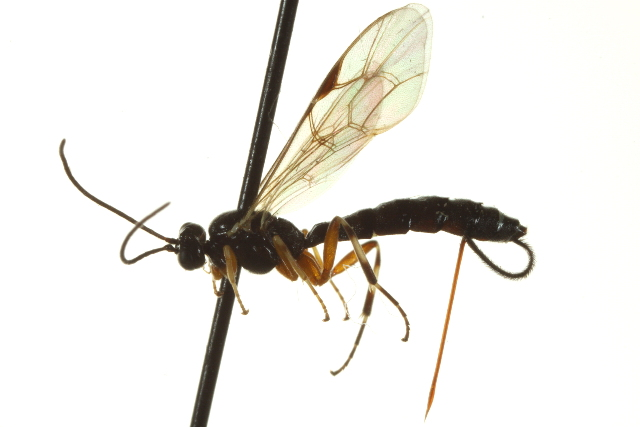
- Acropimpla pronexus

Scientific classification
- Kingdom: Animalia
- Phylum: Arthropoda
- Clade: Pancrustacea
- Class: Insecta
- Order: Hymenoptera
- Family: Ichneumonidae
- Tribe: Ephialtini
- Genus: Acropimpla; Townes, 1960

= Acropimpla =

Genus of wasps

Acropimpla is a genus of ichneumon wasps in the family Ichneumonidae.

== Species ==
There are at least 41 described species of Acropimpla:

- Acropimpla alboricta (Cresson, 1870)^{c g b}
- Acropimpla alboscutellaris (Szépligeti, 1908)^{c}
- Acropimpla arjuna Gupta & Tikar, 1976^{c g}
- Acropimpla aspera Gupta & Tikar, 1976^{c g}
- Acropimpla benguetica Baltazar, 1961^{c g}
- Acropimpla bicarinata (Cameron, 1899)^{c g}
- Acropimpla bifida Gupta & Tikar, 1976^{c g}
- Acropimpla buddha Gupta & Tikar, 1976^{c g}
- Acropimpla calva Baltazar, 1961^{c g}
- Acropimpla davaonica Baltazar, 1961^{c g}
- Acropimpla devia Baltazar, 1961^{c g}
- Acropimpla didyma (Gravenhorst, 1829)^{c g}
- Acropimpla emmiltosa Kusigemati, 1985^{c g}
- Acropimpla faciata Gupta & Tikar, 1976^{c g}
- Acropimpla facinotata Baltazar, 1961^{c g}
- Acropimpla flavoscutis (Cameron, 1907)^{c g}
- Acropimpla hapaliae (Rao, 1953)^{c}
- Acropimpla laevituberculata Liu, He & Chen^{g}
- Acropimpla lampei^{g}
- Acropimpla leucostoma (Cameron, 1907)^{c g}
- Acropimpla lucifugus (Seyrig, 1932)^{c g}
- Acropimpla maculifacia Gupta & Tikar, 1976^{c g}
- Acropimpla medioflava Baltazar, 1961^{c g}
- Acropimpla melanoplax Baltazar, 1961^{c g}
- Acropimpla mucronis^{g}
- Acropimpla nakula Gupta & Tikar, 1976^{c g}
- Acropimpla nigrescens (Cushman, 1933)^{c g}
- Acropimpla nigroscutis (Cameron, 1907)^{c g}
- Acropimpla persimilis (Ashmead, 1906)^{c g}
- Acropimpla phongdienensis^{g}
- Acropimpla pictipes (Gravenhorst, 1829)^{c g}
- Acropimpla poorva Gupta & Tikar, 1976^{c g}
- Acropimpla pronexus Townes, 1960^{c g}
- Acropimpla punctata Baltazar, 1961^{c g}
- Acropimpla spicula Gupta & Tikar, 1976^{c g}
- Acropimpla taishunensis Liu, He & Chen^{g}
- Acropimpla tricolor Kusigemati, 1985^{c g}
- Acropimpla uchidai (Cushman, 1933)^{c g}
- Acropimpla uttara Gupta & Tikar, 1976^{c g}
- Acropimpla varuna Gupta & Tikar, 1976^{c g}
- Acropimpla xantha Gauld, 1984^{c g}

Data sources: c = Catalogue of Life, g = GBIF, b = Bugguide.net
