= Diptera of Patagonia and South Chile =

Series of books about flies

Diptera of Patagonia and South Chile is a series of books produced by the British Museum (Natural History) (now called the Natural History Museum). The books detail the Diptera collected primarily by the museum's expeditions to Patagonia in 1926, sometimes with notes of some later collections and material held in other collections.

== Full list of volumes ==
=== Vol : 1 - Crane flies ===
Title	Vol	Date	Auth	Pages
Crane flies	Fasc 1	1929	Alexander, C.P.	1-240

=== Vol : 2 - Other Nematocera ===
Title	Vol	Date	Auth	Pages
Psychodidae	Fasc 1	1929	Tonnoir, A.L.	1-32
Blepharoceridae	Fasc 2	1929	Edwards, F.W.	33-75
Bibionidae, Scatopsidae, Cecidomyiidae, Culicidae, Thaumaleidae (Orphnephilidae), Anisopodidae (Rhyphidae)	Fasc 3	1930	Edwards, F.W.	77-119
Simuliidae, Ceratopogonidae	Fasc 4	1931	Edwards, F.W.; Ingram, A.; Macfie, J.	121-232
Chironomidae	Fasc 5	1931	Edwards, F.W.	233-331

=== Vol : 3 - Mycetophilidae ===
Title	Vol	Date	Auth	Pages
Mycetophilidae	Fasc 1	1951	Freeman, P.	1-138

=== Vol : 4 - Empididae ===
Title	Vol	Date	Auth	Pages
Empididae	Fasc 1	1933	Collin, J E	1-334

=== Vol : 5 - Larger Brachycera ===
Title	Vol	Date	Auth	Pages
Dolichopodidae	Fasc 1	1930	Van Duzee, M.C.	1-92
Stratiomyidae, Tabanidae, Bombyliidae, Nemestrinidae, Cyrtidae	Fasc 2	1930	Aubertin, D.; Krober, O.; Edwards, F.W.	93-197
Rhagionidae, Therevidae, Lonchopteridae; Scenopinidae, Mydaidae, Asilidae	Fasc 3	1932	Malloch, J.R.; Edwards, F.W.; Bromley, S.W.	199-293

=== Vol : 6 - Aschiza ===
Title	Vol	Date	Auth	Pages
Sciadoceridae and Phoridae	Fasc 1	1929	Schmitz, H.	1-42
Phoridae, Platypezidae, Pipunculidae, Sphaeroceridae (Borboridae), Ephydridae	Fasc 2	1931	Schmitz, H.; Collin, J.E.; Richards, O.W.; Cresson, E.	43-116
Ephydridae (Supplement), Syrphidae, Conopidae	Fasc 3	1933	Edwards, F.W.; Shannon, R.C.; Aubertin, D.; Malloch, J.R.	117-175
Acalyptrata; Heleomyzidae, Trypetidae, Sciomyzidae, Sapromyzidae	Fasc 4	1933	Malloch, J.R.	177-389
Acalyptrata (concluded)	Fasc 5	1934	Malloch, J.R.	393-489
Acalyptrata (Key to Families)	Fasc 6	1948	Malloch, J.R.	491-507

=== Vol : 7 - Calyptrates ===
Title	Vol	Date	Auth	Pages
Tachinidae	Fasc 1	1934	Aldrich, J.M	1-170
Muscidae	Fasc 2	1934	Malloch, J.R.	171-346
Calliphoridae (Sarcophaginae, Calliphorinae)	Fasc 3	1937	Hall, D.G.; Smart, J.	347-389
