= Callomyia corvina =

Scientific classification
- Domain: Eukaryota
- Kingdom: Animalia
- Phylum: Arthropoda
- Class: Insecta
- Order: Diptera
- Family: Platypezidae
- Genus: Callomyia
- Species: C. corvina

Binomial name
- Callomyia corvina Kessel, 1949

Species of fly

Callomyia corvina is a species of flat-footed flies (insects in the family Platypezidae).
