= Flatfoot (disambiguation) =

Flatfoot or flat foot may refer to:

- Flat feet (also called pes planus or fallen arches), a medical condition
- A pejorative slang term for a police officer

== Theater and film ==
- Flatfoot (play), a 2003 comedy
- Flat Foot Stooges, a 1938 Three Stooges short film
- Inspector "Flatfoot" Rizzo, protagonist of a series of films: Flatfoot, Flatfoot in Hong Kong, Flatfoot in Africa, and Flatfoot in Egypt

== Music ==
- Flat Foot Floogie (with a Floy Floy), a 1938 song
- Flatfoot 56, an American punk band
- The Flat Foot Four, a barbershop quartet extant in 1940

== Dance ==
- Clogging, also called flatfoot dance

== Zoology ==
- Platypus, whose name (literally "flat foot[ed]") is Latin derived from the Greek words "platys" (flat, broad) and "pous" (foot)
- Platypezoidea and Opetiidae, both of which are also called flat-footed flies

== Other ==
- Flat foot bicycle, another name for the crank forward type of bicycle
- Flat foot climbing technique, a version of the French technique used in climbing snow slopes
