= Seri dymka =

Scientific classification
- Domain: Eukaryota
- Kingdom: Animalia
- Phylum: Arthropoda
- Class: Insecta
- Order: Diptera
- Family: Platypezidae
- Genus: Seri
- Species: S. dymka

Binomial name
- Seri dymka (Kessel, 1961)

Synonyms
- Clythia dymka Kessel, 1961

Species of fly

Seri dymka is a species of fly in the genus Seri.
