= Grossoseta pacifica =

Scientific classification
- Domain: Eukaryota
- Kingdom: Animalia
- Phylum: Arthropoda
- Class: Insecta
- Order: Diptera
- Family: Platypezidae
- Genus: Grossoseta
- Species: G. pacifica

Binomial name
- Grossoseta pacifica (Kessel, 1948)

Synonyms
- Platypezina pacifica Kessel, 1948

Species of fly

Grossoseta pacifica is a species of flat-footed flies (insects in the family Platypezidae).
