= Grossoseta =

Scientific classification
- Kingdom: Animalia
- Phylum: Arthropoda
- Class: Insecta
- Order: Diptera
- Family: Platypezidae
- Subfamily: Callomyiinae
- Genus: Grossoseta; Kessel & Kirby, 1968

Type species
- Platypezina pacifica Kessel, 1948

Genus of flies

Grossoseta is a genus of flat-footed flies (insects in the family Platypezidae). There are at least two described species in Grossoseta.

== Species ==
These two species belong to the genus Grossoseta:

- Grossoseta johnsoni (Kessel, 1961)
- Grossoseta pacifica (Kessel, 1948)

Data sources: i = ITIS, c = Catalogue of Life, g = GBIF, b = Bugguide.net
