= Grossoseta johnsoni =

Scientific classification
- Domain: Eukaryota
- Kingdom: Animalia
- Phylum: Arthropoda
- Class: Insecta
- Order: Diptera
- Family: Platypezidae
- Genus: Grossoseta
- Species: G. johnsoni

Binomial name
- Grossoseta johnsoni (Kessel, 1961)

Synonyms
- Platypezina johnsoni Kessel, 1961

Species of fly

Grossoseta johnsoni is a species of flat-footed flies (insects in the family Platypezidae).
