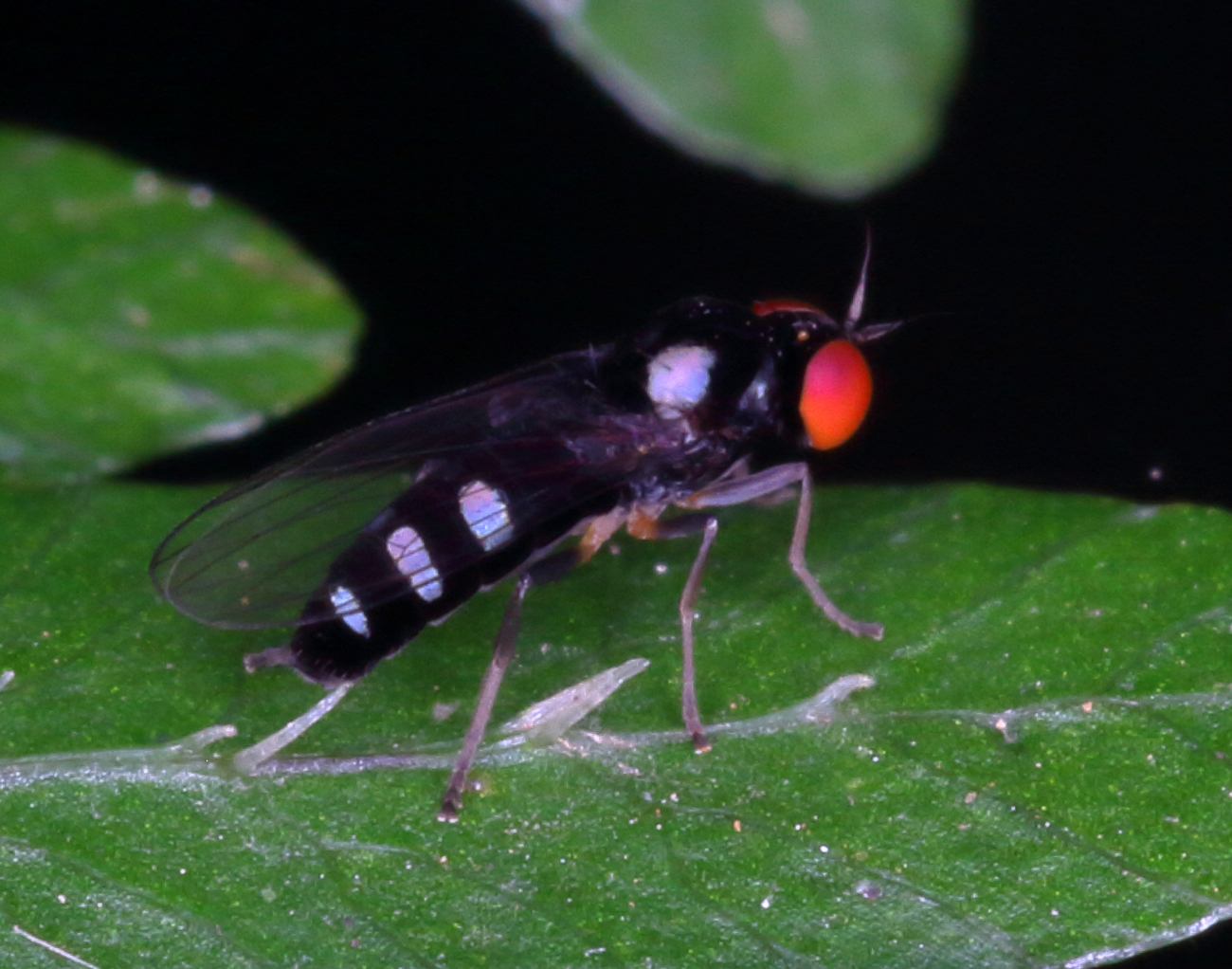
- Bertamyia umacibise

Scientific classification
- Domain: Eukaryota
- Kingdom: Animalia
- Phylum: Arthropoda
- Class: Insecta
- Order: Diptera
- Family: Platypezidae
- Subfamily: Callomyiinae
- Genus: Bertamyia; Kessel, 1970

Species
- Bertamyia notata; Bertamyia umacibise

= Bertamyia =

Genus of flies

Bertamyia is a genus of flat-footed flies (insects in the family Platypezidae). There are two described species Bertamyia notata and Bertamyia umacibise.

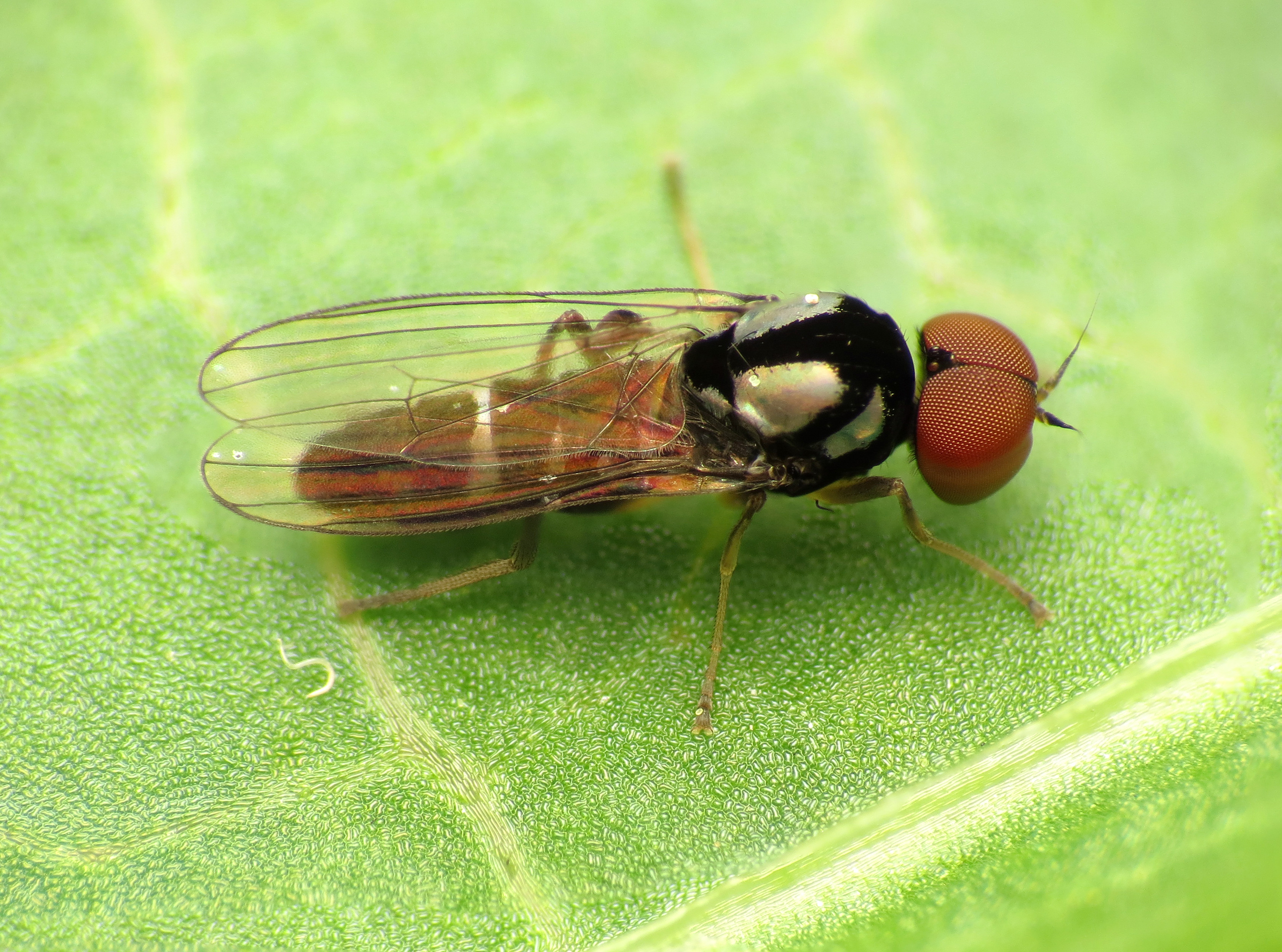
Bertamyia notata

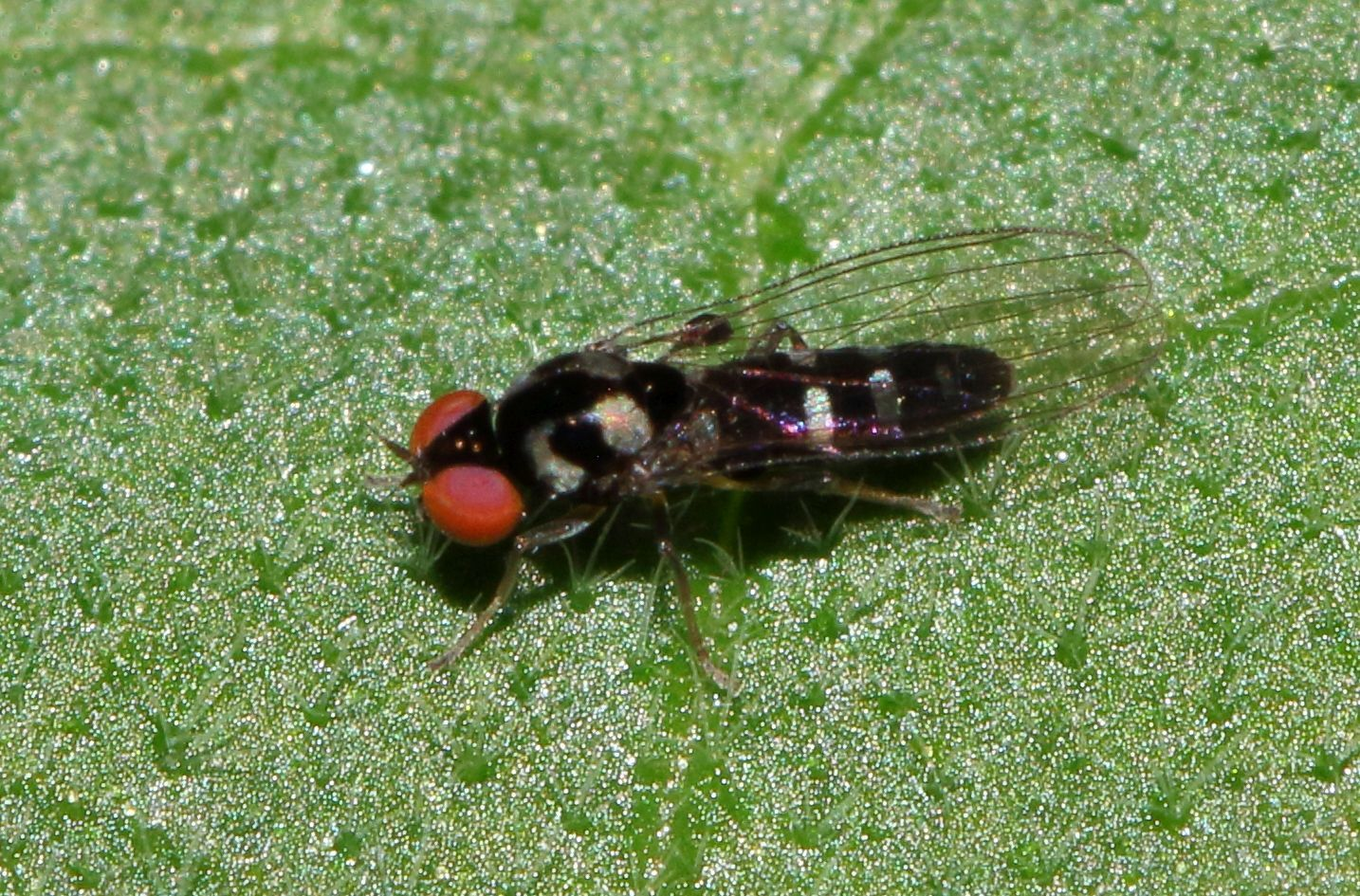
Bertamyia umacibise
