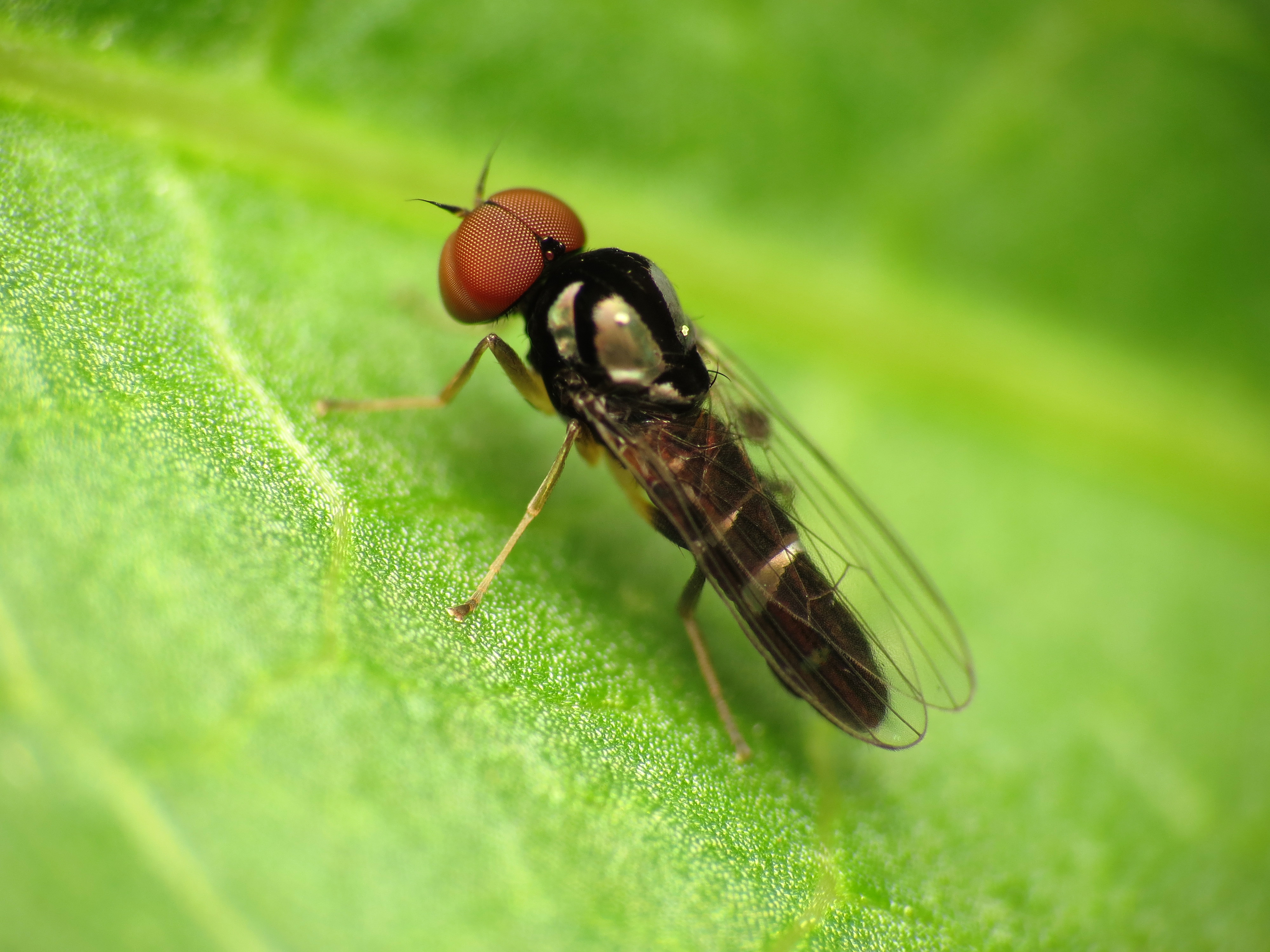
- Bertamyia notata

Scientific classification
- Domain: Eukaryota
- Kingdom: Animalia
- Phylum: Arthropoda
- Class: Insecta
- Order: Diptera
- Family: Platypezidae
- Genus: Bertamyia; Kessel, 1970
- Species: B. notata

Binomial name
- Bertamyia notata (Loew, 1869)

Synonyms
- Agathomyia australis Shannon, 1927; Agathomyia caeruleoguttata Oldenberg, 1917; Agathomyia coerulescens Oldenberg, 1913; Callomyia aldrichii Snow, 1894; Callomyia tenera Loew, 1870; Callomyia notata Loew, 1869

= Bertamyia notata =

Genus of flies

Bertamyia notata is a species of flat-footed flies (insects in the family Platypezidae) found in the Americas (Canada to Argentina).

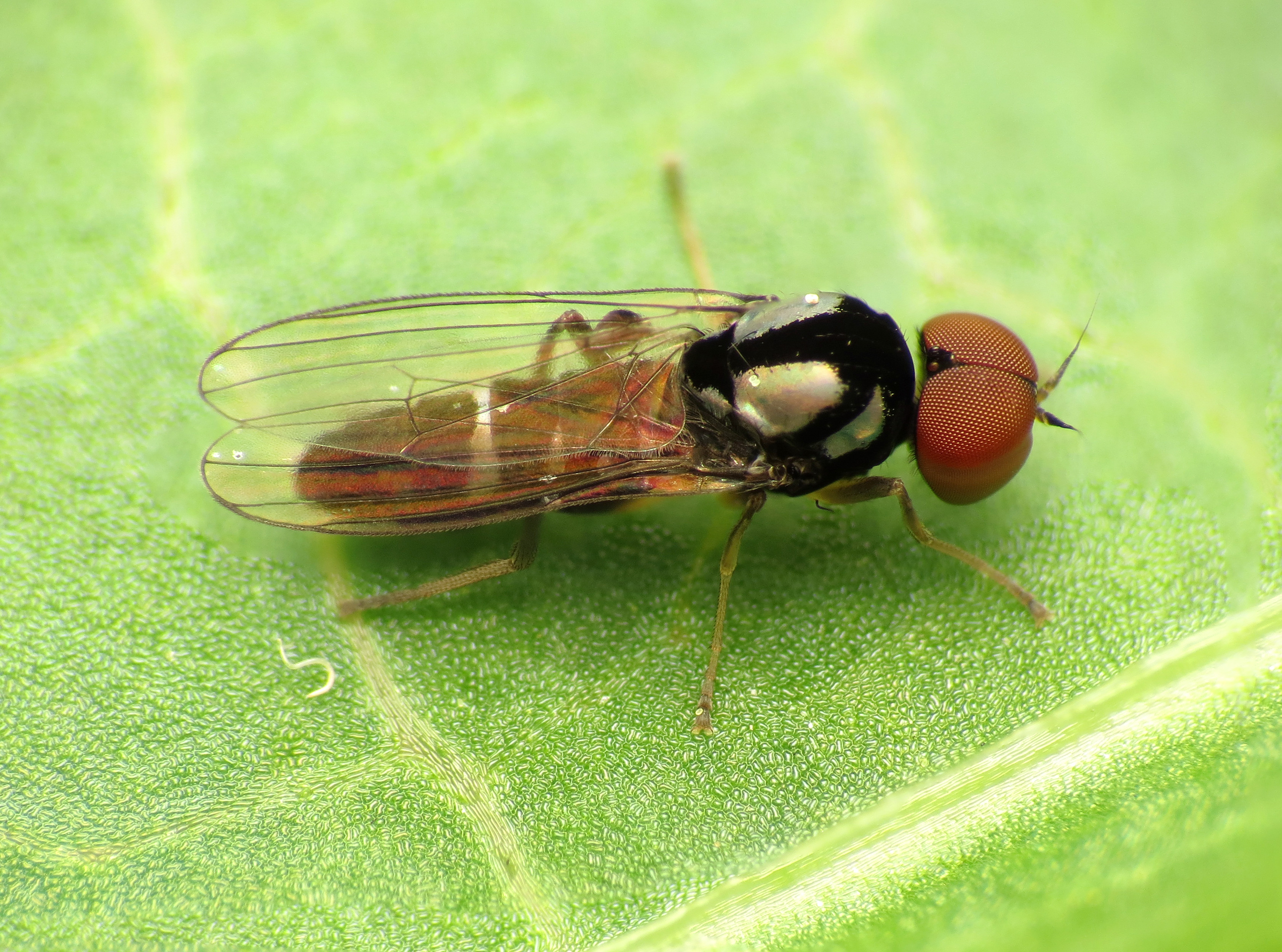
Bertamyia notata
