= Protoclythia californica =

Scientific classification
- Domain: Eukaryota
- Kingdom: Animalia
- Phylum: Arthropoda
- Class: Insecta
- Order: Diptera
- Family: Platypezidae
- Genus: Protoclythia
- Species: P. californica

Binomial name
- Protoclythia californica Kessel, 1950

Species of fly

Protoclythia californica is a species of flat-footed flies in the family Platypezidae.
