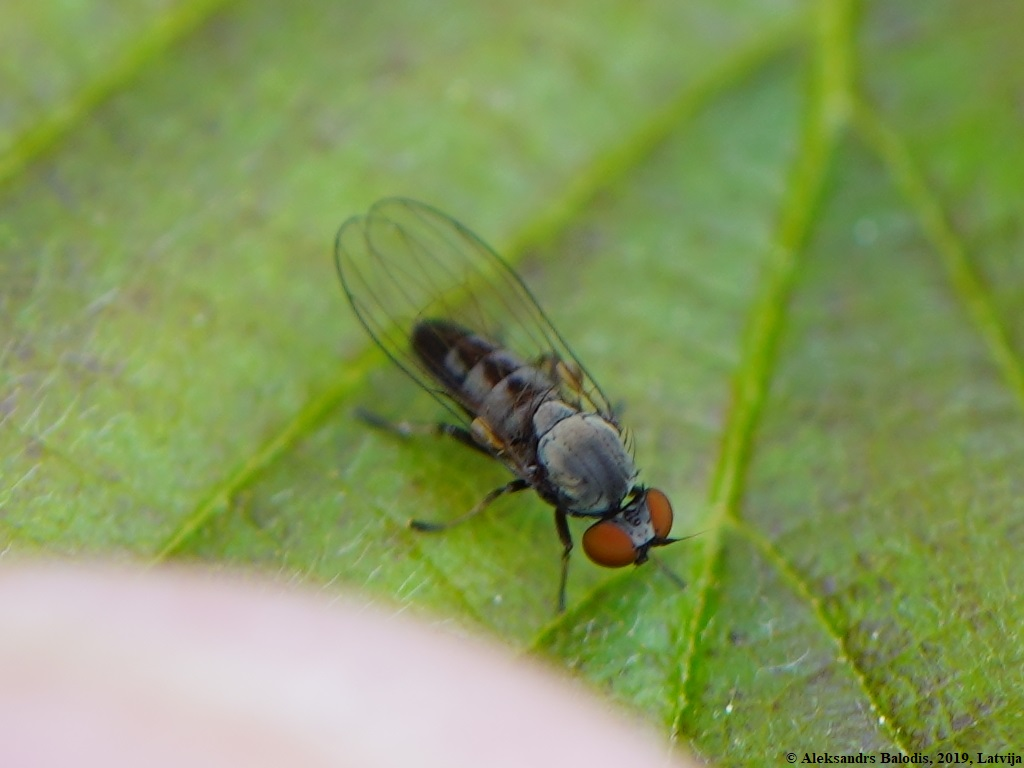
- Agathomyia antennata

Scientific classification
- Domain: Eukaryota
- Kingdom: Animalia
- Phylum: Arthropoda
- Class: Insecta
- Order: Diptera
- Family: Platypezidae
- Genus: Agathomyia
- Species: A. antennata

Binomial name
- Agathomyia antennata (Zetterstedt, 1819)

Synonyms
- Callomyza antennata Zetterstedt, 1819; Agathomyia hardyi Kessel & Clopton, 1969; Callomyia hoffmannseggii Meigen, 1824

= Agathomyia antennata =

Species of fly

Agathomyia antennata is a species of flat-footed fly in the family Platypezidae.
