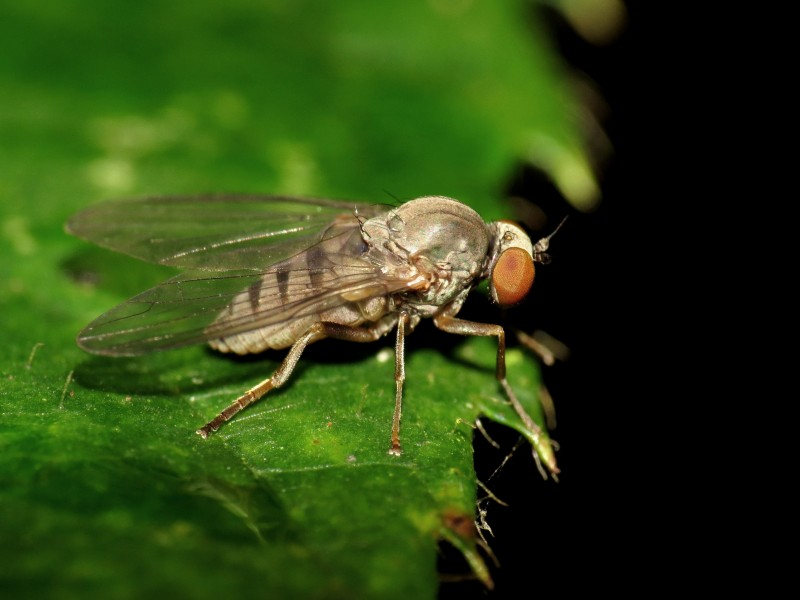
- Protoclythia modesta

Scientific classification
- Domain: Eukaryota
- Kingdom: Animalia
- Phylum: Arthropoda
- Class: Insecta
- Order: Diptera
- Family: Platypezidae
- Subfamily: Platypezinae
- Genus: Protoclythia; Kessel, 1950

Type species
- Protoclythia californica Kessel, 1950

= Protoclythia =

Genus of flies

Protoclythia is a genus of flat-footed flies in the family Platypezidae.

== Species ==
- P. californica Kessel, 1950
- P. modesta (Zetterstedt, 1844)
- P. rufa (Meigen, 1830)
