= Calotarsa =

Scientific classification
- Domain: Eukaryota
- Kingdom: Animalia
- Phylum: Arthropoda
- Class: Insecta
- Order: Diptera
- Family: Platypezidae
- Subfamily: Platypezinae
- Genus: Calotarsa; Townsend, 1894

Genus of flies

Calotarsa is a genus of flat-footed flies (insects in the family Platypezidae). There are about six described species in Calotarsa.

== Species ==
These six species belong to the genus Calotarsa:

- Calotarsa calceata (Snow, 1894)^{i c g}
- Calotarsa durangoensis Kessel & Young, 1974^{c g}
- Calotarsa insignis Aldrich, 1906^{i c g b}
- Calotarsa mexicana Kessel & Young, 1974^{c g}
- Calotarsa pallipes (Loew, 1866)^{i c g b}
- Calotarsa simplex Kessel, 1974^{i c g}

Data sources: i = ITIS, c = Catalogue of Life, g = GBIF, b = Bugguide.net
