= Seri (fly) =

Scientific classification
- Domain: Eukaryota
- Kingdom: Animalia
- Phylum: Arthropoda
- Class: Insecta
- Order: Diptera
- Family: Platypezidae
- Subfamily: Platypezinae
- Genus: Seri; Kessel & Kessel, 1966

Type species
- Clythia dymka Kessel, 1961

Genus of flies

Seri is a genus of flat-footed flies in the family Platypezidae.

== Species ==
- Seri dymka (Kessel, 1961)
- Seri obscuripennis (Oldenberg, 1917)
