= Calotarsa pallipes =

Scientific classification
- Domain: Eukaryota
- Kingdom: Animalia
- Phylum: Arthropoda
- Class: Insecta
- Order: Diptera
- Family: Platypezidae
- Genus: Calotarsa
- Species: C. pallipes

Binomial name
- Calotarsa pallipes (Loew, 1866)

Synonyms
- Calotarsa ornatipes Townsend, 1894; Platypeza pallipes Loew, 1866

Species of fly

Calotarsa pallipes is a species of flat-footed flies (insects in the family Platypezidae).
