= Melanderomyia =

Scientific classification
- Domain: Eukaryota
- Kingdom: Animalia
- Phylum: Arthropoda
- Class: Insecta
- Order: Diptera
- Family: Platypezidae
- Genus: Melanderomyia; Kessel, 1960
- Species: M. kahli

Binomial name
- Melanderomyia kahli Kessel, 1960

Genus of flies

Melanderomyia is a genus of flat-footed flies (insects in the family Platypezidae). There is one described species, Melanderomyia kahli.
