= Lindneromyia =

Scientific classification
- Domain: Eukaryota
- Kingdom: Animalia
- Phylum: Arthropoda
- Class: Insecta
- Order: Diptera
- Family: Platypezidae
- Subfamily: Platypezinae
- Genus: Lindneromyia; Kessel, 1965

Type species
- Lindneromyia africana Kessel, 1965

Synonyms
- Plesioclythia Kessel & Maggioncalda, 1968; Symmetricella Kessel, 1966; Grossovena Kessel & Maggioncalda, 1968; Penesymmetria Kessel & Maggioncalda, 1968

Genus of flies

Lindneromyia is a genus of flat-footed flies (insects in the family Platypezidae). There are at least 70 described species in Lindneromyia.

== Species ==
These 75 species belong to the genus Lindneromyia:

- Lindneromyia abessinica (Oldenberg, 1913)
- Lindneromyia abscondita (Snow, 1895)^{c g}
- Lindneromyia acuminata (Tonnoir, 1925)^{c g}
- Lindneromyia africana Kessel, 1965^{c g}
- Lindneromyia agarici (Willard, 1914)^{c g b}
- Lindneromyia albomaculata Chandler, 1994^{c g}
- Lindneromyia angustifrons (Oldenberg, 1917)
- Lindneromyia aquila (Kessel & Clopton, 1970)^{c g}
- Lindneromyia argentifascia Chandler, 1994^{c g}
- Lindneromyia argyrogyna (Meijere, 1907)^{c g}
- Lindneromyia arnaudi (Kessel & Clopton, 1970)^{c g}
- Lindneromyia austraquila Chandler, 1994^{c g}
- Lindneromyia balteata (Kessel & Clopton, 1970)^{c g}
- Lindneromyia basilewskyi (Kessel & Clopton, 1970)^{c g}
- Lindneromyia boharti (Kessel & Clopton, 1969)^{c g}
- Lindneromyia brunettii (Kessel & Clopton, 1969)^{c g}
- Lindneromyia brunnescens (Collin, 1931)^{c g}
- Lindneromyia caccabata (Kessel & Clopton, 1970)^{c g}
- Lindneromyia carbonaria (Kessel, 1950)^{c g}
- Lindneromyia cascassi (Bowden, 1979)^{c g}
- Lindneromyia cirrhocera (Czerny, 1930)^{c g}
- Lindneromyia curta Chandler, 1994^{c g}
- Lindneromyia denticulata (Tonnoir, 1925)^{c g}
- Lindneromyia dianae (Kessel & Clopton, 1970)^{c g}
- Lindneromyia dorsalis (Meigen, 1804)^{c g}
- Lindneromyia fasciventris (Oldenburg, 1917)^{c g}
- Lindneromyia fergusoni (Tonnoir, 1925)^{c g}
- Lindneromyia flavicornis (Loew, 1866)^{c g b}
- Lindneromyia flavipalpis Chandler, 1994^{c g}
- Lindneromyia fonsecai Chandler, 1994^{c g}
- Lindneromyia fumapex (Kessel, 1965)^{c g}
- Lindneromyia ghesquierei (Collart, 1950)^{c}
- Lindneromyia glaucescens (Walker, 1859)^{c g}
- Lindneromyia gressitti Chandler, 1994^{c g}
- Lindneromyia griseola (Tonnoir, 1925)^{c g}
- Lindneromyia hendricksoni (Kessel & Clopton, 1970)^{c g}
- Lindneromyia hirtifacies (Oldenberg, 1917)
- Lindneromyia hungarica Chandler, 2001^{c g}
- Lindneromyia ilunga (Kessel & Clopton, 1970)^{c g}
- Lindneromyia kandyi Chandler, 1994^{c g}
- Lindneromyia keiseri (Kessel & Clopton, 1970)^{c g}
- Lindneromyia kerteszi (Oldenberg, 1913)
- Lindneromyia kesseli Bowden, 1973
- Lindneromyia limpukane (Kessel & Clopton, 1970)^{c g}
- Lindneromyia lindneri (Kessel, 1965)^{c g}
- Lindneromyia madagascarensis (Kessel & Clopton, 1970)^{c g}
- Lindneromyia maggioncaldai (Kessel, 1967)^{c g}
- Lindneromyia malagasiensis (Kessel & Clopton, 1970)^{c g}
- Lindneromyia malawiensis (Kessel & Clopton, 1970)^{c g}
- Lindneromyia matilei (Bowden, 1979)^{c g}
- Lindneromyia merimbulae Chandler, 1994^{c g}
- Lindneromyia minuta (Lindner, 1956)^{c g}
- Lindneromyia mogollonensis (Kessel & Kessel, 1967)^{c g}
- Lindneromyia natalensis (Brunetti, 1929)^{c g}
- Lindneromyia nigella (Shatalkin, 1980)^{c g}
- Lindneromyia pellucens (Aczel, 1958)^{c g}
- Lindneromyia pendleburyi Chandler, 1994^{c g}
- Lindneromyia peruviana (Oldenberg, 1917)
- Lindneromyia pilosa (Oldenberg, 1917)
- Lindneromyia psephos (Kessel & Clopton, 1970)^{c g}
- Lindneromyia pulchra (Snow, 1894)^{c g}
- Lindneromyia quatei Chandler, 1994^{c g}
- Lindneromyia steinleyi (Kessel & Clopton, 1970)^{c g}
- Lindneromyia stellae (Kessel & Clopton, 1970)^{c g}
- Lindneromyia stuckenbergi (Kessel & Clopton, 1970)^{c g}
- Lindneromyia ubuhle (Kessel & Clopton, 1970)^{c g}
- Lindneromyia ubumnyma (Kessel & Clopton, 1970)^{c g}
- Lindneromyia ubusuku (Kessel & Clopton, 1970)^{c g}
- Lindneromyia umbrosa (Snow, 1894)^{c g}
- Lindneromyia umusi (Kessel & Clopton, 1970)^{c g}
- Lindneromyia umzimkulwana (Kessel & Clopton, 1970)^{c g}
- Lindneromyia ussuriensis (Shatalkin, 1993)^{c g}
- Lindneromyia waui Chandler, 1994^{c g}
- Lindneromyia wheeleri (Kessel & Kessel, 1967)^{c g}
- Lindneromyia wulpii (Kertész, 1899)^{c g}

Data sources: i = ITIS, c = Catalogue of Life, g = GBIF, b = Bugguide.net
