= Callomyia venusta =

Scientific classification
- Domain: Eukaryota
- Kingdom: Animalia
- Phylum: Arthropoda
- Class: Insecta
- Order: Diptera
- Family: Platypezidae
- Genus: Callomyia
- Species: C. venusta

Binomial name
- Callomyia venusta Snow, 1894

Species of fly

Callomyia venusta is a species of flat-footed flies (insects in the family Platypezidae).
