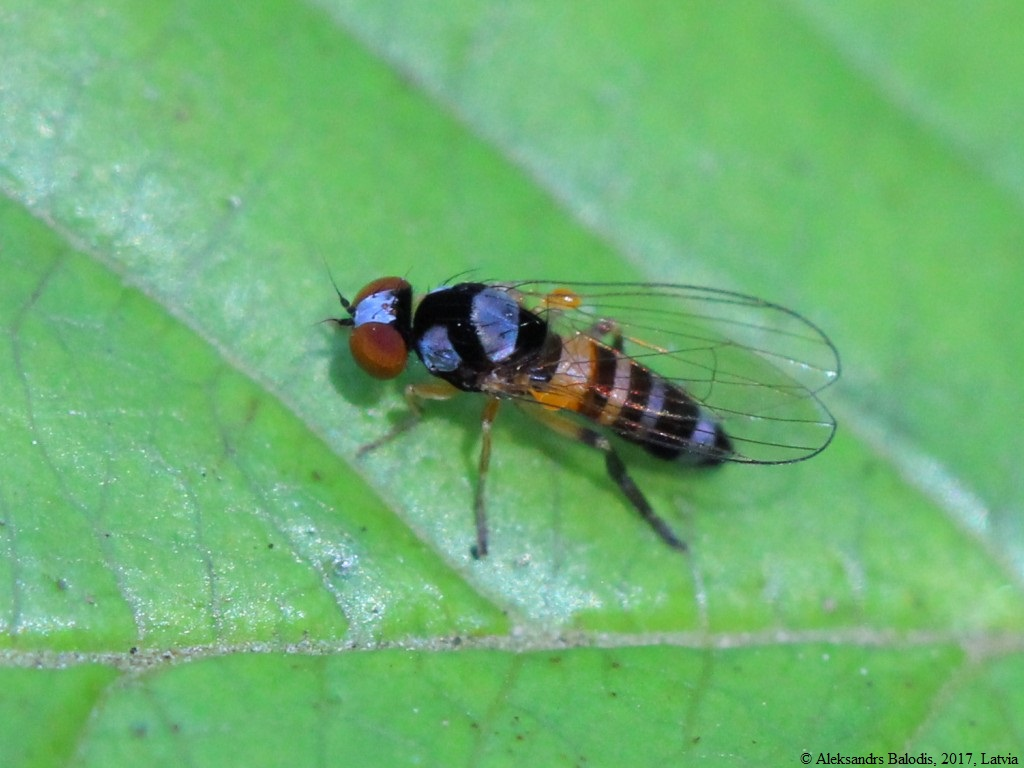
- Callomyia speciosa

Scientific classification
- Domain: Eukaryota
- Kingdom: Animalia
- Phylum: Arthropoda
- Class: Insecta
- Order: Diptera
- Family: Platypezidae
- Genus: Callomyia
- Species: C. speciosa

Binomial name
- Callomyia speciosa Meigen, 1824

Synonyms
- Callomyza humeralis Loew, 1869; Callomyia lepida Morge, 1975

= Callomyia speciosa =

Species of fly

Callomyia speciosa is a species of flat-footed flies in the family Platypezidae.
