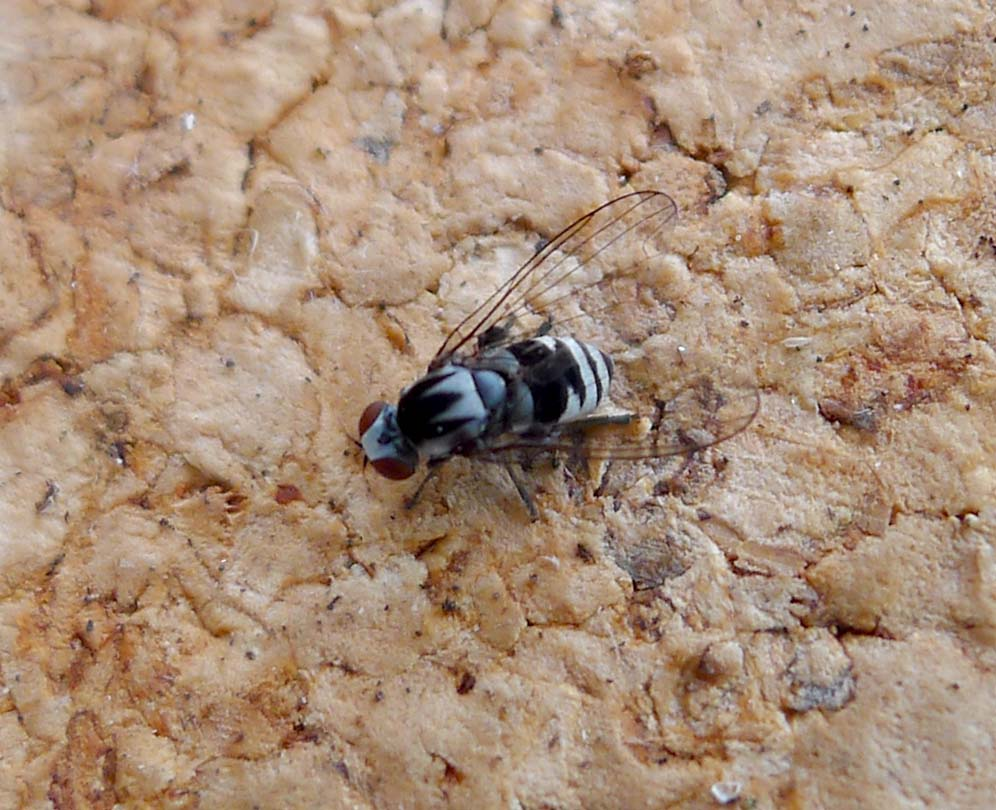

Scientific classification
- Kingdom: Animalia
- Phylum: Arthropoda
- Class: Insecta
- Order: Diptera
- Family: Platypezidae
- Subfamily: Platypezinae
- Genus: Polyporivora; Kessel & Maggioncalda, 1968

Type species
- Platypeza polypori Willard, 1914

= Polyporivora =

Genus of flies

Polyporivora is a genus of flat-footed flies (insects in the family Platypezidae). There are about eight described species in Polyporivora.

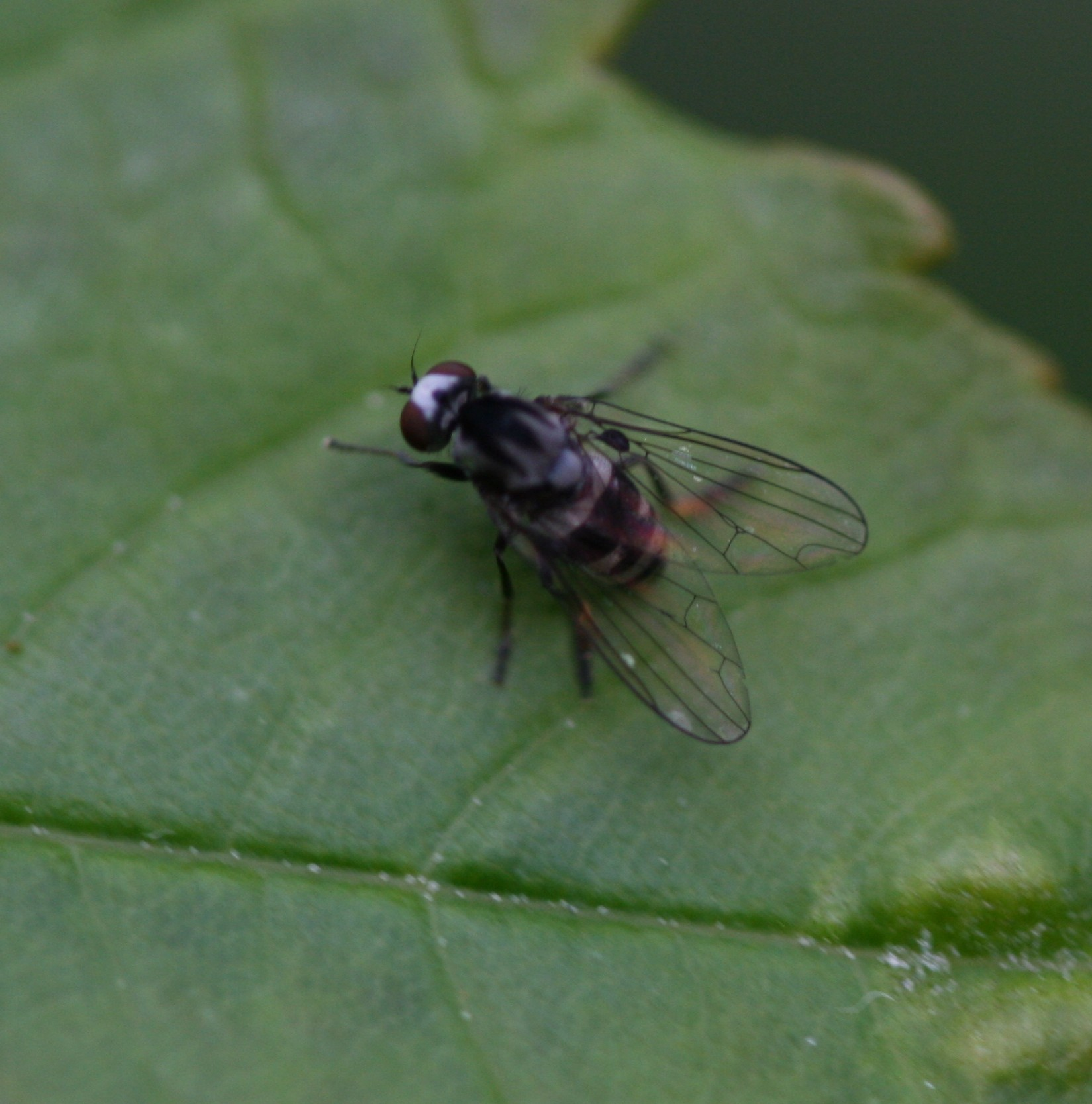

== Species ==
These eight species belong to the genus Polyporivora:

- Polyporivora amurensis Shatalkin, 1981^{c g}
- Polyporivora boletina (Fallén, 1815)^{c g}
- Polyporivora canomela Chandler, 1980
- Polyporivora hunteri (Kessel, 1959)
- Polyporivora nepalensis (Kessel, 1966)
- Polyporivora ornata (Meigen, 1838)^{c g}
- Polyporivora picta (Meigen, 1830)
- Polyporivora polypori (Willard, 1914)

Data sources: i = ITIS, c = Catalogue of Life, g = GBIF, b = Bugguide.net

== Ecology ==
Little is known about the ecology of this genus. Species of Polyporivora are typically associated with polypore fungi, where their larvae pupate in cocoons embedded within the host. Consequently, they are generally found in habitats that support polypore growth throughout the Holarctic.
