= Seri obscuripennis =

Scientific classification
- Domain: Eukaryota
- Kingdom: Animalia
- Phylum: Arthropoda
- Class: Insecta
- Order: Diptera
- Family: Platypezidae
- Genus: Seri
- Species: S. obscuripennis

Binomial name
- Seri obscuripennis (Oldenberg, 1917)

Synonyms
- Clythia obscuripennis Oldenberg, 1917

Species of fly

Seri obscuripennis is a species of fly in the genus Seri.
