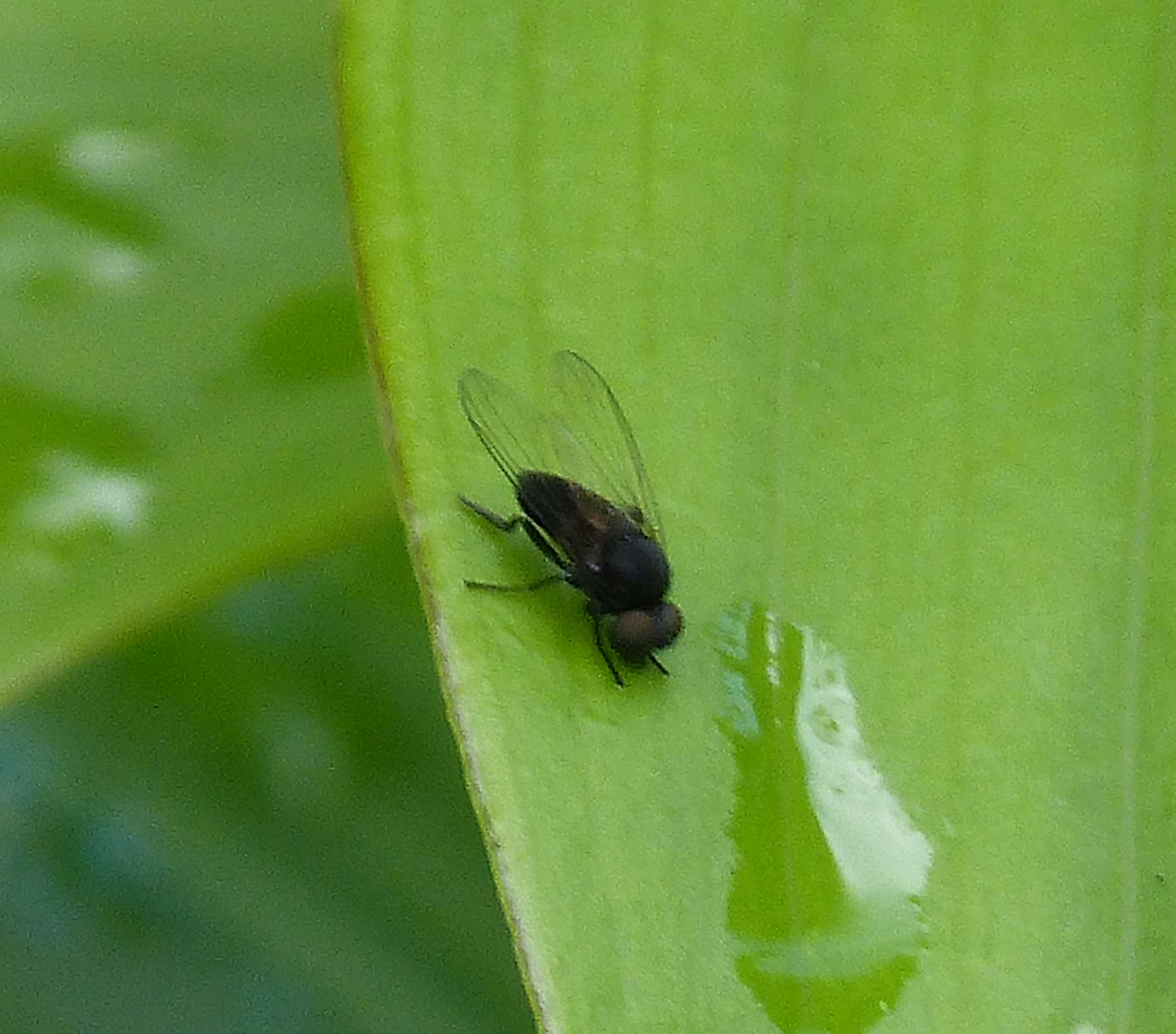
- Paraplatypeza atra

Scientific classification
- Domain: Eukaryota
- Kingdom: Animalia
- Phylum: Arthropoda
- Class: Insecta
- Order: Diptera
- Family: Platypezidae
- Genus: Paraplatypeza
- Species: P. atra

Binomial name
- Paraplatypeza atra (Meigen, 1804)

Synonyms
- Platypeza atra Meigen, 1804; Musca properans Rossi, 1794

= Paraplatypeza atra =

Species of fly

Paraplatypeza atra is a species of fly in the genus Paraplatypeza.
