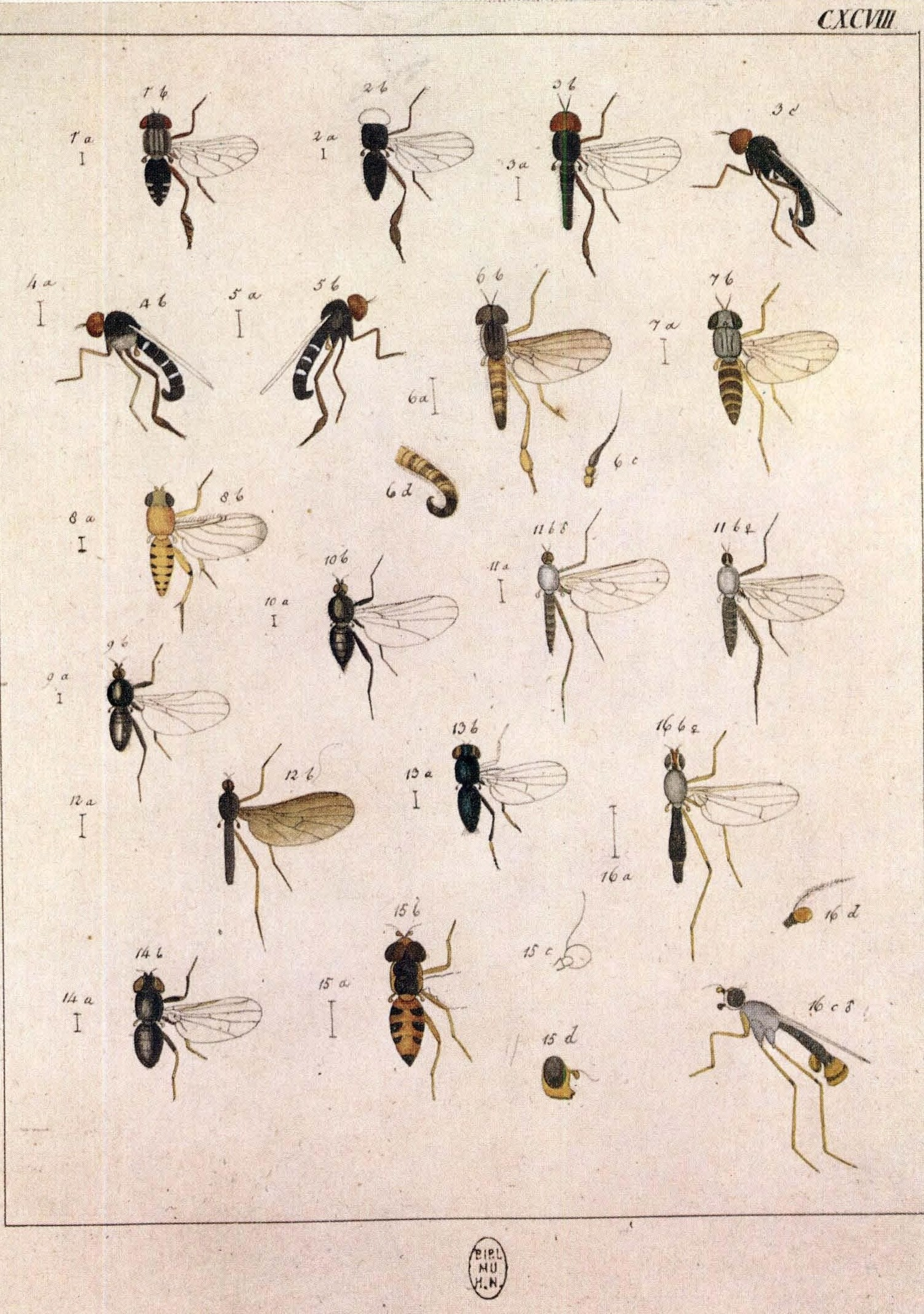
- Callomyia elegans variously named in this plate from Johann Wilhelm Meigen Europäischen Zweiflügeligen

Scientific classification
- Kingdom: Animalia
- Phylum: Arthropoda
- Class: Insecta
- Order: Diptera
- Family: Platypezidae
- Genus: Callomyia
- Species: C. elegans

Binomial name
- Callomyia elegans Meigen, 1804

Synonyms
- Cleona acuminata Swinderen, 1822

= Callomyia elegans =

Species of fly

Callomyia elegans is a species of fly in the genus Callomyia found in Europe.
