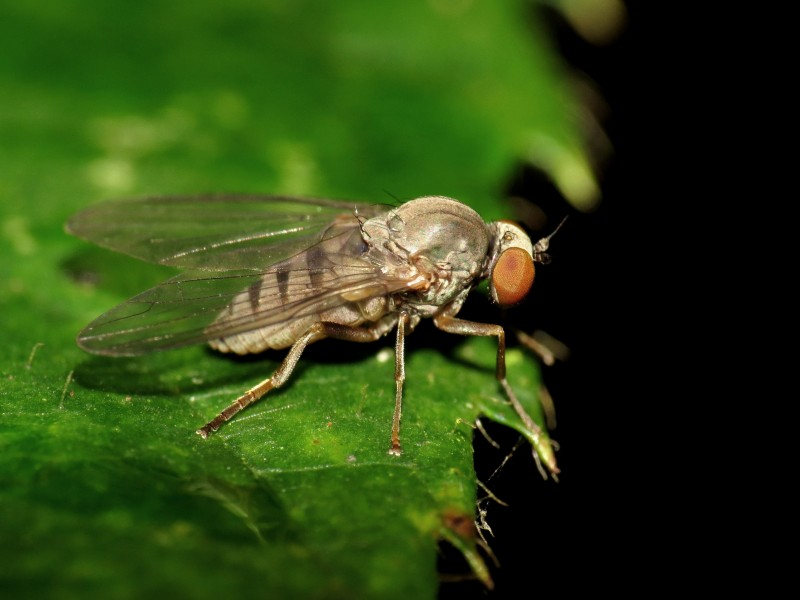
- Protoclythia modesta

Scientific classification
- Domain: Eukaryota
- Kingdom: Animalia
- Phylum: Arthropoda
- Class: Insecta
- Order: Diptera
- Family: Platypezidae
- Genus: Protoclythia
- Species: P. modesta

Binomial name
- Protoclythia modesta (Zetterstedt, 1844)

Synonyms
- Platypeza modesta Zetterstedt, 1844; Platypeza rufipes Morge, 1975

= Protoclythia modesta =

Species of fly

Protoclythia modesta is a species of flat-footed flies in the family Platypezidae.
