= Platypezina connexa =

Scientific classification
- Domain: Eukaryota
- Kingdom: Animalia
- Phylum: Arthropoda
- Class: Insecta
- Order: Diptera
- Family: Platypezidae
- Genus: Platypezina
- Species: P. connexa

Binomial name
- Platypezina connexa (Boheman, 1858)

Synonyms
- Platypeza connexa Boheman, 1858

Species of fly

Platypezina connexa is a species of fly in the genus Platypezina
