= Pamelamyia =

Scientific classification
- Domain: Eukaryota
- Kingdom: Animalia
- Phylum: Arthropoda
- Class: Insecta
- Order: Diptera
- Family: Platypezidae
- Genus: Pamelamyia; Kessel & Clopton, 1970
- Species: P. stuckenbergorum

Binomial name
- Pamelamyia stuckenbergorum Kessel & Clopton, 1970

Genus of flies

Pamelamyia is a genus of flat-footed flies (insects in the family Platypezidae). There is one described species, Pamelamyia stuckenbergorum.
