= Metaclythia =

Scientific classification
- Domain: Eukaryota
- Kingdom: Animalia
- Phylum: Arthropoda
- Class: Insecta
- Order: Diptera
- Family: Platypezidae
- Genus: Metaclythia; Kessel, 1952
- Species: M. currani

Binomial name
- Metaclythia currani Kessel, 1952

Genus of flies

Metaclythia is a genus of flat-footed flies (insects in the family Platypezidae). There is one described species, Metaclythia currani.
