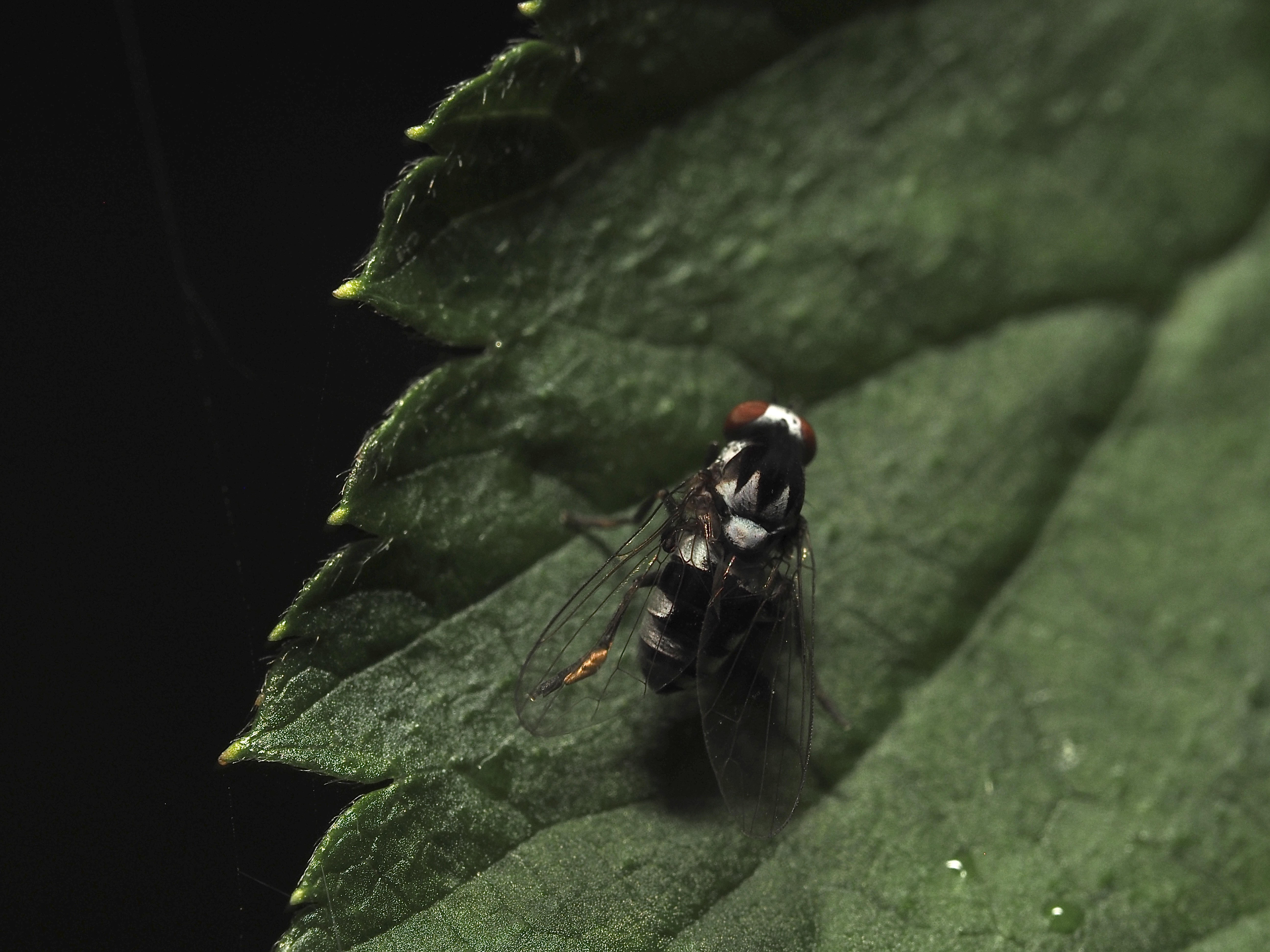
- Polyporivora polypori, Goldstream Provincial Park, British Columbia

Scientific classification
- Kingdom: Animalia
- Phylum: Arthropoda
- Class: Insecta
- Order: Diptera
- Family: Platypezidae
- Subfamily: Platypezinae; Fallén, 1815

Genera
- Platypeza; Paraplatypeza; Polyporivora; Lindneromyia; Agathomyia

= Platypezinae =

Subfamily of flat-footed flies

Platypezinae is a subfamily of small, fungus-associated flies in the family Platypezidae. Members of this subfamily are characterized by their flattened bodies and distinctive wing venation, typical of the flat-footed flies.

Approximately 250 species of Platypezinae have been described worldwide. The family Platypezidae is divided into four recognized subfamilies, of which Platypezinae includes at least 14 valid genera. Among these genera, Microsania is cosmopolitan and represents the most widely distributed genus within documented regions, while Agathomyia is primarily Holarctic, with a few species occurring in the Oriental region.

== Description ==
Members of the subfamily Platypezinae are small flies, typically reaching a body length of about 6 millimetres (¼ inch) or less.

In females, the upper frontal region of the head (the frons) bears only a few short, stiff setae that are scattered rather than densely arranged.

Across the thorax (scutum), most other members of the family Platypezidae display both a central line of acrostichal bristles and paired dorsocentral rows. In Platypezinae, however, the acrostichal bristles are lacking, leaving a bare strip between the dorsocentral rows.

The legs are relatively short. On the hind legs, the tibia and tarsus are broadened, with the first tarsal segment being compressed from the sides and shorter than the combined length of the next three segments. The terminal tarsal segments are also laterally flattened.
