= Platypezina diversa =

Scientific classification
- Domain: Eukaryota
- Kingdom: Animalia
- Phylum: Arthropoda
- Class: Insecta
- Order: Diptera
- Family: Platypezidae
- Genus: Platypezina
- Species: P. diversa

Binomial name
- Platypezina diversa (Johnson, 1923)

Synonyms
- Platypezoides diversa Johnson, 1923

Species of fly

Platypezina diversa is a species of fly in the genus Platypezina.
