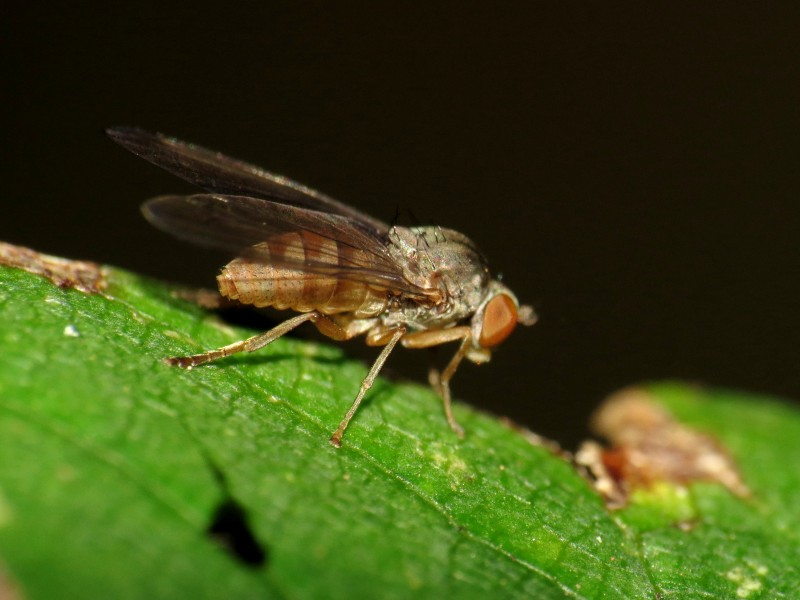
- Protoclythia rufa

Scientific classification
- Domain: Eukaryota
- Kingdom: Animalia
- Phylum: Arthropoda
- Class: Insecta
- Order: Diptera
- Family: Platypezidae
- Genus: Protoclythia
- Species: P. rufa

Binomial name
- Protoclythia rufa (Meigen, 1830)

Synonyms
- Platypeza lutescens Curtis, 1837; Platypeza rufa Meigen, 1830; Platypeza rufiventris Macquart, 1835

= Protoclythia rufa =

Species of fly

Protoclythia rufa is a species of flat-footed flies in the family Platypezidae.
