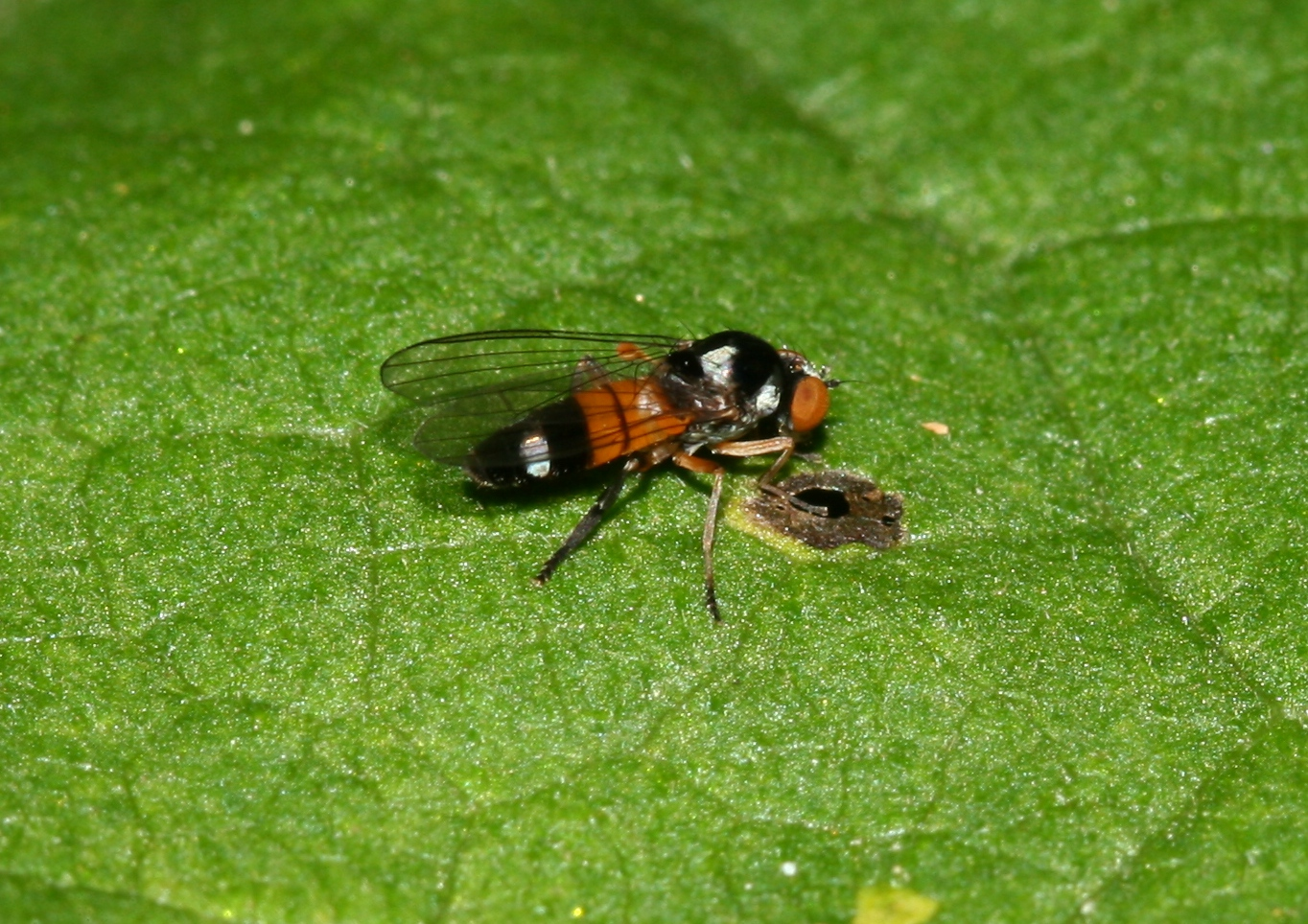
- Callomyia amoena

Scientific classification
- Domain: Eukaryota
- Kingdom: Animalia
- Phylum: Arthropoda
- Class: Insecta
- Order: Diptera
- Family: Platypezidae
- Genus: Callomyia
- Species: C. amoena

Binomial name
- Callomyia amoena Meigen, 1824

= Callomyia amoena =

Species of fly

Callomyia amoena is a species of flat-footed flies in the family Platypezidae.
