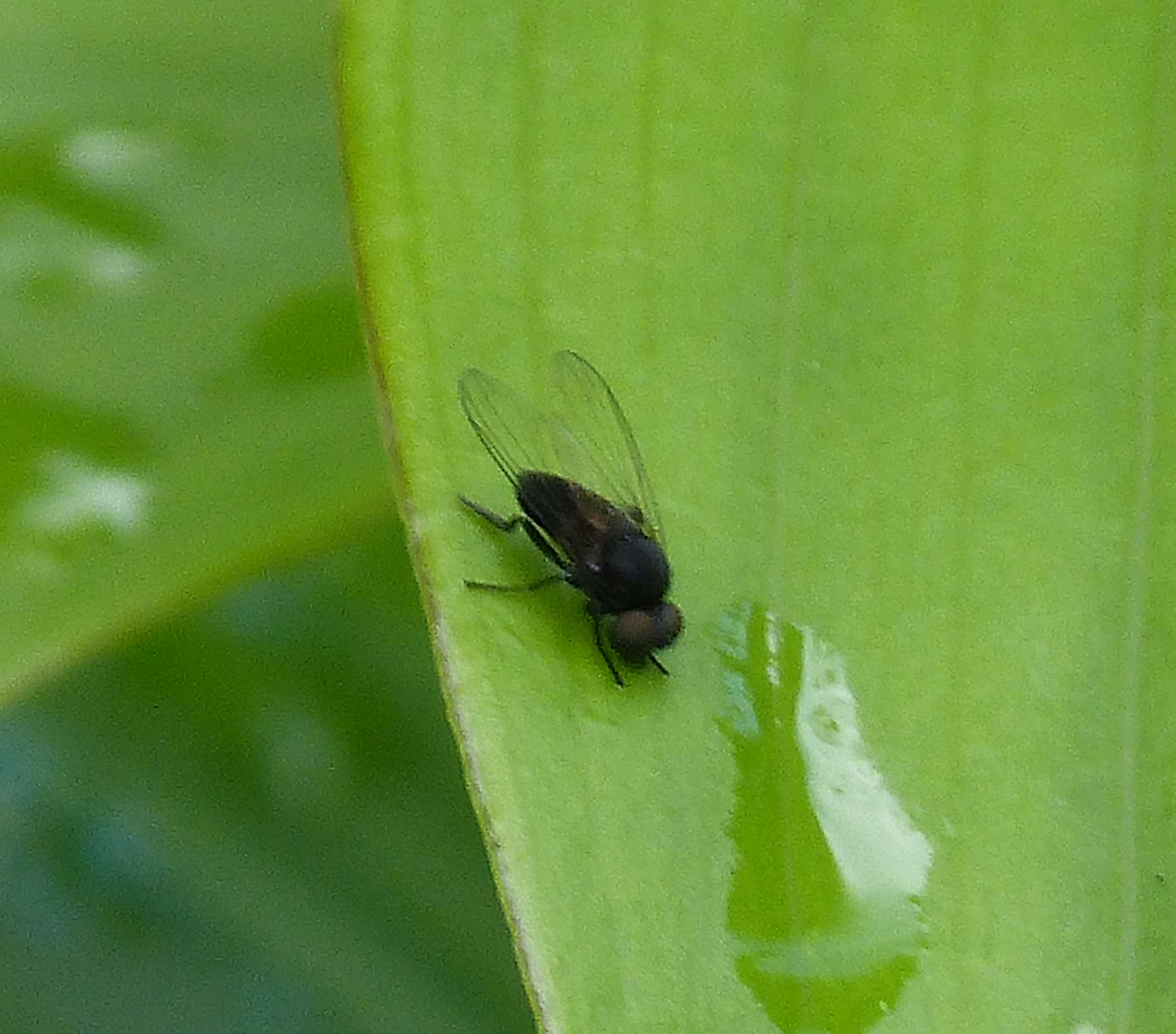
- Paraplatypeza atra

Scientific classification
- Domain: Eukaryota
- Kingdom: Animalia
- Phylum: Arthropoda
- Class: Insecta
- Order: Diptera
- Family: Platypezidae
- Subfamily: Platypezinae
- Genus: Paraplatypeza; Kessel & Maggioncalda, 1968

Type species
- Clythia coraxa Kessel, 1950

Synonyms
- Kesselimyia Vanhara, 1981

= Paraplatypeza =

Genus of flies

Paraplatypeza is a genus of flat-footed flies in the family Platypezidae.

== Species ==
- P. angustifrons Shatalkin, 1985
- P. atra (Meigen, 1804)
- P. bicincta (Szilády, 1941)
- P. celaena Bowden, 1973
- P. chandleri (Vanhara, 1981)
- P. congoensis Kessel & Clopton, 1970
- P. coraxa (Kessel, 1950)
- P. ikekeba Kessel & Clopton, 1970
- P. nudifrons Shatalkin, 1985
- P. rara Shatalkin, 1982
- P. triangulata Shatalkin, 1982
- P. velutina (Loew, 1866)
- P. zaitzevi Shatalkin, 1985
