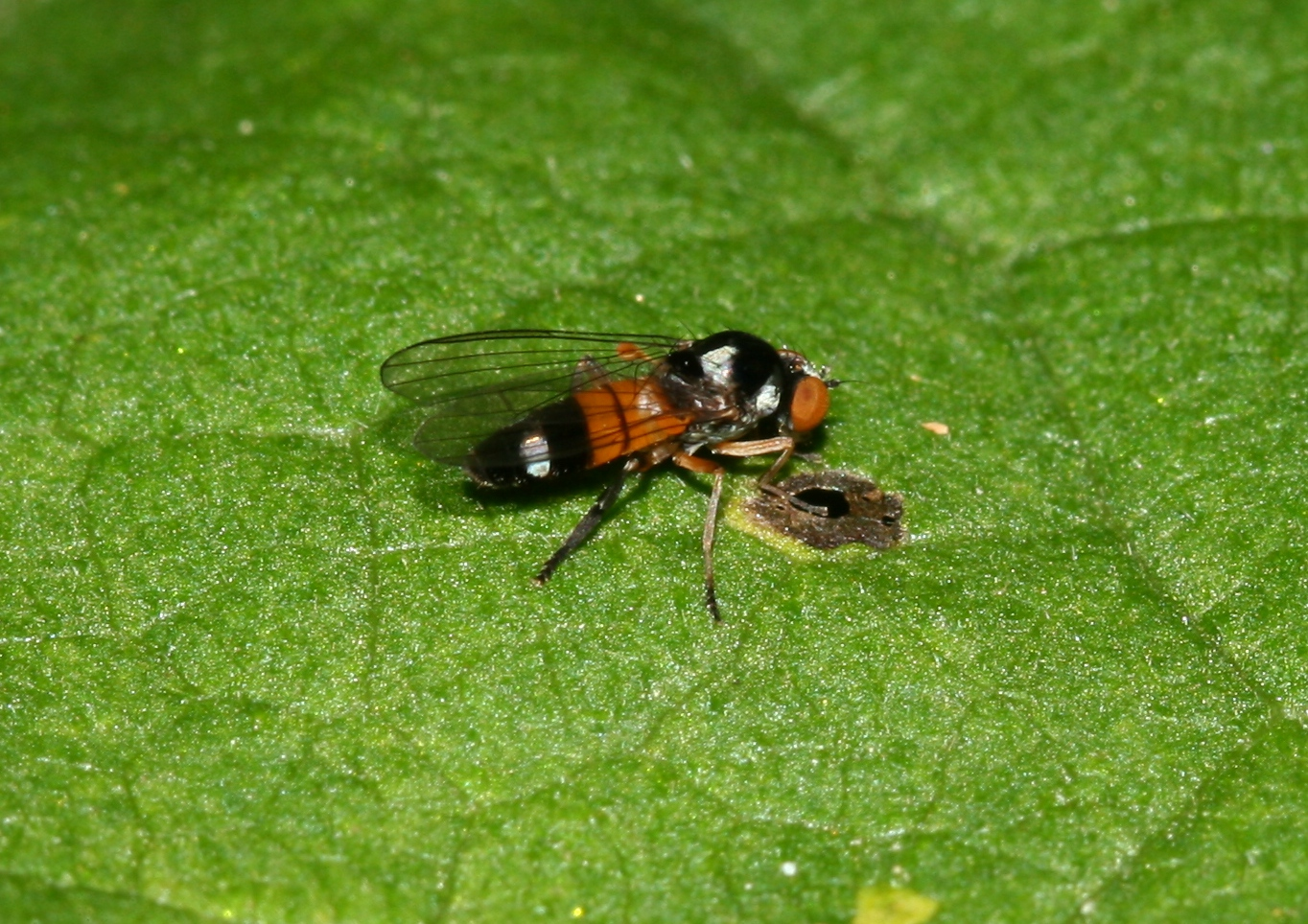
- Callomyia amoena

Scientific classification
- Domain: Eukaryota
- Kingdom: Animalia
- Phylum: Arthropoda
- Class: Insecta
- Order: Diptera
- Family: Platypezidae
- Subfamily: Callomyiinae
- Genus: Callomyia; Meigen, 1804

Synonyms
- Cleona Meigen, 1800 (name suppressed); Cleona Swinderen, 1822; Heteroneura Fallén, 1810; Callomyza Fallén, 1815; Calomyia Von Roser, 1840; Callimyia Agassiz In Agassiz & Loew, 1846

= Callomyia =

Genus of flies

Female Callomyia amoena

Callomyia is a genus of flies in the family Platypezidae. Some species can be found in Belgium.

== Species ==
- C. admirabilis Shatalkin, 1980
- C. amoena Meigen, 1824
- C. argentea Cumming, 2016
- C. arnaudi Cumming, 2016
- C. bertae Kessel, 1961
- C. browni Cumming, 2016
- C. calla Kessel, 1949
- C. cleta Kessel, 1949
- C. coei Kessel, 1966
- C. corvina Kessel, 1949
- C. dives Zetterstedt, 1838
- C. dorsimaculata Shatalkin, 1982
- C. elegans Meigen, 1804
- C. fortunata Frey, 1936
- C. gilloglyorum Kessel, 1961
- C. krivosheinae Shatalkin, 1982
- C. proxima Johnson, 1916
- C. saibhira Chandler, 1976
- C. sonora Shatalkin, 1993
- C. speciosa Meigen, 1824
- C. triangulata Tkoč, 2012
- C. velutina Johnson, 1916
- C. venusta Snow, 1894
