= Calotarsa insignis =

Scientific classification
- Domain: Eukaryota
- Kingdom: Animalia
- Phylum: Arthropoda
- Class: Insecta
- Order: Diptera
- Family: Platypezidae
- Genus: Calotarsa
- Species: C. insignis

Binomial name
- Calotarsa insignis Aldrich, 1906

Species of fly

Calotarsa insignis is a species of flat-footed flies (insects in the family Platypezidae).
