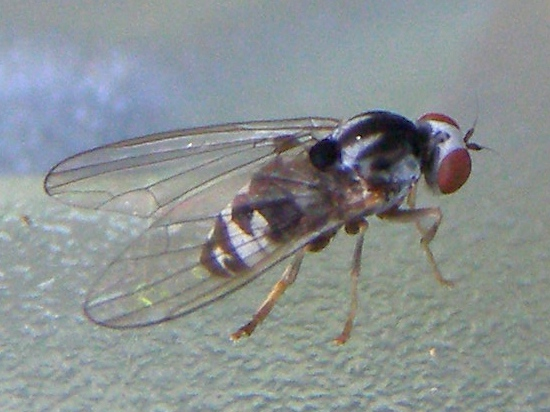
- Polyporivora picta, female

Scientific classification
- Domain: Eukaryota
- Kingdom: Animalia
- Phylum: Arthropoda
- Class: Insecta
- Order: Diptera
- Family: Platypezidae
- Genus: Polyporivora
- Species: P. picta

Binomial name
- Polyporivora picta (Meigen, 1830)

Synonyms
- Platypeza picta Meigen, 1830; Platypeza fumipennis Walker, 1835; Platypeza fumipennis Zetterstedt, 1838; Platypeza sophia Guérin, 1835; Platypeza superba Kowarz, 1867

= Polyporivora picta =

Species of fly

Polyporivora picta is a species of flat-footed flies in the family Platypezidae. It is found throughout Northern and Central Europe.

== Morphology ==
Like almost all members of its family, P. picta displays a strong sexual dimorphism. Females are grey and black whereas males are entirely black with eyes touching in the center of the head. Females can be differentiated from the very similar P. ornata through their black scutellum (grey on P. ornata). Another important characteristic for identification is wing venation.

== Ecology ==
P. picta is a parasite in its larval stage and can only be found in and around forests in which its host, Trametes versicolor, grows. The adult flies fly from September until October. During these months they can be seen running in chaotic zig-zag-lines on leaves of various plants. They lay their eggs on fruiting bodies of T. versicolor which serve as food and shelter for the larvae. Up to 40 individuals have been reported in a single fruiting body. As a larva, P. picta enters Winter diapause. In Spring, the larvae leave the fungus in order to pupate in the soil.
