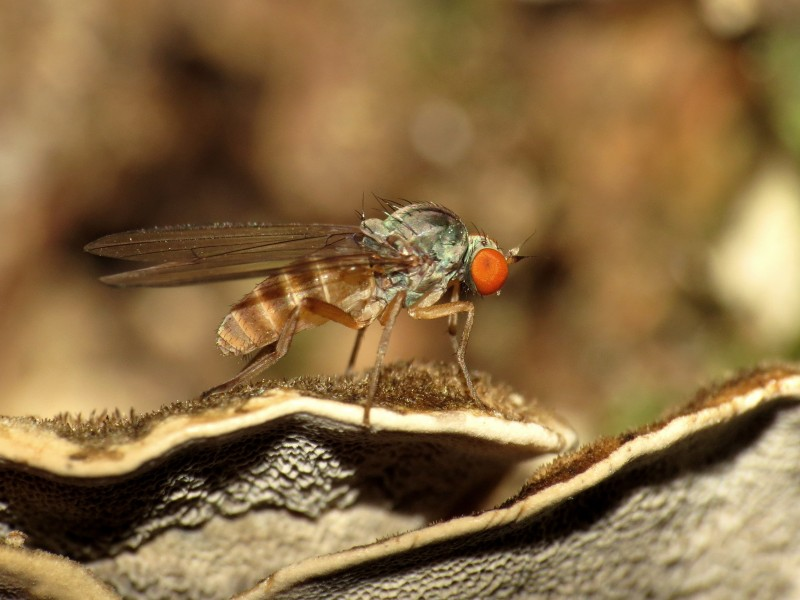

Scientific classification
- Domain: Eukaryota
- Kingdom: Animalia
- Phylum: Arthropoda
- Class: Insecta
- Order: Diptera
- Family: Platypezidae
- Genus: Agathomyia
- Species: A. falleni

Binomial name
- Agathomyia falleni (Zetterstedt, 1819)

Synonyms
- Callomyia fallenii Meigen, 1824; Callomyia megerlei Meigen, 1824; Callomyza falleni Zetterstedt, 1819

= Agathomyia falleni =

Species of fly

Agathomyia falleni is a species of flat-footed fly in the family Platypezidae.
