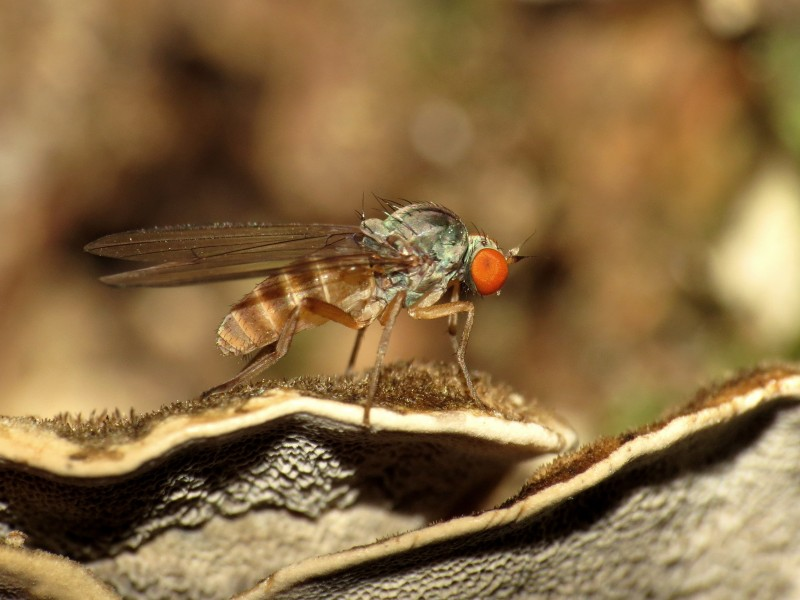
- Agathomyia falleni

Scientific classification
- Kingdom: Animalia
- Phylum: Arthropoda
- Class: Insecta
- Order: Diptera
- Family: Platypezidae
- Subfamily: Callomyiinae; Fallén, 1815

Genera
- Agathomyia; Callomyia

= Callomyiinae =

Subfamily of flat-footed flies

Callomyiinae is a subfamily of flat-footed flies (family Platypezidae). Members of this subfamily, such as the Palaearctic species Agathomyia falleni, are characterized by a distinctive row of acrostichal bristles along the middle of the thorax, which differentiates them from related subfamilies.
