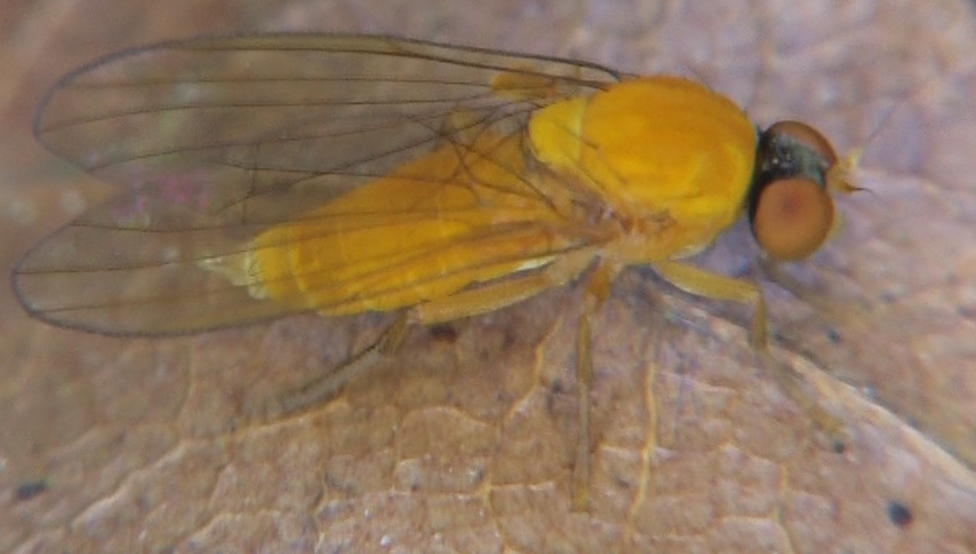
- Agathomyia wankowiczii

Scientific classification
- Domain: Eukaryota
- Kingdom: Animalia
- Phylum: Arthropoda
- Class: Insecta
- Order: Diptera
- Family: Platypezidae
- Genus: Agathomyia
- Species: A. wankowiczii

Binomial name
- Agathomyia wankowiczii (Schnabl, 1884)

Synonyms
- Callomyia wankowiczii Schnabl, 1884

= Agathomyia wankowiczii =

Species of fly

Agathomyia wankowiczii is a species of flat-footed fly in the family Platypezidae. Its larvae develop in galls on Ganoderma applanatum.
