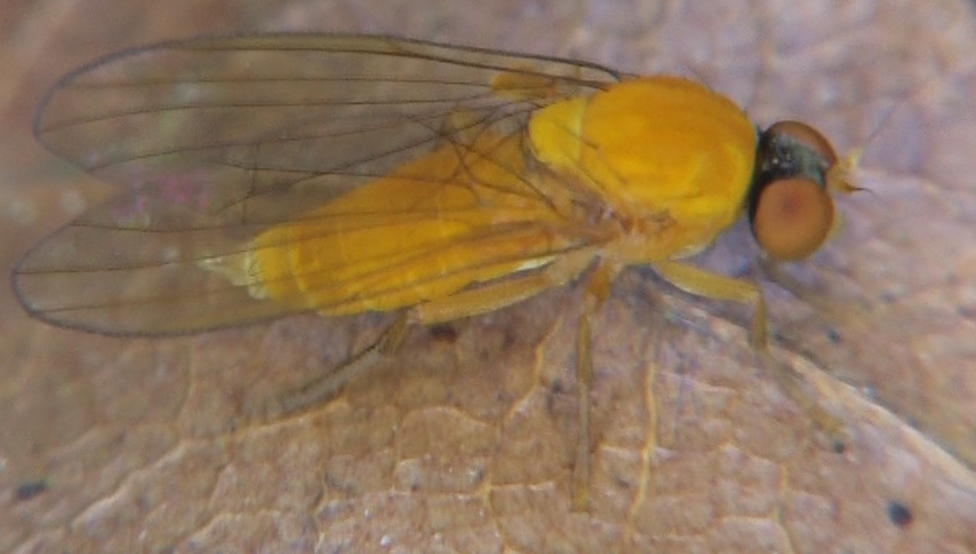
- Agathomyia wankowiczii

Scientific classification
- Kingdom: Animalia
- Phylum: Arthropoda
- Class: Insecta
- Order: Diptera
- Family: Platypezidae
- Subfamily: Callomyiinae
- Genus: Agathomyia; Verrall, 1901

Type species
- Callomyza antennata Zetterstedt, 1819

= Agathomyia =

Genus of flies

Agathomyia is a genus of flat-footed flies in the family Platypezidae. Agothomyia is found in every zoogeographic region except the Afrotropical and is the largest genus of Platypezidae, comprising more than 50 species.

== Species ==
- A. aestiva Kessel, 1949
- A. alaskensis Kessel, 1961
- A. antennata (Zetterstedt, 1819)
- A. aquilonia Kessel, 1961
- A. argentata Oldenberg, 1917
- A. arossi Kessel, 1961
- A. aurantiaca (Bezzi, 1893)
- A. austrocollinella Chandler, 1994
- A. aversa Shatalkin, 1981
- A. bella (Williston, 1892)
- A. bellatula Shatalkin, 1980
- A. brooksi Johnson, 1923
- A. canadensis Johnson, 1923
- A. cinerea (Zetterstedt, 1852)
- A. colei Kessel, 1961
- A. collini Verrall, 1901
- A. cushmani Johnson, 1916
- A. decolor Kessel, 1961
- A. dichroa Shatalkin, 1980
- A. divergens (Loew, 1866)
- A. dubia Johnson, 1916
- A. elegantula (Fallén, 1815)
- A. eocenica Tkoc, 2019
- A. falleni (Zetterstedt, 1819)
- A. fenderi Kessel, 1949
- A. fulva (Johnson, 1908)
- A. gorodkovi Shatalkin, 1982
- A. helvella Chandler, 1980
- A. intermedia Shatalkin, 1980
- A. laffooni Kessel, 1961
- A. leechi Kessel, 1961
- A. lucifuga Kessel, 1961
- A. lundbecki Chandler, 1985
- A. lutea Cole, 1919
- A. macneilli Kessel, 1961
- A. monticola Johnson, 1923
- A. nemophila Kessel, 1961
- A. nigriventris Oldenberg, 1917
- A. obscura Johnson, 1916
- A. perplexa Johnson, 1916
- A. pluvialis Chandler, 1994
- A. pulchella (Johnson, 1908)
- A. semirubra Meijere, 1914
- A. setipes Oldenberg, 1917
- A. sexmaculata (Roser, 1840)
- A. shaanxiensis Han & Yang, 2017
- A. stonei Kessel, 1961
- A. sylvania Kessel, 1961
- A. talpula (Loew, 1870)
- A. tephrea Shatalkin, 1980
- A. thoracica Oldenberg, 1913
- A. tibialis Shatalkin, 1985
- A. umacibise Kessel & Clopton, 1970
- A. unicolor Oldenberg, 1928
- A. vanduzeei Johnson, 1916
- A. vernalis Shatalkin, 1981
- A. viduella (Zetterstedt, 1838)
- A. wankowiczii (Schnabl, 1884)
- A. woodella Chandler, 1985
- A. zetterstedti (Wahlberg, 1844)
- A. zonula Shatalkin, 1982
