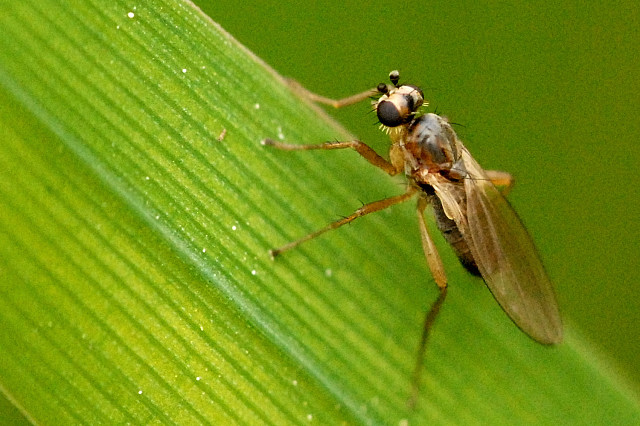
- Lonchoptera lutea

Scientific classification
- Kingdom: Animalia
- Phylum: Arthropoda
- Clade: Pancrustacea
- Class: Insecta
- Order: Diptera
- Family: Lonchopteridae
- Genus: Lonchoptera; Meigen, 1803

Type species
- Lonchoptera lutea Panzer, 1809

Synonyms
- Dipsa Fallén, 1810; Lonchopteryx Stephens, 1829 (unjustified emendation); Musidora Meigen, 1800 (suppressed); Spilolonchoptera? Yang, 1998; Homolonchoptera? Yang, 1998

= Lonchoptera =

Genus of flies

Lonchoptera is a genus of spear-winged flies (Lonchopteridae). Their common name refers to their subacute (pointed) wings, which have a distinct and sexually dimorphic venation.

== Description ==
Species in Lonchoptera are tiny to small, at 2–5 mm (0.079–0.197 in), slender, and yellow to brownish-black bristly.

The larvae are dorsally flattened, with two pairs of head bristles, and feed on rotting vegetable matter, including in one case brussels sprouts.

This genus can be distinguished from other spear-winged flies by several traits:

- foreleg tibiae have dorsal setae in the middle
- foreleg tarsi thinner than foreleg tibiae
- pointed wingtip without apical brown spot.

== Species ==
Species include:

- Lonchoptera africana Adams, 1905
- Lonchoptera alfhildae Andersson, 1971
- Lonchoptera anderssoni Joseph & Parui, 1976
- Lonchoptera annikaae Andersson, 1971
- Lonchoptera apicalis (Okada, 1935)
- Lonchoptera barberi Klymko, 2008
- Lonchoptera bifurcata (Fallén, 1810)
- Lonchoptera birmanica Andersson, 1971
- Lonchoptera birmensis Andersson, 1971
- Lonchoptera casanova Andersson, 1971
- Lonchoptera elinorae Andersson, 1971
- Lonchoptera excavata Yang & Chen, 1995
- Lonchoptera fallax de Meijere, 1906
- Lonchoptera hakonensis Matsumura, 1916
- Lonchoptera impicta Zetterstedt, 1848
- Lonchoptera japonica Matsumura, 1915
- Lonchoptera kamtschatkana (Czerny, 1934)
- Lonchoptera longiphallus Klymko, 2008
- Lonchoptera lutea Panzer, 1809
- Lonchoptera maculata Smith, 1974
- Lonchoptera malaisei Andersson, 1971
- Lonchoptera megaloba Klymko, 2008
- Lonchoptera meijerei Collin, 1938
- Lonchoptera nerana Vaillant, 1989
- Lonchoptera nevadica Vaillant, 1989
- Lonchoptera nigrociliata Duda, 1927
- Lonchoptera nitidifrons Strobl, 1898
- Lonchoptera occidentalis Curran, 1934
- Lonchoptera orientalis (Kertész, 1914)
- Lonchoptera pictipennis Bezzi, 1899
- Lonchoptera pinglongshanensis Dong, Pang & Yang, 2008
- Lonchoptera pipi Andersson, 1971
- Lonchoptera platytarsis (Okada, 1935)
- Lonchoptera pseudolutea Whittington & Beuk, 2022
- Lonchoptera rava Whittington, 1991
- Lonchoptera sapporensis Matsumura, 1915
- Lonchoptera scutellata Stein, 1890
- Lonchoptera stackelbergi (Czerny, 1934)
- Lonchoptera strobli de Meijere, 1906
- Lonchoptera transvaalensis Stuckenberg, 1963
- Lonchoptera tristis Meigen, 1824
- Lonchoptera ugandensis Whittington, 1991
- Lonchoptera unicolor Dong, Pang & Yang, 2008
- Lonchoptera uniseta Curran, 1934
- Lonchoptera vaillanti Zwick, 2004
- Lonchoptera vesperis Stuckenberg, 1963

The entomologist Andrew E. Whittington in 2024 suggested that the genera Homolonchoptera and Spilolonchoptera are junior synonyms of Lonchoptera giving the genus additional eight species, being the following:

- Lonchoptera brevicaudata Dong & Yang, 2013
- Lonchoptera chinica Yang, 1998
- Lonchoptera curtifurcata Yang,1998
- Lonchoptera hainanensis Gao, Zhang & Yang 2021
- Lonchoptera longisetosa Yang & Chen,1998
- Lonchoptera tautineura Yang, 1998
- Lonchoptera yangi Dong & Yang, 2013
- Lonchoptera zhejiangensis Gao,Zhang & Yang 2021
