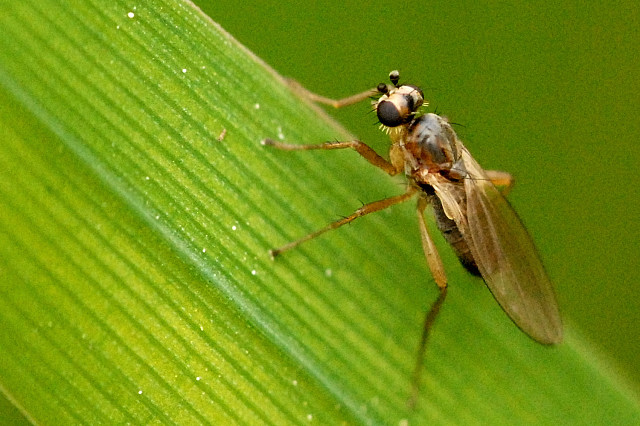

Scientific classification
- Kingdom: Animalia
- Phylum: Arthropoda
- Clade: Pancrustacea
- Class: Insecta
- Order: Diptera
- Family: Lonchopteridae
- Genus: Lonchoptera
- Species: L. lutea

Binomial name
- Lonchoptera lutea Panzer, 1809

Synonyms
- Lonchoptera cinerea Meijere, 1906; Lonchoptera flavicauda Meigen, 1824; Lonchoptera riparia Meigen, 1824; Lonchoptera palustris Meigen, 1824; Lonchoptera punctum Meigen, 1824; Lonchoptera trilineata Zetterstedt, 1848; Lonchoptera nigrimana Meigen, 1824; Lonchoptera thoracica Meigen, 1824; Lonchoptera griseola Meigen in Morge, 1975

= Lonchoptera lutea =

Species of fly

Lonchoptera lutea, the yellow spear-winged fly, is the type species of the genus Lonchoptera.

Adults vary a great deal in colour, from yellow to dark brown. The anteroventral bristle of the middle tibia is missing from the distal half. Scutellum brown to yellow. first and second antennal segments yellow, the third being dark, with a subapical arista.

Unlike most Lonchoptera, Lonchoptera lutea shows a marked preference for unshaded habitats. It is widespread and often very common throughout most of Europe, extending into parts of Asia.
