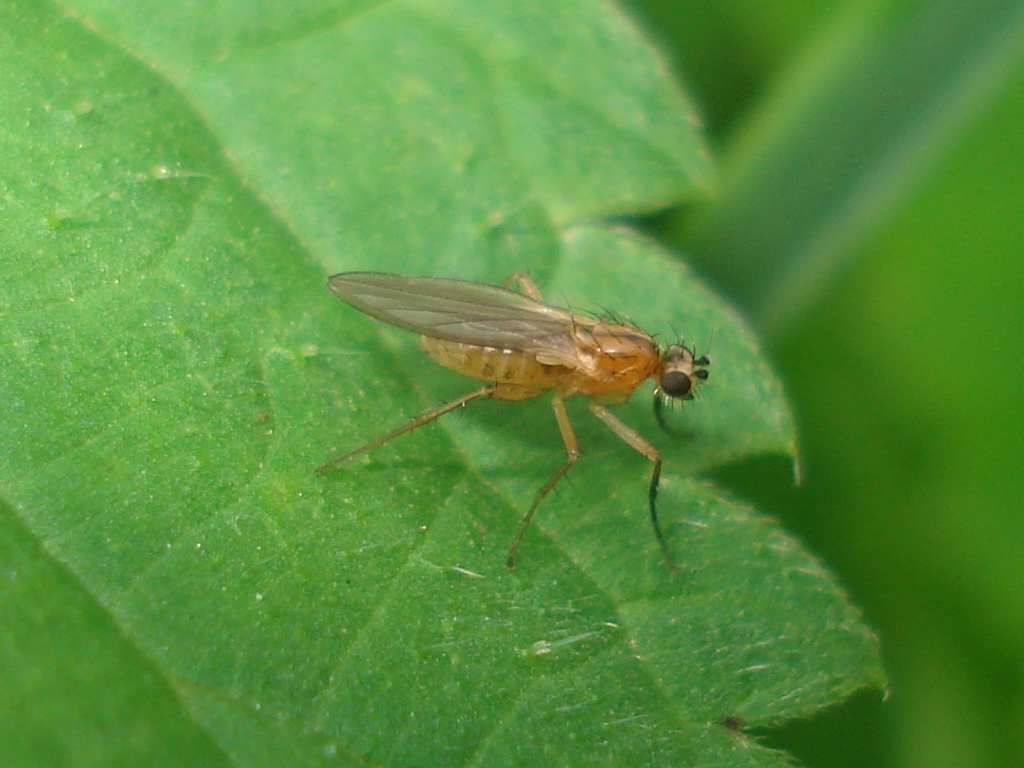

Scientific classification
- Kingdom: Animalia
- Phylum: Arthropoda
- Clade: Pancrustacea
- Class: Insecta
- Order: Diptera
- Family: Lonchopteridae
- Genus: Lonchoptera
- Species: L. bifurcata

Binomial name
- Lonchoptera bifurcata (Fallen, 1810)

Synonyms
- Lonchoptera dubia Curran, 1934; Lonchoptera pseudotrilineata Strobl, 1899; Lonchoptera cinerella Zetterstedt, 1838; Lonchoptera lacustris Meigen, 1824; Lonchoptera rivalis Meigen, 1824; Lonchopteryx leachii Stephens, 1829; Dipsa furcata Fallén, 1823

= Lonchoptera bifurcata =

Species of fly

Lonchoptera bifurcata is a species of spear-winged or pointed-winged flies in the family Lonchopteridae. It has a Holarctic distribution and is present in Europe, Asia and North America.

== Description ==
An adult Lonchoptera bifurcata is about 2-5mm (0.08-0.2in) long. In North America, it can be distinguished from closely related species by having pale-coloured bristles behind the eyes, several bristles on the front of the tibiae of the first pair of legs (other species have a single bristle), and wings with fairly sharp points. There are two colour phases, light tan and black. Dark phase individuals may have a completely dark abdomen or pale longitudinal markings on the abdomen.

== Habitat ==
Adults of Lonchoptera bifurcata are typically found around damp lawns and in ditches, while the larvae develop in decaying organic matter.

== Biology ==
In North America, males of this species are very rarely seen, and the females produce young by parthenogenesis. This also seems to be the case in other parts of the insect's distribution.
