= Eduard Becher =

Austrian entomologist

Eduard Becher (30 September 1856, Vienna - 11 November 1886, Vienna) was an entomologist from the Austro-Hungarian Empire who worked on Diptera.

He was the author of an article entitled 'Zur Kenntnis der Kopfbildung der Dipteren' ("Contribution to the knowledge of the head formation of the Diptera") Wiener Entomologische Zeitung, 1: 49-54 (1882). In this he identified the divisions of the Cyclorrhapha, Aschiza and Schizophora, a division he based on differences in the frontal region of the head. Aschiza have no ptilinum or associated suture, Schizophora have both ptilinum and its suture.

Becher's collection of Austrian Diptera is in the Naturhistorisches Museum, Vienna.

== Other work ==
- 1886. Insecten von Jan Mayen. Beobachtungs-Ergebnisse, Osterreichischen Polarstation Jan Mayen 3: 59-66.

== Bibliography ==
- Anonym 1887: [Becher, E.] Leopoldina 23: 53
- Anonym 1887: [Biographien] Zool. Anz. 10:152
- Contreras-Lichtenberg, R. 2003: Die Geschichte der Dipterologie am Wiener Naturhistorischen Museum. Denisia 8 47-55.
- Evenhuis, N. L. 1997: Litteratura taxonomica dipterorum (1758–1930). Volume 1 (A-K); Volume 2 (L-Z). Leiden, Backhuys Publishers.
- Mik, J. 1886: [Becher, E.] Wien. ent. Ztg. 5:352
- Steindachner 1897: [Becher, E.] Ann. Naturhist. Hofmus. 2:7-9
