= Microsania =

Scientific classification
- Kingdom: Animalia
- Phylum: Arthropoda
- Class: Insecta
- Order: Diptera
- Family: Platypezidae
- Subfamily: Microsaniinae
- Genus: Microsania; Zetterstedt, 1837

Type species
- Cyrtoma stigmaticalis Zetterstedt, 1838

Synonyms
- Microcyrta Bigot, 1857 Platytelma Rondani, 1856 Pachypeza Lioy, 1863

Genus of flies

Microsania is a genus of flat-footed flies in the family Platypezidae and the sole genus in the smoke fly subfamily Microsaniinae. This cosmopolitan genus is typically attracted to smoke, such as from campfires in natural park settings. Unlike other members of the family, adults often carry variable loads of phoretic mites. The larval habits remain unknown, but some associated mites have been identified as dung- and compost-breeding species of the genus Macrocheles, suggesting these substrates may serve as potential sites for late-stage larvae prior to pupation.

== Species ==
- M. albani Chandler, 1994
- M. alticola Collart, 1955
- M. arthuri Chandler, 1994
- M. australis Collart, 1938
- M. boycei Chandler, 1994
- M. capnophila Shatalkin, 1985
- M. collarti Chandler, 2001
- M. fijiensis Sinclair & Chandler, 2007
- M. fumida Shatalkin, 1985
- M. ghesquierei Collart, 1936
- M. hebridensis Chandler, 1994
- M. imperfecta (Loew, 1866)
- M. lanka Chandler, 1994
- M. meridionalis Collart, 1960
- M. nigralula Chandler, 1994
- M. occidentalis Malloch, 1935
- M. pallipes (Meigen, 1830)
- M. pectipennis (Meigen, 1830)
- M. straeleni Collart, 1954
- M. tonnoiri Collart, 1934
- M. unicornuta Chandler, 1994
- M. vrydaghi Collart, 1954
