= Platypezina =

Scientific classification
- Domain: Eukaryota
- Kingdom: Animalia
- Phylum: Arthropoda
- Class: Insecta
- Order: Diptera
- Family: Platypezidae
- Genus: Platypezina; Wahlgren, 1910

Synonyms
- Coccothrinax Enderlein, 1927; Thrinacola Enderlein, 1927

Genus of flies

Platypezina is a genus of flat-footed flies in the family Platypezidae.

== Species ==
- Platypezina diversa (Johnson, 1923)
- Platypezina connexa (Boheman, 1858)
