= Bolopus =

Scientific classification
- Kingdom: Animalia
- Phylum: Arthropoda
- Clade: Pancrustacea
- Class: Insecta
- Order: Diptera
- Family: Platypezidae
- Genus: Bolopus; Enderlein, 1932
- Species: B. furcatus

Binomial name
- Bolopus furcatus (Fallén, 1815)

Synonyms
- Platypeza furcata Fallén, 1815; Platypeza rectinervis Wulp, 1868

Genus of flies

Bolopus is a genus of flat-footed flies (insects in the family Platypezidae). There is one described species, Bolopus furcatus.
