= Chydaeopeza =

Scientific classification
- Domain: Eukaryota
- Kingdom: Animalia
- Phylum: Arthropoda
- Class: Insecta
- Order: Diptera
- Family: Platypezidae
- Genus: Chydaeopeza; Shatalkin, 1992
- Species: C. tibialis

Binomial name
- Chydaeopeza tibialis Shatalkin, 1985

Synonyms
- Agathomyia tibialis Shatalkin, 1985

Genus of flies

Chydaeopeza is a genus of flat-footed flies (insects in the family Platypezidae). There is one described species, Chydaeopeza tibialis.
