= Polyporivora polypori =

Scientific classification
- Kingdom: Animalia
- Phylum: Arthropoda
- Class: Insecta
- Order: Diptera
- Family: Platypezidae
- Genus: Polyporivora
- Species: P. polypori

Binomial name
- Polyporivora polypori (Willard, 1914)

Synonyms
- Platypeza polypori Willard, 1914

Species of fly

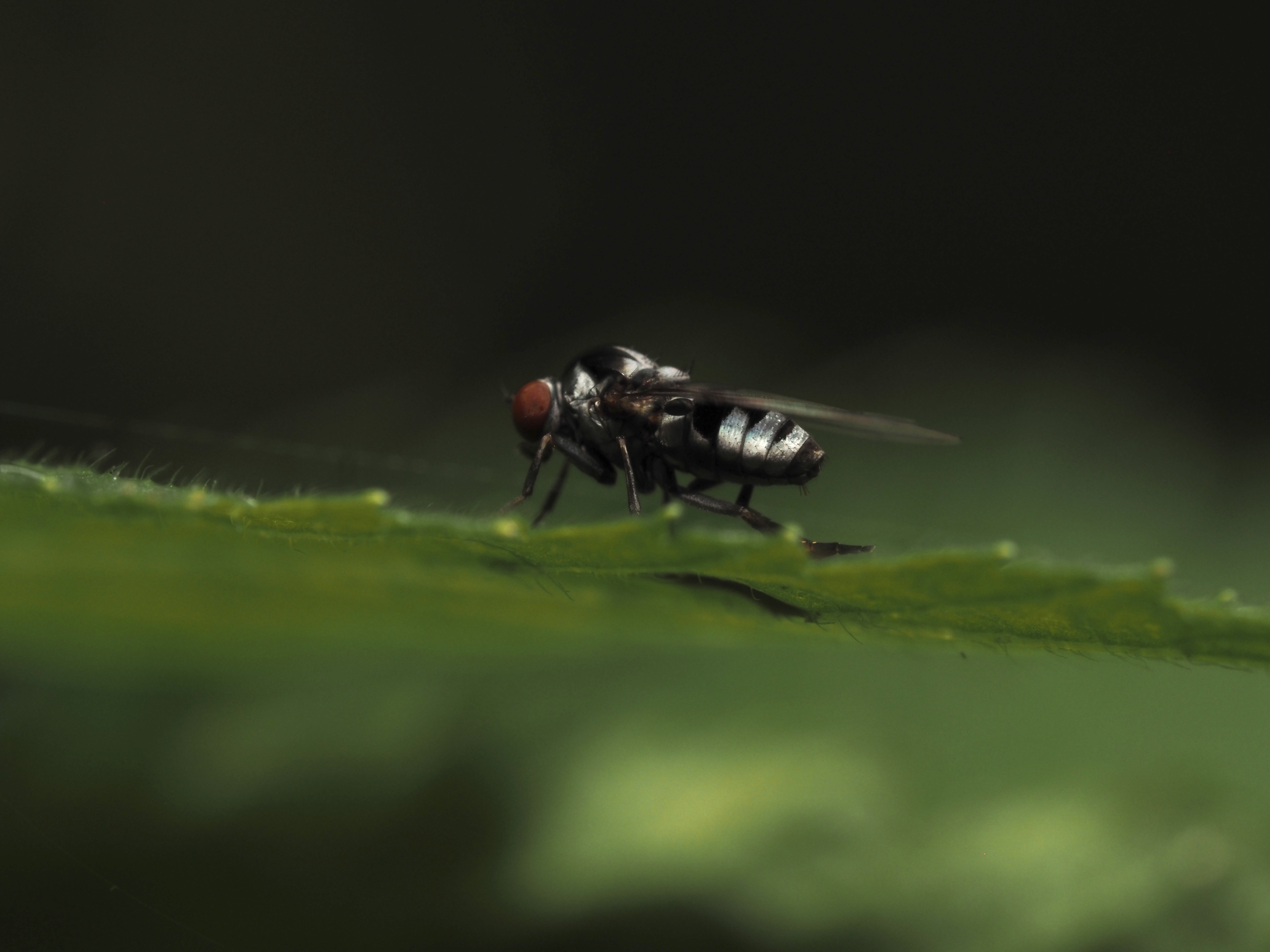
Polyporivora polypori, Goldstream Provincial Park, British Columbia.

Polyporivora polypori is a species of flat-footed flies (insects in the family Platypezidae).
