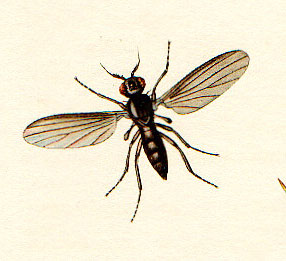
- Opetia nigra Meigen, 1830

Scientific classification
- Kingdom: Animalia
- Phylum: Arthropoda
- Clade: Pancrustacea
- Class: Insecta
- Order: Diptera
- Infraorder: Muscomorpha
- Section: Aschiza
- Superfamily: Platypezoidea
- Family: Opetiidae; Rondani, 1856

= Opetiidae =

Family of flies

The Opetiidae is a family of true flies of the superfamily Platypezoidea, one of two families commonly called flat-footed flies. The family contains only five extant species in two genera, Opetia from the Palearctic region and Puyehuemyia from Chile in South America. Several fossil genera have been assigned to the family, but many of these are likely to belong elsewhere in the Platypezoidea. Lonchopterites from the Early Cretaceous Lebanese amber and Electrosania from the Late Cretaceous New Jersey amber seem likely to be closely related to modern opetiids.

== Family description ==
wing venation

See

== Classification ==
Opetiidae was formerly in Platypezidae.

- †Lithopetia Zhang, 1987
  - †Lithopetia hirsuta Zhang, 1987
- Opetia Meigen, 1830 Palearctic, Oligocene-Recent
  - Opetia aberrans Shatalkin, 1985
  - Opetia alticola Saigusa, 1963
  - Opetia anomalipennis Saigusa, 1963
  - †Opetia atra Statz, 1940 Rott Formation, Germany, Oligocene
  - Opetia nigra Meigen, 1830
- †Opetiala Coram, Jarzembowski & Mostovski, 2000

- †Opetiala shatalkini Coram, Jarzembowski & Mostovski, 2000

- †Oppenheimiella Meunier, 1893

- †Oppenheimiella baltica Meunier, 1893

- †Pseudopetia Zhang, 1987

- †Pseudopetia exilis Zhang, 1987
- †Pseudopetia grandis Zhang, 1987

- Puyehuemyia Amorim et al, 2018 Chile, Recent

- Puyehuemyia chandleri Amorim et al, 2018

== Images ==
Diptera.info
