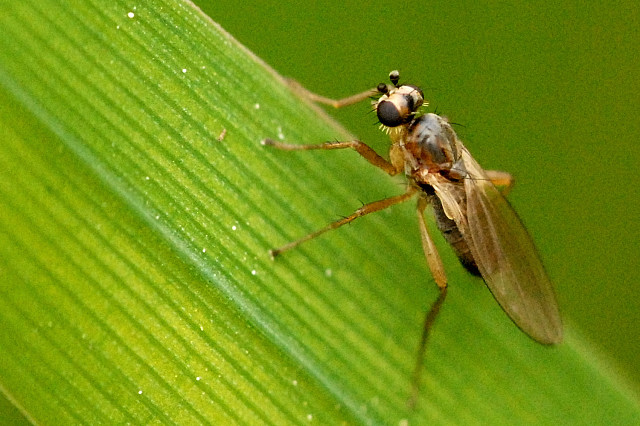
- Lonchoptera lutea

Scientific classification
- Kingdom: Animalia
- Phylum: Arthropoda
- Clade: Pancrustacea
- Class: Insecta
- Order: Diptera
- Superfamily: Phoroidea
- Family: Lonchopteridae; Macquart, 1823

Diversity
- 6 genera

Synonyms
- Lonchopteroidea; Musidoridae Kertész, 1909

= Lonchopteridae =

Family of flies

wing venation (male)

The Lonchopteridae (spear-winged flies or pointed-wing flies) are a family of small (2–5 mm), slender, yellow to brownish-black Diptera, occurring all over the world. Their common name refers to their pointed wings, which have a distinct venation. Many are parthenogenic; males are very rare, however, at least in North American species, and have a somewhat different venation than do the females.

Spear-winged flies are common in moist, shady, grassy areas, where the larvae are found within decaying vegetation. One species, Lonchoptera bifurcata, is cosmopolitan in distribution, and may have been transported via shipments of vegetables.

== Description ==
The Lonchopteridae are minute, slender flies with long wings which are pointed at the apex. The head is rounded, with the outer vertical bristles, inner vertical bristles, ocellar bristles, interfrontal bristles, and bristles along the margin of the broad mouth very well developed. The mesonotum and scutellum and legs have well-developed bristles. The radial vein R has three branches (R1, R2+3, R4+5). The median vein M is furcate (M1, M2). The anal vein A merges with the cubital vein Cu (female) or terminates freely (male).

== Systematics ==
They are usually placed in the superfamily of flat-footed flies and allies (Platypezoidea). If the Platypezoidea are restricted to the flat-footed flies sensu stricto, the spear-winged flies are united with the Ironomyiidae and the coffin and scuttle flies (Phoridae) as Phoroidea. More rarely, they are treated as monotypic superfamily Lonchopteroidea.

Four living genera are in this family, encompassing some 50 described species all together:

- Homolonchoptera Yang, 1998
- Lonchoptera Meigen, 1803
- Neolonchoptera Vaillant, 1989
- Spilolonchoptera Yang, 1998

Two fossil genera of spear-winged flies have been described:

- Lonchopterites Grimaldi & Cumming, 1999
- Lonchopteromorpha Grimaldi & Cumming, 1999

The Entomologist Andrew E. Whittington in 2024 suggested that all the living genera are synonyms with Lonchoptera

== Species ==
- West Palaearctic including Russia
- Australasian/Oceanian
- Nearctic
- Japan
- World list
