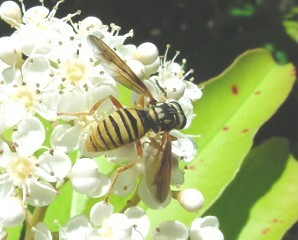
- Temnostoma sp. (Syrphidae)

Scientific classification
- Kingdom: Animalia
- Phylum: Arthropoda
- Class: Insecta
- Order: Diptera
- Suborder: Brachycera
- Infraorder: Muscomorpha
- Section: Aschiza

Superfamilies
- Platypezoidea; Syrphoidea

= Aschiza =

Group of insects

The Aschiza are a section of the Brachycera. Two large families, the Syrphidae and the Phoridae, and a number of smaller taxa are in this group. They are similar to most of the familiar Muscomorpha with one notable exception; they do not possess a ptilinum, so lack the prominent ptilinal suture on the face as in other muscoid flies. They do still have a puparium with a circular emergence opening, but it is not as precisely ellipsoid in shape as is typical for other muscoids. The term was first used by Eduard Becher .

Molecular phylogenetic studies find both Aschiza and the superfamily Syrphoidea to be paraphyletic, with the family Pipunculidae as sister group to the Schizophora.
