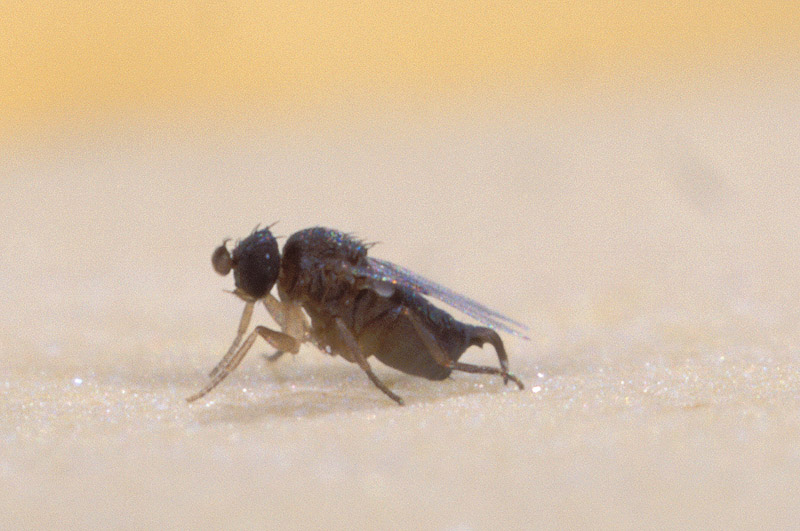
- Pseudacteon sp. (Phoridae)

Scientific classification
- Kingdom: Animalia
- Phylum: Arthropoda
- Class: Insecta
- Order: Diptera
- Section: Aschiza
- Superfamily: Platypezoidea

Families
- 5, see text

Synonyms
- Phoroidea

= Platypezoidea =

Superfamily of flies

The Platypezoidea are a superfamily of true flies of the section Aschiza. Their closest living relatives are the Syrphoidea, which, for example, contain the hoverflies. Like these, the adults do not burst open their pupal cases with a ptilinum when hatching, thus the Aschiza do not have the inverted-U-shaped suture above the antennae. They are, however, muscomorphs, thus have a particular type of pupal case resembling a rounded barrel and called puparium.

== Families ==
Five families are placed in the Platypezoidea, listed below in taxonomic sequence:

- Phoridae - coffin and scuttle flies (includes Sciadoceridae)
- Opetiidae - flat-footed flies
- Ironomyiidae - ironic flies
- Lonchopteridae - spear-winged flies, pointed-wing flies
- Platypezidae - flat-footed flies

The Ironomyiidae, Lonchopteridae, and Phoridae are sometimes separated as Phoroidea. The reduced Platypezoidea thus created unites the two families of flat-footed flies.
