= Edward L. Kessel =

American entomologist

Edward Luther Kessel
- Born: April 27, 1904; Osborne, Kansas
- Died: September 30, 1997 (aged 93); Milwaukie, Oregon, United States
- Education: University of California, Berkeley
- Known for: expertise in flat-footed flies
- Spouse: Berta B. Kessel (1911-1995)
- Awards: AAAS Fellow
- Scientific career
- Fields: Entomology
- Workplaces: University of San Francisco, California Academy of Sciences

Edward Luther Kessel (April 27, 1904 – September 30, 1997) was an American biologist known for his work as an entomologist and writings to reconcile science and religion.

== Early life and education ==
Kessel was born on 27 April 1904 in Osborne, Kansas to George Grant Kessel and Hattie Levon Kessel, but the family moved to South Africa in 1908, and later in 1916 to San Joaquin County, California where he grew up in the farming community of Ripon. The elder Kessel was a Free Methodist preacher, sparking Kessel's lifelong interest in the reconciliation of science and religion. Kessel began studies for the ministry at Greenville College in Illinois and Church Divinity School of the Pacific before finishing his B.S. degree in agriculture at the University of California, Berkeley in 1925. His M.A. (1927) and Ph.D. degrees (1936) were also earned at the University of California, Berkeley.

== Career ==
Kessel began his teaching career at Marquette University (1927-1932), but he spent most of his professional career in San Francisco as a faculty member at the University of San Francisco (1936-1974), and as curator of the entomological collections at the California Academy of Sciences (1945-1959). He served as the managing editor of the Wasmann Journal of Biology from 1950 to 1974, and during his 30-year association with the California Academy of Sciences, he was the editor of 370 technical papers and monographs published by the academy. Kessel is considered to be one of the leading authorities on the Platypezidae or flat-footed flies, with entomologists mailing specimens to him from around the globe. Kessel's collections, which are housed at the California Academy of Sciences, are the most comprehensive collection of this taxon in the world. Kessel died at his retirement home in Milwaukie, Oregon on 30 September 1997. The University of San Francisco annually bestows the Edward L. Kessel Award to an undergraduate student with high potential for a professional career in the biological sciences.

Kessel was a Fellow of the American Association for the Advancement of Science, and a Fellow of the California Academy of Sciences, and he served as president of the Pacific Coast Entomological Society.

== Selected publications ==
Edward L. Kessel was the author of about 100 scientific publications mostly on entomology, many of which were co-authored by his spouse Berta B. Kessel (10 Feb 1911 - 20 Jul 1995). However he also is known for a 1983 paper proposing parthenogenesis and phenotypic sex-reversal as a possible explanation for the virgin birth of Christ. Some of his publications included:

- Kessel E.L. and B.B. Kessel. 1939. Diptera associated with fungi. Wasmann Collector 3: 73–92.
- Kessel, E.L. and J.V. Karabinos. 1947. Empimorpha geneatis Melander, a balloon fly from California with a chemical examination of its balloons (Diptera; Empididae). Pan-Pacific Entomology 23:181-192.
- Kessel E.L. 1948. Australian sod fly introduced into California (Diptera: Stratiomyidae). Science 108(2813):607.
- Kessel, E.L. and B.B. Kessel. 1951. A new species of balloon-bearing Empis and an account of its mating activities (Diptera:Empididae). Wasmann Journal of Biology 9:137-146.
- Kessel, E. L. 1955. The mating activities of balloon flies. Systematic Zoology 4:97-104.
- Kessel E.L., Buegler M.E. and Keyes P.M. 1973. A survey of the known larvae and puparia of Platypezidae, with a key to ten genera based on the immature stages (Diptera). Wasmann Journal of Biology 31: 233–261.
- Kessel, E.L. 1983. A proposed biological interpretation of the Virgin birth. Journal of the American Scientific Affiliation 35:129-136. web version
