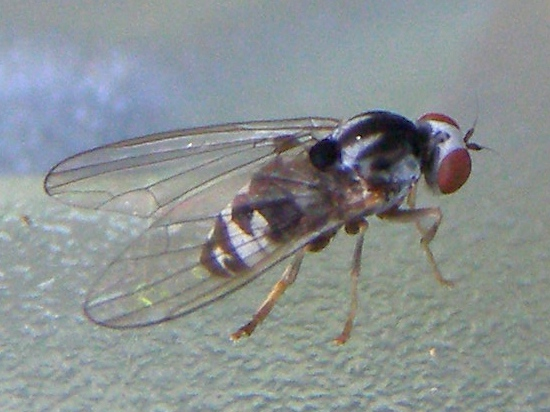
- Female Polyporivora picta

Scientific classification
- Kingdom: Animalia
- Phylum: Arthropoda
- Clade: Pancrustacea
- Class: Insecta
- Order: Diptera
- Superfamily: Platypezoidea
- Family: Platypezidae; Fallén, 1815

Genera
- Numerous, see text

Synonyms
- Clythiidae

= Platypezidae =

Family of flies

Agathomyia wankowiczii ovipositing on an Artist's Bracket fungus

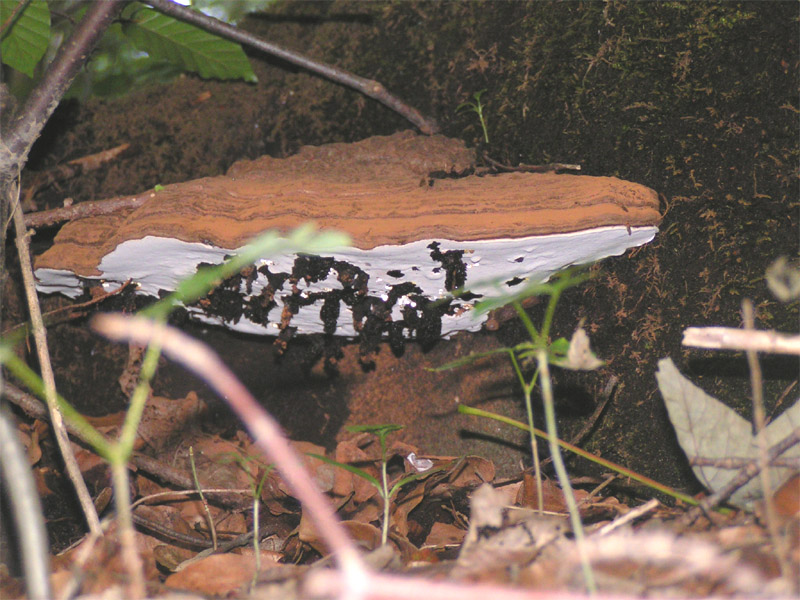
Larval galls (black objects) of Agathomyia wankowiczii on an Artist's Bracket fungus (Ganoderma applanatum)

Platypezidae is a family of true flies of the superfamily Platypezoidea. The more than 250 species are found worldwide primarily in woodland habitats. A common name is flat-footed flies, but this is also used for the closely related Opetiidae which were formerly included in the Platypezidae.

Some genera formerly included here have been recognized as entirely unrelated, and now placed in the asilomorph family Atelestidae.

Platypezidae wing veins Lindneromyia sp. group-species Symmetricella

== Description ==
For terms see Morphology of Diptera.

Platypezidae are minute to medium sized (1.5–6 mm) slender or robust flies. The male and female usually differ in colour. Males in particular are often all black, one or both sexes may be in part or all grey or yellow. Markings may be orange, grey or silver. The abdomen may have two colours. Males have holoptic eyes. The antenna has three segments, the third is the largest and bears a long, apical arista. The wing is clear or tinged (the area along the wing margin, around veins Sc and R1 is darkened in some genera). The wing has large anal lobe and the anal vein reaches the wing margin. The cell cup ends in an acute angle and is often elongate. Vein M is forked in most genera. The crossvein DM-Cu is present (absent in Microsania where crossvein R-M is also lacking). The legs are short and robust. The first tarsal segment is usually swollen in the male, slender in the female and the distal tarsal segments are cylindrical (the first tarsal segment of the hind leg is long and cylindrical in the subfamily Callomyiina). In the subfamily Platypezinae the first tarsal segment of the hind leg is short and laterally compressed, the distal are tarsal segments are also laterally compressed, in particular in the female.

The larva has a poorly differentiated, fairly unsclerotized head with short tuberclelike antennae located above rudimentary palpi and 11 body segments. It is amphipneustic (having only the anterior and posterior pairs of spiracle). The form is usually flattened, but in some species cylindrical. Most species have lateral marginal processes, typically with one pair on each body segment, except for segments 2 and 11, which have more. Smaller dorsal processes are present on segments 3–10. Segments 3–10 often bear bristles, but bristles are not present on segments 1,2, and 11. The spiracles are located on the ends of wrinkled tube-like spiracular processes, the anterior pair (prothoracic spiracle) are on segment 1 the posterior ones are on segment 11 (anal segment) .

== Biology ==
Members of the Platypezidae inhabit damp woodlands. Larvae are fungivores. Adult males form aerial swarms before mating using trees or bushes as swarm markers. Some species of Microsania Zetterstedt are attracted to wood smoke and wood ash. Adults may be found performing rapid erratic movements on broad leaves of both woody and herbaceous plants, evidently feeding on surface deposits.

Platypeza hirticeps on Impatiens

Adults are seen either on the wing or running about in an erratic fashion on the leaves of bushes in partially sunlit, dappled shade. They hover in swarms of dancing males in forest openings. The females are attracted to chosen males in such swarms, where aerial coupling begins and the paired flies settle with heads in opposite directions on low bushes until mating is over. Feeding platypezids move rapidly over leaves, occasionally stopping to ingest honeydew or other food. The first feeding episode begins at midmorning, ceases at a time later in the morning then resumes in the afternoon. These times corresponds to the times of the day when insectivorous birds are least likely to feed. The mid day rest is when the sun is at a specific angle (peculiar to each species) and the afternoon feeding episode begins when the sun sinks to the angle that initiated the rest in the morning.

== Selected genera ==
- Agathomyia Verrall, 1901
- Bertamyia Kessel, 1970
- Bolopus Enderlein, 1932
- Callomyia Meigen, 1804
- Calotarsa Townsend, 1894
- Chydaeopeza Shatalkin, 1992
- Grossoseta Kessel & Kirby, 1968
- Lindneromyia Kessel, 1965
- Melanderomyia Kessel, 1960
- Metaclythia Kessel, 1952
- Microsania Zetterstedt, 1837
- Pamelamyia Kessel & Clopton, 1970
- Paraplatypeza Kessel & Maggioncalda, 1968
- Platypeza Meigen, 1803
- Platypezina Wahlgren, 1910
- Polyporivora Kessel & Maggioncalda, 1968
- Protoclythia Kessel, 1950
- Seri Kessel & Kessel, 1966

=== Extinct genera ===
- †Burmapeza Grimaldi 2018 Burmese amber, Myanmar, Cenomanian
- †Calvopeza Grimaldi 2018 Burmese amber, Myanmar, Cenomanian
- †Canadopeza Grimaldi 2018 Canadian amber, Foremost Formation, Canada, Campanian
- †Chandleromyia Grimaldi 2018 Burmese amber, Myanmar, Cenomanian
- †Electrosania Grimaldi & Cumming, 1999 New Jersey amber, Turonian
- †Eucallimyia Cockerell, 1911 Florissant Formation, Colorado, Eocene
- †Lebambromyia Grimaldi and Cumming 1999 Lebanese amber, Barremian Burmese amber, Myanmar, Cenomanian (altetnatively considered indeterminate within Platypezoidea)
- †Lebanopeza Grimaldi 2018 Lebanese amber, Barremian
- †Maritulus Mostovski, 1995 Zaza Formation, Russia, Aptian
- †Mesopetia Zhang, 1987
- †Oloplatypeza Mostovski, 1995 Ola Formation, Russia, Campanian
- †Palaeopetia Zhang, 1987
- †Parnasos Mostovski, 1995
- †Promittor Mostovski, 1995
- †Proplatypeza Mostovski, 1995 Dzun-Bain Formation, Mongolia, Aptian, Zaza Formation, Russia, Aptian

== Species Lists ==
- West Palaearctic including Russia
- Australasian/Oceanian
- Nearctic
- Japan
- World list
