= Hymenoptera paleobiota of Burmese amber =

Burmese amber is fossil resin dating to the early Late Cretaceous Cenomanian age recovered from deposits in the Hukawng Valley of northern Myanmar. It is known for being one of the most diverse Cretaceous age amber paleobiotas, containing rich arthropod fossils, along with uncommon vertebrate fossils and even rare marine inclusions. A mostly complete list of all taxa described up to the end of 2023 can be found in Ross (2024).

== Hymenoptera ==
Taxon	Authority	Year described	Notes	image
Abropelecinus rasnitsyni	Wang et al.	2023	A pelecinid wasp.	
Abropelecinus rectus	Wang et al.	2023	A pelecinid wasp.	
Abropelecinus tytthus	Guo et al.	2016	A pelecinid wasp.	
Acanthabythus exilispineus	Lepeco & Melo	2022	A scolebythid wasp.	
Alivespa colossa	Wu et al.	2020	A priorvespine vespid wasp.	
Alivespa gracilenta	Wu et al.	2021	A priorvespine vespid wasp.	
Alivespa hirta	Wu et al.	2020	A priorvespine vespid wasp.	
Allommation elongatum	Rosa & Melo	2021	An allommationid apoid wasp.	
Allommation grande	Rosa & Melo	2021	An allommationid apoid wasp.	
Allommation procerum	Rosa & Melo	2021	An allommationid apoid wasp.	
Allopelecinus ruoyae	Wang et al.	2023	A pelecinid wasp.	
Ammosphecium diabolicum	Rosa & Melo	2021	A crabronine wasp.	
Ampluspelecinus robustus	Uchida	2023	A pelecinid wasp.	
Ampulicomorpha janzeni	Olmi et al.	2014	An embolemid wasp.	
Angarosphex alethes	Rosa & Melo	2023	An angarosphecid wasp.	
Antiquiformica alata	Wu, Radchenko & Engel in Wu et al.	2024	A formicine ant.	
Apodolichurus diaphanus	Antropov	2000	A digger wasp.	
Apodolichurus sphaerocephalus	Antropov	2000	A digger wasp.	
Aptenoperissus amabilis	Zhang & Rasnitsyn	2017	An Aptenoperissidae wasp	
Aptenoperissus burmanicus	Rasnitsyn & Poinar	2016	An Aptenoperissidae wasp	
Aptenoperissus delicatus	Zhang & Rasnitsyn	2017	An Aptenoperissidae wasp	
Aptenoperissus etius	Rasnitsyn & Öhm-Kühnle	2018	An Aptenoperissidae wasp	
Aptenoperissus formosus	Zhang & Rasnitsyn	2017	An Aptenoperissidae wasp	
Aptenoperissus magnifemoris	Rasnitsyn & Öhm-Kühnle	2018	An Aptenoperissidae wasp	
Aptenoperissus pusillus	Rasnitsyn & Öhm-Kühnle	2018	An Aptenoperissidae wasp	
Aptenoperissus zonalis	Zhang & Rasnitsyn	2018	An Aptenoperissidae wasp	
Aquilomyrmex huangi	Perrichot, Wang & Barden	2020	A haidomyrmecine ant	
Arcapenesia compacta	Lepeco & Melo	2022	A scolebythid wasp.	
Archaeoserphites engeli	Rasnitsyn & Öhm-Kühnle	2020	An archaeoserphitid wasp.	
Archaeovespa cretacea	Wu et al.	2020	A vespid wasp.	
Archaeovespa engeli	Wu et al.	2020	A vespid wasp.	
Archaeovespa incompleta	Wu et al.	2021	A vespid wasp.	
Archaeovespa malleata	Wu et al.	2020	A vespid wasp.	
Archaeromma gibsoni	Engel & Grimaldi	2007	A false fairy wasp.	
Archeofoenus engeli	Turrisi & Ellenberger	2019	A hyptiogastritine aulacid wasp.	
Archeofoenus tartaricus	Engel	2017	A hyptiogastritine aulacid wasp.	
Archeogastrinus kachinensis	Jouault & Rosse-Guillevic	2023	A praeaulacid wasp.	
Archaeorhyssalus subsolanus	Engel in Engel & Wang	2016	A Protorhyssalinae braconid wasp.	
Archaeoteleia astropulvis	Talamas in Talamas et al.	2016	A platygastroid wasp of uncertain placement.	
Argemiones stupeflip	Brazidec	2023	A spathiopterygid wasp.	
Aulacicosmus setosus	Rosa & Melo	2021	A heterogynaid wasp.	
Aureobythus decoloratus	Melo & Lucena	2019	A chrysobythid chrysidoid wasp	
Aureobythus punctatus	Melo & Lucena	2019	A chrysobythid chrysidoid wasp	
Aureobythus villosus	Melo & Lucena	2019	A chrysobythid chrysidoid wasp	
Auricleptes nebulosus	Lucena & Melo	2018	A cuckoo wasp..	
Azanichrum pilosum	Lucena & Melo	2018	A cuckoo wasp.	
Azygdellitha nova	Yang et al.	2024	A praeaulacid wasp.	
Baeomorpha liorum	Huber, Shih & Ren	2019	A rotoitid wasp.	
Bethylitella cylindrella	Cockerell	1917	A Bethylidae wasp	
Bethylochrysis clypeata	Melo & Lucena	2019	A chrysobythid chrysidoid wasp.	
Bohartiura glabrata	Lucena & Melo	2018	A cuckoo wasp.	
Brachypelecinus euthyntus	Guo et al.	2016	A pelecinid wasp.	
Bryopompilus interfector	Engle & Grimaldi	2006	A bryopompilid wasp.	
Burmabracon gracilens	Li et al.	2021	A protorhyssaline braconid wasp.	
Burmabracon grossus	Li et al.	2021	A protorhyssaline braconid wasp.	
Burmadryinus cenomanianus	Olmi, Xu & Guglielmino	2014	A dryinid wasp.	
Burmaevania aequalis	Shih et al.	2020	An evaniid wasp.	
Burmaevania brevis	Shih et al.	2020	An evaniid wasp.	
Burmaimetsha concava	Perrichot	2013	A maimetshid wasp.	
Burmanteon olmii	Engel	2003	An anteonine dryinid wasp	
Burmapenesia iridescens	Lepeco & Melo	2022	A scolebythid wasp.	
Burmapenesia longicephala	Lepeco & Melo	2022	A scolebythid wasp.	
Burmaphron prolatum	Engel & Grimaldi	2009	A stigmaphronid wasp	
Burmaphron tridentatum	Engel & Grimaldi	2009	A stigmaphronid wasp	
Burmapyris azevedoi	Li et al.	2021	A lancepyrine bethylid wasp.	
Burmapyris ohmkuhnlei	Brazidec, Legendre & Perrichot	2023	A lancepyrine bethylid wasp.	
Burmasclerogibba aptera	Perkovsky et al.	2020	A member of the family Sclerogibbidae.	
Burmasega ammirabilis	Lucena & Melo	2018	A cuckoo wasp.	
Burmasphex mirabilis	Rosa & Melo	2023	A burmasphecid apoid wasp.	
Burmasphex pilosus	Melo & Rosa	2018	A burmasphecid apoid wasp.	
Burmasphex sulcatus	Melo & Rosa	2018	A burmasphecid apoid wasp.	
Burmastatus triangularis	Antropov	2000	A Crabronid wasp	
Burmatiphia mandibulata	Zheng et al.	2022	A tiphiid wasp.	
Burminata caputaeria	Haas, Burks & Krogmann	2018	A diversinitid chalcid wasp.	
Burmomyrma rossi	Dlussky	1996	A Falsiformicid wasp, originally placed in Formicidae	
Burmorussus mirabilis	Zhang et al.	2020	A parasitic wasp belonging to the family Burmorussidae.	
Burmoxyela lii	Zheng et al.	2021	A syspastoxyelid sawfly.	
Burmusculus abstrusus	Wu et al.	2024	A burmusculid wasp.	
Burmusculus angustus	Li et al.	2021	A burmusculid wasp.	
Burmusculus flexus	Li et al.	2023	A burmusculid wasp.	
Burmusculus fuxii	Zhang & Rasnitsyn in Zhang, Rasnitsyn & Zhang	2018	A burmusculid wasp.	
Burmusculus magnus	Li et al.	2020	A burmusculid wasp.	
Burmusculus mutatus	Li et al.	2023	A burmusculid wasp.	
Burmusculus nuwae	Zhang & Rasnitsyn in Zhang, Rasnitsyn & Zhang	2018	A burmusculid wasp.	
Burmusculus primitivus	Wu et al.	2024	A burmusculid wasp.	
Burmusculus shennongii	Zhang & Rasnitsyn in Zhang, Rasnitsyn & Zhang	2018	A burmusculid wasp.	
Buserphites applanatus	Herbert & McKellar	2021	A serphitid wasp.	
Buserphites myanmarensis	Herbert & McKellar	2021	A serphitid wasp.	
Callisphex robustus	Rosa & Melo	2023	A burmasphecid apoid wasp.	
Caloichneumon perrarus	Li et al.	2017	An ichneumon wasp.	
Camelomecia janovitzi	Barden & Grimaldi	2016	A stem group ant of uncertain affinity	
Camelosphecia fossor	Boudinot, Perrichot & Chaul	2020	A member of Formicoidea closely related to ants.	
Camelosphecia venator	Boudinot, Perrichot & Chaul	2020	A member of Formicoidea closely related to ants.	
Caradiophyodus saradae	Poinar & Vega	2023	An caradiophyodid platygastroid.	
Cascoscelio incassa	Poinar	2012	A platygastrid wasp	
Cephalobythus clypeatus	Lepeco & Melo	2022	A scolebythid wasp.	
Cephalobythus deformis	Lepeco & Melo	2022	A scolebythid wasp.	
Cephalobythus gladiator	Lepeco & Melo	2022	A scolebythid wasp.	
Cephalobythus simplex	Lepeco & Melo	2022	A scolebythid wasp.	
Ceratomyrmex ellenbergeri	Perrichot, Bo, & Engel,	2016	A haidomyrmecine ant	
Ceratomyrmex planus	Lattke & Melo	2020	A haidomyrmecine ant	
Chainochora syntoma	Chen, van Achterberg & Hong	2021	A protobraconine braconid wasp.	
Chonidris insolita	Perrichot, Wang & Barden	2020	A haidomyrmecine ant	
Christophus myanmarensis	Brazidec et al.	2021	A diapriid wasp.	
Christophus ohmkuhnlei	Brazidec et al.	2021	A diapriid wasp.	
Chrysobythus areolatus	Melo & Lucena	2019	A chrysobythid chrysidoid wasp.	
Chrysopsenella euryphaessa	Lepeco & Melo	2023	A chrysopsenellid chrysidoid wasp.	
Cirrosphex admirabilis	Antropov	2000	A wasp of uncertain placement.	
Colmepsiterona cumcarena	Cockx & McKellar	2018	A Pemphredoninae crabronid wasp.	
Cresogmus grimaldii	Rasnitsyn & Kolyada in Rasnitsyn et al.	2022	A member of the family Proctotrupidae.	
Cretampulex gracilis	Antropov	2000	A digger wasp.	
Cretapristocera longiscapa	Jouault et al.	2020	A bethylid wasp.	
Cretastatus longevus	Rosa & Melo	2021	An astatine wasp.	
Cretevania bechlyi	Jennings, Krogmann & Mew	2013	An evaniid wasp.	
Cretevania kachinensis	Rosse-Guillevic & Jouault	2023	An evaniid wasp.	
Cretevania tenuis	Li et al.	2018	An ensign wasp.	
Cretolixon alatum	Lohrmann in Lohrmann et al.	2020	A rhopalosomatid wasp.	
Cretolyra noijebumensis	Brazidec et al.	2024	A megalyrid wasp.	
Cretolyra shawi	Brazidec et al.	2024	A megalyrid wasp.	
Cretopsenella spinifera	Lepeco & Melo	2022	A scolebythid wasp.	
Cretorussus vilhelmseni	Jouault, Perrichot & Nel	2021	An orussoid sawfly.	
Cretosapyga resinicola	Bennett & Engel	2005	A sapygid wasp	
Cretosclerogibba antennalis	Perkovsky et al.	2020	A member of the family Sclerogibbidae.	
Cretosclerogibba contractocollis	Perkovsky et al.	2020	A member of the family Sclerogibbidae.	
Cretosclerogibba neli	Perkovsky et al.	2020	A member of the family Sclerogibbidae.	
Cretosclerogibba rasnitsyni	Perkovsky et al.	2020	A member of the family Sclerogibbidae.	
Cretospilomena familiaris	Antropov	2000	A Crabronid wasp	
Cretovelona orussopteryx	Vilhelmsen, Nakamine & Yamamoto in Vilhelmsen et al.	2025	A sawfly belonging to the group Orussoidea.	
Curiosivespa striata	Perrard & Carpenter	2017	A vespid wasp.	
Curiosivespa zigrasi	Perrard & Carpenter	2017	A vespid wasp.	
Cursoribythus silvestris	Cockx & McKellar	2016	A falsiformicid wasp.	
Curtevania enervia	Li et al.	2018	An evanioid wasp.	
Curvitexis kopylovi	Jouault, Nam & Rasnitsyn	2022	A member of the family Anaxyelidae.	
Decasphex cretacicus	Zheng et al.	2020	A burmasphecid apoid wasp.	
Deltoxyela engeli	Wang et al.	2019	A syspastoxyelid sawfly.	
Dhagnathos autokrator	Perrichot, Wang & Barden	2020	A haidomyrmecine ant.	
Diaspathion ortegai	Engel & Huang	2015	A spathiopterygid diaprioid wasp.	
Dilobops bidentata	Lattke & Melo	2020	A haidomyrmecine ant	
Dipteromma paradoxa	Rasnitsyn et al.	2019	A dipterommatid mymarommatoid wasp.	
Discoscapa apicula	Poinar	2020	A crabronid wasp.	
Diversinitus attenboroughi	Haas, Burks, & Krogmann	2018	A diversinitid wasp	
Dryinus acutifrons	Martynova et al.	2020	A dryinid wasp.	
Dryinus arakanesis	Martynova et al.	2020	A dryinid wasp.	
Dryinus bamar	Martynova et al.	2020	A dryinid wasp.	
Dryinus brachytarsis	Martynova et al.	2020	A dryinid wasp.	
Dryinus burmensis	Martynova et al.	2020	A dryinid wasp.	
Dryinus carsteni	Olmi et al.	2022	A dryinid wasp.	
Dryinus chin	Martynova et al.	2020	A dryinid wasp.	
Dryinus katyae	Martynova et al.	2020	A dryinid wasp.	
Dryinus laminatus	Martynova et al.	2020	A dryinid wasp.	
Dryinus latitarsis	Martynova et al.	2020	A dryinid wasp.	
Dryinus maderai	Guglielmino et al.	2018	A dryinid wasp.	
Dryinus nadezhdae	Martynova et al.	2020	A dryinid wasp.	
Dryinus parisei	Martynova et al.	2020	A dryinid wasp.	
Dryinus taron	Martynova et al.	2020	A dryinid wasp.	
Edrossia vetusta	Perkovsky et al.	2020	A member of the family Sclerogibbidae.	
Electrofoenia jehani	Jouault, Nel & Perrichot	2020	An aulacid wasp.	
Electrofoenops diminuta	Engel	2017	An aulacid wasp.	
Electrofoenops cockerelli	Turrisi & Ellenberger	2019	An aulacid wasp.	
Electrofoenops exaltatus	Li et al.	2021	An aulacid wasp.	
Electrofoenops rasnitsyni	Turrisi & Ellenberger	2019	An Aulacid wasp.	
Electrofoenus gracilipes	Cockerell	1917	An Aulacidae wasp	
Embolemus antiquus	Perkovsky et al.	2020	An embolemid wasp.	
Embolemus brachypterus	Olmi et al.	2021	An embolemid wasp.	
Embolemus burmensis	Perkovsky et al.	2020	An embolemid wasp.	
Embolemus cretacicus	Perkovsky et al.	2020	An embolemid wasp.	
Embolemus micropterus	Olmi et al.	2021	An embolemid wasp.	
Embolemus ohmkuhnlei	Perkovsky et al.	2020	An embolemid wasp.	
Embolemus zherikhini	Perkovsky et al.	2020	An embolemid wasp.	
Eopelecinus inopinatus	Jouault et al.	2020	A pelecinid wasp.	
Eopelecinus marechali	Jouault	2021	A pelecinid wasp.	
Eopelecinus strangulatus	Wang et al.	2023	A pelecinid wasp.	
Eorhopalosoma gorgyra	Engel	2008	A rhopalosomatid wasp.	
Eorhopalosoma lohrmanni	Boudinot & Dungey	2020	A rhopalosomatid wasp.	
Exilaulacus advenus	Li et al.	2021		
Exilaulacus eximius	Li et al.	2021		
Exilaulacus loculatus	Li et al.	2018	An evanioid wasp.	
Exilaulacus latus	Li et al.	2018	An evanioid wasp.	
Falsiformix pedestris	Zhang & Rasnitsyn in Zhang et al.	2024	A member of Vespoidea belonging to the family Falsiformicidae.	
Foenobethylus electriphilus	(Cockerell)	1917	A bethylid wasp. Originally described as "Apenesia" electriphila. Moved from "Eleganesia" electriphila.	
Galloromma kachinensis	Engel & Grimaldi	2007	A false fairy wasp.	
Genkyhag innebula	Brazidec et al.	2024	A megalyrid wasp.	
Geoscelio mckellari	Engel & Huang	2016	A scelionid wasp.	
Gerontoformica contegus	(Barden & Grimaldi)	2014	A sphecomyrmine ant	
Gerontoformica gracilis	(Barden & Grimaldi)	2014	A sphecomyrmine ant	
Gerontoformica magnus	(Barden & Grimaldi)	2014	A sphecomyrmine ant	
Gerontoformica orientalis	(Engel & Grimaldi)	2005	A sphecomyrmine ant	
Gerontoformica pilosus	(Barden & Grimaldi)	2014	A sphecomyrmine ant	
Gerontoformica robustus	(Barden & Grimaldi)	2014	A sphecomyrmine ant	
Gerontoformica rugosus	(Barden & Grimaldi)	2014	A sphecomyrmine ant	
Gerontoformica spiralis	(Barden & Grimaldi)	2014	A sphecomyrmine ant	
Gerontoformica sternorhabda	Boudinot et al.	2022	A sphecomyrmine ant	
Gerontoformica subcuspis	(Barden & Grimaldi)	2014	A sphecomyrmine ant	
Gerontoformica tendir	(Barden & Grimaldi)	2014	A sphecomyrmine ant	
Glabiala barbata	Haas, Burks & Krogmann	2018	A diversinitid chalcid wasp.	
Glenocephalus mandibularis	Rosa & Melo	2021	A cirrosphecid apoid wasp.	
Gnathapenesia burmensis	Lepeco & Melo	2022	A scolebythid wasp.	
Grandixyela rasnitsyni	Zheng in Zheng et al.	2021	A syspastoxyelid sawfly.	
Gwesped groehni	Brazidec, Legendre & Perrichot	2023	A lancepyrine bethylid wasp.	
Habraulacus splendidus	Jouault & Huang	2024	A praeaulacid evanioid wasp.	
Habraulacus zhaoi	Li et al.	2015	A praeaulacid evanioid wasp.	
Hadraulacus liae	Jouault & Huang	2024	A praeaulacid wasp.	
Hadraulacus perrarus	Li, Shih & Ren in Li et al.	2023	A praeaulacid wasp.	
Haidomyrmex cerberus	Dlussky	1996	A haidomyrmecine ant	
Haidomyrmex davidbowiei	Lattke & Melo	2020	A haidomyrmecine ant	
Haidomyrmex scimitarus	Barden & Grimaldi	2012	A haidomyrmecine ant	
Haidomyrmex zigrasi	Barden & Grimaldi	2012	A haidomyrmecine ant	
Haptodioctes apiformis	Rosa & Melo	2021	A cirrosphecid apoid wasp.	
Helosericus verrucosus	Rosa & Melo	2021	A member of the tribe Psenini.	
Heteroichneumon rasnitsyni	Kopylov, Zhang & Zhang	2021	An ichneumon wasp.	
Heteropimpla megista	Li, Shih, Kopylov & Ren in Li et al.	2019	A Labenopimplinae ichneumon wasp.	
Heteropimpla pulverulenta	Kopylov, Zhang & Zhang	2021		
Heterosphex wuni	Li, Rosa, Melo & Shih in Li et al.	2022	A cirrosphecid apoid wasp.	
Holopsenella antiqua	Lepeco & Melo	2021	A member of Aculeata of uncertain phylogenetic placement.	
Holopsenella burmitica	Lepeco & Melo	2021	A member of Aculeata of uncertain phylogenetic placement.	
Holopsenella gothica	Lepeco & Melo	2021	A member of Aculeata of uncertain phylogenetic placement.	
Holopsenelliscus pankowskiorum	Engel	2019	A bethylid wasp.	
Hukawngepyris setosus	Brazidec, Lohrmann & Perrichot	2024	An epyrine bethylid wasp.	
Hybristodryinus anomalus	Perkovsky et al.	2019	A dryinid wasp.	
Hybristodryinus castaneus	Olmi, Guglielmino & Chen in Olmi et al.	2021	A dryinid wasp.	
Hybristodryinus concavifrons	Perkovsky et al.	2019	A dryinid wasp.	
Hybristodryinus cretacicus	Perkovsky et al.	2019	A dryinid wasp.	
Hybristodryinus karen	Perkovsky et al.	2019	A dryinid wasp.	
Hybristodryinus kayin	Perkovsky et al.	2019	A dryinid wasp.	
Hybristodryinus konbaung	Perkovsky et al.	2019	A dryinid wasp.	
Hybristodryinus ligulatus	Perkovsky et al.	2019	A dryinid wasp.	
Hybristodryinus magnificus	Perkovsky et al.	2019	A dryinid wasp.	
Hybristodryinus mon	Perkovsky et al.	2019	A dryinid wasp.	
Hybristodryinus moutesoe	Tribull, Barden & Olmi	2020	A dryinid wasp.	
Hybristodryinus nalae	Perkovsky et al.	2019	A dryinid wasp.	
Hybristodryinus pyu	Perkovsky et al.	2019	A dryinid wasp.	
Hybristodryinus resinicolus	Engel	2005	A dryinid wasp	
Hybristodryinus shan	Perkovsky et al.	2019	A dryinid wasp.	
Hybristodryinus viriosus	Wang et al.	2021	A dryinid wasp.	
Hybristodryinus zaifui	Chen, Olmi & Perkovsky in Olmi et al.	2021	A dryinid wasp.	
Hypselogastrion simplex	Engel in Engel & Wang	2016	A gasteruptiid wasp.	
Hyptiogastrites electrinus	Cockerell	1917	An aulacid wasp	
Iberoevania nova	Li, Shih & Ren in Li et al.	2023	An evaniid wasp.	
Keratodellitha anubis	Jouault et al.	2021	A othniodellithid evanioid wasp.	
Keratodellitha basilisci	Jouault et al.	2021	A othniodellithid evanioid wasp.	
Keratodellitha kirin	Jouault et al.	2021	A othniodellithid evanioid wasp.	
Kleistochora dolichura	Chen, van Achterberg & Hong	2021	A protobraconine braconid wasp.	
Kronostephanus zigrasi	Engel & Grimaldi	2013	A schlettereriine crown wasp.	
Lagenostephanus lii	Li, Rasnitsyn, Shih & Ren	2017	A crown wasp.	
Linguamyrmex brevicornis	Perrichot et al.	2020	A haidomyrmecine ant	
Linguamyrmex rhinocerus	Miao & Wang	2019	A haidomyrmecine ant	
Linguamyrmex vladi	Barden & Grimaldi	2017	A haidomyrmecine ant	
Maimetshasia kachinensis	Perrichot	2013	A maimetshid wasp.	
Megacoxa chandrahrasa	Brazidec et al.	2024	A megalyrid wasp.	
Megacoxa janzeni	Brazidec et al.	2024	A megalyrid wasp.	
Megacoxa synchrotron	Brazidec et al.	2024	A megalyrid wasp.	
Megalopsenella pouilloni	Jouault et al.	2020	A bethylid wasp.	
Megalyrhyssalus clavicornis	Belokobylskij & Jouault	2021	A braconid wasp.	
Megarolium paradoxum	Rosa & Melo	2021	A bembicine wasp.	
Melittosphex burmensis	Poinar & Danforth	2006	An aculeate wasp	
Mendampulex monilicularis	Antropov	2000	A digger wasp.	
Merascylla atavella	(Cockerell)	1920	A bethylid wasp. Originally described as Epyris atavellus.	
Mesevania swinhoei	Basibuyuk & Rasnitsyn	2000	An ensign wasp	
Mesoserphites annulus	Herbert & McKellar	2021	A serphitid wasp.	
Mesoserphites engeli	Herbert & McKellar	2021	A serphitid wasp.	
Mesoserphites giganteus	Herbert & McKellar	2021	A serphitid wasp.	
Mesoserphites scutatus	Herbert & McKellar	2021	A serphitid wasp.	
Mesoserphites viraneacapitis	Herbert & McKellar	2021	A serphitid wasp.	
Mintara parva	Brazidec et al.	2021	A diapriid wasp.	
Miracorium tetrafoveolatum	Lucena & Melo	2018	A cuckoo wasp.	
Myanmarina diversa	Zheng et al.	2022	A myanmarinid wasp.	
Myanmarina jeannineae	Li et al.	2018	A myanmarinid wasp.	
Myanmarina kachin	Zhang & Rasnitsyn in Zhang et al.	2018	A myanmarinid wasp.	
Myanmarina lahu	Zhang & Rasnitsyn in Zhang et al.	2018	A myanmarinid wasp.	
Myanmarina lisu	Zhang & Rasnitsyn in Zhang et al.	2018	A myanmarinid wasp.	
Myanmarina sidorchukae	Jouault, Rasnitsyn & Perrichot	2020	A myanmarinid wasp.	
Myanmephialtites bashkuevi	Jouault, Rasnitsyn & Perrichot	2020	An ohlhoffiid stephanoid wasp.	
Myanmymar aresconoides	Huber	2011	A fairyfly	
Myanmyrma gracilis	Engel & Grimaldi	2005	A sphecomyrmine ant.	
Myanmyrma maraudera	Barden & Grimaldi	2016	A sphecomyrmine ant. Originally described as Gerontoformica maraudera.	
Nadezhdabythus burmensis	Zhang et al.	2020	A scolebythid wasp.	
Newjersevania brevis	Li et al.	2018	An evaniid wasp.	
Newjersevania longa	Li et al.	2018	An evaniid wasp.	
Newjersevania rasnitsyni	Shih et al.	2020	An evaniid wasp.	
Novichneumon longus	Li et al.	2017	An Ichneumon wasp.	
Odontosericus burmensis	Rosa & Melo	2021	A member of the tribe Psenini.	
Ohlhoffia robusta	Jouault, Rasnitsyn & Perrichot	2020	An ohlhoffiid stephanoid wasp.	
Orthosyntexis elegans	Gao, Engel, Shih, Gao in Gao et al.	2021	An anaxyelid wasp.	
Orthosyntexis thanti	Gao, Engel, Shih, Gao in Gao et al.	2021	An anaxyelid wasp.	
Othniodellitha mantichora	Engel & Huang in Engel et al.	2016	An Evanioid wasp.	
Palaeoanteon cenomanianum	Perkovsky et al.	2020	A dryinid wasp.	
Paleoaulacus minutus	Jouault & Nel	2021	An aulacid wasp.	
Paleosyncrasis hongi	Poinar	2019	A praeaulacid evanioid wasp.	
Pangu antiquum	Li et al.	2020	A panguid wasp.	
Pangu yuangu	Li et al.	2020	A panguid wasp.	
Paraxiphydria resinata	Gao, Engel & Gao in Gao et al.	2022	A member of the family Xiphydriidae or Anaxyelidae.	
Peleproctus dolichurus	Zhang et al.	2018	A peleserphid proctotrupomorph.	
Peleserphus brachyurus	Zhang et al.	2018	A peleserphid proctotrupomorph.	
Peleserphus genalis	Zhang et al.	2018	A peleserphid proctotrupomorph.	
Peleserphus qufuensis	Yu et al.	2021	A peleserphid proctotrupomorph.	
Pinguixyela pinguis	(Wang et al.)	2019	A syspastoxyelid sawfly. Originally described as Syspastoxyela pinguis.	
Plumalexius ohmkuhnlei	Rasnitsyn & Brothers	2020	A species of Plumalexius.	
Ponomarenkoa burmensis	Perkovsky et al.	2020	A dryinid wasp or an embolemid wasp.	
Ponomarenkoa ellenbergeri	Olmi, Xu & He	2013	A Ponomarenkoinae Dryinid wasp or an embolemid wasp.	
Praegastrinus edithae	Jouault & Nel	2024	A praeaulacid wasp.	
Prolemistus apiformis	Antropov	2000	A Crabronid wasp	
Prosphex anthophilos	Grimaldi, Peñalver, Barrón, et al.	2019	A probable stem-group Aculeatan of uncertain placement, possibly a panguid.	
Phoriostephanus exilis	Engel & Huang	2016	A crown wasp.	
Prionaspidion brevidens	Lepeco & Melo in Lepeco, Barbosa & Melo	2022	A member of Aculeata belonging to the family Trifionychidae.	
Prionaspidion nanus	Lepeco & Melo in Lepeco, Barbosa & Melo	2022	A member of Aculeata belonging to the family Trifionychidae.	
Pristinopterus spectabilis	Rosa & Melo	2021	A bembicine wasp.	
Pristopsen obscurus	Rosa & Melo	2021	A member of the tribe Psenini.	
Prosyntexis antennata	Li et al.	2023	A sepulcid sawfly.	
Prosyntexis aristovi	Li et al.	2023	A sepulcid sawfly.	
Prosyntexis lata	Li et al.	2023	A sepulcid sawfly.	
Proterosceliopsis ambulata	Talamas, Shih & Ren in Talamas et al.	2019	A proterosceliopsid platygastroid wasp.	
Proterosceliopsis nigon	Talamas, Shih & Ren in Talamas et al.	2019	A proterosceliopsid platygastroid wasp.	
Proterosceliopsis plurima	Talamas, Shih & Ren in Talamas et al.	2019	A proterosceliopsid platygastroid wasp.	
Proterosceliopsis torquata	Talamas, Shih & Ren in Talamas et al.	2019	A proterosceliopsid platygastroid wasp.	
Proterosceliopsis wingerathi	Talamas, Shih & Ren in Talamas et al.	2019	A proterosceliopsid platygastroid wasp.	
Protobelyta monsirei	Jouault, Perrichot & Nel	2020	A diapriid wasp.	
Protobracon robusticauda	Chen et al.	2020	A braconid wasp.	
Protoceratomyrmex revelatus	Perrichot, Wang & Barden	2020	A haidomyrmecine ant	
Protofoenus swinhoei	Cockerell	1917	An Aulacidae wasp	
Prototeleia kleio	Talamas et al.	2021	A platygastrid wasp.	
Protovespa haxairei	Perrard & Carpenter	2017	A vespid wasp.	
Protozigrasimecia chauli	Cao, Boudinot & Gao in Cao et al.	2020	A zigrasimeciine ant.	
Pseudodryinus burmensis	Olmi, Xu & Guglielmino	2014	A dryinid wasp.	
Ptilocosmus corniculatus	Rosa & Melo	2021	A heterogynaid wasp.	
Pyramidibracon clypeatus	Chen et al.	2020	A braconid wasp.	
Ramageoptera platycephala	Jouault & Brazidec	2021	A protopristocerine bethylid wasp.	
Raptodryinus patrickmuelleri	Olmi et al.	2020	A dryinid wasp	
Rasnichneumon alexandri	Kopylov, Zhang & Zhang	2021	An ichneumon wasp.	
Rasnichneumon gibbosus	Kopylov & Jouault	2024	An ichneumon wasp.	
Rasnichneumon gracilis	Kopylov, Zhang & Zhang	2021	An ichneumon wasp.	
Rasnichneumon klopfsteinae	Kopylov & Jouault	2024	An ichneumon wasp.	
Rasnichneumon nevergo	Jouault & Huang	2024	An ichneumon wasp.	
Rasnitsevania ferox	Jouault, Nel & Perrichot	2020	A praeaulacid wasp.	
Rasnitsynum burmense	Olmi et al.	2021	A dryinid wasp.	
Rhapidogyna elongata	Rosa & Melo	2024	A temnogynid apoid wasp.	
Rhapidogyna festiva	Rosa & Melo	2024	A temnogynid apoid wasp.	
Rhapidogyna prima	Rosa & Melo	2024	A temnogynid apoid wasp.	
Rhetinorhyssalus morticinus	Engel	2016	A braconid wasp.	
Rhynchopsenella argentea	Lepeco & Melo	2022	A scolebythid wasp.	
Rhynchopsenella bicarinata	Lepeco & Melo	2022	A scolebythid wasp.	
Rhynchopsenella diaphana	Lepeco & Melo	2022	A scolebythid wasp.	
Rogichneumon braconidicus	Kopylov, Zhang & Zhang	2021	An ichneumon wasp.	
Sclerodermus quadridentatus	Cockerell	1917	A Bethylidae wasp	
Sclerogibba cretacica	Martynova et al.	2019	A sclerogibbid wasp.	
Sclerosyntexis hirsuta	Wang et al.	2020	An anaxyelid sawfly.	
Seneciobracon novalatus	Engel & Huang in Engel et al.	2018	A braconid wasp.	
Siccibythus aristovi	Wang, Rasnitsyn, Perkovsky & Vilhelmsen	2025	A falsiformicid wasp.	
Siccibythus martynovae	Rasnitsyn et al.	2020	A falsiformicid wasp.	
Siccibythus musculosus	Cockx & McKellar	2016	A falsiformicid wasp.	
Siccibythus oculatus	Rasnitsyn et al.	2020	A falsiformicid wasp.	
Siccibythus ohmkuhnlei	Rasnitsyn et al.	2020	A falsiformicid wasp.	
Siccibythus pallidus	Rasnitsyn et al.	2020	A falsiformicid wasp.	
Siccibythus paulus	Rasnitsyn et al.	2020	A falsiformicid wasp.	
Siccibythus robustus	Wang, Rasnitsyn, Perkovsky & Vilhelmsen	2025	A falsiformicid wasp.	
Simplisphex burmensis	Rosa & Melo	2023	A burmasphecid apoid wasp.	
Simplisphex scutellatus	Rosa & Melo	2023	A burmasphecid apoid wasp.	
Sinuevania mira	Li et al.	2018	An evanioid wasp.	
Sinuevania pouilloni	Jouault & Nel	2024		
Sorellevania deansi	Engel	2006	An ensign wasp	
Sorellevania guillami	Jouault	2023	An evaniid wasp.	
Sorellevania rara	Li, Shih & Ren in Li et al.	2023	An evaniid wasp.	
Spheciellus aenigmaticus	Rosa & Melo	2021	A spheciellid apoid wasp.	
Stelepelecinus minutus	Wang et al.	2023	A pelecinid wasp.	
Stephanorhyssalus longiscapus	Belokobylskij & Jouault	2021	A braconid wasp.	
Striaexyela longicornis	Zheng et al.	2019	A syspastoxyelid wasp.	
Striaexyela simpla	(Wang et al.)	2019	A syspastoxyelid sawfly. Originally described as Syspastoxyela simpla.	
Supraserphites draculi	Rasnitsyn & Öhm-Kühnle	2019	A serphitid wasp.	
Supraserphites margritae	Rasnitsyn & Öhm-Kühnle	2020	A serphitid wasp.	
Supraserphites sidorchukae	Rasnitsyn & Öhm-Kühnle	2019	A serphitid wasp.	
Supraserphites vorontsovi	Rasnitsyn & Öhm-Kühnle	2020	A serphitid wasp.	
Syspastoxyela rhaphidia	Engel & Huang in Engel et al.	2016	A syspastoxyelid sawfly.	
Temnogyna elegans	Rosa & Melo	2024	A temnogynid apoid wasp.	
Temnogyna multiplex	Rosa & Melo	2024	A temnogynid apoid wasp.	
Temnogyna nyx	Rosa & Melo	2024	A temnogynid apoid wasp.	
Thagyaminobythus martini	Rosse-Guillevic, Jouault & Brazidec	2023	A member of Chrysidoidea of uncertain affinities.	
Thanatotiphia nyx	Engel, Ortega-Blanco & Bennett	2009	A tiphiid wasp	
Thaumatorrhinos athrix	Martins & Melo	2024	A thaumatodryinine dryinid wasp.	
Thigmocosmus longicornis	Rosa & Melo	2021	A heterogynaid wasp.	
Tibialobracon compressicornis	Chen et al.	2020	A braconid wasp.	
Tibialobracon laevis	Li et al.	2023	A braconid wasp.	
Tichostephanus hui	Engel	2019	A crown wasp.	
Tichostephanus kachinensis	Wang et al.	2024		
Tichostephanus longus	Wang et al.	2024		
Trifionyx pilosus	Lepeco & Melo in Lepeco, Barbosa & Melo	2022	A member of Aculeata belonging to the family Trifionychidae.	
Trifionyximus cracens	Lepeco & Melo in Lepeco, Barbosa & Melo	2022	A member of Aculeata belonging to the family Trifionychidae.	
Trigampulex pervetus	(Cockerell)	1917	A wasp of uncertain placement.	
Tumidistephanus prometheus	Ge & Tan in Ge et al.	2023	A stephanid wasp.	
Uniceratops trex	Colombo, Gobbi & Azevedo	2020	A bethylid wasp.	
Vertibracon brevistigma	Chen & van Achterberg in Li et al.	2023	A braconid wasp.	
Vespatula condaminei	Jouault	2023	A vespid wasp.	
Xenodellitha preta	Engel	2017	An othniodellithid evanioid wasp.	
Zigrasimecia boudinoti	Chaul	2023	A zigrasimeciine ant.	
Zigrasimecia caohuijiae	Chaul	2023	A zigrasimeciine ant.	
Zigrasimecia chuyangsui	Chaul	2023	A zigrasimeciine ant.	
Zigrasimecia ferox	Perrichot	2014	A zigrasimeciine ant	
Zigrasimecia goldingot	Zhuang et al.	2021	A zigrasimeciine ant.	
Zigrasimecia hoelldobleri	Cao, Boudinot & Gao in Cao et al.	2020	A zigrasimeciine ant.	
Zigrasimecia perrichoti	Chaul	2023	A zigrasimeciine ant.	
Zigrasimecia thate	Chaul	2023	A zigrasimeciine ant.	
Zigrasimecia tonsora	Barden & Grimaldi	2013	A Zigrasimeciine ant	
Zigrasimecia zui	Zhuang et al.	2023	A zigrasimeciine ant.	
Zoropelecinus periosus	Guo et al.	2016	A pelecinid wasp.	
Zoropelecinus zigrasi	Engel & Grimaldi	2013	A pelecinid wasp.	
