= Rotoiti =

Rotoiti may be:

== Places ==
- Lake Rotoiti (Bay of Plenty), a lake in the Bay of Plenty area of New Zealand

- Rotoiti, Bay of Plenty, a locality on the shore of Lake Rotoiti

- Lake Rotoiti (Tasman), a lake in the Tasman area of New Zealand
- Mount Rotoiti, a peak in the Frigate Range, Antarctica
- Rotoiti, the former name of Saint Arnaud, New Zealand

== Ships ==
- HMNZS Rotoiti, a list of Royal New Zealand Navy ships
- Rotoiti-class inshore patrol vessel, or Lake class, a class of ships of the Royal New Zealand Navy

== See also ==
- Rotoitidae, a family of parasitic wasps
  - Rotoita basalis, a wasp in the family Rotoitidae
