= Rotoita basalis =

Scientific classification
- Domain: Eukaryota
- Kingdom: Animalia
- Phylum: Arthropoda
- Class: Insecta
- Order: Hymenoptera
- Family: Baeomorphidae
- Genus: Rotoita
- Species: R. basalis

Binomial name
- Rotoita basalis Bouček & Noyes, 1987

Species of wasp

Rotoita basalis is a small parasitic wasp in the relictual family Baeomorphidae. It is known only from New Zealand, and its closest known living relative (and only other extant species in the same family) is endemic to Chile (Chiloe micropteron).

== Unique anatomy ==
Baeomorphids are very near to the base of the chalcidoid family tree, close to the Mymaridae. Unusual characteristics of Rotoita include a 14-segmented antennae in the female with a distinct 6-segmented clava (club-like segments at the end of antennae), a basal vein in the fore wing, a transverse scutellum, extremely reduced and hidden prepectus, and absence of notauli.

Specimens are approximately 1mm in length.

== Biology ==
They are suspected to be parasitoids of the relictual true bug family Peloridiidae.

== Taxonomy ==
The new genus and species was described as Rotoita basalis by Zdenek Boucek and John S. Noyes in 1987, and placed into a newly-recognized family they dubbed "Rotoitidae", based on three fully winged females from New Zealand. The authors stated that they also had two other females from the North and South Islands of New Zealand that might represent two additional species. It was later realized that these were extant members of a family that had been previously considered to be extinct, Baeomorphidae, and are now placed in that family.

== Etymology ==
A slide-mounted female from St. Arnaud (formally Rotoiti Village) is listed as a paratype used to describe the species. Lake Rotoiti is a large fresh water body and a dominant feature when visiting Saint Arnaud Village: it was inspiration when naming the genus. The Maori name "Rotoiti" translates simply as "Little Lake".
