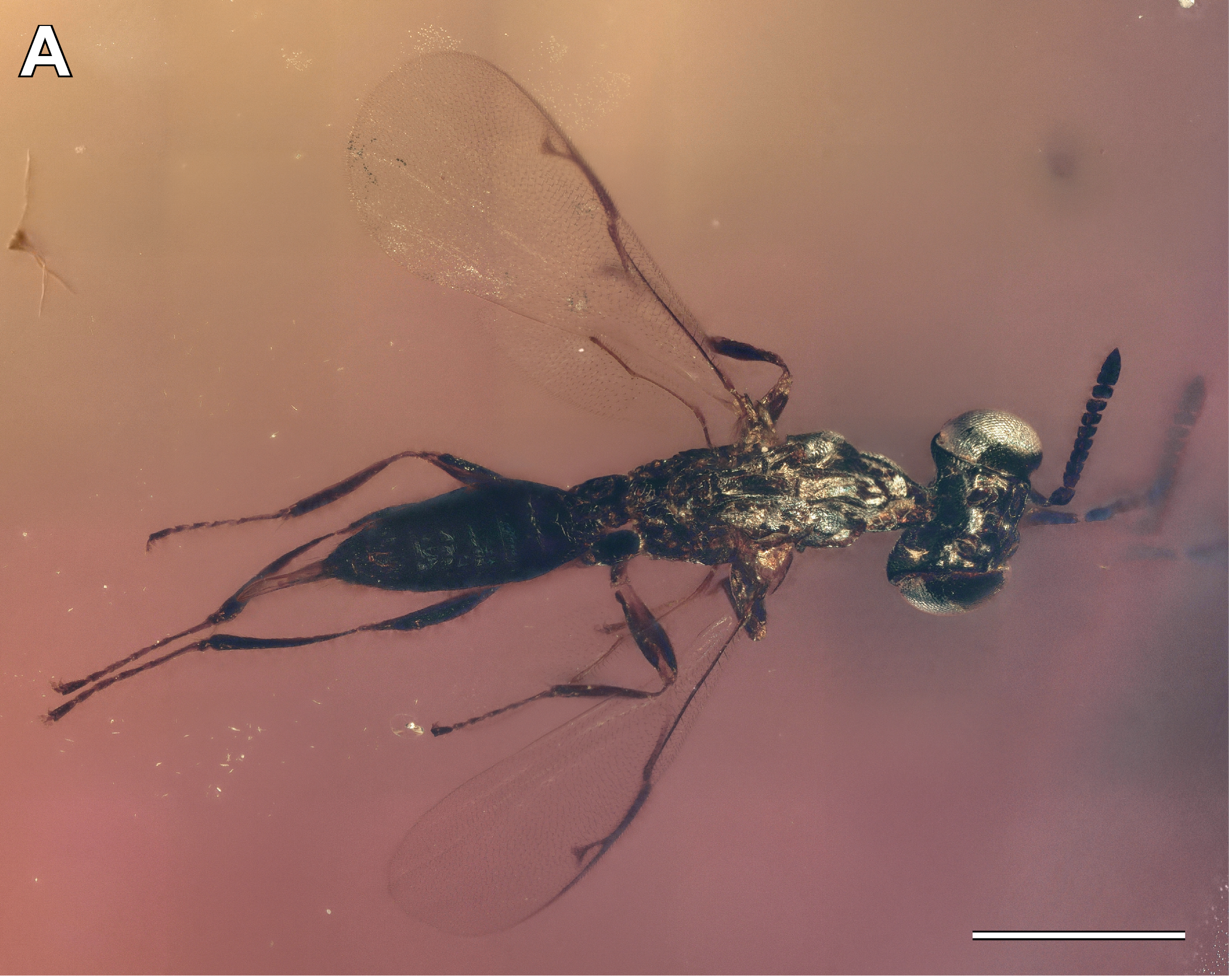

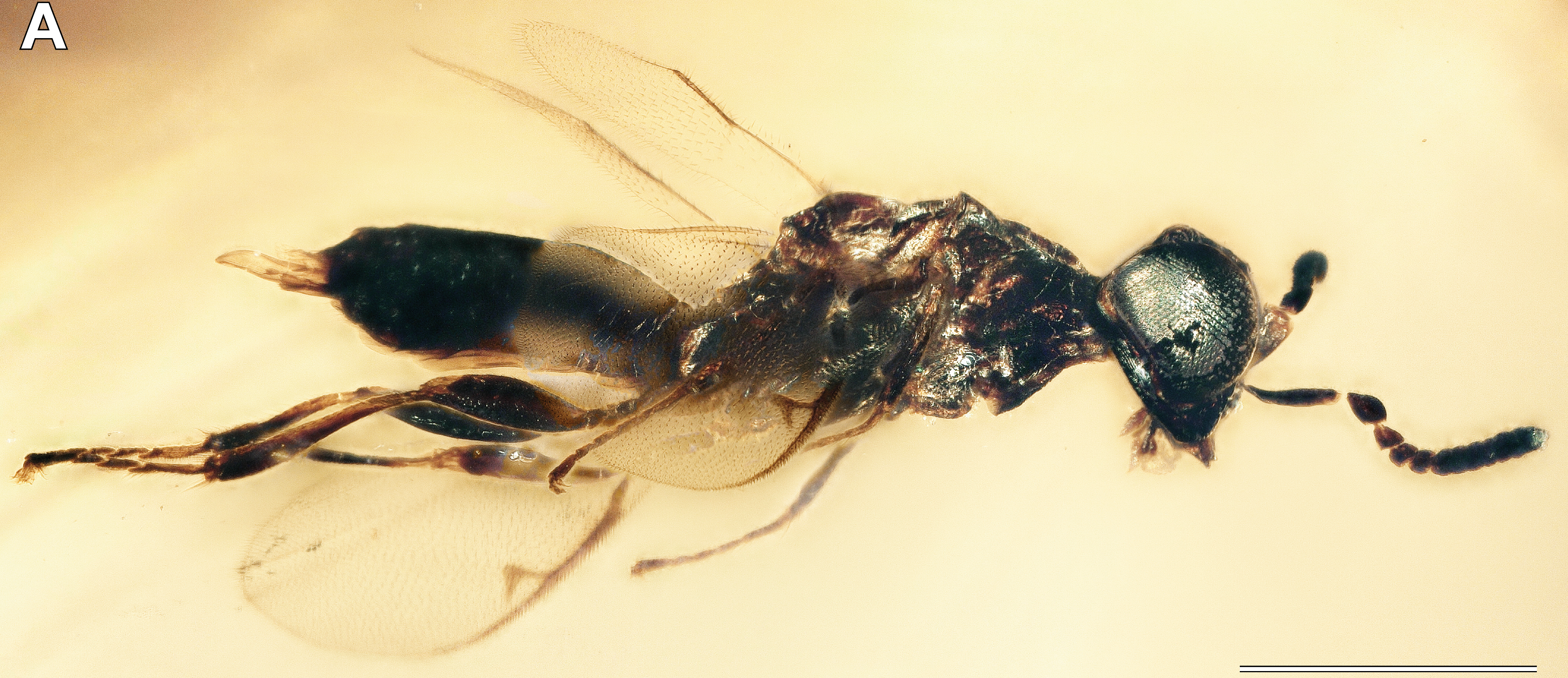
- Holotype specimen in dorsal and lateral views

Scientific classification
- Kingdom: Animalia
- Phylum: Arthropoda
- Class: Insecta
- Order: Hymenoptera
- Family: †Diversinitidae
- Genus: †Diversinitus
- Species: †D. attenboroughi

Binomial name
- †Diversinitus attenboroughi Haas, Burks and Krogmann 2018

= Diversinitus =

Diversinitus Temporal range: Earliest Cenomanian 99 Ma

Extinct genus of wasps

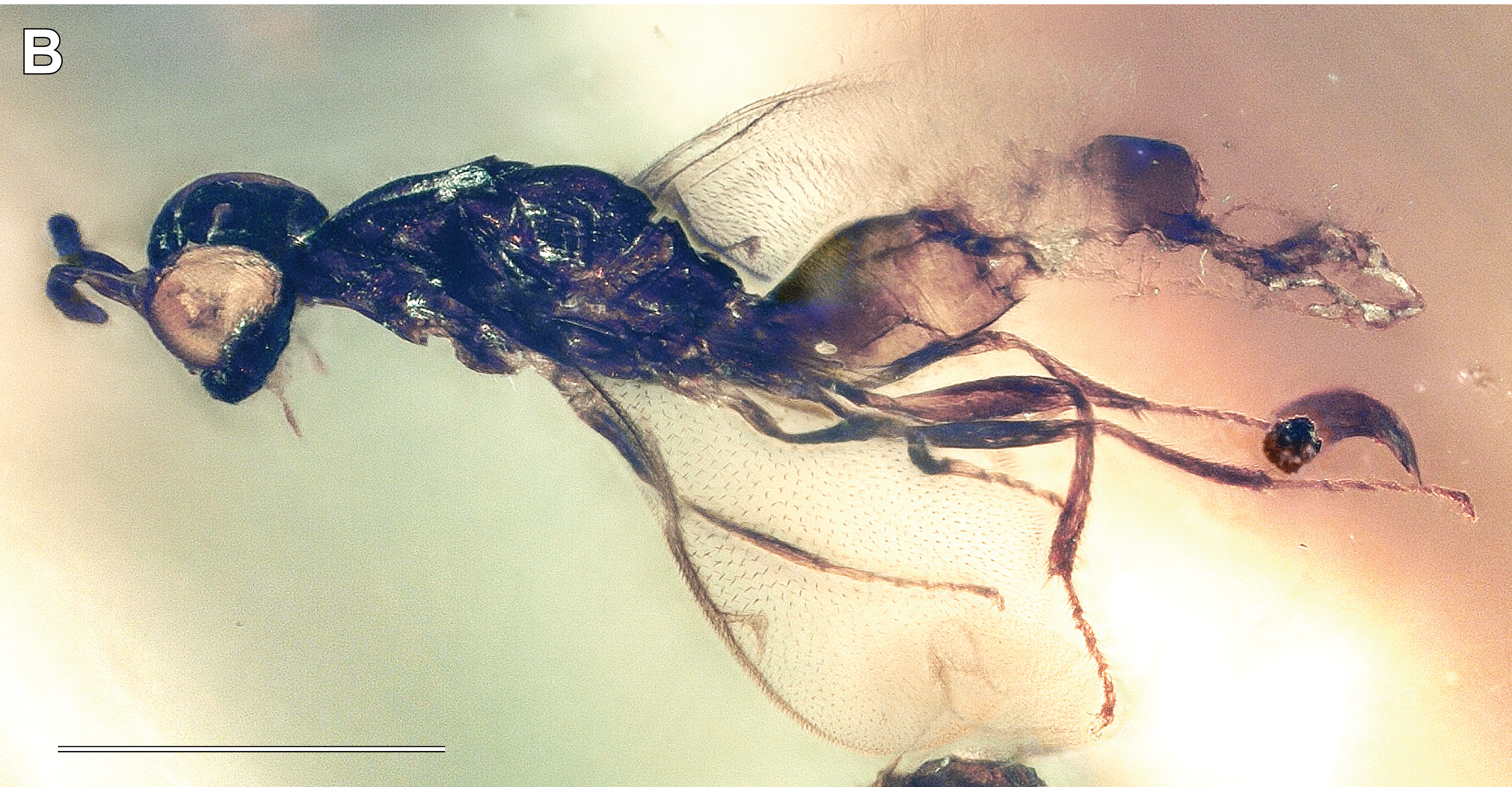
Paratype specimen

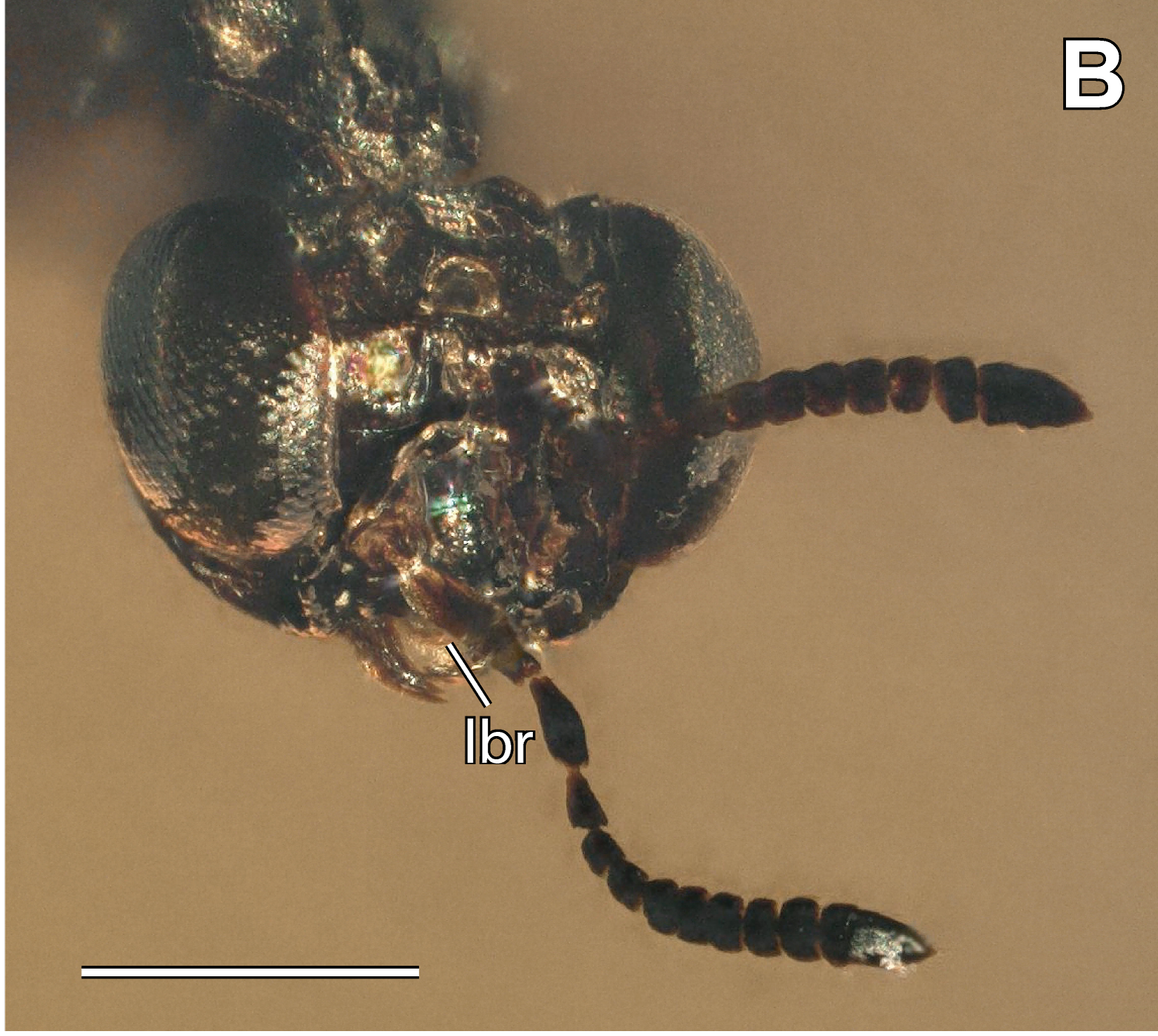
Head closeup

Diversitinus is an extinct genus of chalcid wasp, belonging to the extinct family Diversinitidae, of which it is the type genus. It contains a single species D. attenboroughi known from 2 male specimens from the earliest Cenomanian aged Burmese amber of the Hukawng Valley in Myanmar, around 99 million years old. The genus name originates from the Latin diversus, meaning different or diverse and initus which means origin or start, reflecting the great diversity of chalcid wasps. The species name is taken from the famous naturalist and broadcaster David Attenborough.
