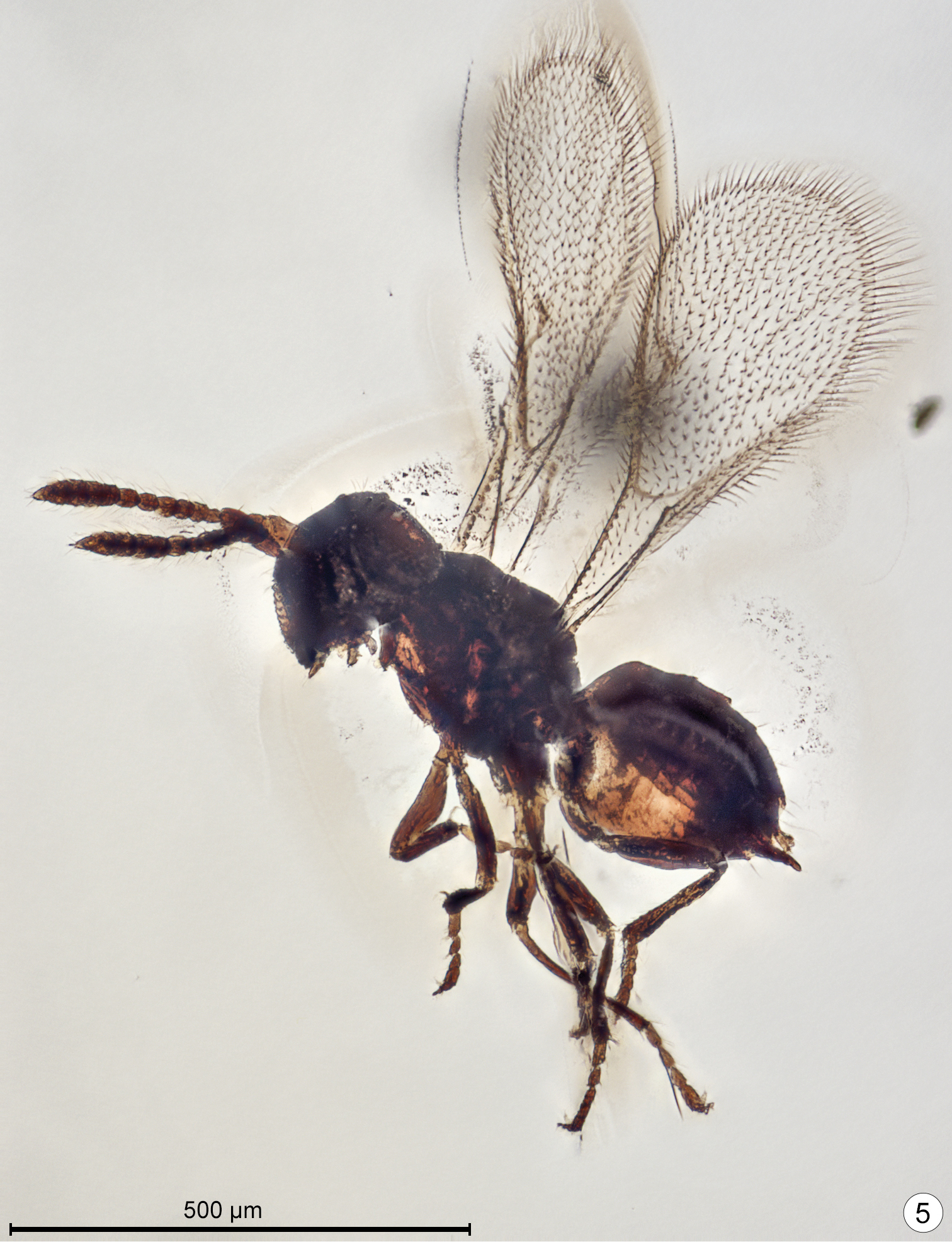
- B. liorum male
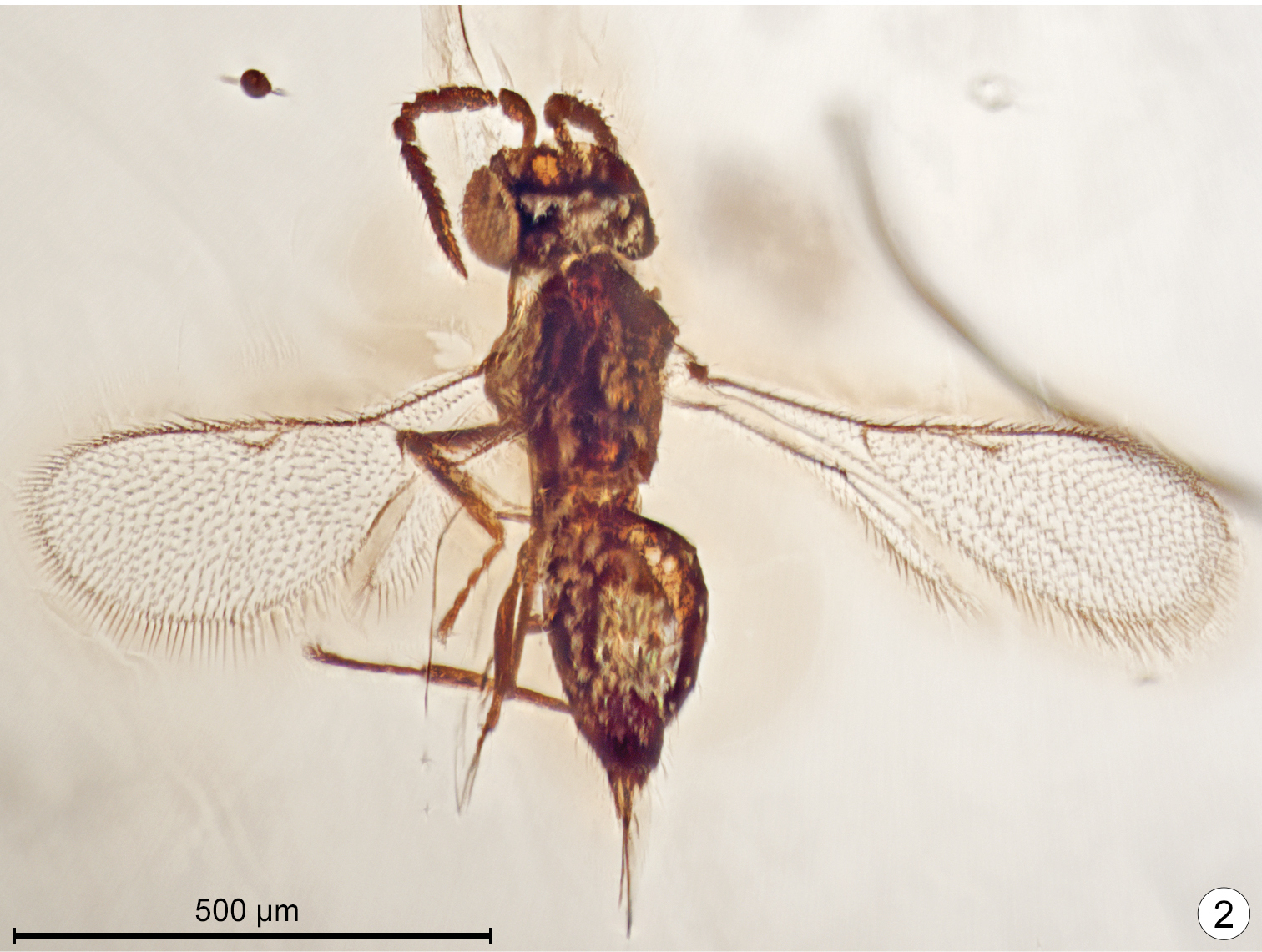
- B. liorum holotype female

Scientific classification
- Domain: Eukaryota
- Kingdom: Animalia
- Phylum: Arthropoda
- Class: Insecta
- Order: Hymenoptera
- Family: Baeomorphidae
- Genus: †Baeomorpha; Brues, 1937

Type species
- †Baeomorpha dubitata Brues, 1937

Other species
- See text

= Baeomorpha =

Baeomorpha Temporal range: Cenomanian–Campanian

Extinct genus of wasps

Baeomorpha is an extinct genus of baeomorphid parasitic wasp, known from the Late Cretaceous (~99-72 ma) of Laurasia. The type species, B. dubitata was named by Charles Thomas Brues for a specimen found in 72 million year old Canadian Amber. The vast majority of species are known from the Russian Taimyr amber, of upper Santonian age but two species (including type) are known from the upper Campanian Canadian amber, while one species is known from the lower Cenomanian Burmese amber.

== Taxonomy ==
In the initial 1937 description, Brues placed the genus within the Scelionidae. Yoshimoto [de] in 1975 placed it in a new subfamily Baeomorphinae within Tetracampidae In 2017 during a comprehensive review of the genus, it was placed in the family Rotoitidae, an otherwise relict group only known from two extant genera in New Zealand and Chile, but Yoshimoto's name is older than Rotoitidae, and is therefore recognized as the correct family name. The study also placed two species described by Yoshimoto, B. distincta and B. elongata as synonyms of B. ovatata. In 2019 a new species B. liorum was described from the Burmese amber, significantly increasing the latitudinal and stratigraphic range of the taxon.

- Baeomorpha avamica Gumovsky, 2017 Taimyr amber
- Baeomorpha baikurensis Gumovsky, 2017 Taimyr amber
- Baeomorpha bianellus Gumovsky, 2017 Taimyr amber
- Baeomorpha caeleps Gumovsky, 2017 Taimyr amber
- Baeomorpha dubitata Brues, 1937 Canadian amber
- Baeomorpha gracilis Gumovsky, 2017 Taimyr amber
- Baeomorpha ingens Gumovsky, 2017 Taimyr amber
- Baeomorpha liorum Huber, Shih & Ren, 2019 Burmese amber
- Baeomorpha ovatata Yoshimoto, 1975 Canadian amber,
- Baeomorpha popovi Gumovsky, 2017 Taimyr amber
- Baeomorpha quattorduo Gumovsky, 2017 Taimyr amber
- Baeomorpha quattoruno Gumovsky, 2017 Taimyr amber
- Baeomorpha yantardakh Gumovsky, 2017 Taimyr amber
- Baeomorpha zherikhini Gumovsky, 2017 Taimyr amber
