= John Noyes (entomologist) =

Welsh entomologist

John Stuart Noyes (born 1949 in Cardiff) is a Welsh entomologist.

At the age of 14 an article entitled "My Hobby has Wings" about Noyes appeared in his local newspaper, the Pontypridd Observer; this 1963 article highlighted Noyes' interest in entomology at an early age. In 1967 he began studying for a degree in zoology and applied entomology at Imperial College, London where he completed his doctoral thesis on the biology of the leek moth (Acrolepiopsis assectella). In 1974 he was appointed as a researcher in the Chalcidoidea at the British Museum (Natural History). He was seconded to the Department of Scientific and Industrial Research in New Zealand where he conducted a survey of the Chalcidoidea of New Zealand in 1980 and 1981. He travelled widely in the course of his research into the Chalcidoidea and has published over 80 papers, with some major monographs, and described one new family, 88 new genera and 644 new species of Chalcidoidea. When he retired he was reviewing the Costa Rican fauna of the Encyrtidae.

In 1991 he conceived of and implemented the Universal Chalcidoidea Database, an innovative and important online resource. He continued to maintain the database until his retirement, He was recognised by his peers in that at the time he retired one genus and 38 species, mainly of Hymenoptera, but including a beetle and a bug, were named after him. He sits on the review board of a number of journals and is a fellow of the Royal Entomological Society of London and a member of International Society of Hymenopterists.

He retired from service at the Natural History Museum at the age of 60 in 2009. In his personal life he is married to Mary and the couple have two daughters.

== Publications ==
A selection of publication by Noyes is:

- 1974 The biology of the leek moth, Acrolepia assectella (Zeller) Imperial College, London Ph.D. Thesis
- 1980 A review of the genera of Neotropical Encyrtidae (Hymenoptera: Chalcidoidea) Bulletin of the British Museum (Natural History) Entomology 41(3) pages 107–253
- 1984 (& M. Hayat) A review of the genera of Indo-Pacific Encyrtidae (Hymenoptera: Chalcidoidea) Bulletin of the British Museum (Natural History) Entomology 48(3) pages 131–395
- 1987 A review of the species of Neococcidencyrtus (Hymenoptera: Encyrtidae), parasites of diaspidid scale insects Journal of Natural History 21(4) pages 995–1019
- 1987 ( & Zdenek Boucek) Rotoitidae, a curious new family of Chalcidoidea (Hymenoptera) from New Zealand Systematic Entomology 12(4) pages 407–412
- 1990 A new genus and species of encyrtid (Hymenoptera, Chalcidoidea) parasitoid of the eggs of the varicose borer, Agrilus sexsignatus (Fisher) (Coleoptera, Buprestidae), a pest of bagras (Eucalyptus deglupta Blume) in the Philippines Journal of Natural History 24(1) pages 21–25
- 1991 A new species of Ooencyrtus (Hymenoptera; Encyrtidae) from Malaysia, a prepupal parasitoid of the cocoa pod borer, Conopomorpha cramerella (Snellen) (Lepidoptera; Gracillariidae) Journal of Natural History 25(6) pages 1617–1622
- 1995 (& H. Ren) Encyrtidae of Costa Rica (Hymenoptera: Chalcidoidea): the genus Aenasius Walker, parasitoids of mealybugs (Homoptera: Pseudococcidae) Bulletin of the Natural History Museum Entomology Series 64(2) pages 117–163
- 1996 (& Paul Hanson) Encyrtidae (Hymenoptera: Chalcidoidea) of Costa Rica: the genera and species associated with jumping plant-lice (Homoptera: Psylloidea) Bulletin of the Natural History Museum Entomology Series 65(2) pages 105–164
- 1999 (& Jean_Marc Anga) A revision of the African and Malagasy species of the genus Leptomastix (Hymenoptera, Encyrtidae), parasitoids of mealybugs (Homoptera: Pseudococcidae) Bulletin of the Natural History Museum Entomology Series 68(2) pages 93–128
- 2000 (& Emilio Guerrieri) Revision of European species of genus Metaphycus Mercet (Hymenoptera: Chalcidoidea: Encyrtidae), parasitoids of scale insects (Homoptera: Coccoidea) Systematic Entomology 25(2) pages 147–222
- 2000 Encyrtidae of Costa Rica (Hymenoptera: Chalcidoidea), 1: the subfamily Tetracneminae, parasitoids of Mealybugs (Homoptera: Pseudococcidae). John S. Noyes American Entomological Institute ISBN 1-887988-06-8 355 pp.
- 2002 (& Emilio Guerrieri) An unusual genus and species of Encyrtidae (Hymenoptera: Chalcidoidea) from Australia reared from soft scale insects (Hemiptera: Coccidae) Journal of Natural History 36(4) pages 443–448
- 2003 (& Stefan Schmidt) Two new egg parasitoids (Hymenoptera: Encyrtidae) of the wood borer Agrianome spinicollis (Macleay) (Coleoptera: Cerambycidae), a pest of pecans in eastern Australia Australian Journal of Entomology 42(1) pages 12–17 (2003)
- 2003 (& Michael E Schauff) New Encyrtidae (Hymenoptera) from papaya mealybug (Paracoccus marginatus Williams and Granara de Willink) (Hemiptera: Sternorrhyncha: Pseudococcidae) Proceedings of the Entomological Society of Washington 105(1) pages 180–185 (2003)
- 2004 Encyrtidae of Costa Rica (Hymenoptera:Chalcidoidea), 2: Metaphycus and Related Genera, Parasitoids of Scale Insects (Coccoidea) and Whiteflies (Aleyrodidae) Volume 2 of Encyrtidae of Costa Rica, American Entomological Institute ISBN 1887988173 459pp Memoirs of the American Entomological Institute, Mich American Entomological Institute Ann Arbor
- 2006 (& Giorgi Japoshvili) The Western Palaearctic species of Psilophrys Mayr (Hymenoptera, Chalcidoidea: Encyrtidae), parasitoids of kermesids (Hemiptera, Coccoidea: Kermesidae) attacking oaks (Quercus spp.) Journal of Natural History 40(29-31) pages 1793–1800
- 2008 (& S Manickavasagam; M R Mehrnejad) Cheiloneurus pistaciae sp. nov. (Hymenoptera: Encyrtidae) a facultative hyperparasitoid of Kermania pistaciella Amsel (Lepidoptera: Tineidae), a pest of pistachio trees in Iran Zootaxa 1958 pages 61–64 (2008)
- 2009 (& Emilio Guerrieri) A review of the European species of the genus Trechnites Thomson (Hymenoptera: Chalcidoidea: Encyrtidae), parasitoids of plant lice (Hemiptera: Psylloidea) with description of a new species Systematic Entomology 34(2) pages 252–259
- 2010 (& Emilio Guerrieri; Martinus E Huigens; Catalina Estrada; Jozef B Woelke; Marjolein De Rijk; Nina E Fatouros; Annette Aiello) Ooencyrtus marcelloi sp nov (Hymenoptera: Encyrtidae), an egg parasitoid of Heliconiini (Lepidoptera: Nymphalidae: Heliconiinae) on passion vines (Malpighiales: Passifloraceae) in Central America Journal of Natural History 44(1-2) pages 81–87
- 2010 Encyrtidae of Costa Rica (Hymenoptera: Chalcidoidea), 3: Subfamily Encyrtinae: Encyrtini, Echthroplexiellini, Discodini, Oobiini and Ixodiphagini, Parasitoids Associated with Bugs (Hemiptera), Insect Eggs (Hemiptera, Lepidoptera, Coleoptera, Neuroptera) and Ticks (Acari) Volume 3 of Encyrtidae of Costa Rica American Entomological Institute, 2010 ISBN 1887988289 848pp
- 2011 (& Emilio Guerrieri) Acerophagus artelles sp nov (Hymenoptera Chalcidoidea Encyrtidae), a biocontrol agent of Dysmicoccus grassii (Leonardi) (Hemiptera Coccoidea Pseudococcidae) on banana in the Canary Islands (Spain) Journal of Natural History 45(1-2) pages 29–34
- 2013 (& J. Huber). A new genus and species of fairyfly, Tinkerbella nana (Hymenoptera, Mymaridae), with comments on its sister genus Kikiki, and discussion on small size limits in arthropods Journal of Hymenoptera Research, 32, 17-44
