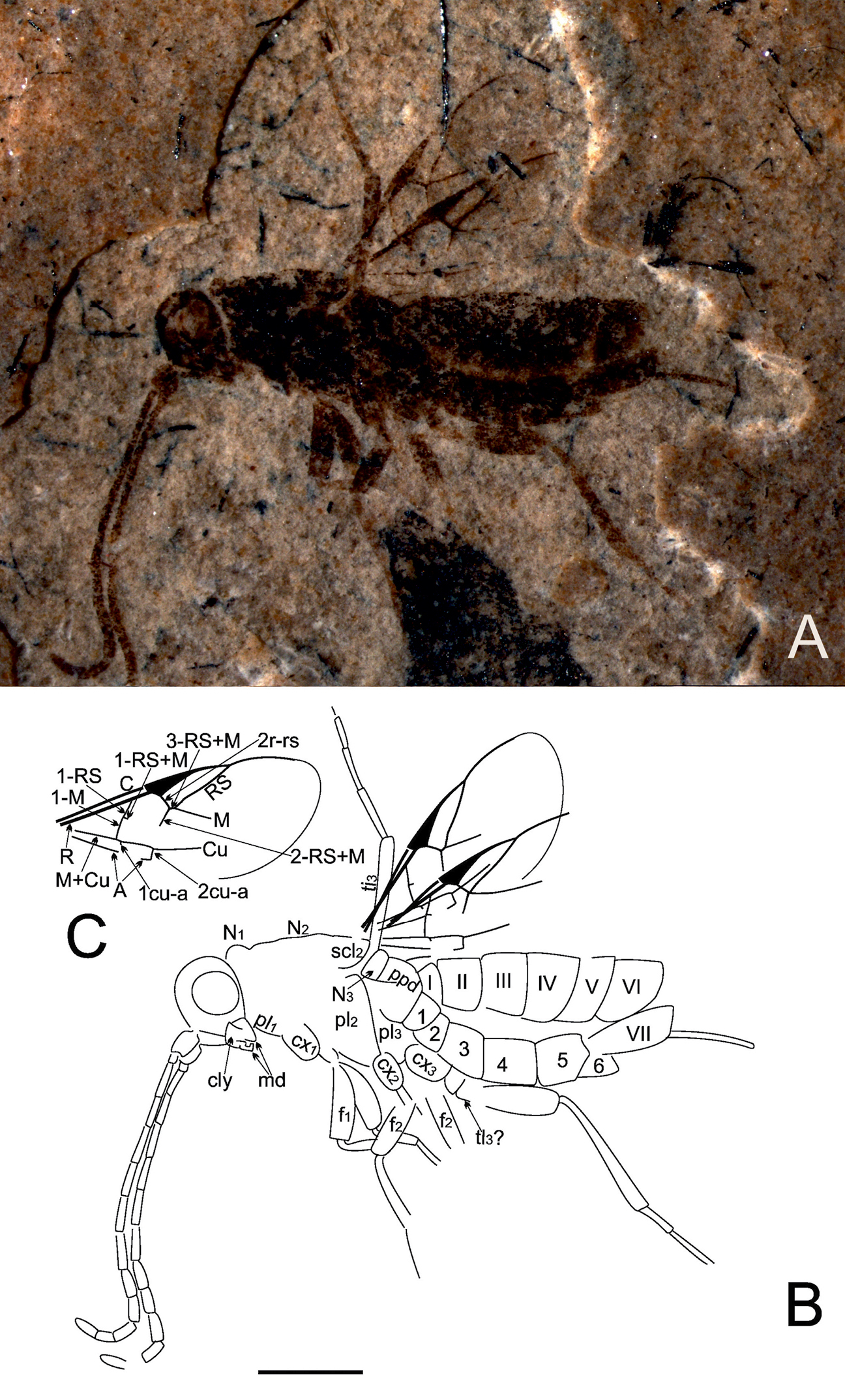
- Fossil and drawing of Arkadiserphus

Scientific classification
- Kingdom: Animalia
- Phylum: Arthropoda
- Clade: Pancrustacea
- Class: Insecta
- Order: Hymenoptera
- Superfamily: Proctotrupoidea
- Family: †Peleserphidae; Zhang, Rasnitsyn, Wang & Zhang, 2018

Genera
- †Arkadiserphus 166-157 million years ago; †Peleserphus 99 million years ago; †Peleproctus 100-93 million years ago

= Peleserphidae =

Peleserphidae Temporal range: Callovian–Cenomanian

Extinct family of wasps

Peleserphidae is an extinct family of wasps belonging to the superfamily Proctotrupoidea. It is currently known from four species in three genera. One (Arkadiserphus) from the Middle-Late Jurassic Karabastau Formation of Kazakhstan, and the others (Peleserphus and Peleproctus) from mid Cretaceous Burmese amber from Myanmar. They are suggested to have targeted hosts hidden in substrates like wood, such as insect larvae.
