= Chiloe micropteron =

Scientific classification
- Kingdom: Animalia
- Phylum: Arthropoda
- Clade: Pancrustacea
- Class: Insecta
- Order: Hymenoptera
- Family: Baeomorphidae
- Genus: Chiloe
- Species: C. micropteron

Binomial name
- Chiloe micropteron Gibson and Huber, 2000

Species of wasp

Chiloe micropteron is a species of wasp of the family Baeomorphidae (formerly treated as "Rotoitidae"). The species was described by Gibson and Huber in 2000 from specimens collected in Chile. The generic name is derived from Chiloé Island where many of the specimens were collected, and the species name is derived from its very small forewings.
