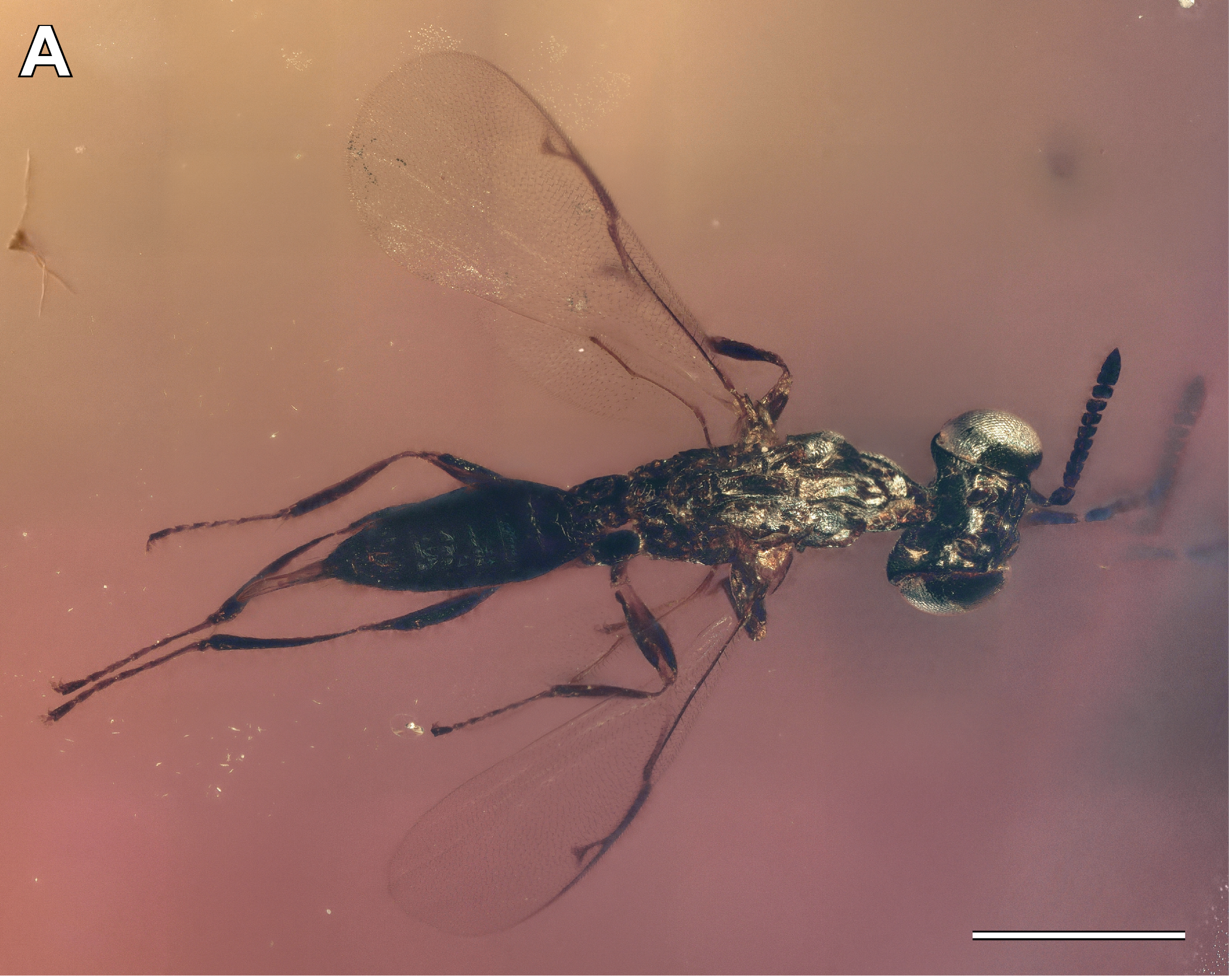
- Diversinitus
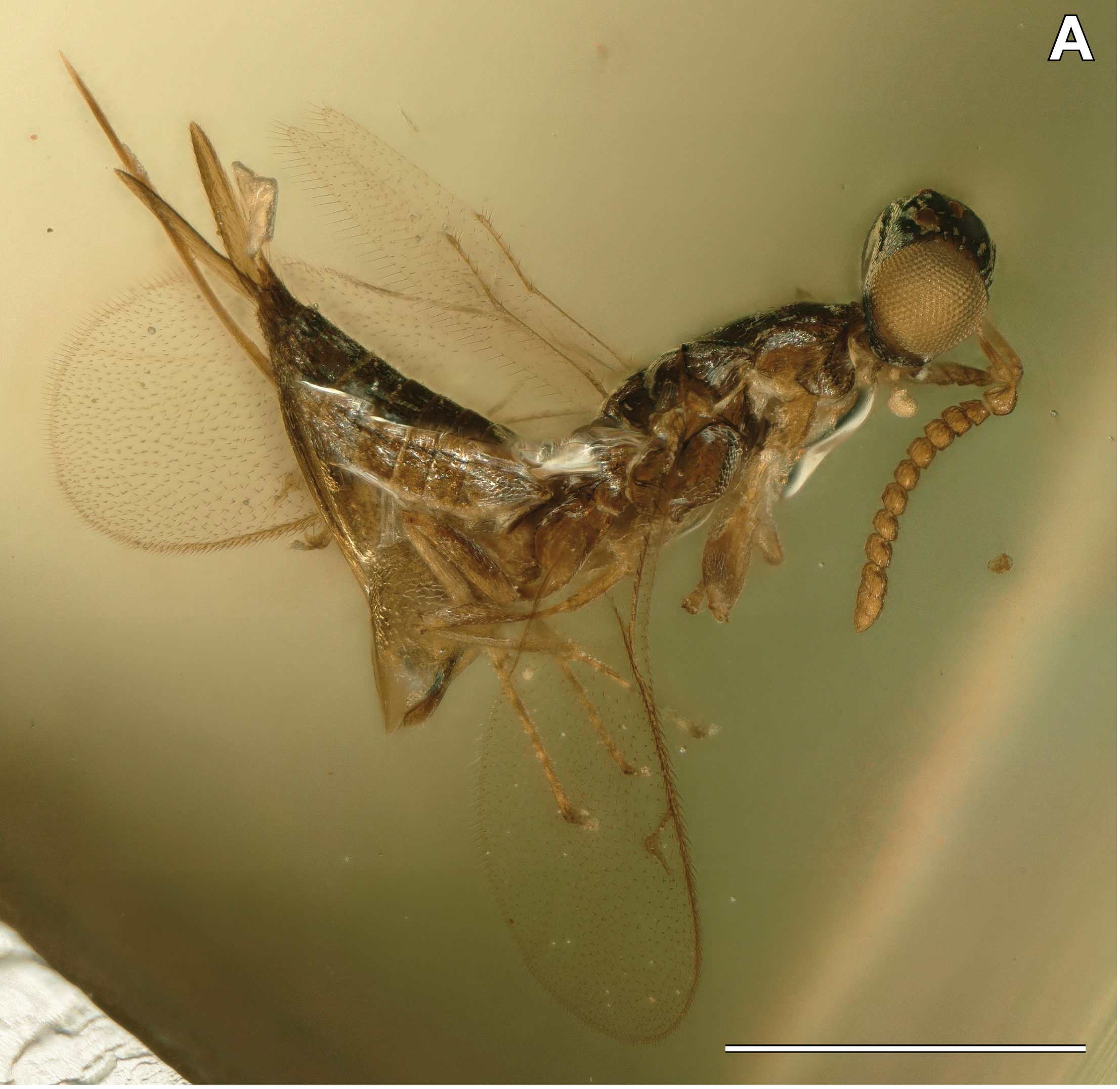
- Burminata

Scientific classification
- Kingdom: Animalia
- Phylum: Arthropoda
- Class: Insecta
- Order: Hymenoptera
- Superfamily: Chalcidoidea
- Family: †Diversinitidae; Haas, Burks and Krogmann 2018

Genera
- Diversinitus; Burminata; Glabiala

= Diversinitidae =

Diversinitidae Temporal range: Earliest Cenomanian 99 Ma

Extinct family of wasps

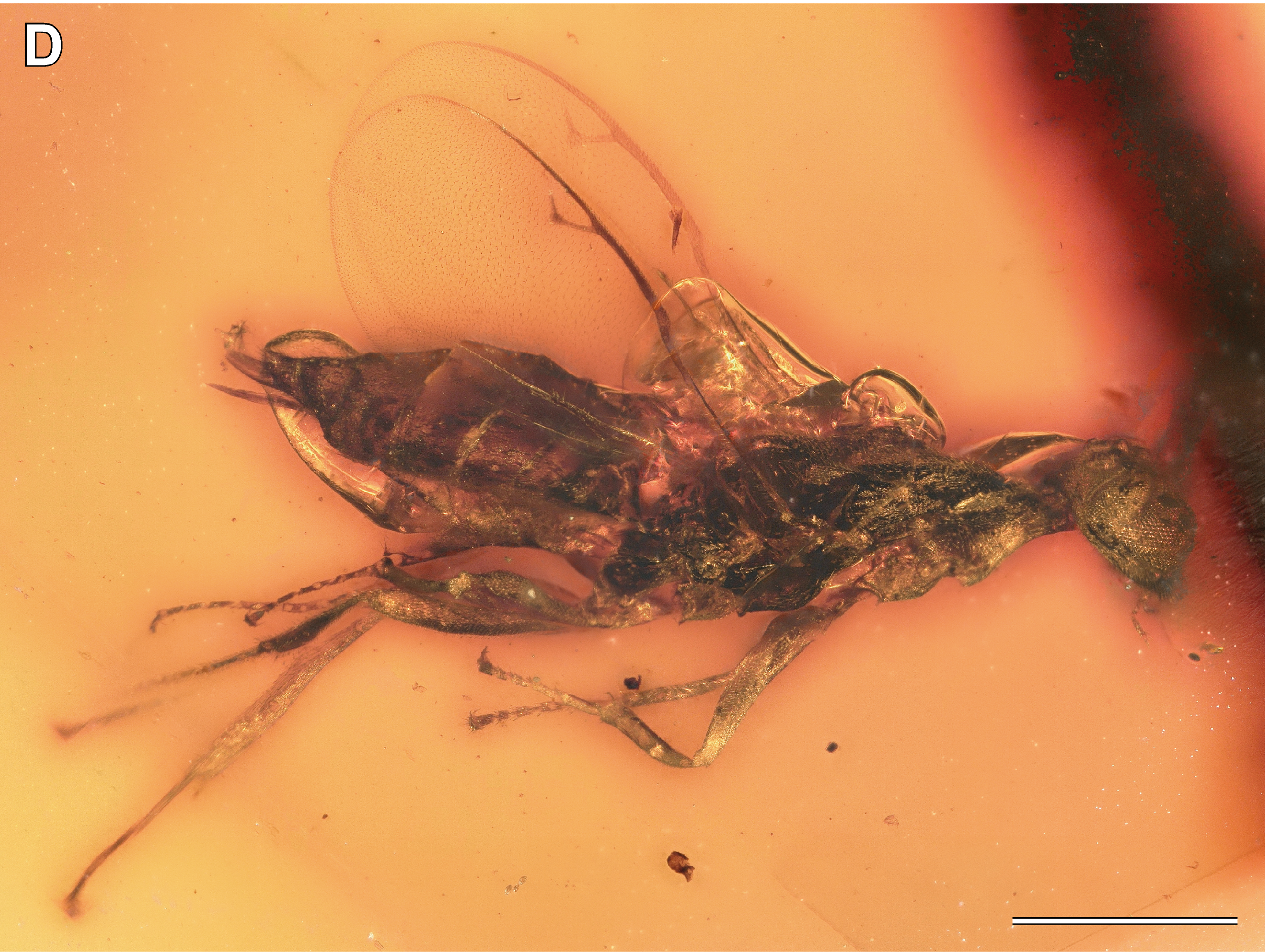
Glabiala barbata

Diversinitidae are an extinct family of Chalcid wasps. Three genera are known, all from the early Cenomanian aged Burmese amber. They are distinguished by the presence of multiporous plate sensilla on the first flagellomere in both sexes. They are among the most basal and earliest known members of Chalcidoidea.
