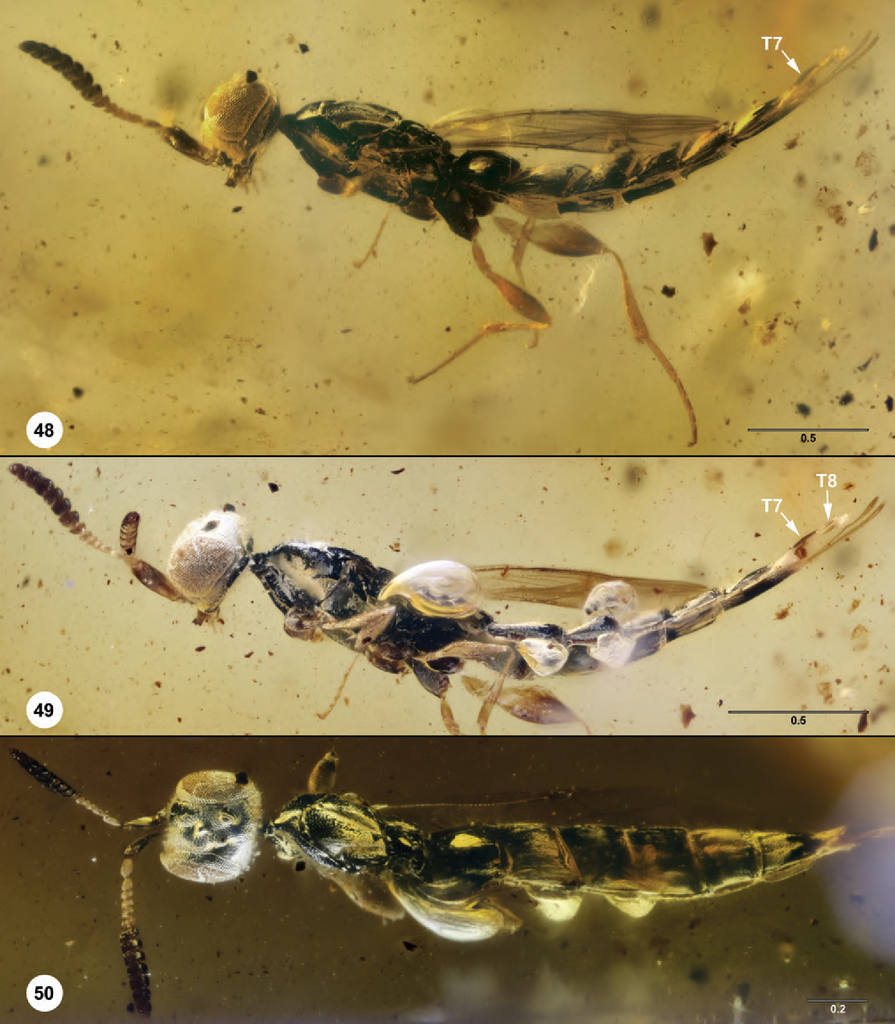
- Proterosceliopsis ambulata in multiple views

Scientific classification
- Domain: Eukaryota
- Kingdom: Animalia
- Phylum: Arthropoda
- Class: Insecta
- Order: Hymenoptera
- Superfamily: Platygastroidea
- Family: †Proterosceliopsidae; Talamas et al, 2019
- Genus: †Proterosceliopsis; Ortega-Blanco, McKellar and Engel, 2014

Type species
- †Proterosceliopsis masneri Ortega-Blanco, McKellar and Engel, 2014

Other species
- See text

= Proterosceliopsis =

Proterosceliopsis Temporal range: Albian–Cenomanian

Extinct genus of insects

Proterosceliopsis is an extinct genus of platygastroid parasitic wasp, known from the Mid-Cretaceous of Eurasia. The genus was first described in 2014 from the Albian amber of the Escucha Formation. In 2019 additional species were described from the Cenomanian-age Burmese amber, and was placed into the monotypic family Proterosceliopsidae.

== Taxonomy ==
In the initial 2014 description, the genus was placed in the Scelionidae. However, traditional Scelionidae was found to be polyphyletic in a 2007 study, which recovered a "main scelionid clade" as monophyletic. In the 2019 study describing the Burmese amber species, it was found to exhibit a unique combination of characters placing it outside both the modified Scelionidae and Platygastridae, thus causing it to be placed in a new family within Platygastroidea.

=== Species ===
- Proterosceliopsis ambulata Talamas et al. 2019 Burmese amber
- Proterosceliopsis masneri Ortega-Blanco et al. 2014 Spanish amber
- Proterosceliopsis nigon Talamas et al. 2019 Burmese amber
- Proterosceliopsis plurima Talamas et al. 2019 Burmese amber
- Proterosceliopsis torquata Talamas et al. 2019 Burmese amber
- Proterosceliopsis wingerathi Talamas et al. 2019 Burmese amber
Species of Proterosceliopsis
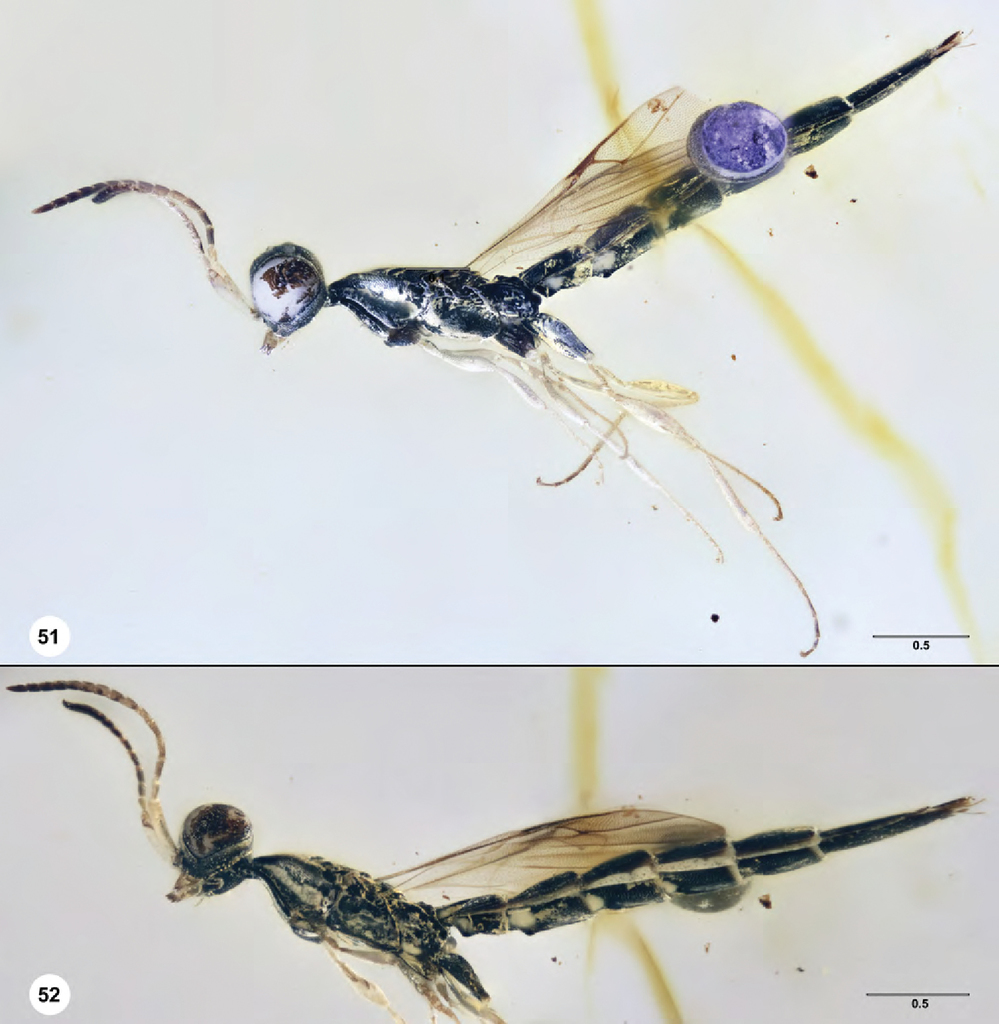
Proterosceliopsis plurima

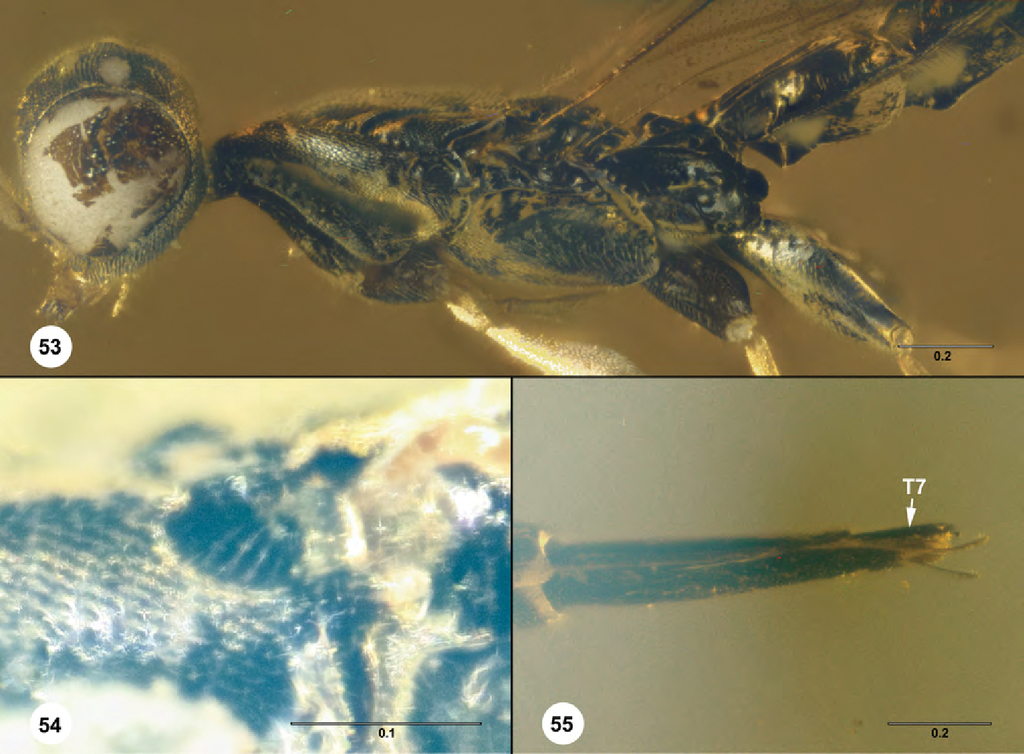
Proterosceliopsis plurima

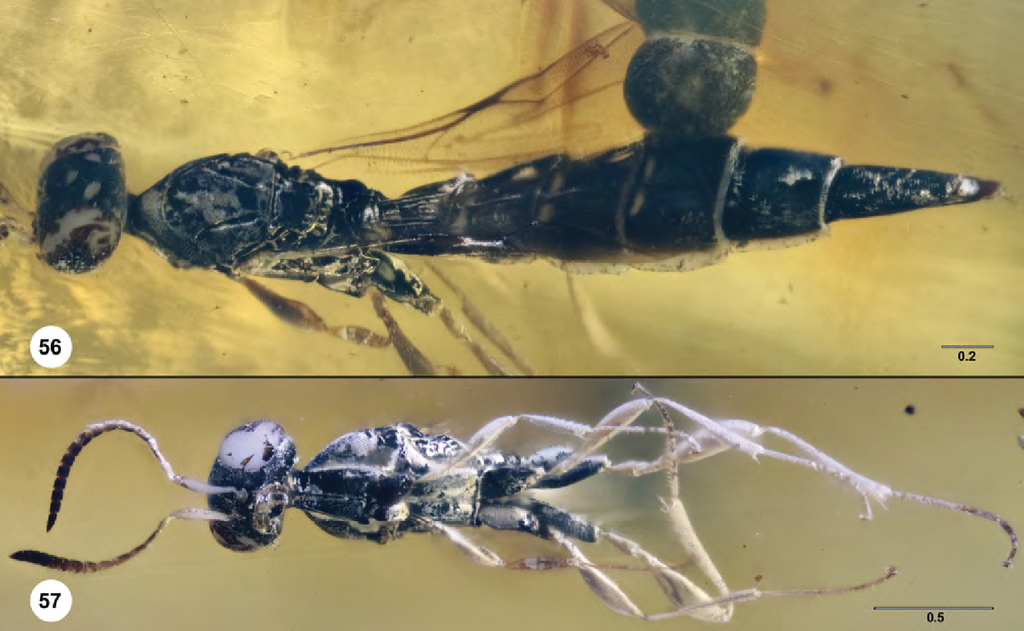
Proterosceliopsis plurima

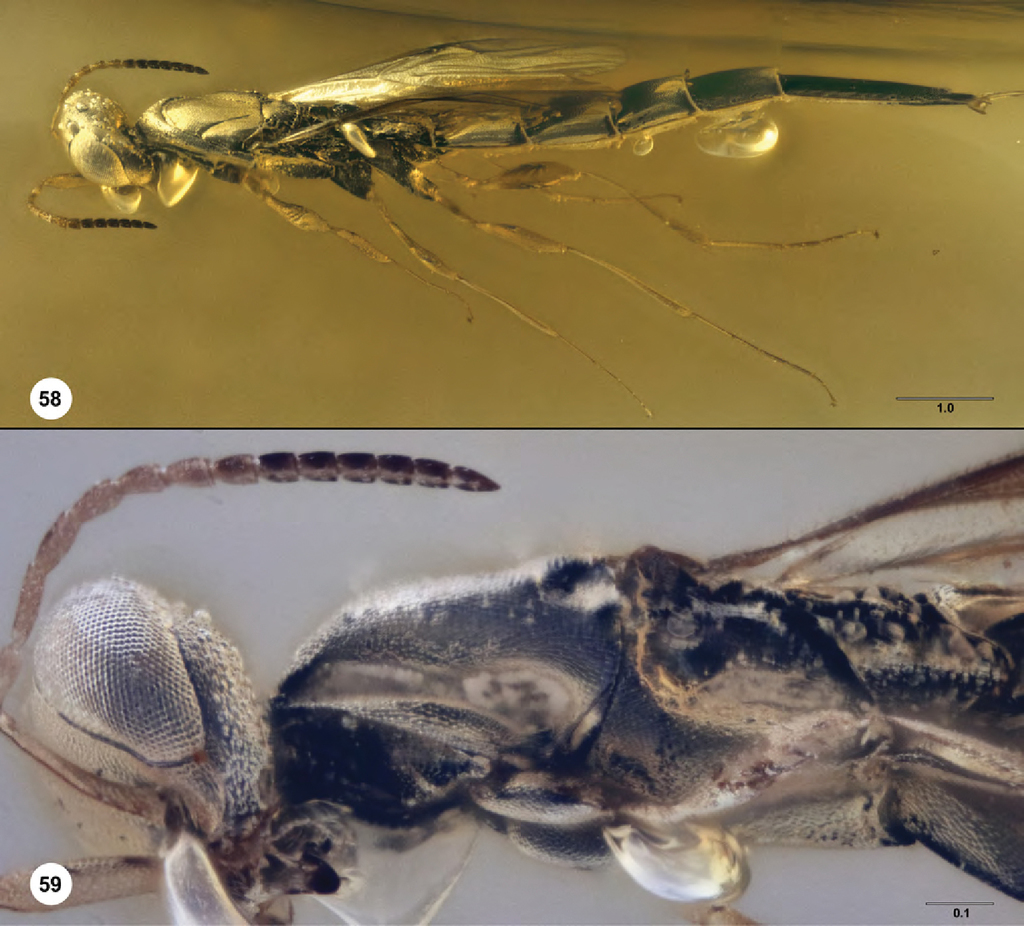
Proterosceliopsis torquata

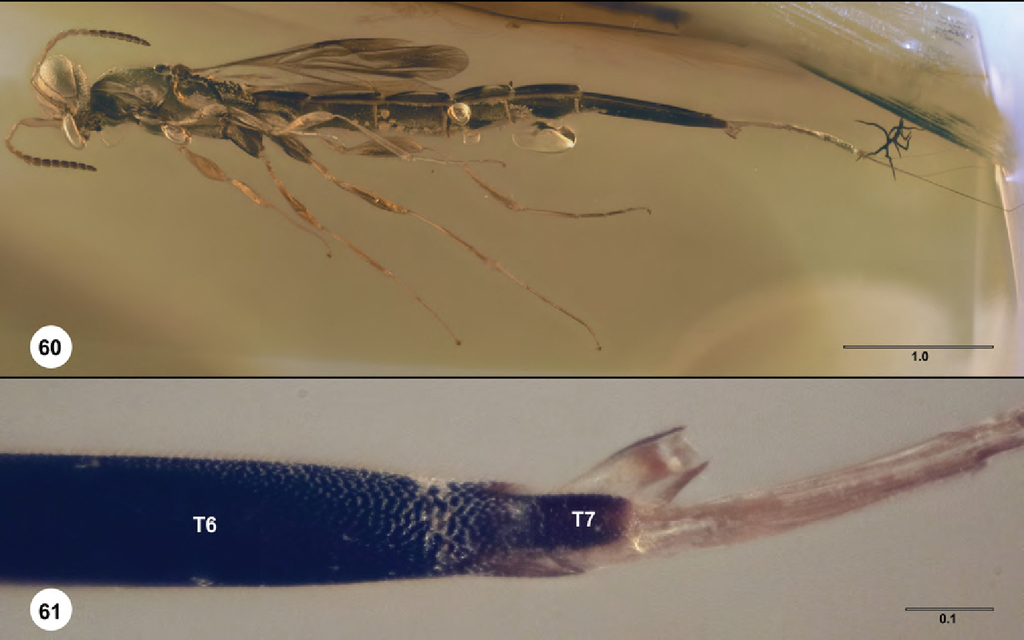
Proterosceliopsis torquata

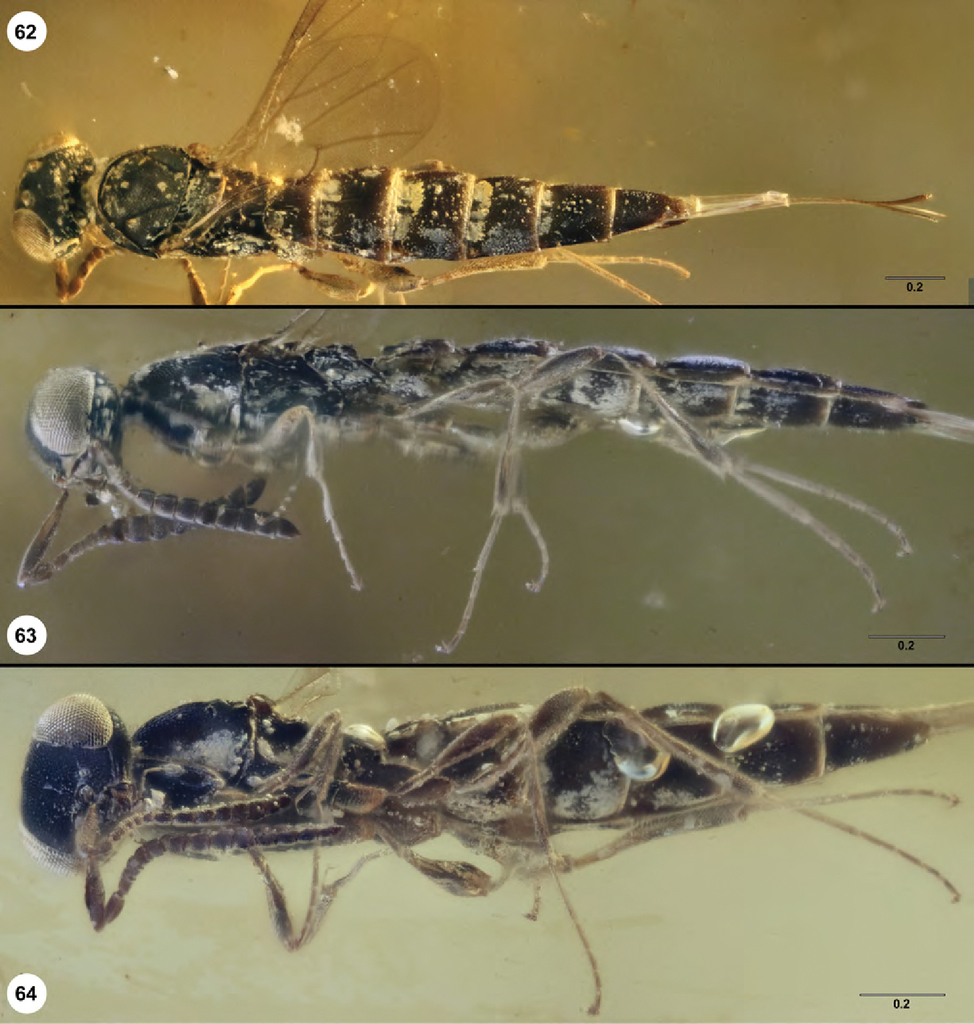
Proterosceliopsis wingerathi

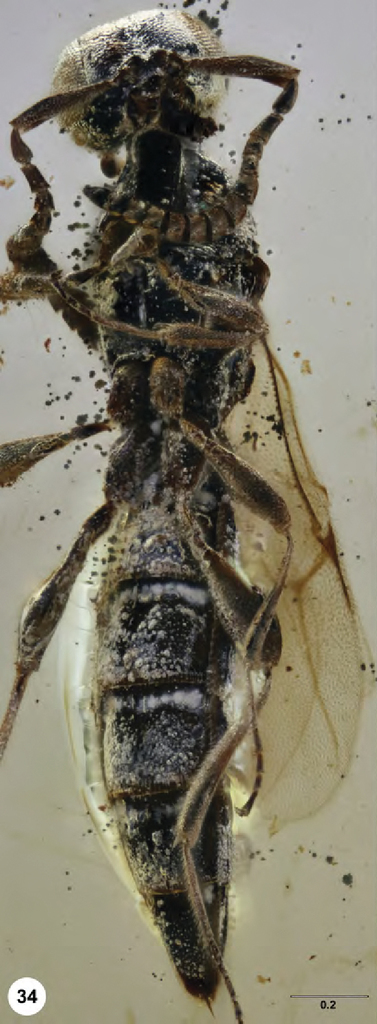
Proterosceliopsis nigon

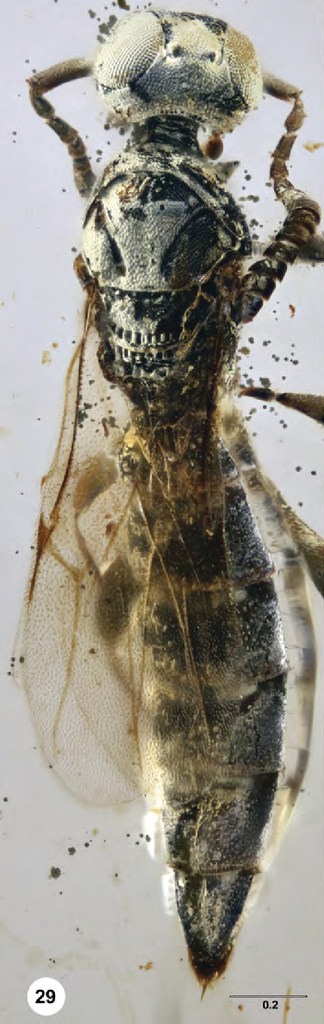
Proterosceliopsis nigon
