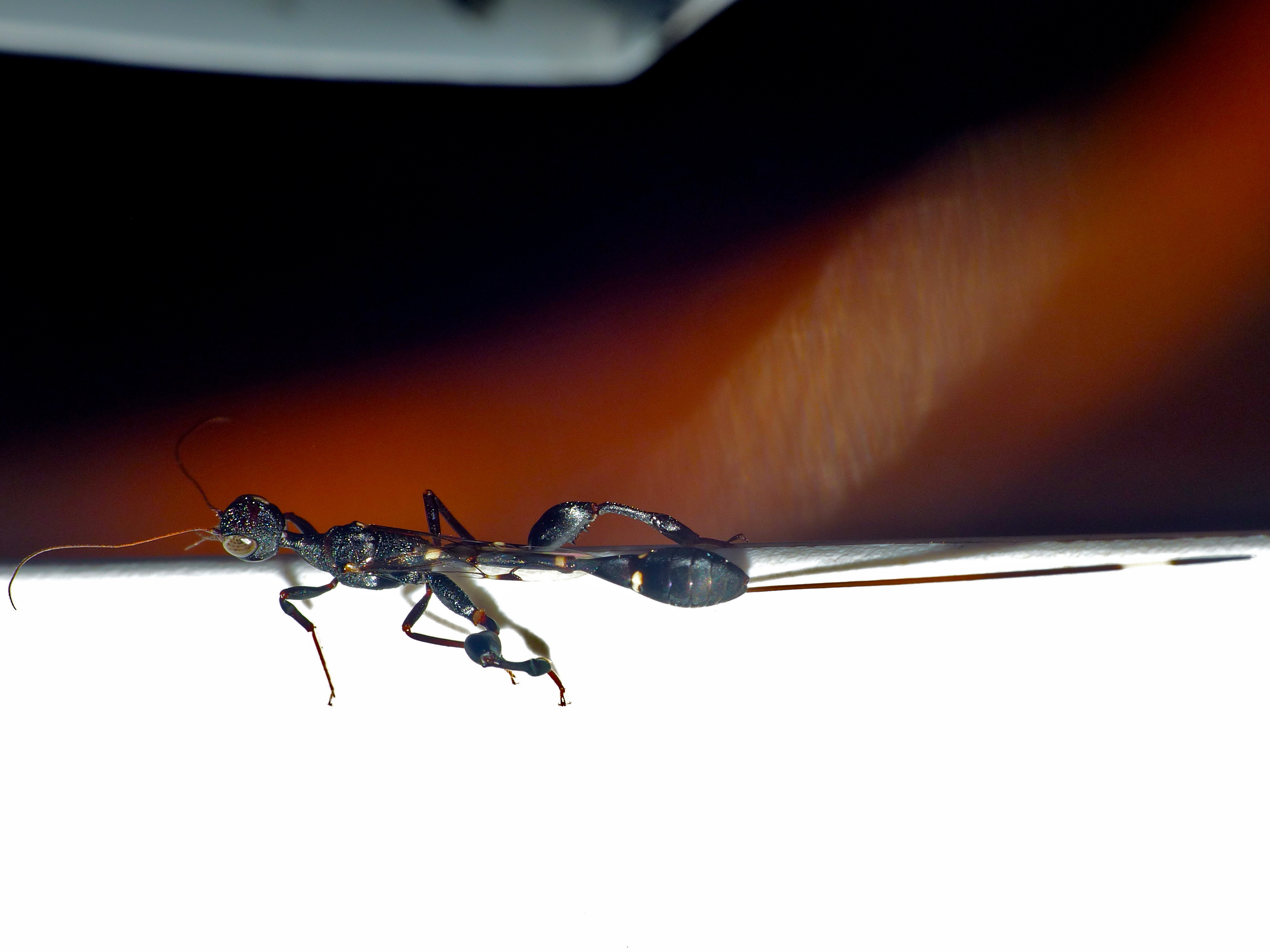
- Foenatopus albomaculatus
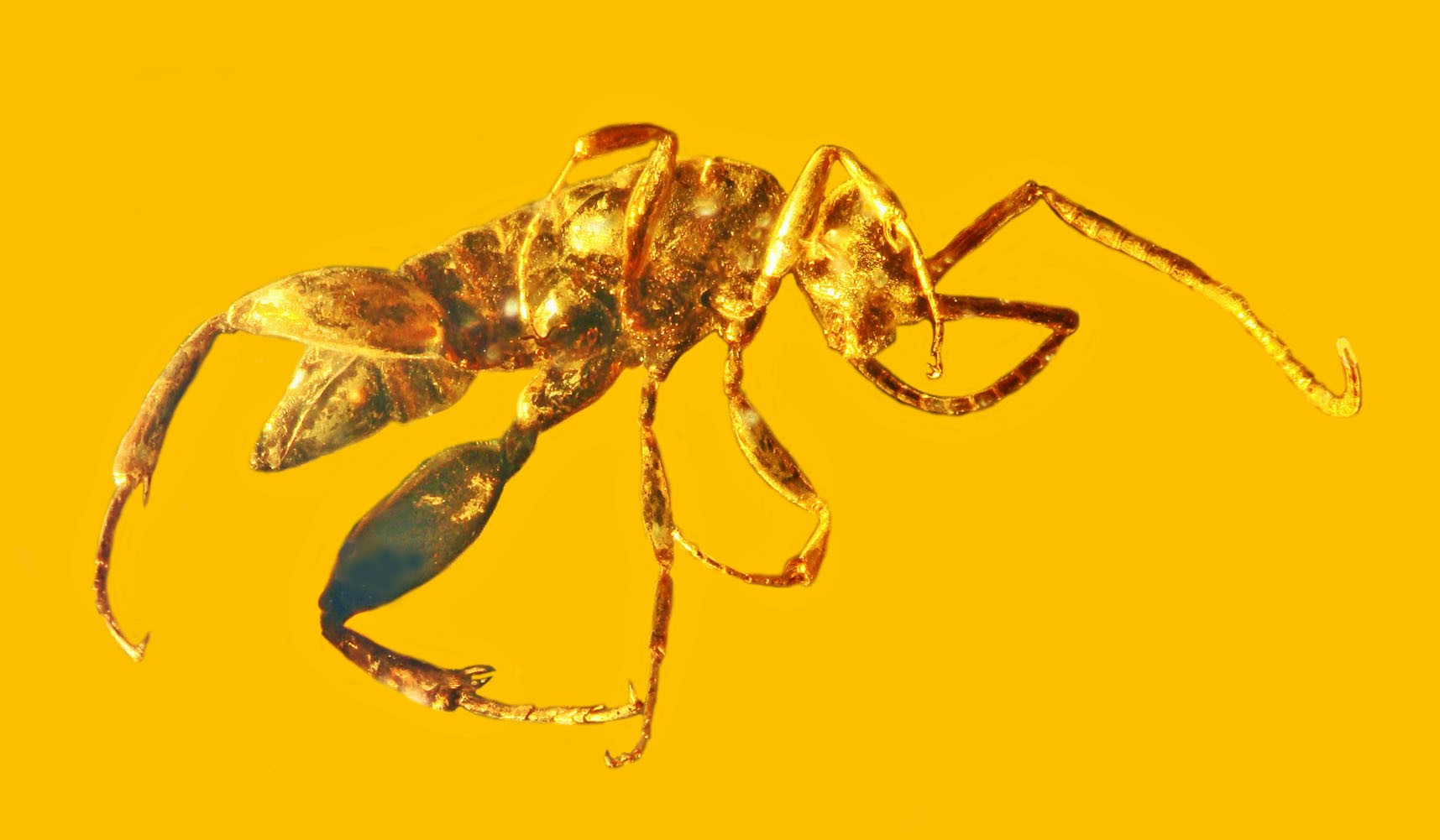
- Aptenoperissus burmanicus

Scientific classification
- Kingdom: Animalia
- Phylum: Arthropoda
- Clade: Pancrustacea
- Class: Insecta
- Order: Hymenoptera
- Suborder: Apocrita
- Superfamily: Stephanoidea; Leach, 1815

Families
- Stephanidae; †Ephialtitidae; †Aptenoperissidae; †Myanmarinidae; †Ohlhoffiidae

= Stephanoidea =

Stephanoidea Temporal range: Early Jurassic–Recent

Superfamily of wasps

Stephanoidea is a superfamily of parasitic wasps within the Apocrita; it includes only one living family, Stephanidae (350 living species mid Cretaceous-recent), as well as the extinct families Ephialtitidae (89 species, Early Jurassic-mid Cretaceous), Aptenoperissidae (8 species, mid Cretaceous, Burmese amber), Myanmarinidae (4 species, mid Cretaceous, Burmese amber) and Ohlhoffiidae (4 species, Early-mid Cretaceous).
