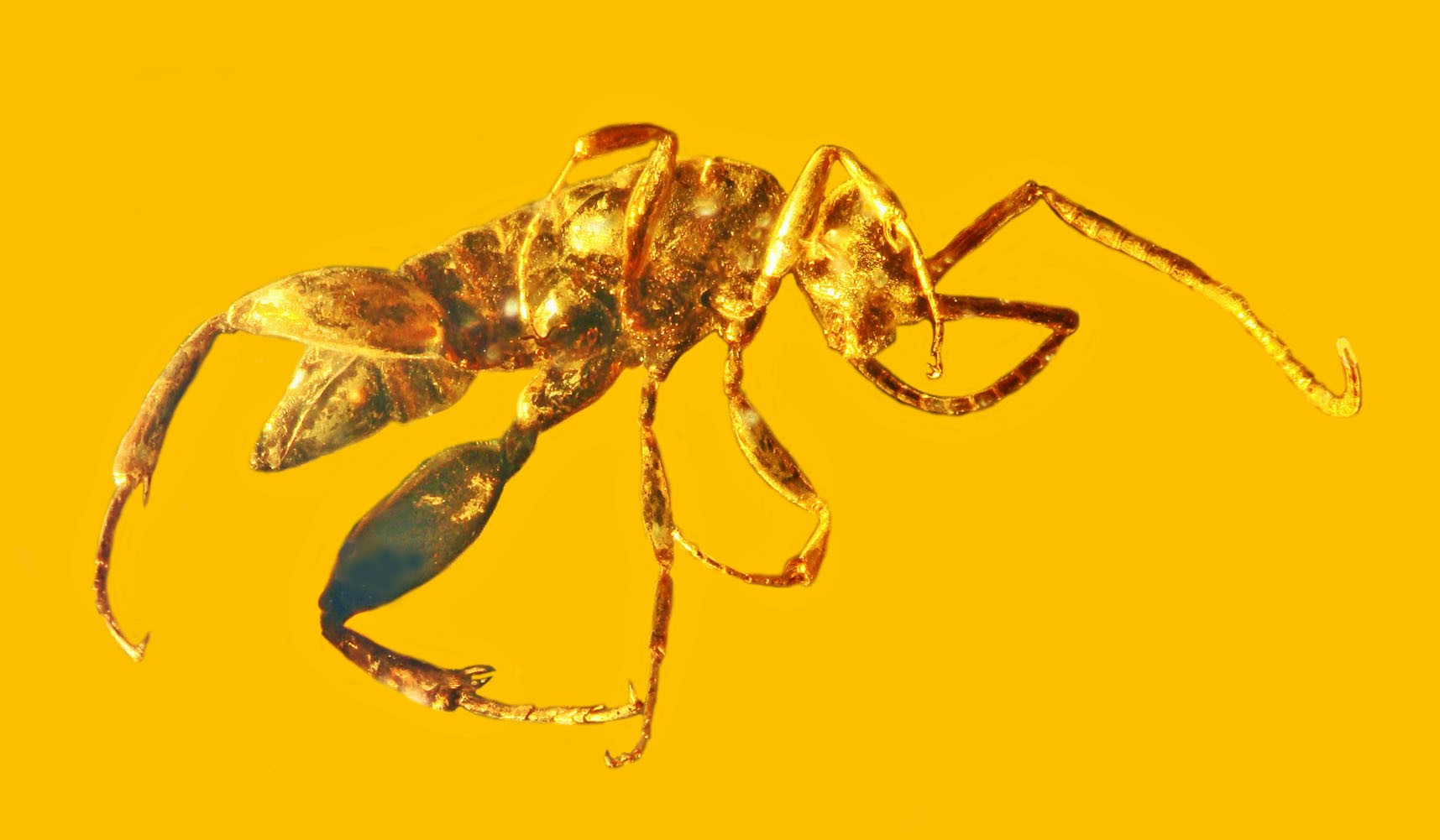
- Aptenoperissus burmanicus holotype

Scientific classification
- Kingdom: Animalia
- Phylum: Arthropoda
- Clade: Pancrustacea
- Class: Insecta
- Order: Hymenoptera
- Suborder: Apocrita
- Superfamily: Stephanoidea
- Family: †Aptenoperissidae; Rasnitsyn et al., 2017
- Genus: †Aptenoperissus; Rasnitsyn et al., 2017

Type species
- †Aptenoperissus burmanicus Rasnitsyn et al., 2017

Species
- †A. burmanicus †A. amabilis †A. delicatus †A. formosus †A. etius †A. magnifemoris †A. pusillus

= Aptenoperissus =

Aptenoperissus Temporal range: Cenomanian

Extinct genus of wasps

Aptenoperissus is a genus of extinct wasp with eight described species, placed into the monotypic family Aptenoperissidae. The type species Aptenoperissus burmanicus resembles a mix between a grasshopper, an ant, and a wasp. It was described by a group of researchers from Oregon State University in a paper released online in October 2016. The piece of 100 million year old Burmese amber that it was preserved in was found in the Hukawng Valley of Myanmar in Southern Asia. A new family, Aptenoperissidae, was described to accommodate this insect. Species of Aptenoperissus were wingless, with a strong stinger. The creature had long legs making it capable of jumping higher than most insects. Subsequently additional species were described from the Myanmar amber: A. amabilis, A. delicatus, A. formosus, A. etius, A. magnifemoris, A. pusillus and A. zonalis. Initially placed in Ceraphronoidea, later studies placed it in Stephanoidea.
