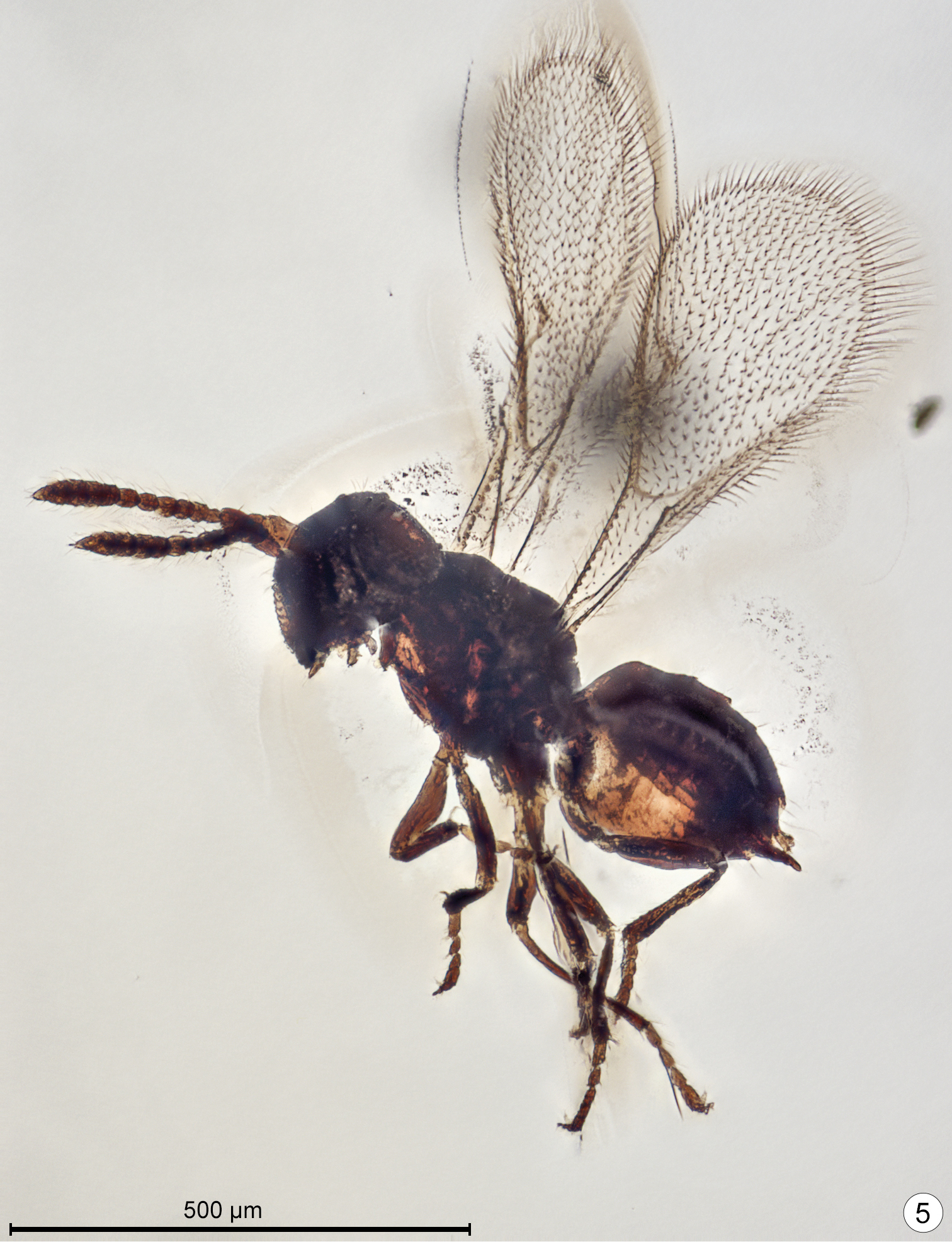
- Baeomorpha liorum Male
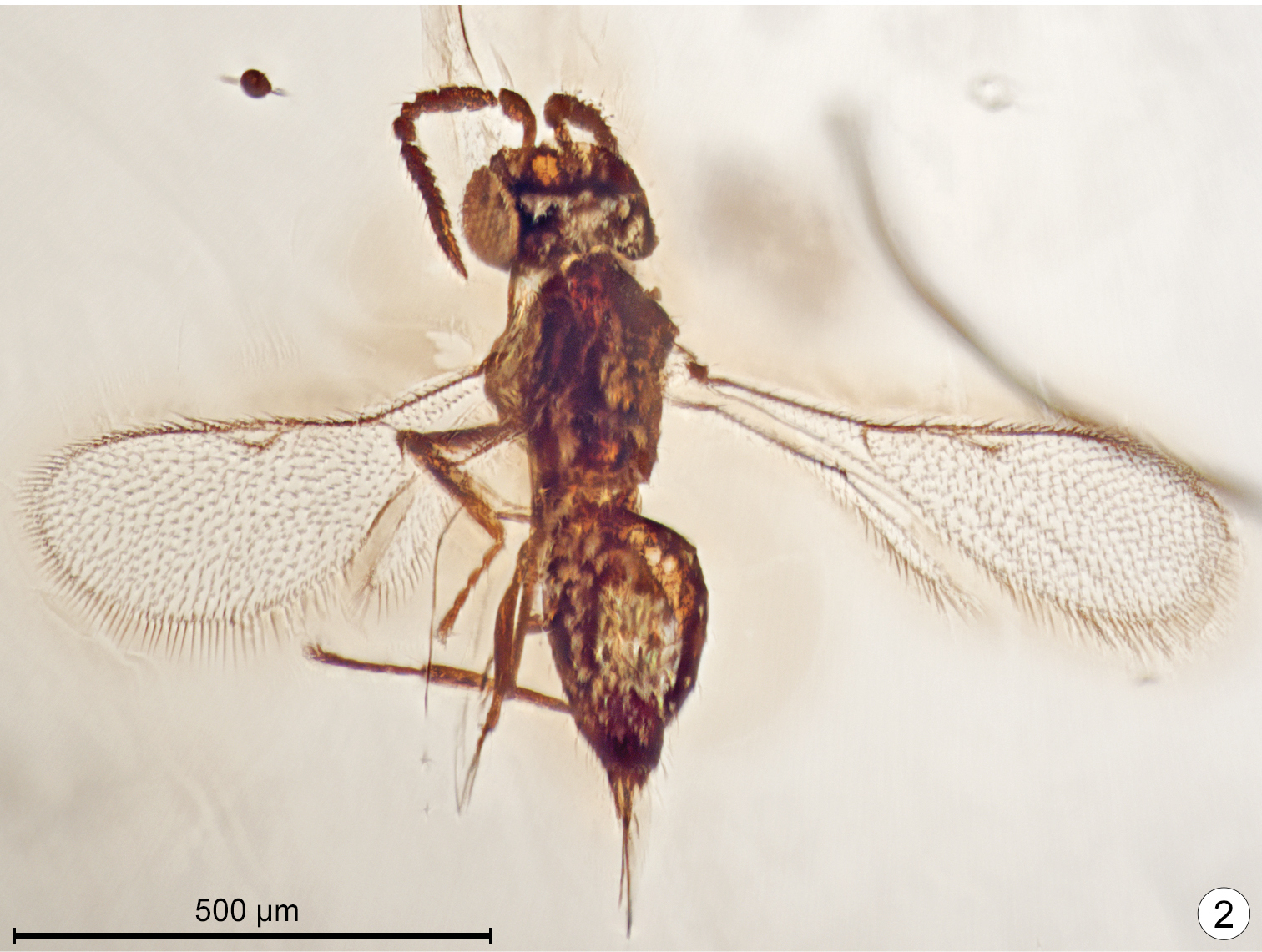
- Baeomorpha liorum Female

Scientific classification
- Domain: Eukaryota
- Kingdom: Animalia
- Phylum: Arthropoda
- Class: Insecta
- Order: Hymenoptera
- Superfamily: Chalcidoidea
- Family: Baeomorphidae; Yoshimoto, 1975

Genera and species
- †Baeomorpha Brues, 1937; Chiloe micropteron Gibson & Huber, 2000; Rotoita basalis Bouček & Noyes, 1987; †Taimyromorpha Gumovsky, 2017

Synonyms
- Rotoitidae Bouček & Noyes, 1987

= Baeomorphidae =

Baeomorphidae Temporal range: Cenomanian–Recent

Family of wasps

The Baeomorphidae (formerly known as Rotoitidae), are a very small family of rare, relictual parasitic wasps in the superfamily Chalcidoidea, known primarily from fossils (14 extinct species in two genera, Baeomorpha and Taimyromorpha). Only two extant species are known, each in its own genus, one from New Zealand and one from Chile, and little is known about their biology, though there is suspicion that they are parasitoids of the relictual true bug family Peloridiidae.

Females of the Chilean species, Chiloe micropteron, have their wings reduced to tiny bristles. Most fossil species are known from the Late Cretaceous (Santonian) Taimyr amber of Russia and Late Cretaceous (Campanian) Canadian amber, but one species, Baeomorpha liorum is known from the mid Cretaceous (late Albian-earliest Cenomanian) Burmese amber.

Baeomorphids are very close to the base of the chalcidoid family tree, presently considered to be the first "branch" taxon after the Mymaridae.
