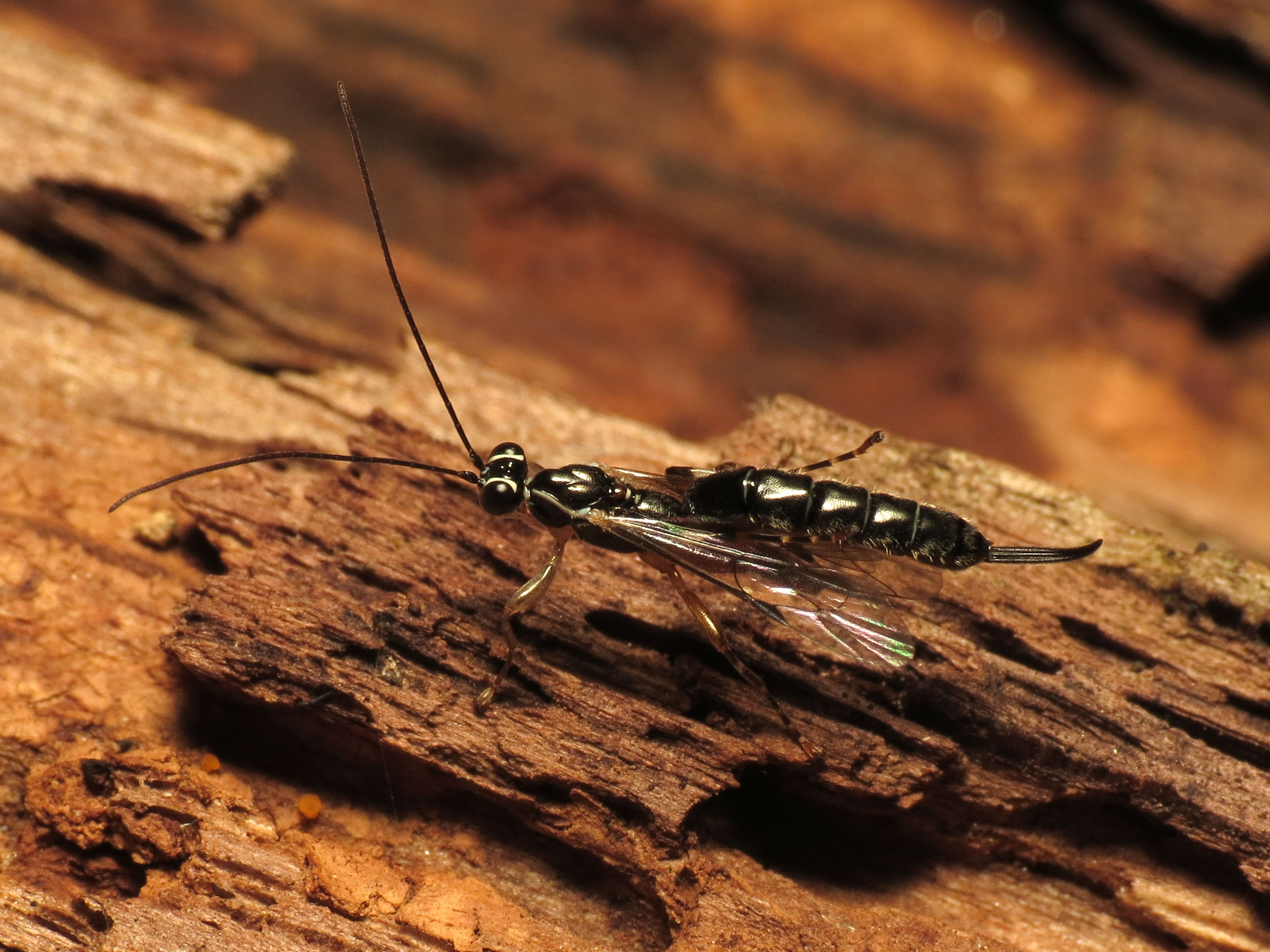
- Clistopyga recurva

Scientific classification
- Domain: Eukaryota
- Kingdom: Animalia
- Phylum: Arthropoda
- Class: Insecta
- Order: Hymenoptera
- Family: Ichneumonidae
- Tribe: Ephialtini
- Genus: Clistopyga; Gravenhorst, 1829

= Clistopyga =

Genus of wasps

Clistopyga is a genus of ichneumon wasps in the family Ichneumonidae. There are at least 30 described species in Clistopyga.

== Species ==
As of 2018, approximately fifty Clistopyga species have been described, thirty of which are found in the Neotropical region. Species include:

- Clistopyga africana Benoit, 1956^{c g}
- Clistopyga albovittata Bordera, Palacio & Martinez, 2019
- Clistopyga alutaria Townes, 1960^{c g}
- Clistopyga amazonica Bordera & Sääksjärvi, 2016^{g}
- Clistopyga arctica Kusigemati, 1985^{c g}
- Clistopyga atrata Cushman, 1921^{c g}
- Clistopyga calixtoi Gauld, 1991^{c g}
- Clistopyga canadensis Provancher, 1880^{c g}
- Clistopyga caramba Castillo & Saaksjarvi, 2015^{g}
- Clistopyga carvajali Gauld, Ugalde & Hanson, 1998^{c g}
- Clistopyga chaconi Gauld, 1991^{c g}
- Clistopyga crassicaudata Sääksjärvi, Bordera & Palacio 2018
- Clistopyga diazi Porter, 1979^{c g}
- Clistopyga eldae Gauld, 1991^{c g}
- Clistopyga emphera Kusigemati, 1985^{c g}
- Clistopyga fernandezi Gauld, 1991^{c g}
- Clistopyga henryi Gauld, 1991^{c g}
- Clistopyga incitator (Fabricius, 1793)^{c g}
- Clistopyga jakobii Graf, 1985^{c g}
- Clistopyga laevis Kasparyan, 1981^{c g}
- Clistopyga lapacensis Bordera, Palacio & Martinez, 2019
- Clistopyga latifrontalis (Uchida, 1941)^{c g}
- Clistopyga linearis (Wollaston, 1858)^{c g}
- Clistopyga longifemoralis Varga & Reshchikov^{g}
- Clistopyga lopezrichinii (Blanchard, 1941)^{c g}
- Clistopyga maculifrons Cushman, 1921^{c g}
- Clistopyga manni Cushman, 1921^{c g}
- Clistopyga moraviae Gauld, Ugalde & Hanson, 1998^{c g}
- Clistopyga nagatomii Kusigemati, 1985^{c g}
- Clistopyga nigrifrons Cushman, 1921^{c g}
- Clistopyga plana Morley, 1914^{c g}
- Clistopyga recurva (Say, 1835)^{c g b}
- Clistopyga rufator Holmgren, 1856^{c g}
- Clistopyga rugulosa Kusigemati, 1985^{c g}
- Clistopyga sauberi Brauns, 1898^{c g}
- Clistopyga speculata Bordera, Palacio & Martinez, 2019
- Clistopyga stanfordi Gauld, 1991^{c g}
- Clistopyga sziladyi Kiss, 1959^{c g}

Data sources: i = ITIS, c = Catalogue of Life, g = GBIF, b = Bugguide.net
