= Clistopyga crassicaudata =

Scientific classification
- Domain: Eukaryota
- Kingdom: Animalia
- Phylum: Arthropoda
- Class: Insecta
- Order: Hymenoptera
- Family: Ichneumonidae
- Genus: Clistopyga
- Species: C. crassicaudata

Binomial name
- Clistopyga crassicaudata Sääksjärvi et al., 2018

Species of wasp

Clistopyga crassicaudata is a species of ichneumonid wasp in the subfamily Pimplinae which was first described in 2018. It is found in Peru and was one of seven new species found in a narrow zone of vegetation between the Amazon rainforest and the Andes.

== Description and identification ==
Among the Clistopyga isayae species group, C. crassicaudata is distinguished by apical thickening of the ovipositor's upper valve. The ovipositor sheath is around 2.4 times the hind tibial length (about 4.6 mm long) and is weakly upcurved at the apex. The head is blackish-brown with the front orbits and mandibles white. The thorax is predominantly orange, and the propodeum and gaster are predominantly reddish-brown. The legs are white with reddish-brown markings.
