= Liassocupes =

Liassocupes Temporal range: Sinemurian

Scientific classification
- Domain: Eukaryota
- Kingdom: Animalia
- Phylum: Arthropoda
- Class: Insecta
- Order: Coleoptera
- Family: Ommatidae
- Genus: †Liassocupes; Zeuner 1962
- Species: †L. parvus

Binomial name
- †Liassocupes parvus Zeuner 1962

Extinct genus of beetles

Liassocupes is an extinct genus of ommatid beetle from the Jurassic period of England. The only included species is Liassocupes parvus. It is known from compression fossils found at Flatstones near Charmouth in the Sinemurian aged part of the Charmouth Mudstone Formation, Dorset. Other species previously assigned to the genus include Liassocupes (?) maculatus described by Whalley in 1985 from the same locality, but this was subsequently suggested by Ponomarenko to belong to either Omma or Tetraphalerus and was considered to belong to the genus Brochocoleus by Kirejtshuk (2020). Another species Liassocupes (?) giganteus also described by Whalley (1985) from the same locality, was found to be a member of the genus Mimemala in the extinct family Schizocoleidae.
