= Brochocoleus =

Brochocoleus Temporal range: Sinemurian–Turonian

Scientific classification
- Kingdom: Animalia
- Phylum: Arthropoda
- Clade: Pancrustacea
- Class: Insecta
- Order: Coleoptera
- Family: Ommatidae
- Genus: †Brochocoleus; Y.C. Hong, 1982

Extinct genus of beetles

Brochocoleus is an extinct genus of beetles in the family Ommatidae, known from the Early Jurassic to the Early Late Cretaceous. 10 species are currently recognised, with many species being reassigned to other genera by Kirejtshuk's major systematic revision in 2020.

- †Brochocoleus alatus Ponomarenko, 1994 – Ulan-Argalant Formation, Mongolia, Barremian
- †Brochocoleus cossiphus Ponomarenko, 1994 – Dzun-Bain Formation, Mongolia, Aptian
- †Brochocoleus keenani Jarzembowski et al., 2013 – Weald Clay, United Kingdom, Barremian
- †Brochocoleus maculatus (Whalley, 1985) – Charmouth Mudstone Formation, United Kingdom, Sinemurian
- †Brochocoleus maximus Jarzembowski et al., 2013 – Purbeck Group, United Kingdom, Berriasian
- †Brochocoleus planus Ponomarenko, 1994 – Dzun-Bain Formation, Mongolia, Aptian
- †Brochocoleus punctatus Hong, 1982 (type species) – Chijinbao Formation, China, Aptian
- †Brochocoleus rostratus Ponomarenko, 1999 – Kzyl-Zhar, Kazakhstan, Turonian
- †Brochocoleus sacheonensis Lee et al., 2023 – Jinju Formation, South Korea, Albian
- †Brochocoleus sonidensis Tang et al., 2024 – Damoguaihe Formation, China, Early Cretaceous
- †Brochocoleus tobini Jarzembowski et al., 2013 – Weald Clay, United Kingdom, Hauterivian

== Formerly assigned species ==
- †Brochocoleus angustus Tan, Ren, & Shih, 2007 – Moved to Pareuryomma
- †Brochocoleus aphaleratus (Ponomarenko, 1969) – Moved to Allophalerus
- †Brochocoleus applanatus Tan & Ren, 2009 – Moved to Diluticupes
- †Brochocoleus caseyi Jarzembowski, Wang, & Zheng, 2016 – Moved to Jarzembowskiops
- †Brochocoleus crowsonae Jarzembowski, Yan, Wang, & Zhang, 2013 – Moved to Diluticupes
- †Brochocoleus impressus (Ren, 1995) – Moved to Diluticupes
- †Brochocoleus indibili Soriano & Delclòs, 2006 – Considered indeterminate by Kirejtshuk, 2020
- †Brochocoleus magnus Tan & Ren, 2009 – Moved to Diluticupes
- †Brochocoleus minor Ponomarenko, 2000 – Moved to Diluticupes
- †Brochocoleus sulcatus Tan, Ren, & Shih, 2007 – Moved to Odontomma
- †Brochocoleus validus Tan & Ren, 2009 – Moved to Diluticupes
- †Brochocoleus yangshuwanziensis Jarzembowski, Yan, Wang, & Zhang, 2013 – Moved to Diluticupes
- †Brochocoleus zhiyuani Liu, Tan, Jarzembowski, Wang, Ren, & Pang, 2017 – Moved to Burmocoleus
