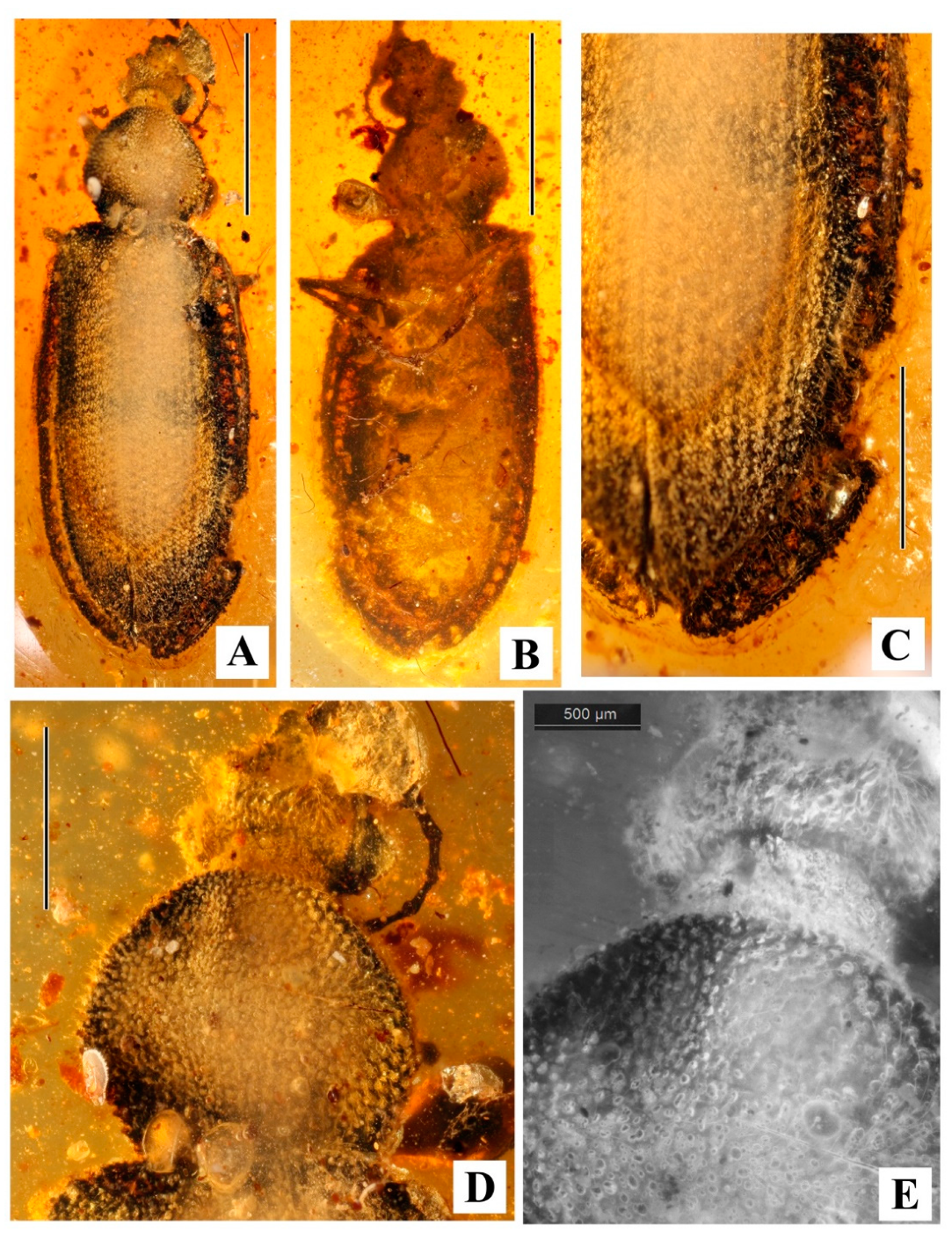
- Polyakius alberti

Scientific classification
- Domain: Eukaryota
- Kingdom: Animalia
- Phylum: Arthropoda
- Class: Insecta
- Order: Coleoptera
- Family: Ommatidae
- Genus: †Polyakius; Kirejtshuk, 2020

Species
- †Polyakius alberti Kirejtshuk, 2020; †Polyakius pubescens Kirejtshuk, 2020

= Polyakius =

Polyakius Temporal range: Cenomanian

Extinct genus of beetles

Polyakius is an extinct genus of archostematan beetle belonging to the family Ommatidae. It is known from two species found in Cenomanian aged Burmese amber. It is considered to be a close relative of Omma.
