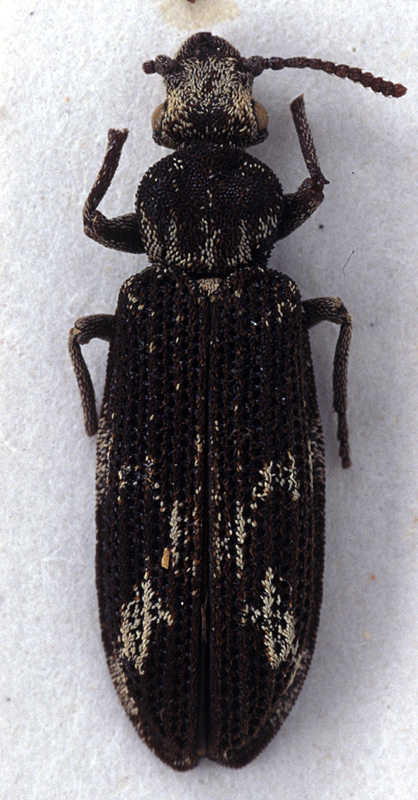
- Beutelius sagitta

Scientific classification
- Kingdom: Animalia
- Phylum: Arthropoda
- Clade: Pancrustacea
- Class: Insecta
- Order: Coleoptera
- Family: Ommatidae
- Genus: Beutelius; Escalona et al., 2020

= Beutelius =

Genus of beetles

Beutelius is a small genus of ommatid beetles native to Australia. It is only one of three extant genera in the family, alongside Tetraphalerus and Omma. It currently contains four species, three of which were originally assigned to Omma, and it is distinguished from Omma by the presence of flattened, ribbed scales covering most areas, as well as longer maxillary and labial palps, and an anteriorly depressed gulamentum.

== Species ==
- Beutelius mastersi (MacLeay, 1871) – inland New South Wales and Queensland
- Beutelius reidi Escalona et al., 2020 – northwest New South Wales
- Beutelius rutherfordi (Lawrence, 1999) – Mallee Woodlands and Shrublands
- Beutelius sagitta (Neboiss, 1989) – Mallee Woodlands and Shrublands
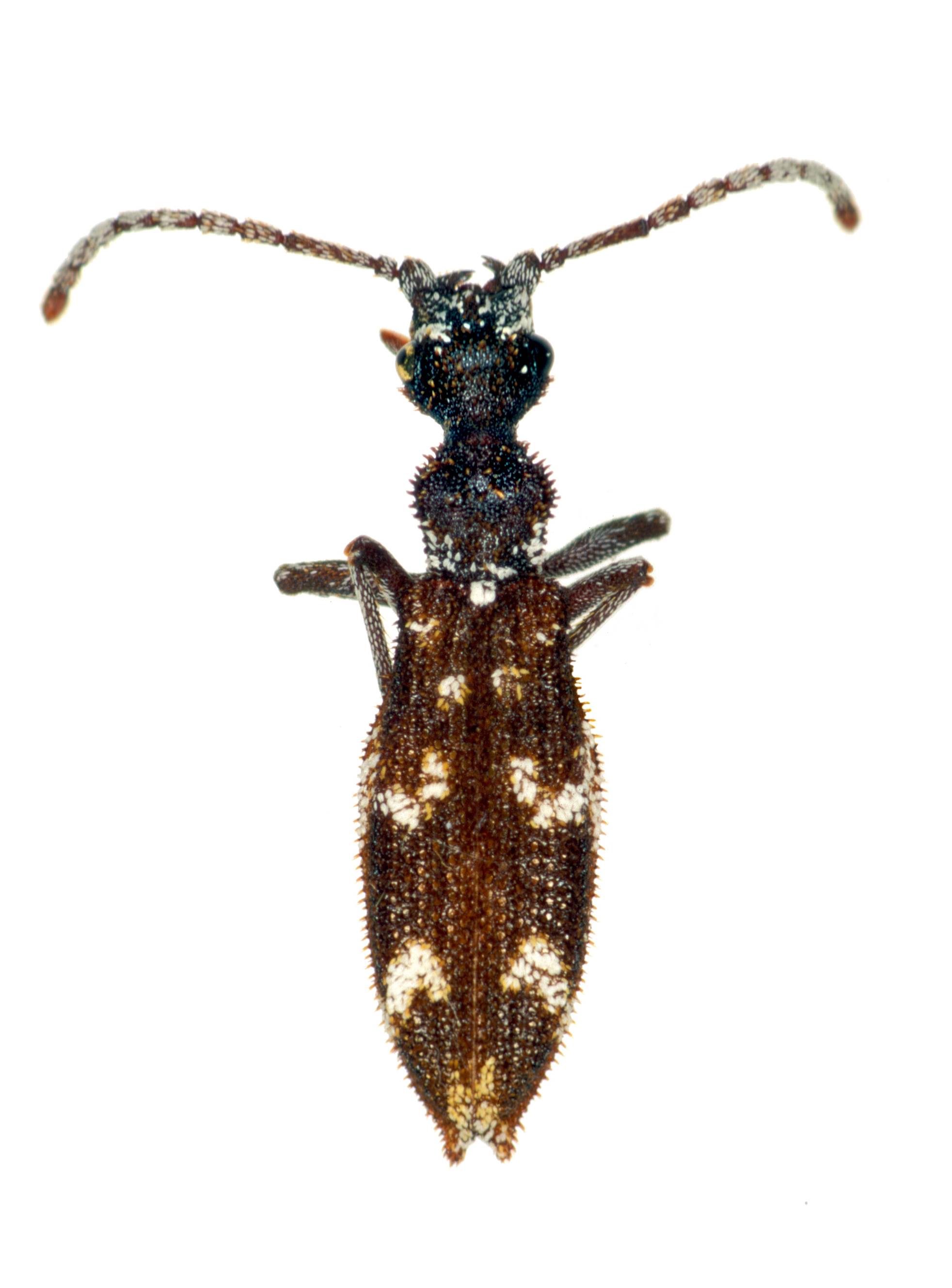
Beutelius rutherfordi
