= Weald Clay =

Geological formation in England

- Stratigraphic range: Hauterivian-Barremian, 136–125 Ma
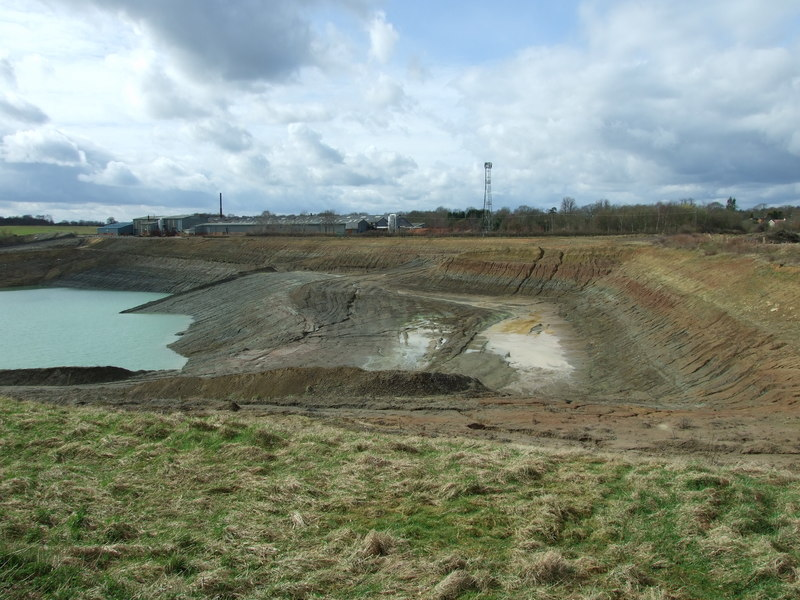
- Weald Clay exposed at Clock House Brickworks
- Type: Geological formation
- Unit of: Wealden Group
- Sub-units: Horsham Stone Member
- Underlies: Atherfield Clay Formation
- Overlies: Tunbridge Wells Sand Formation
- Thickness: up to 460 m

Lithology
- Primary: Shale, Mudstone
- Other: Siltstone, Sandstone, Limestone, Ironstone

Location
- Region: England
- Country: United Kingdom

Type section
- Named for: Weald
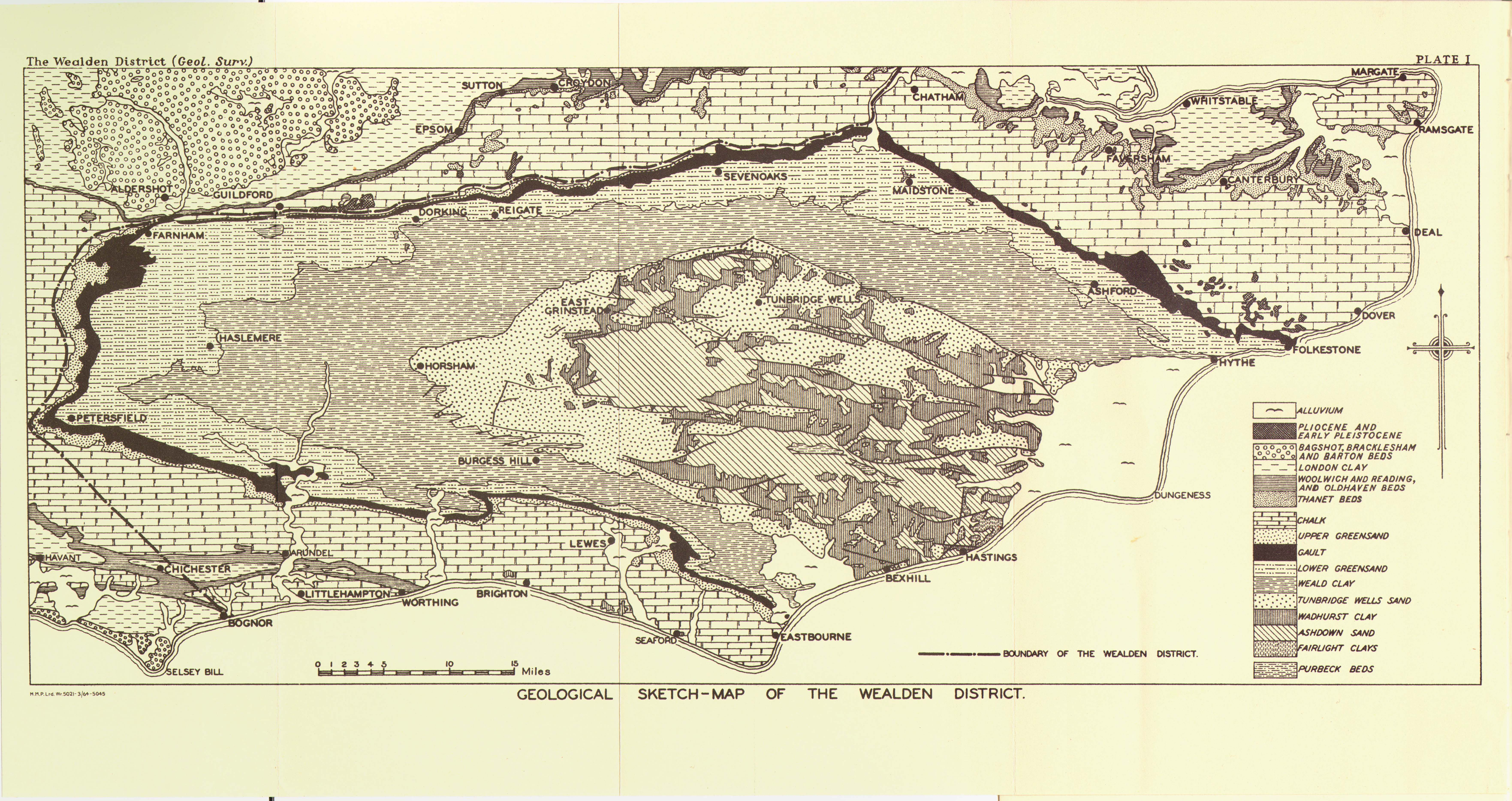
- Extent of the Weald Clay within the Weald Basin, shown with horizontal lines

Weald Clay or the Weald Clay Formation is a Lower Cretaceous sedimentary rock unit underlying areas of South East England, between the North and South Downs, in an area called the Weald Basin. It is the uppermost unit of the Wealden Group of rocks within the Weald Basin, and the upper portion of the unit is equivalent in age to the exposed portion of the Wessex Formation on the Isle of Wight. It predominantly consists of thinly bedded mudstone. The un-weathered form is blue/grey, and the yellow/orange is the weathered form, it is used in brickmaking.

The formation was deposited in lagoonal, lacustrine and alluvial conditions that varied from freshwater to brackish. The climate at the time of deposition is thought to have been semi-arid, and prone to fire. The clay alternates with other subordinate lithologies, notably hard red-weathering beds of ironstone, limestone (Sussex Marble) and sandstones, notably including the calcareous sandstone unit referred to as the Horsham Stone. It has a gradual, conformable contact with the underlying Tunbridge Wells Sand Formation, and has a sharp, unconformable contact with the overlying Atherfield Clay Formation, a shallow marine unit deposited after marine transgression during the Aptian.

== Physical properties ==
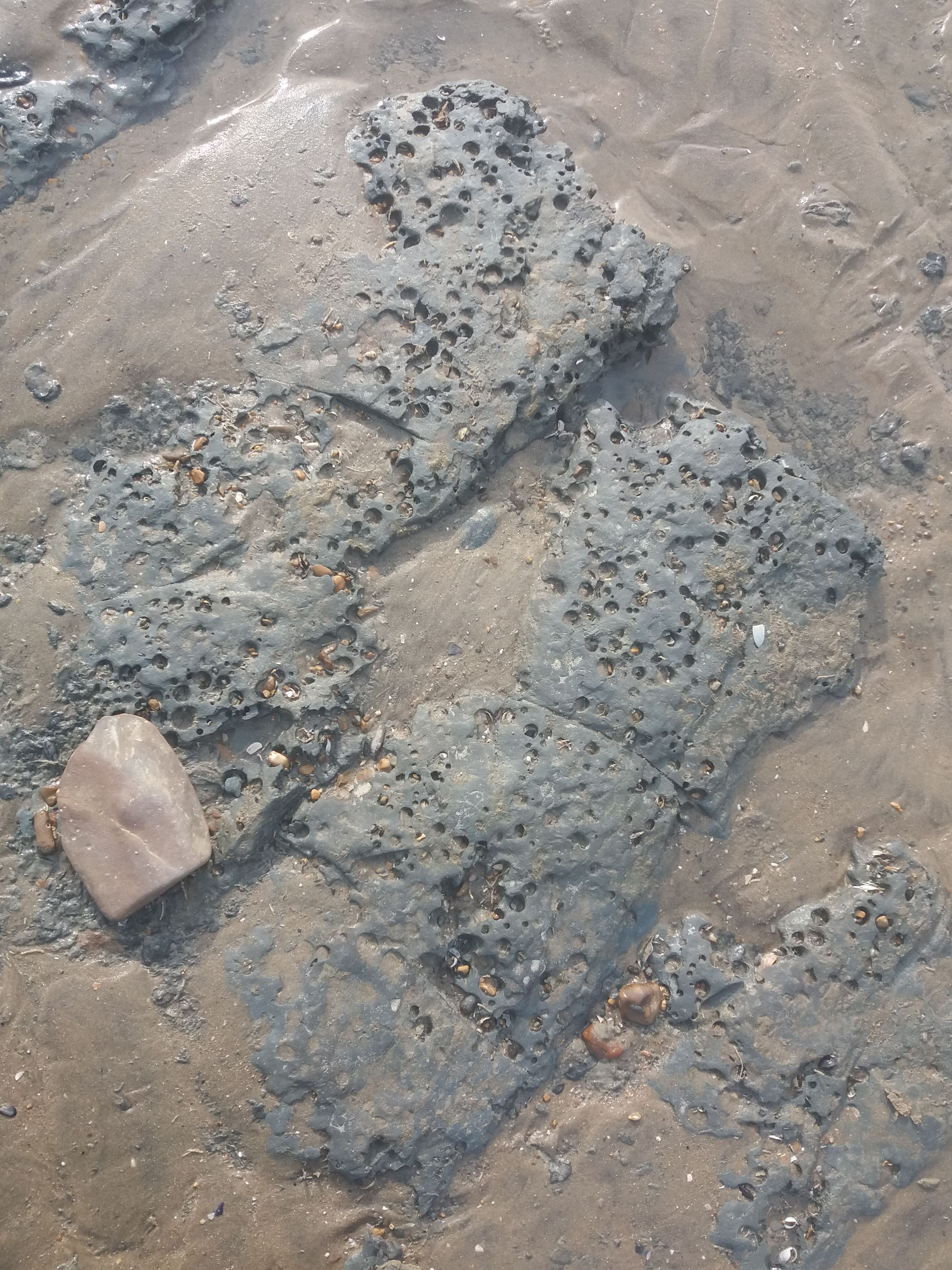
Bored exposure of the lower Weald Clay on the shore near Cooden Beach

The weathered and unweathered forms of the Weald Clay have different physical properties. Blue looks superficially like a soft slate, is quite dry and hard and will support the weight of buildings quite easily. Because it is quite impermeable, and so dry, it does not get broken by tree roots. It is typically found at 750mm down below a layer of yellow clay. Yellow, found on the surface, absorbs water quite readily so becomes very soft in the winter. The two different types make quite different bricks.

== Paleofauna ==
=== Vertebrates ===
==== Amphibians ====
Amphibians reported from the Weald Clay
Genus	Species	Location	Stratigraphic position	Material	Notes	Images
Anura	Indeterminate	Keymer Tile Works	Lower	Maxillary fragment		
Urodela	Indeterminate	Keymer Tile Works	Lower	Atlas vertebra	Has been suggested to have a close relationship with Balveherpeton from Germany.	

==== Dinosaurs ====
Dinosaurs reported from the Weald Clay
Genus	Species	Location	Stratigraphic position	Material	Notes	Images
Baryonyx	B. walkeri	Smokejack Clay Pit	Upper Weald Clay	Multiple partial skulls, one of which had an associated postcranial skeleton.	A spinosaurid	
Horshamosaurus	H. rudgwickensis	Rudgwick Brickworks	Upper Weald Clay	"Vertebrae, partial fore and hindlimbs, osteoderms."	A dubious genus of nodosaurid ankylosaur belonging to Polacanthinae. Originally named as a species of Polacanthus.	
Paludohadros	P. proudlovii	Smokejack Clay Pit	Upper Weald Clay	Partial skull and skeleton	A hadrosauroid ornithopod dinosaur. Occurrences of Iguanodon or Mantellisaurus from this locality mentioned in older literature actually represent this taxon.	
Valdosaurus	V. canaliculatus	Heathfield	Lower Weald Clay		A dryosaurid, also known from the Wessex Formation	
Wyleyia	W. valdensis	West Sussex				
Sauropoda	Indeterminate	Smokejacks, Bexhill				

==== Other reptiles ====
Other reptiles reported from the Weald Clay
Genus	Species	Location	Stratigraphic position	Material	Notes	Images
Dorsetisaurus	Indeterminate	Keymer Tile Works				
Leptocleidus	L. superstes			NHM R4828 (holotype)	Pliosauroid	

=== Invertebrates ===
Numerous insect species are known from several localities in the Weald Clay, including Rudgwick Brickworks, Auclaye Brickworks, Smokejacks and Clockhouse Brickworks

Invertebrates reported from the Weald Clay
Genus	Species	Location	Stratigraphic position	Material	Notes	Images
Principiala	P. rudgwickensis	Rudgwick Brickworks	Upper Weald Clay	Single partial fore-wing	An Ithonidae lacewing, the second in Principiala	
Englathauma	E. crabbi	Rudgwick Brickworks	Upper Weald Clay	BMB 021962/3 almost complete forewing	A englathaumatid scorpionfly	
Englathauma	E. mellishae	Smokejacks	Upper Weald Clay	Wing and wing fragments	A englathaumatid scorpionfly	
Cretophasmomima	C. traceyae	Smokejacks	Upper Weald Clay	Forewing	A stick insect	
Valdicossus	V. mikewebsteri	Smokejacks	Upper	Hindwing	A member of Palaeontinidae	
Valdicossus	V. chesteri	Cooden Beach	Lower	Hindwing	A member of Palaeontinidae	
Ilerdocossus	I. prowsei	Clockhouse Brickworks	Lower		A member of Palaeontinidae	
Proraphidia	P. hopkinsi	Clockhouse Brickworks	Lower		A member of Mesoraphidiidae	
Turanophlebia	T. anglicana	Clockhouse Brickworks	Lower		Dragonfly, member of Tarsophlebiidae	
Brochocoleus	B. keenani B. tobini	Smokejacks	Upper		Member of Ommatidae	
Diluticupes	D. crowsonae	Smokejacks	Upper		Member of Ommatidae	
Zygadenia	Z. tuberculata, Z. angliae	Smokejacks	Upper		Member of Ommatidae	
Cionocoleus	C. elizabethae, C. watsoni C. minimus	Smokejacks	Upper		Member of Ommatidae	
Omma	O. elongatum	Keymer Tile Works	Lower		Member of Ommatidae	

== Flora ==
Plants reported from the Weald Clay
Genus	Species	Location	Stratigraphic position	Material	Notes	Images
Weichselia	W. reticulata				A tree fern	
Brachyphyllum					Conifer leaves	
Pagiophyllum					Conifer leaves	
Pseudofrenelopsis	P. parceramosa				A conifer belonging to the extinct family Cheirolepidiaceae	

== See also ==
- Wealden District
- London Clay
- Oxford Clay
- List of dinosaur-bearing rock formations
