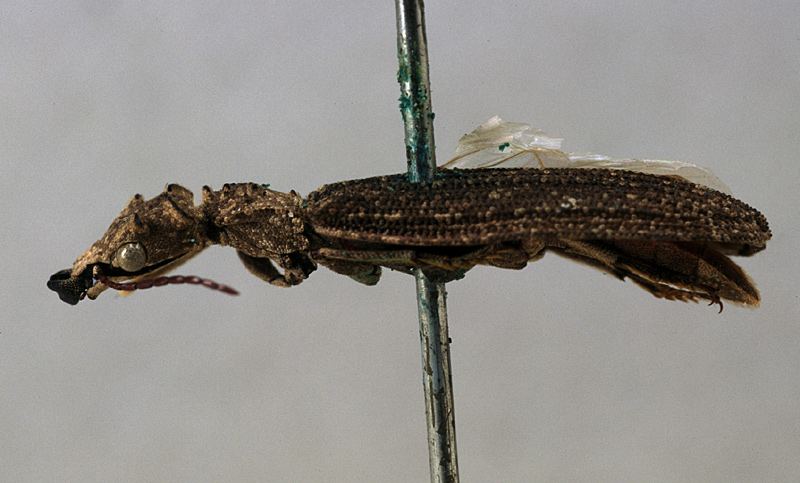

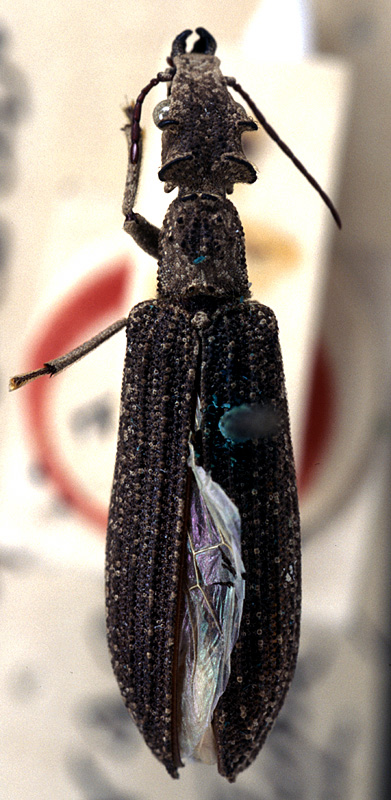
- Tetraphalerus wagneri in side (top) and dorsal (bottom) view

Scientific classification
- Kingdom: Animalia
- Phylum: Arthropoda
- Clade: Pancrustacea
- Class: Insecta
- Order: Coleoptera
- Family: Ommatidae
- Genus: Tetraphalerus; Waterhouse, 1901

Type species
- Tetraphalerus wagneri Waterhouse, 1901

= Tetraphalerus =

Tetraphalerus Temporal range: Early Jurassic–Present

Genus of beetles

Tetraphalerus is a genus of beetles in the family Ommatidae, It is currently known from two extant species native to South America and several fossil species from the Jurassic and Cretaceous of Eurasia, as well as the Cretaceous of South America.

== Systematics ==
=== Living species ===
- Tetraphalerus bruchi Heller, 1913 – recent, Northern Argentina
- Tetraphalerus wagneri Waterhouse, 1901 – recent, South America

=== Extinct species ===
Taxa labelled (?) are considered questionable by Kirejtshuk, 2020

- (?)†Tetraphalerus brevis Ponomarenko, 1964 – Karabastau Formation, Kazakhstan, Late Jurassic (Oxfordian)
- (?)†Tetraphalerus collaris Ponomarenko, 1997 – Dzun-Bain Formation, Mongolia, Early Cretaceous (Aptian)
- (?)†Tetraphalerus glabratus Ponomarenko, 1997 – Togo-Khuduk Formation, Mongolia, Middle Jurassic (Bajocian/Bathonian)
- (?)†Tetraphalerus mongolicus Ponomarenko, 1986 – Gurvan-Eren Formation, Mongolia, Aptian
- (?)†Tetraphalerus notatus Ponomarenko, 1997 – Dzun-Bain Formation, Mongolia, Aptian
- †Tetraphalerus largicoxa Lin, 1986 – Guanyintan Formation, China, Early-Middle Jurassic (Toarcian/Aalenian)
- †Tetraphalerus vetustus Biffi, Lepeco, & Beutel. 2026 – Crato Formation, Brazil, Aptian
- †Tetraphalerus penalveri Soriano & Delclòs, 2006 – La Pedrera de Rúbies Formation, Spain, Early Cretaceous (Barremian)
- †Tetraphalerus ponomarenkoi Soriano & Delclòs, 2006 – La Huérguina Formation, Spain, Barremian

== Formerly assigned species ==
- †Tetraphalerus antiquus Ponomarenko, 1964 – assigned to Allophalerus
- †Tetraphalerus bontsaganensis Ponomarenko, 1997 – assigned to Allophalerus
- †Tetraphalerus brevicapitis Pononarenko & Martinez-Delclos, 2000 – considered indeterminate by Kirejtshuk, 2020
- †Tetraphalerus fentaiensis (Ren, 1995) – assigned to Monticupes
- †Tetraphalerus grandis Ponomarenko, 1964 – assigned to Omma
- †Tetraphalerus incertus Ponomarenko, 1969 – assigned to Allophalerus
- †Tetraphalerus laetus Lin, 1976 – assigned to Notocupes
- †Tetraphalerus latus Tan et al. 2007 – assigned to Allophalerus
- †Tetraphalerus lindae Jarzembowski et al. 2017 – assigned to Bukhkalius
- †Tetraphalerus longicollis Ponomarenko, 1997 – assigned to Omma
- †Tetraphalerus maximus Ponomarenko, 1968 – assigned to Allophalerus
- †Tetraphalerus okhotensis Ponomarenko in Cromov et al., 1993 – assigned to Allophalerus
- †Tetraphalerus oligocenicus (Crowson, 1962) – assigned to Tetraphalerites
- †Tetraphalerus tenuipes Ponomarenko, 1964 – assigned to Allophalerus
- †Tetraphalerus verrucosus Ponomarenko, 1966 – assigned to Allophalerus
- †Tetraphalerus surrectus (Ren, 1995) – assigned to Monticupes
