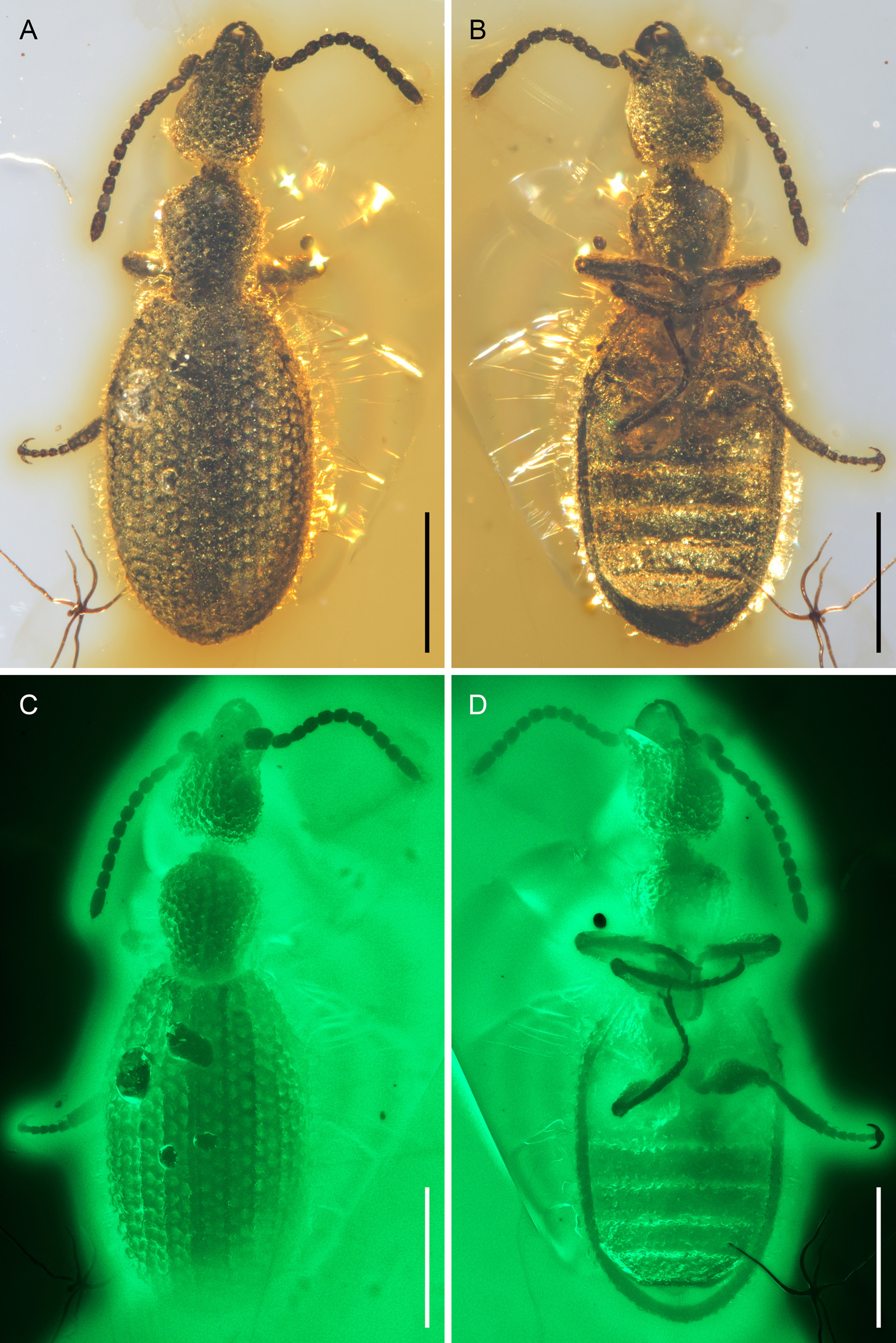
- Miniomma chenkuni under normal and fluorescent light

Scientific classification
- Domain: Eukaryota
- Kingdom: Animalia
- Phylum: Arthropoda
- Class: Insecta
- Order: Coleoptera
- Family: Ommatidae
- Genus: †Miniomma; Li, Yamamoto & Cai, 2020
- Species: †M. chenkuni

Binomial name
- †Miniomma chenkuni Li, Yamamoto & Cai, 2020

= Miniomma =

Miniomma Temporal range: Cenomanian

Extinct genus of beetles

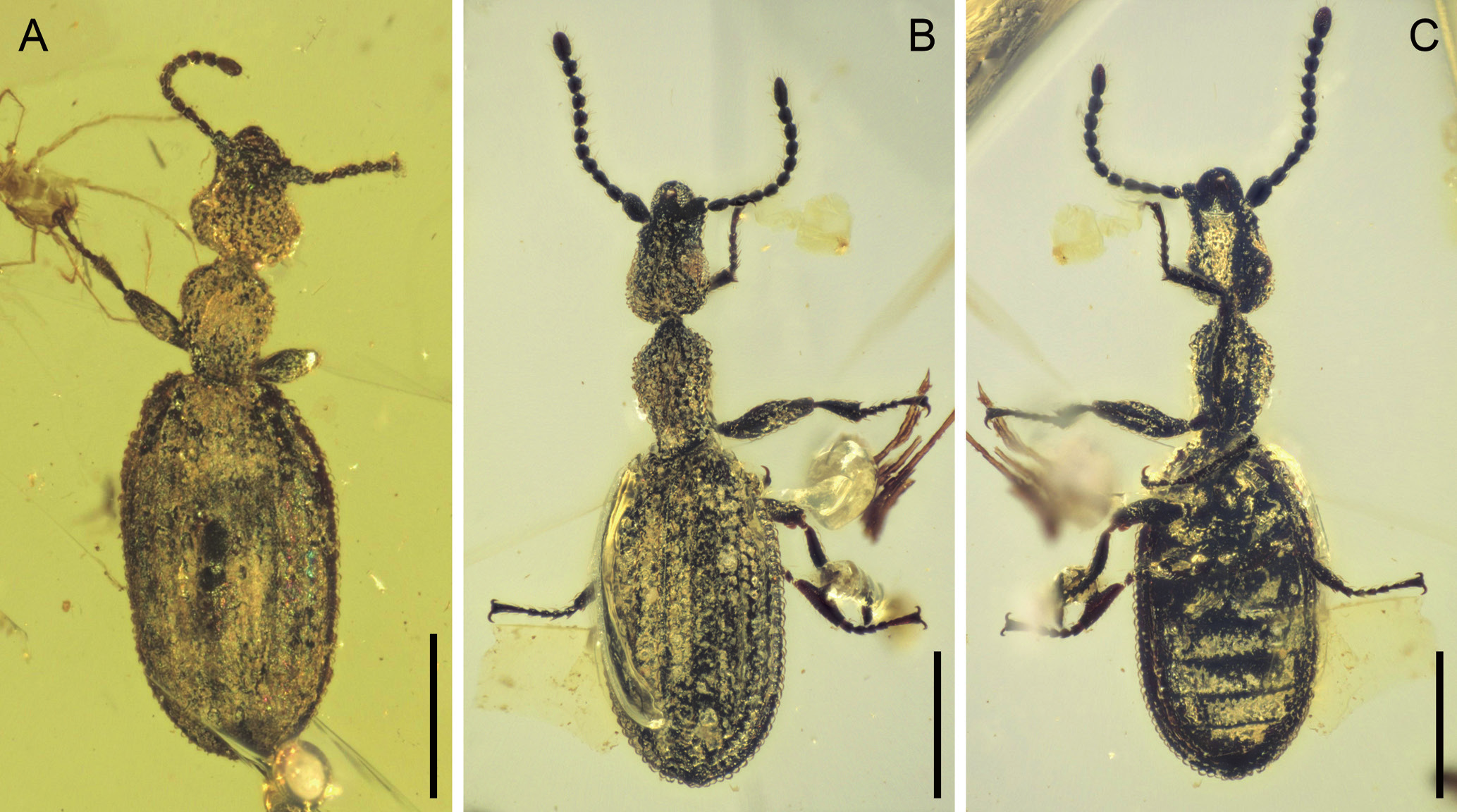
Paratypes

Miniomma is an extinct genus of ommatid beetle. It is known from a single species, Miniomma chenkuni, from the Cenomanian aged Burmese amber from Myanmar. The species is the smallest known ommatid, at less than 2 mm long, compared to Omma, which ranges in length from 6 to 26 mm.
