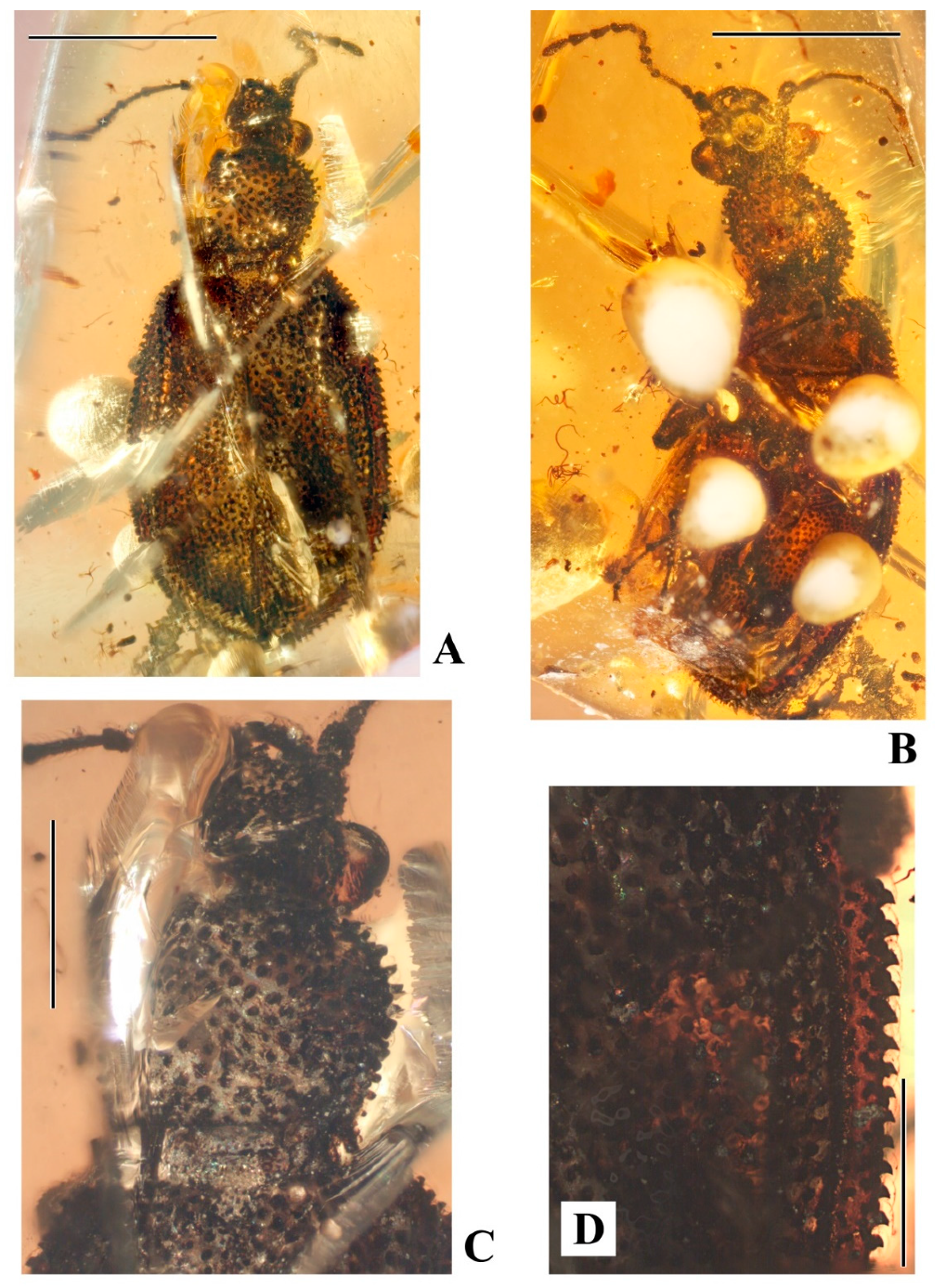

Scientific classification
- Domain: Eukaryota
- Kingdom: Animalia
- Phylum: Arthropoda
- Class: Insecta
- Order: Coleoptera
- Family: Ommatidae
- Genus: †Cionocups; Kirejtshuk 2020
- Species: †C. manukyani

Binomial name
- †Cionocups manukyani Kirejtshuk 2020

= Cionocups =

Cionocups manukyani Temporal range: Cenomanian

Extinct genus of beetles

Cionocups is an extinct genus of ommatid beetle. It is known from a single species, Cionocups manukyani, found in Cenomanian aged Burmese amber from Myanmar. It was originally considered to be closely related to the genus Cionocoleus, but it is considered a junior synonym of Omma by some subsequent authors.
