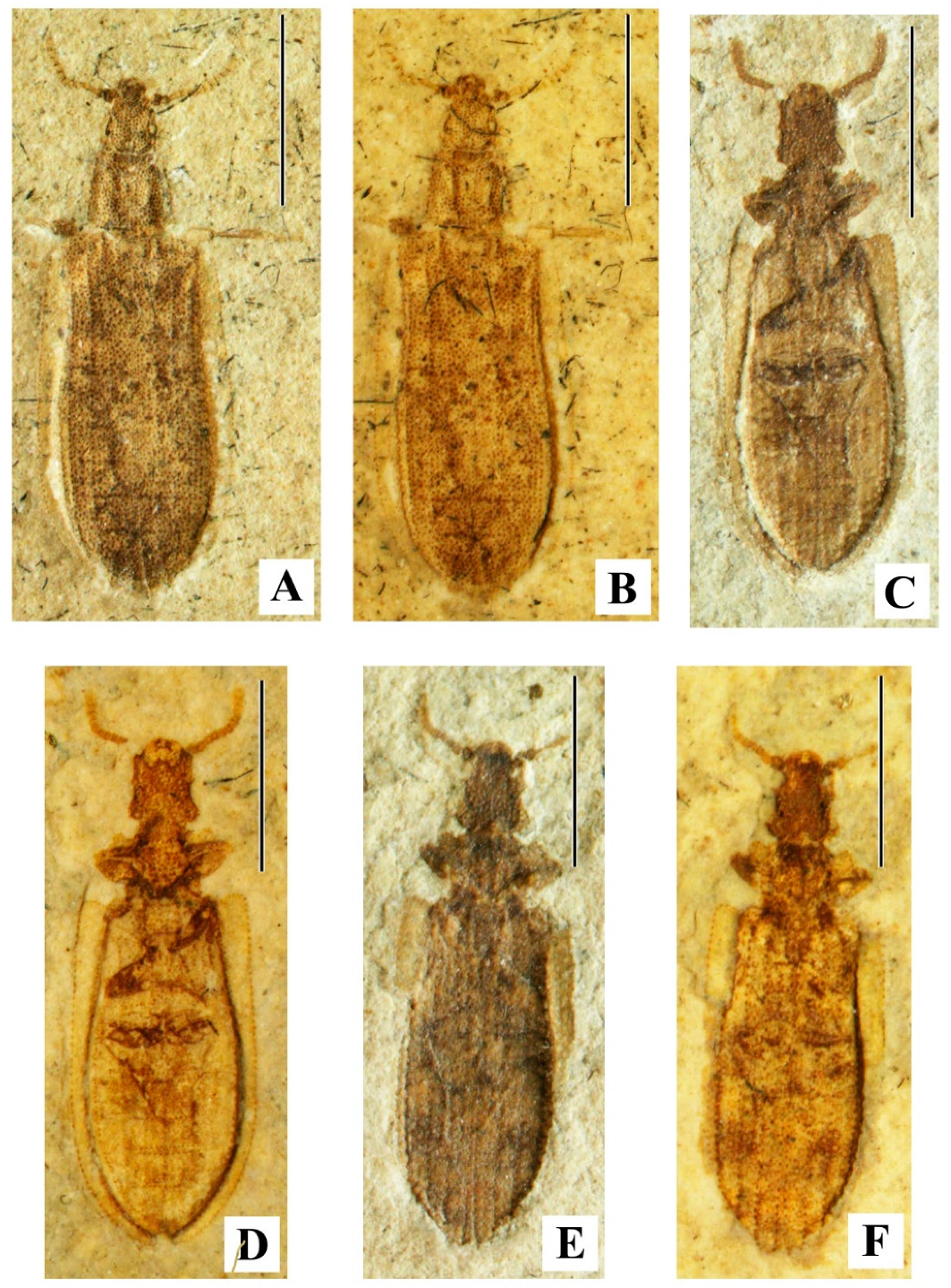
- Pareuryomma angustum (top left, centre) and Pareuryomma tylodes (top right, bottom)

Scientific classification
- Domain: Eukaryota
- Kingdom: Animalia
- Phylum: Arthropoda
- Class: Insecta
- Order: Coleoptera
- Family: Ommatidae
- Genus: †Pareuryomma; Tan et al., 2012

Species
- †Pareuryomma angustum (Tan et al. 2007); †Pareuryomma cardiobasis Tan et al. 2012; †Pareuryomma tylodes (Tan et al. 2006)

Synonyms
- Euryomma Tan et al. 2006 (nec Stein, 1899)

= Pareuryomma =

Pareuryomma Temporal range: Aptian

Extinct genus of beetles

Pareuryomma is an extinct genus of ommatid beetle. It is known from three species, P. angustum, P. cardiobasis and P. tylodes, all known from the Aptian aged Yixian Formation of China. The genus was first described in 2012, and formerly included the species Pareuryomma ancistrodonta from the Middle Jurassic Jiulongshan Formation, China, which was transferred to the genus Omma in 2020. The species P. angustum was formerly thought to be part of Brochocoleus. The genus is characterised by "slender body, long and subparallelsided or slightly narrowed head with moderately prominent eyes and more or less prominent temples, narrow pronotum with more or less explanate lateral carinae, elytra with the veins more or less well expressed and independently ending on Sc, large cells more or less arranged in rows on disc and moderately widely explanate sides of the elytra, and abdominal ventrites co-planar."
