= Stegocoleus =

Stegocoleus Temporal range: Cenomanian

Scientific classification
- Kingdom: Animalia
- Phylum: Arthropoda
- Class: Insecta
- Order: Coleoptera
- Family: Ommatidae
- Genus: †Stegocoleus; Jarzembowski and Wang, 2016

Species
- †Stegocoleus arkonus Tihelka et al., 2019; †Stegocoleus caii Jarzembowski and Wang, 2016; †Stegocoleus lawrencei Tihelka et al., 2019

Extinct genus of beetles

Stegocoleus is an extinct genus of ommatid beetle. Its distinctive morphology includes a distinctive flat rim on the outer edge of the elytra similar to those of Burmocoleus and Jarzembowskiops, but is distinguished from those genera by a distinctive prothorax. It is known from 3 species found in Cenomanian aged Burmese amber.
