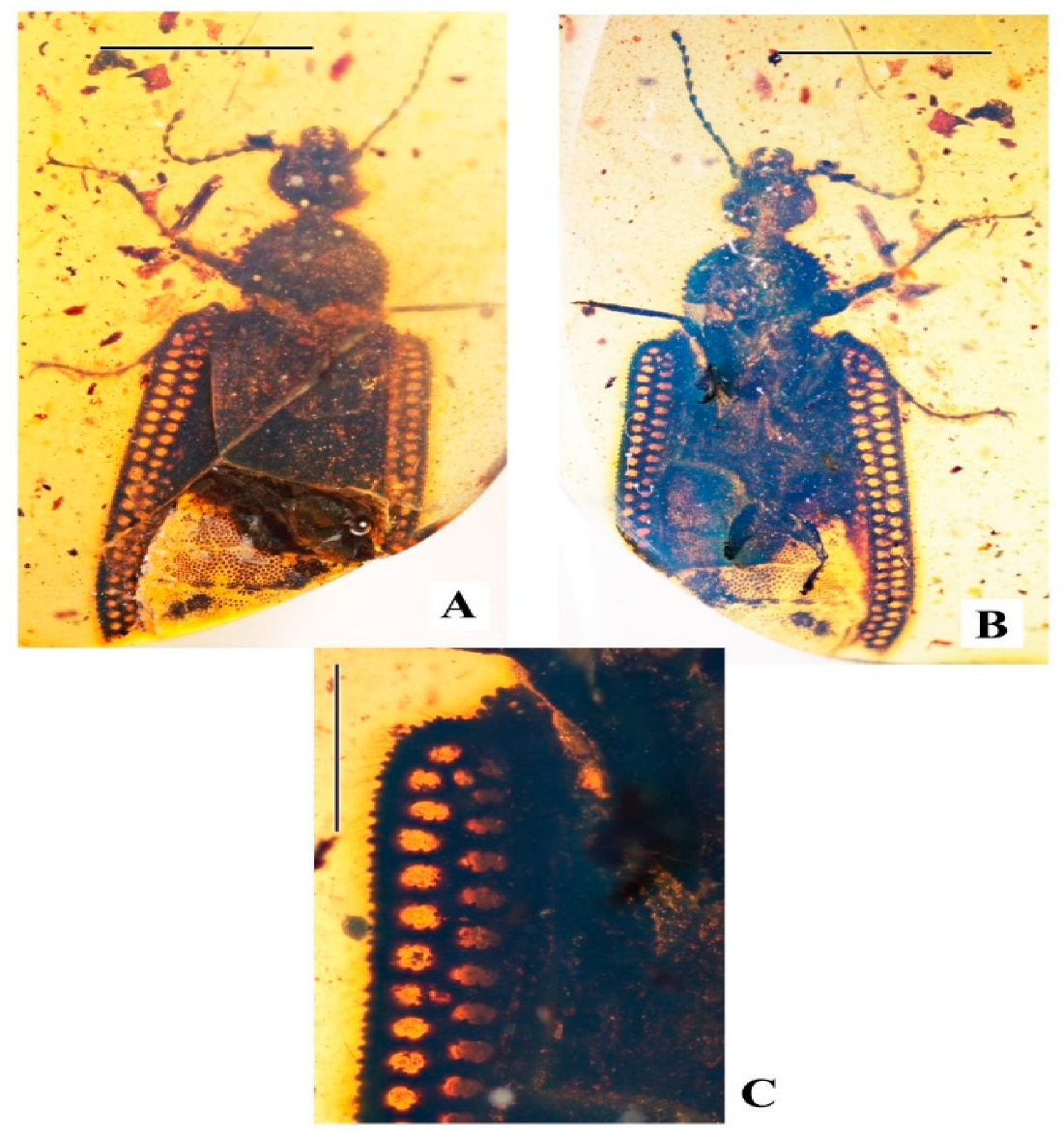
- Burmocoleus prisnyi

Scientific classification
- Domain: Eukaryota
- Kingdom: Animalia
- Phylum: Arthropoda
- Class: Insecta
- Order: Coleoptera
- Family: Ommatidae
- Genus: †Burmocoleus; Kirejtshuk, 2020

Species
- †B. zhiyuani (Liu et al., 2017); †B. prisnyi Kirejtshuk, 2020

= Burmocoleus =

Burmocoleus Temporal range: Cenomanian

Extinct genus of beetles

Burmocoleus is an extinct genus of archostematan beetle belonging to the family Ommatidae. It is known from two species, Burmocoleus zhiyuani, which was initially assigned to the genus Brochocoleus. This species was placed into the new genus Burmocoleus by Kirejtshuk, 2020, who also described a new species, Burmocoleus prisnyi. Both species are known from the Cenomanian aged Burmese amber from Myanmar. Similar to Stegocoleus, Brochocoleus and Jarzembowskiops it has flat, wide elytral edges, but can be distinguished from these genera in several characters, and is more similar to other ommatids in the characters of the prothorax.
