= Clock House Brickworks =

Protected area in Surrey, England

Coordinates: 51.135°N 0.321°W

- Site of Special Scientific Interest
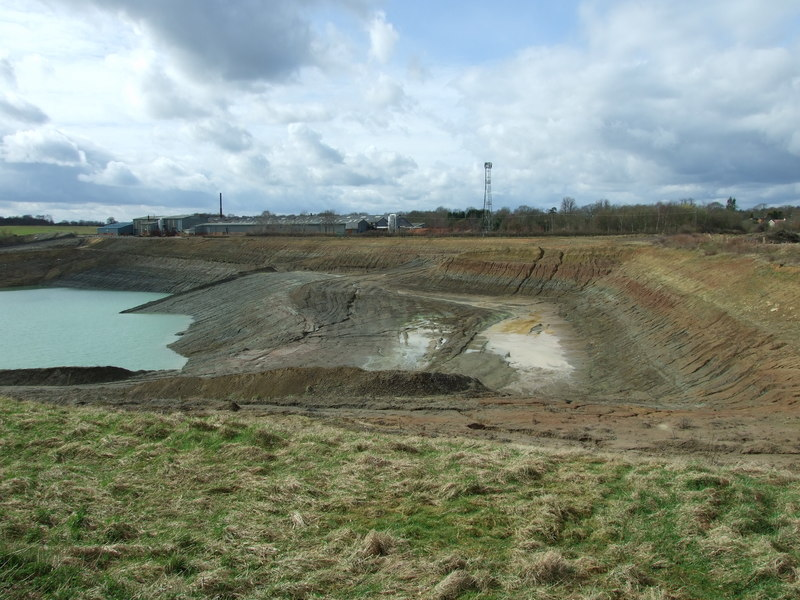
- Location of Clock House Brickworks.
- Area of search: Surrey
- Grid reference: TQ 176 386
- Interest: Geological
- Area: 35.9 hectares (89 acres)
- Notification date: 1992
- Location map: Magic Map

Clock House Brickworks is a 35.9-hectare (89-acre) geological Site of Special Scientific Interest south of Capel in Surrey. It is a Geological Conservation Review site.

The pit exposes temperate and subtropical palaeoenvironments of the Lower Cretaceous Weald Clay Group. The site is particularly important for its several thousand fossil insects, including the first described social insect, a termite. There are also aquatic plants, fish and reptiles.

The site is private land with no public access.
