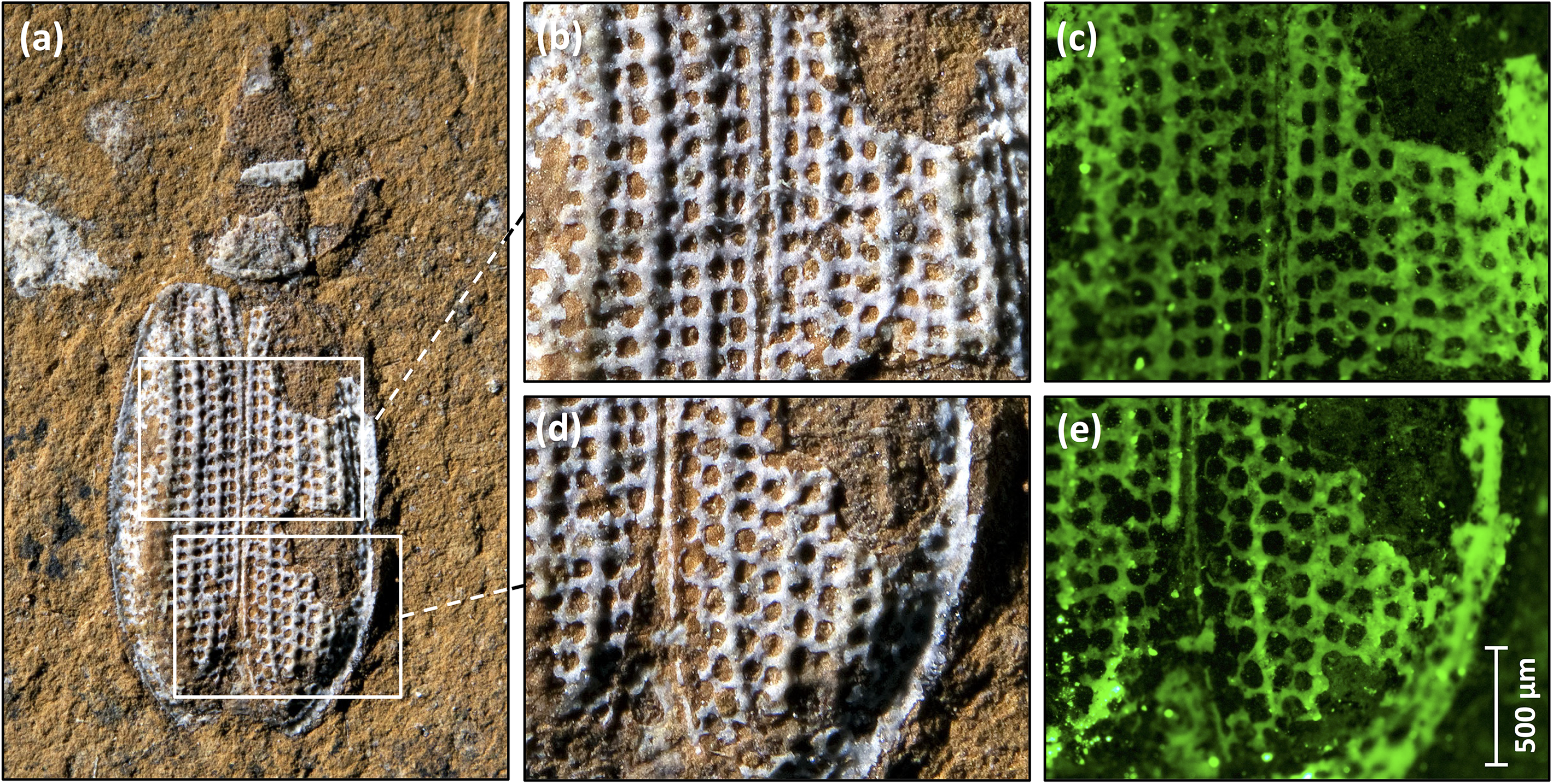

Scientific classification
- Domain: Eukaryota
- Kingdom: Animalia
- Phylum: Arthropoda
- Class: Insecta
- Order: Coleoptera
- Family: Ommatidae
- Genus: †Rhopalomma; Ashman et al., 2015
- Species: †R. stefaniae

Binomial name
- †Rhopalomma stefaniae Ashman et al., 2015

= Rhopalomma =

Rhopalomma Temporal range: Tithonian

Extinct genus of beetles

Rhopalomma is an extinct genus of ommatid beetle. It is known from a single species, Rhopalomma stefaniae described from the Upper Jurassic (Tithonian) Talbragar fossil locality in New South Wales, Australia.
