= Lithocupes =

Lithocupes Temporal range: Carnian

Scientific classification
- Domain: Eukaryota
- Kingdom: Animalia
- Phylum: Arthropoda
- Class: Insecta
- Order: Coleoptera
- Family: Ommatidae
- Genus: †Lithocupes; Ponomarenko, 1966

Extinct genus of beetles

Lithocupes is an extinct genus of beetles in the family Ommatidae, known from the Carnian Madygen Formation of Kyrgyzstan containing the following species:

- Lithocupes gigas Ponomarenko, 1969
- Lithocupes incertus Ponomarenko, 1966
- Lithocupes punctatus Ponomarenko, 1969
