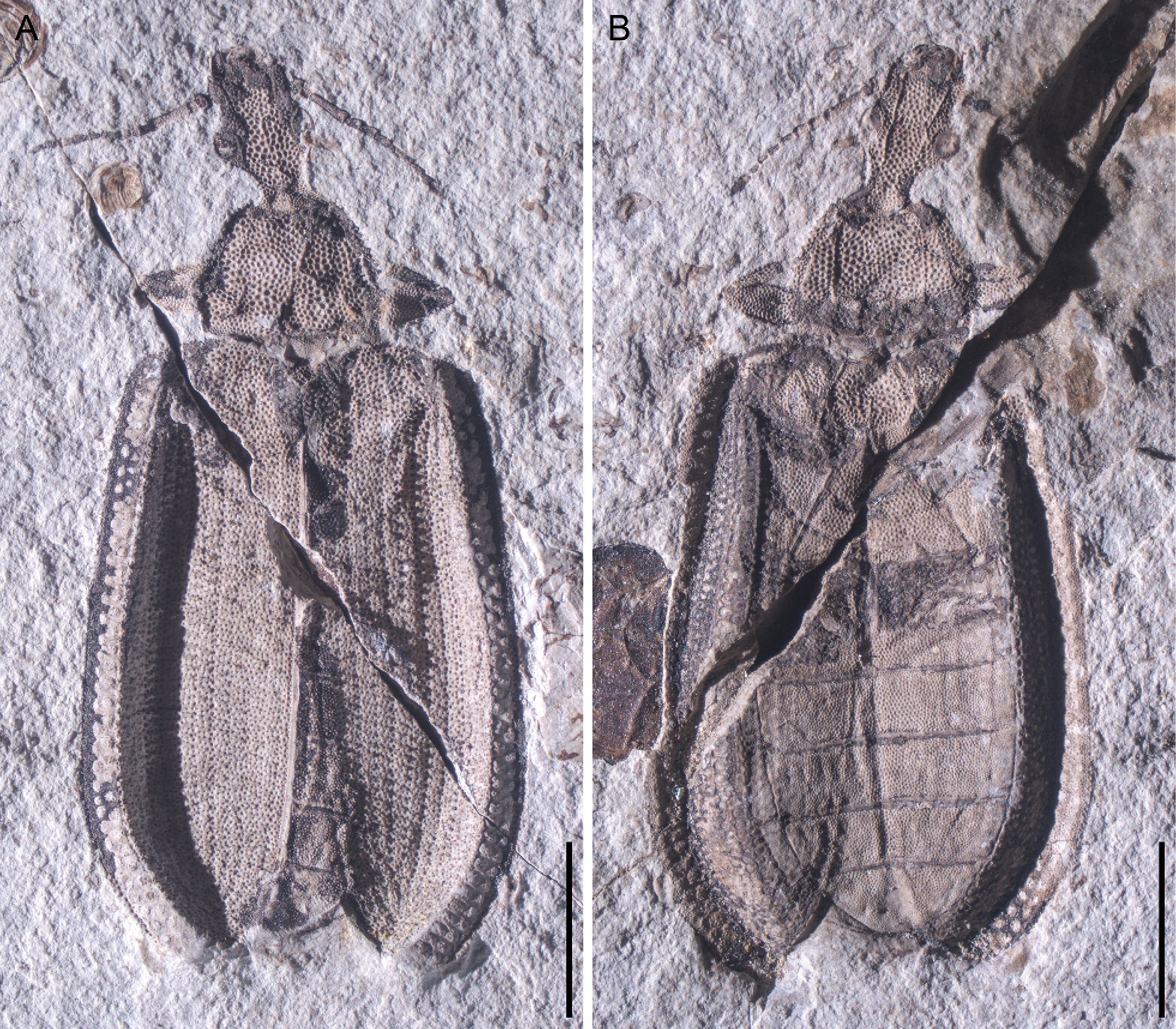

Scientific classification
- Domain: Eukaryota
- Kingdom: Animalia
- Phylum: Arthropoda
- Class: Insecta
- Order: Coleoptera
- Family: Ommatidae
- Genus: †Limnomma; Li & Cai in Li et al., 2021
- Species: †L. daohugouense

Binomial name
- †Limnomma daohugouense Li & Cai in Li et al., 2021

= Limnomma =

Limnomma Temporal range: Bathonian

Extinct genus of beetles

Limnomma is an extinct genus of ommatid beetle from the Middle Jurassic of China. The type and only known species Limnomma daohugouense is known from the Bathonian aged Daohugou Beds of Inner Mongolia, China.
