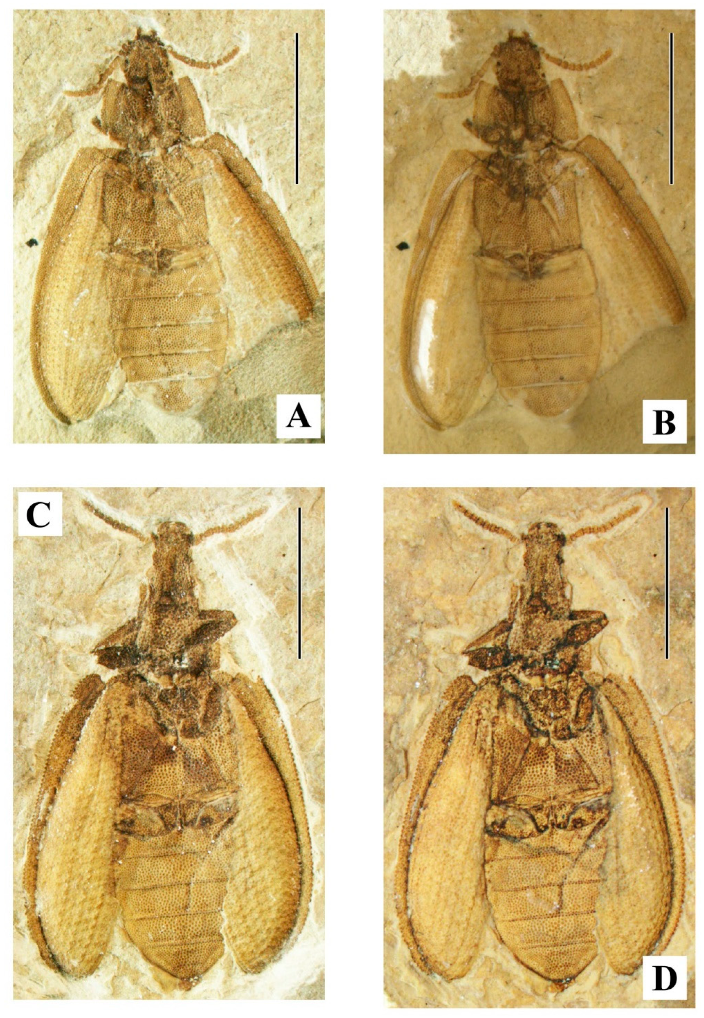
- Odontomma sulcatum (top) and Odontomma trachylema (bottom)

Scientific classification
- Domain: Eukaryota
- Kingdom: Animalia
- Phylum: Arthropoda
- Class: Insecta
- Order: Coleoptera
- Family: Ommatidae
- Genus: †Odontomma; Ren et al., 2006

Species
- †Odontomma trachylaenum Ren et al., 2006; †Odontomma sulcatum (Tan et al., 2007)

= Odontomma =

Odontomma Temporal range: Aptian

Extinct genus of beetles

Odontomma is an extinct genus of ommatid beetle. It is known from two species, O. sulcatum and O. trachylaenum, both known from the Aptian aged Yixian Formation of China. It is characterised by "moderately oval body, moderately more or less long and subparallel or oviform head with comparatively small eyes, rather wide pronotum with the widely explanate carinate sides, all veins ending on Sc along the lateral elytral edge, veins well expressed, explanate elytral sides with diffuse small microtubercles, and abdominal ventrites co-planar (abutting) or looking like bordered along the posterior edge." It is considered morphologically similar to Diluticupes.
