= Fuscicupes =

Fuscicupes Temporal range: Aptian

Scientific classification
- Domain: Eukaryota
- Kingdom: Animalia
- Phylum: Arthropoda
- Class: Insecta
- Order: Coleoptera
- Suborder: incertae sedis
- Genus: †Fuscicupes; Hong & Wang, 1990
- Species: †F. parvus

Binomial name
- †Fuscicupes parvus Hong & Wang, 1990

Genus of beetles

Fuscicupes is an extinct genus of beetles from the Early Cretaceous of eastern China. It contains only one species, Fuscicupes parvus, which was described from a single specimen from Tuanwang, Laiyang city in Shandong province, from the Aptian aged Laiyang Formation. Fuscicupes was originally classified in the subfamily Ommatinae of the family Cupedidae, now generally considered a separate family Ommatidae, but was excluded from it by Kirejtshuk (2020) because of the poor preservation of the only known specimen and the lack of characteristics to assign it to a suborder or family of beetles.
