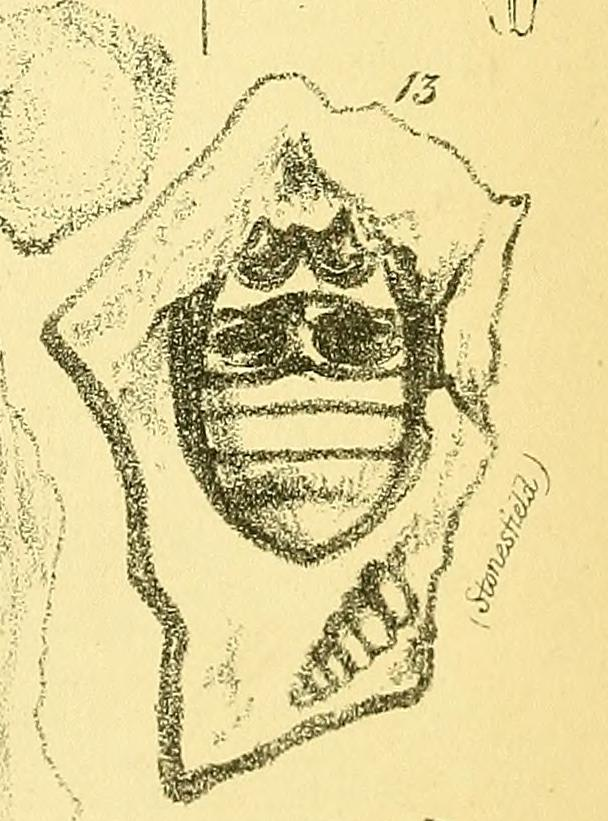
- John O. Westwood's figure of Blapsium egertoni

Scientific classification
- Kingdom: Animalia
- Phylum: Arthropoda
- Class: Insecta
- Order: Coleoptera
- Family: Ommatidae
- Genus: †Blapsium; Westwood, 1854
- Species: †B. egertoni

Binomial name
- †Blapsium egertoni Westwood, 1854

Synonyms
- Blapsidium Phillips, 1871

= Blapsium =

Blapsium Temporal range: Middle Jurassic, Bathonian

Extinct genus of beetles

Blapsium is an extinct genus of beetles from the Middle Jurassic of England. The only described species is B. egertoni, which was first described by John O. Westwood in 1854. The species is known from a single specimen found by the Earl of Enniskillen in the Stonesfield Slate, now known as part of the Taynton Limestone Formation, which Sir Philip Egerton then passed to Westwood for description. The specimen is deposited in the Natural History Museum, London. It is incompletely preserved, lacking a head, pronotum and legs. It has a broad, convex body. It has a very short metathorax, which suggests that it was possibly apterous.

In his original description of the genus, Westwood compared Blapsium to the darkling beetles and ground beetles. Ponomarenko (2006) redescribed the holotype of B. egertoni and referred it to the tribe Notocupedini in the family Ommatidae (considered in the paper to be a subfamily of Cupedidae), which was followed by Kirejtshuk (2020).
