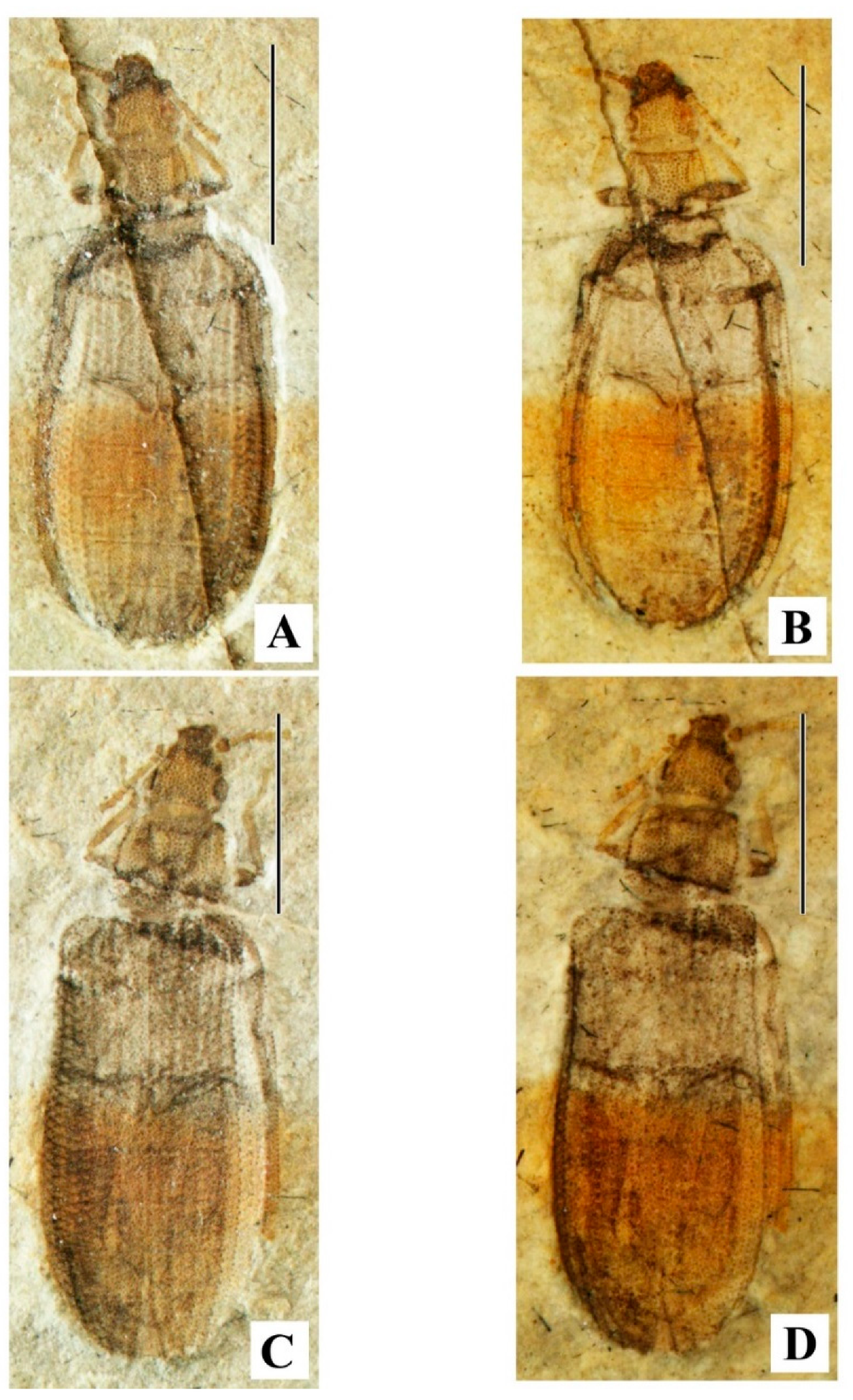
- Monticupes curtinervis

Scientific classification
- Kingdom: Animalia
- Phylum: Arthropoda
- Clade: Pancrustacea
- Class: Insecta
- Order: Coleoptera
- Family: Ommatidae
- Genus: †Monticupes; Ren, 1995

Species
- †Monticupes curtinervis (Tan et al., 2007); †Monticupes decorosus (Tan et al., 2012); †Monticupes fentaiensis Ren, 1995; †Monticupes surrectus Ren, 1995

= Monticupes =

Monticupes Temporal range: Callovian–Aptian

Extinct genus of beetles

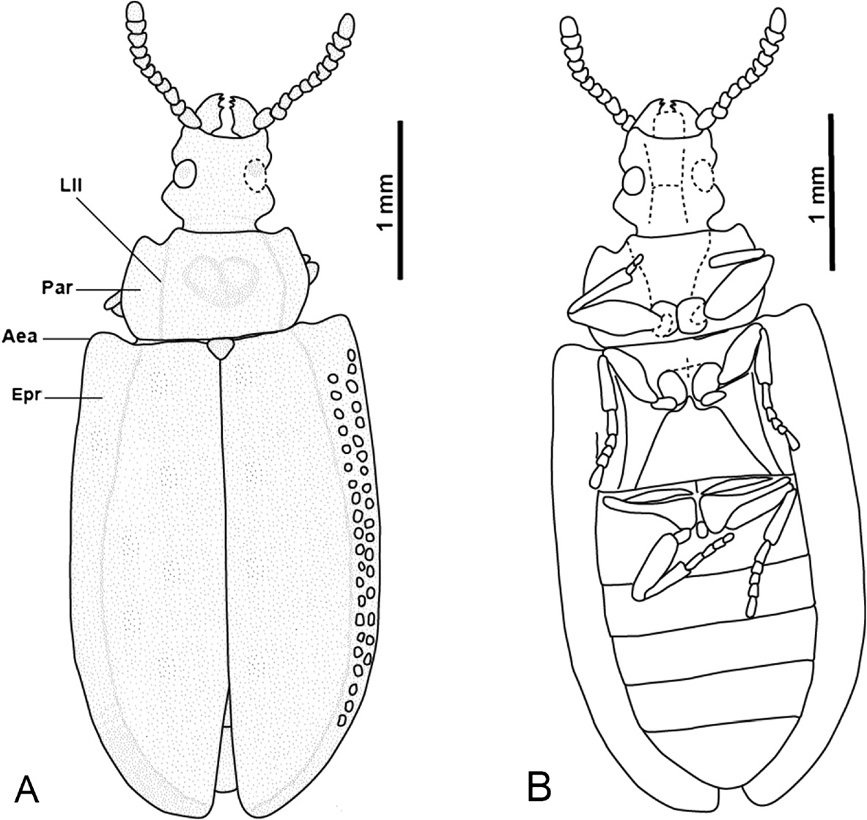
Drawing of Monticupes decorosus

Monticupes is an extinct genus of ommatid beetle. The genus is characterised by "moderately oval body, subtriangular or long (subparallelsided) head with large eyes and well raised temples, pronotum carinate and with subexplanate sides, veins well expressed with fused A1 and Cu at apex and their common vein ending on Sc, explanate elytral sides moderately wide and with diffuse small microtubercles, and abdominal ventrites co-planar (abutting)."

== Species ==
- †Monticupes curtinervis (Tan et al., 2007) – Yixian Formation, China, Aptian
- †Monticupes decorosus (Tan et al., 2012) – Daohugou, China, Callovian
- †Monticupes fentaiensis Ren, 1995 – Lushangfen Formation, China, Aptian
- †Monticupes surrectus Ren, 1995 – Lushangfen Formation, China, Aptian
