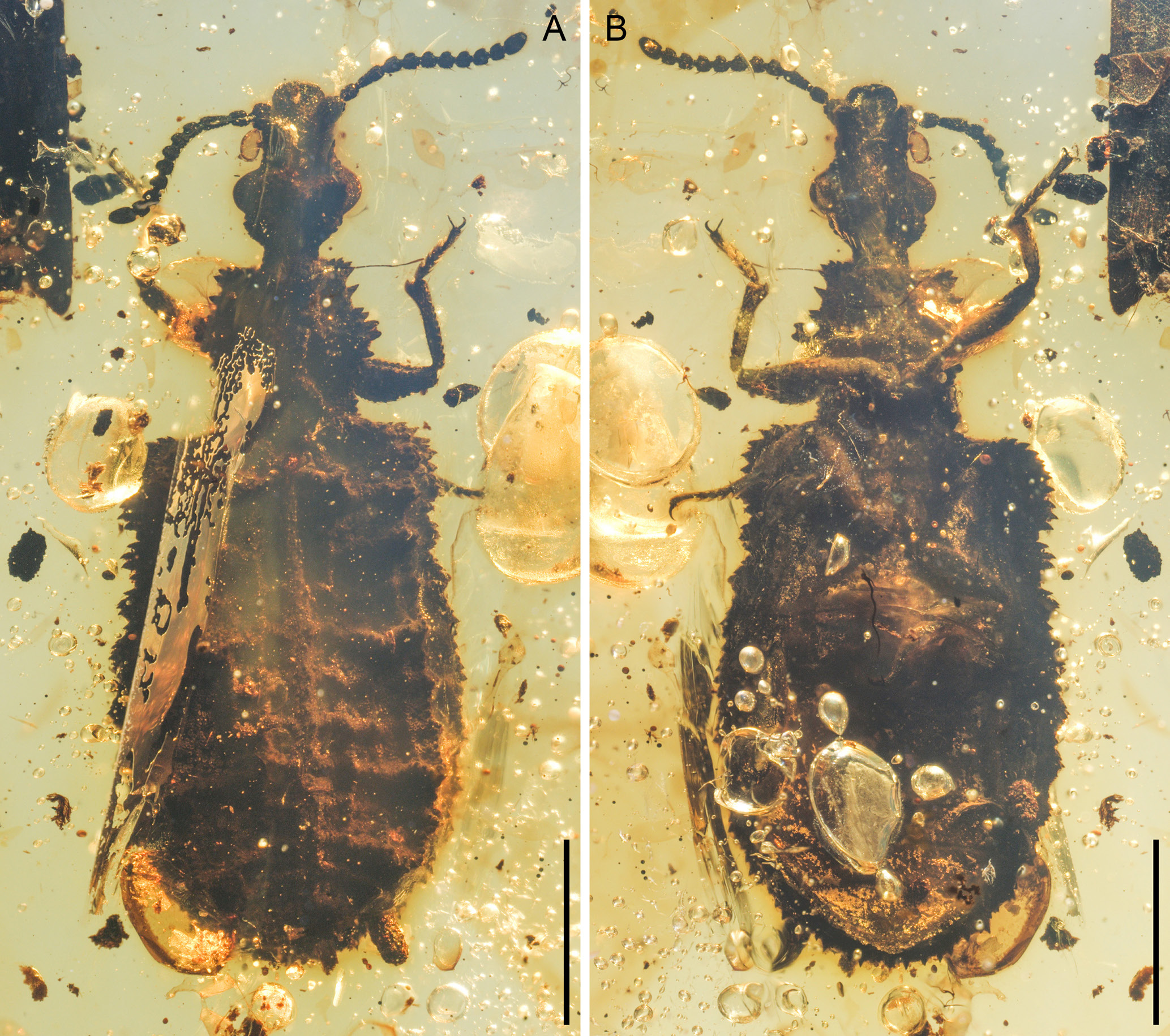
- P. szwedoi
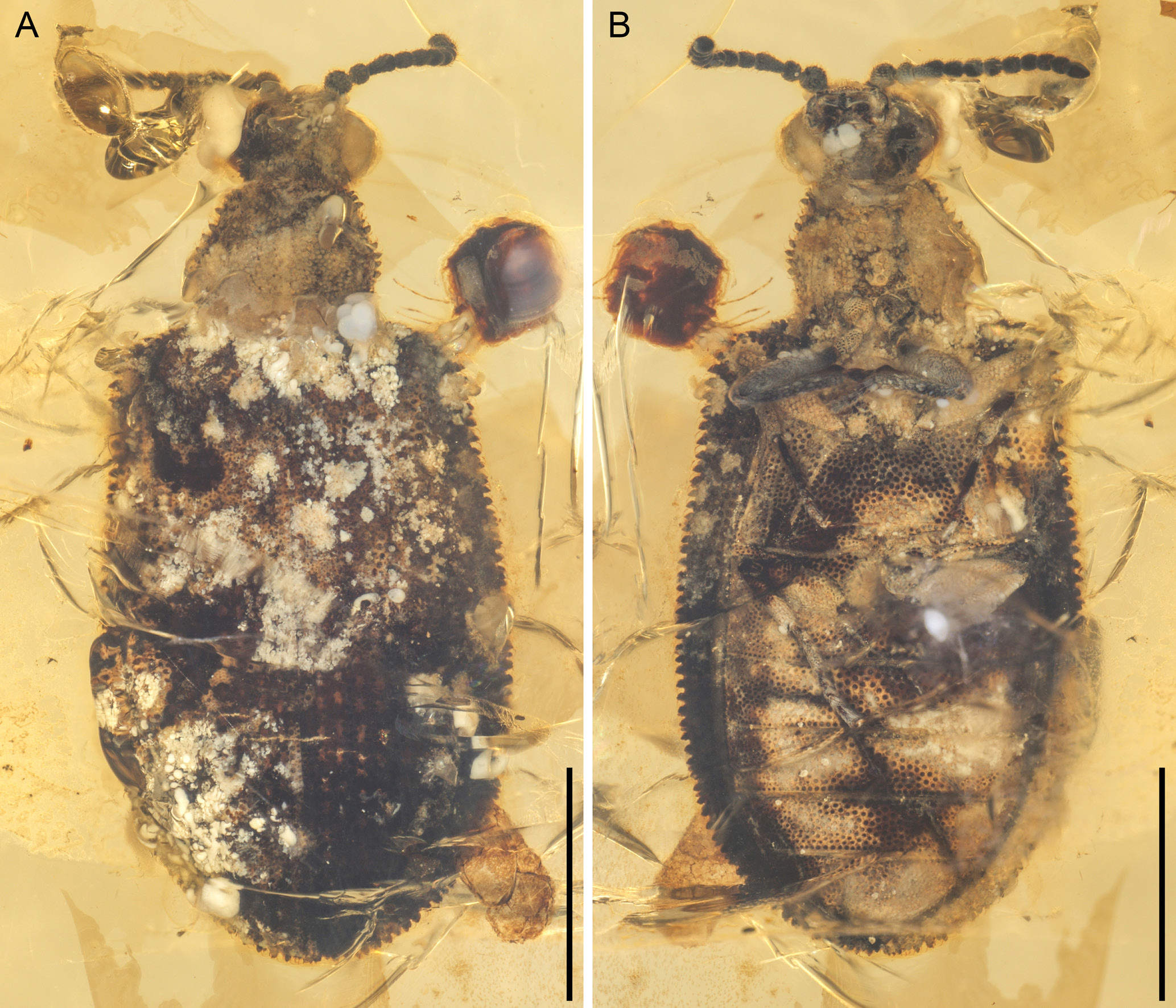
- P. leptocristatum

Scientific classification
- Domain: Eukaryota
- Kingdom: Animalia
- Phylum: Arthropoda
- Class: Insecta
- Order: Coleoptera
- Family: Ommatidae
- Genus: †Paraodontomma; Yamamoto, 2017

Species
- †Paraodontomma burmiticum Yamamoto 2017; †Paraodontomma leptocristatum Li, Yamamoto & Cai in Li et al., 2021; †Paraodontomma szwedoi Jarzembowski et al. 2018

= Paraodontomma =

Paraodontomma Temporal range: Cenomanian

Extinct genus of beetles

Paraodontomma is an extinct genus of ommatid beetle, it is known from three species, P. burmiticum described in 2017, P. szwedoi described in 2018. and P. leptocristatum in 2021. All 3 species are known from the Cenomanian aged Burmese amber.
