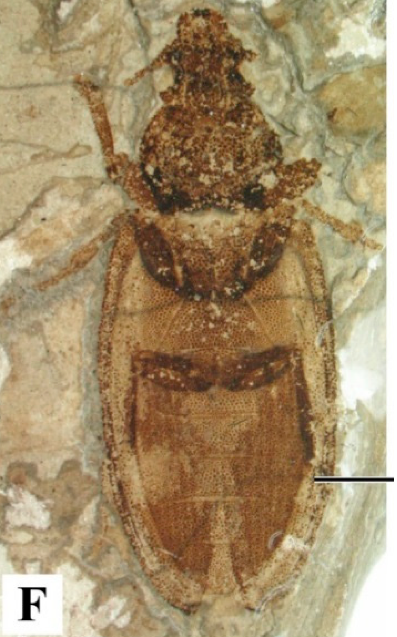
- Cionocoleus planiusculus

Scientific classification
- Kingdom: Animalia
- Phylum: Arthropoda
- Clade: Pancrustacea
- Class: Insecta
- Order: Coleoptera
- Family: Ommatidae
- Genus: †Cionocoleus; Ren, 1995

= Cionocoleus =

Cionocoleus Temporal range: Callovian–Aptian

Extinct genus of beetles

Cionocoleus is an extinct genus of beetles in the family Ommatidae.

== Species ==
According to Kirejtshuk, 2020.

- Cionocoleus cervicalis Tan et al. 2007 – Yixian Formation, China, Aptian
- Cionocoleus elizabethae Jarzembowski et al. 2013 – Weald Clay, United Kingdom, Barremian
- Cionocoleus jepsoni Jarzembowski et al. 2013 – Durlston Formation, United Kingdom, Berriasian
- Cionocoleus longicapitis Soriano & Delclòs, 2006 – La Pedrera de Rúbies Formation, Spain, Barremian
- Cionocoleus magicus Ren, 1995 – Yixian Formation, Lushangfen Formation, China, Aptian
- Cionocoleus minimus Jarzembowski et al. 2013 – Weald Clay Formation, United Kingdom, Hauterivian
- Cionocoleus olympicus Jarzembowski et al. 2013 – Yixian Formation, China, Aptian
- Cionocoleus ommamimus Ponomarenko, 1997 – Anda-Khuduk Formation, Mongolia, Aptian
- Cionocoleus planiusculus Tan et al. 2007 – Yixian Formation, China, Aptian
- Cionocoleus punctatus (Martynov 1926) – Karabastau Formation, Kazakhstan, Callovian/Oxfordian
- Cionocoleus sibiricus Ponomarenko, 2000 – Argun Formation, Russia, Aptian
- Cionocoleus tanae Jarzembowski et al. 2013 – Yixian Formation, China, Aptian
- Cionocoleus watsoni Jarzembowski et al. 2013 – Weald Clay Formation, United Kingdom, Barremian
