= Eurydictyon =

Eurydictyon Temporal range: Pliensbachian

Scientific classification
- Kingdom: Animalia
- Phylum: Arthropoda
- Class: Insecta
- Order: Coleoptera
- Suborder: Archostemata
- Family: incertae sedis
- Genus: †Eurydictyon; Ponomarenko, 1969
- Species: †E. conspicuum

Binomial name
- †Eurydictyon conspicuum Ponomarenko, 1969

Extinct genus of beetles

Eurydictyon is an extinct genus of beetle in the family Ommatidae which contains a single species, Eurydictyon conspicuum. E. conspicuum lived during the Pliensbachian stage of the Early Jurassic, between 189.6 and 183.0 Ma. It measured 18 x 8 mm in length and is known only from specimens found in Kyrgyzstan. Eurydictyon may be closely related to the genus Notocupes.
