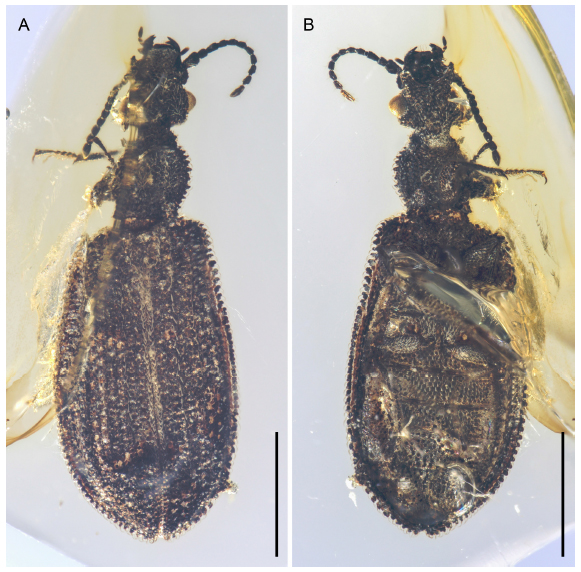

Scientific classification
- Domain: Eukaryota
- Kingdom: Animalia
- Phylum: Arthropoda
- Class: Insecta
- Order: Coleoptera
- Family: Ommatidae
- Genus: †Bukhkalius; Kirejtshuk and Jarzembowski 2020
- Species: †B. lindae

Binomial name
- †Bukhkalius lindae (Jarzembowski et al. 2017)

= Bukhkalius =

Bukhkalius Temporal range: Cenomanian

Extinct genus of beetles

Bukhkalius is an extinct genus of beetle belonging to the family Ommatidae, it contains the single species, Bukhkalius lindae. It was described in 2017 initially as a species of the extant genus Tetraphalerus and was placed into a separate monotypic genus in 2020, which was reaffirmed in a 2021 study. It is known from a single specimen (NIGP 166152) from Burmese amber, dating to the Cenomanian stage of the Late Cretaceous. The specimen is around 4.7 mm long and around 1.3 mm wide.
