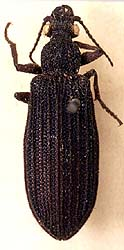
- Omma stanleyi
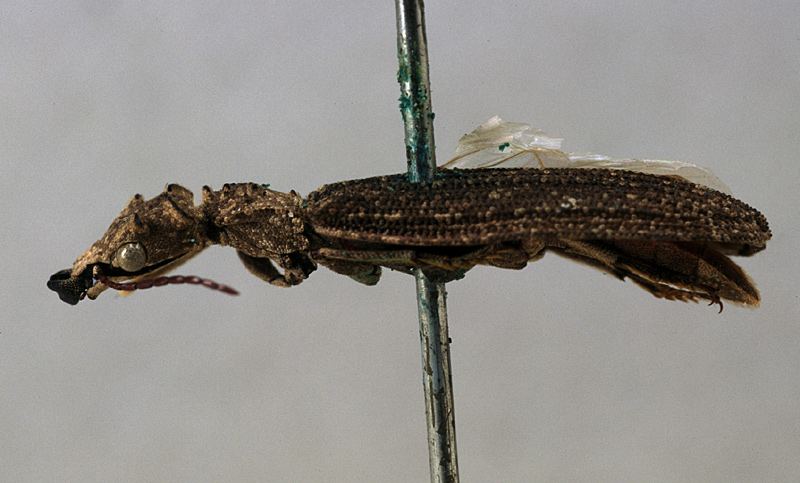
- Tetraphalerus wagneri

Scientific classification
- Kingdom: Animalia
- Phylum: Arthropoda
- Clade: Pancrustacea
- Class: Insecta
- Order: Coleoptera
- Suborder: Archostemata
- Family: Ommatidae; Sharp & Muir, 1912

= Ommatidae =

Ommatidae Temporal range: Ladinian–Recent

Family of beetles

The Ommatidae are a family of beetles in the suborder Archostemata. The Ommatidae are considered the extant beetle family that has most ancestral characteristics. There are only seven extant species, confined to Australia and South America. However, the geographical distribution was much wider during the Mesozoic spanning across Eurasia, South America, and Australia, suggesting that they were widespread on Pangea. So far, over 26 extinct genera containing over 170 species of these beetles have been described. Three extant genera have been assigned to this family: Omma, Tetraphalerus and Beutelius. The family is considered to be a subfamily of Cupedidae by some authors, but have been found to be more closely related to Micromalthidae in molecular phylogenies. A close relationship with Micromalthidae is supported by several morphological characters, including those of the mandibles and male genitalia. Due to their rarity, their ecology is obscure, it is likely that their larvae feed on deadwood.

== Genera ==
According to Kirejtshuk, 2020 and subsequent literature.

=== Extinct genera ===
- †Allophalerus Kirejtshuk, 2020 – Early Jurassic-Late Cretaceous (Asia)
- †Asiania Lee et al., 2023 – Early Cretaceous (South Korea)
- †Blapsium Westwood, 1854 – Middle Jurassic (England)
- †Brochocoleus Hong, 1982 – Early Jurassic-Late Cretaceous (Eurasia)
- †Bukhkalius Kirejtshuk and Jarzembowski, 2020 – Burmese amber, Myanmar, mid-Cretaceous (Albian-Cenomanian)
- †Burmocoleus Kirejtshuk, 2020 – Burmese amber, Myanmar, mid-Cretaceous (Albian-Cenomanian)
- †Cionocoleus Ren, 1995 – Middle Jurassic-Early Cretaceous (Eurasia)
- †Cionocups Kirejtshuk, 2020 – Burmese amber, Myanmar, mid-Cretaceous (Albian-Cenomanian)
- †Clessidromma Jarzembowski et al., 2017 – Burmese amber, Myanmar, mid-Cretaceous (Albian-Cenomanian)
- †Diluticupes Ren, 1995 – Middle Jurassic-Early Cretaceous (Eurasia)
- †Echinocups Kirejtshuk and Jarzembowski, 2020 – Burmese amber, Myanmar, mid-Cretaceous (Albian-Cenomanian) (other authors consider this genus a junior synonym of Notocupes)
- †?Eurydictyon Ponomarenko, 1969 – Early Jurassic (Kyrgyzstan) (possibly closely related to Notocupes)
- †Jarzembowskiops Kirejtshuk, 2020 – Burmese amber, Myanmar, mid-Cretaceous (Albian-Cenomanian)
- †Kirejtomma Li and Cai, 2021 – Burmese amber, Myanmar, mid-Cretaceous (Albian-Cenomanian)
- †Lepidomma Jarzembowski et al., 2019 – Burmese amber, Myanmar, mid-Cretaceous (Albian-Cenomanian)
- †Liassocupes Zeuner, 1962 – Early Jurassic (England)
- †Limnomma Li and Cai in Li et al., 2021 – Middle Jurassic (China)
- †Lithocupes Ponomarenko, 1966 – Late Triassic (Kyrgyzstan)
- †Miniomma Li, Yamamoto and Cai, 2020 – Burmese amber, Myanmar, mid-Cretaceous (Albian-Cenomanian)
- †Monticupes Ren, 1995 – Middle Jurassic-Early Cretaceous (China)
- †?Notocupes Ponomarenko, 1964 – Middle Triassic-Late Cretaceous (Eurasia) (other authors have considered this genus more closely related to Cupedidae)
- †?Notocupoides Ponomarenko, 1966 – Late Triassic (Kyrgyzstan) (possibly closely related to Notocupes)
- †Odontomma Ren et al., 2006 – Early Cretaceous (China)
- †Paraodontomma Yamamoto, 2017 – Burmese amber, Myanmar, mid-Cretaceous (Albian-Cenomanian)
- †Pareuryomma Tan et al., 2012 – Early Cretaceous (China)
- †Polyakius Kirejtshuk, 2020 – Burmese amber, Myanmar, mid-Cretaceous (Albian-Cenomanian)
- †?Rhabdocupes Ponomarenko, 1966 – Late Triassic (Kyrgyzstan) (possibly closely related to Notocupes)
- †Rhopalomma Ashman et al., 2015 – Late Jurassic (Australia)
- †Stegocoleus Jarzembowski and Wang, 2016 – Burmese amber, Myanmar, mid-Cretaceous (Albian-Cenomanian)
- †Tetraphalerites Crowson, 1962 – Eocene (England)
- †Zygadenia Handlirsch, 1906 – Early Jurassic-Early Cretaceous (Eurasia, ?Australia) (probably closely related to Notocupes)

=== Extant genera ===
- Omma Newman, 1839 – Late Triassic-Late Cretaceous (Eurasia), recent (Australia)
- Tetraphalerus Waterhouse, 1901 – Middle Jurassic-Early Cretaceous (Asia), Cretaceous-recent (South America)
- Beutelius Escalona et al., 2020 – Recent (Australia)

The extinct genus Fuscicupes Hong and Wang 1990 was included in the family by some authors, but was excluded by Kirejtshuk (2020).

== Gallery ==
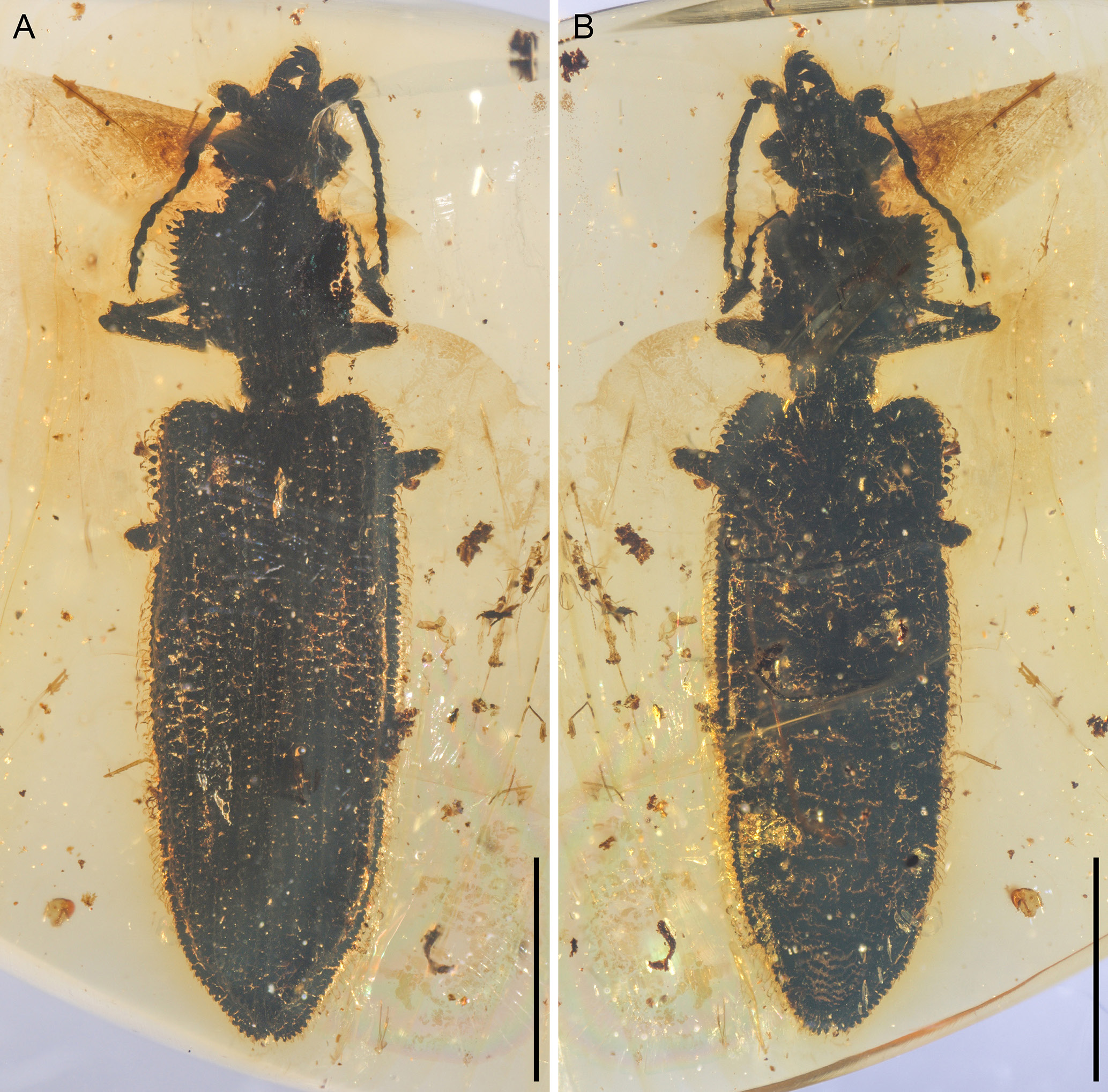
Clessidromma

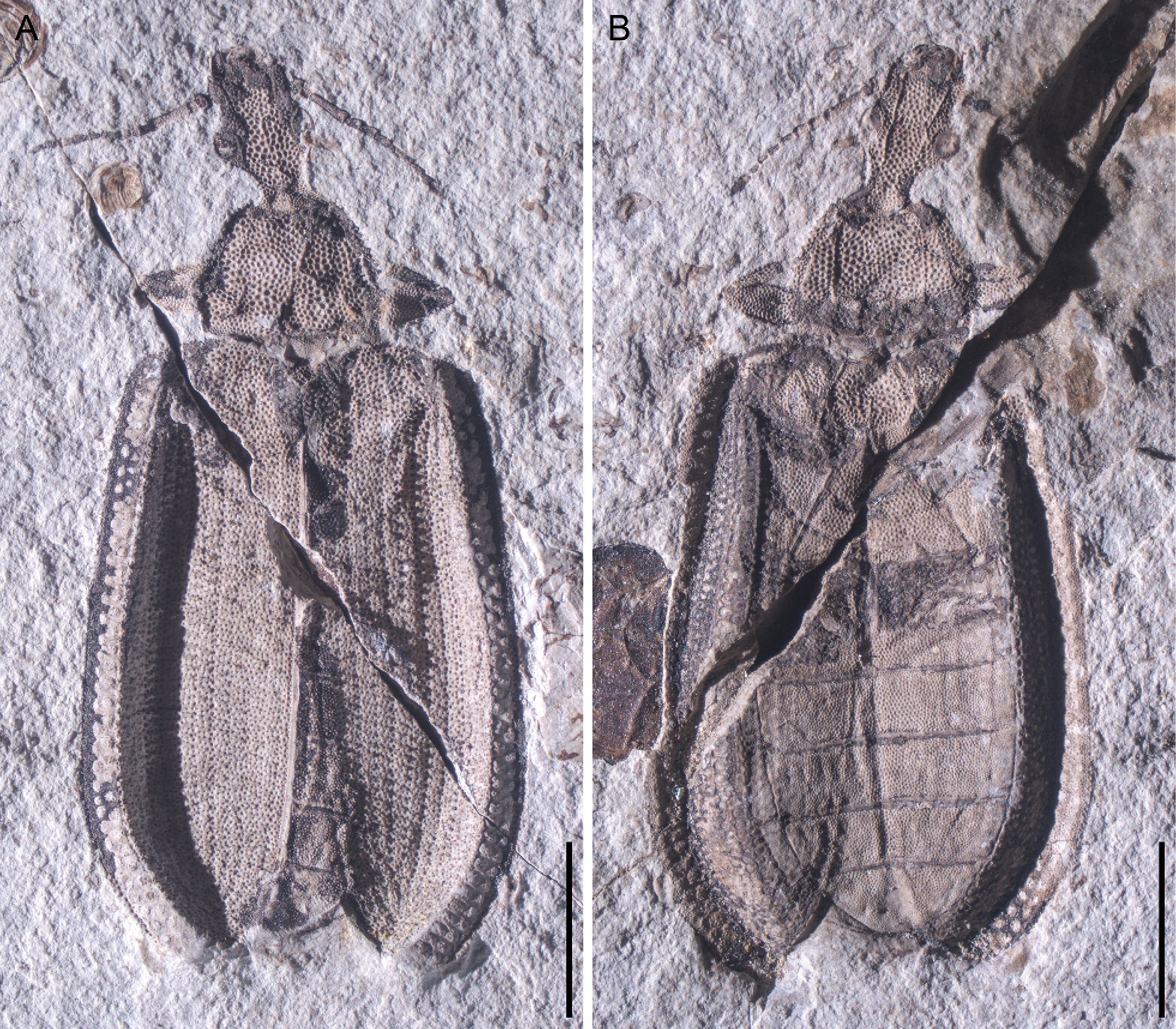
Limnomma

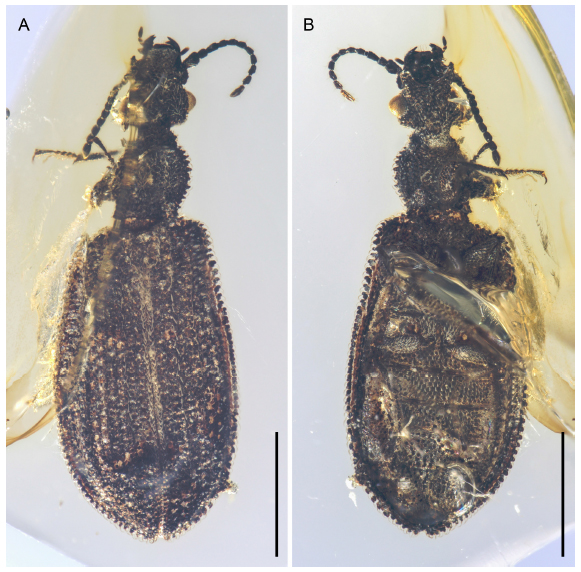
Bukhkalius

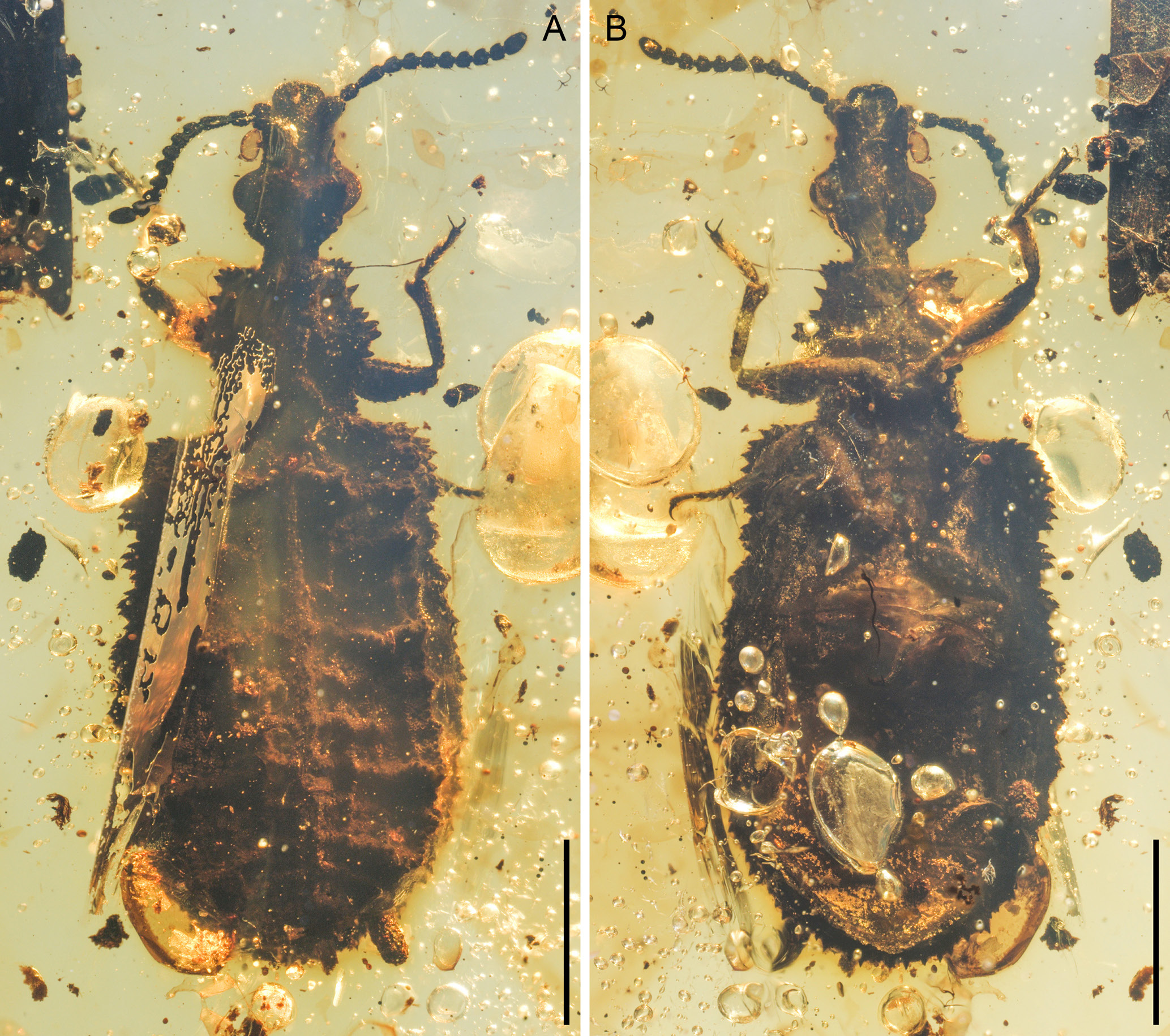
Paraodontomma

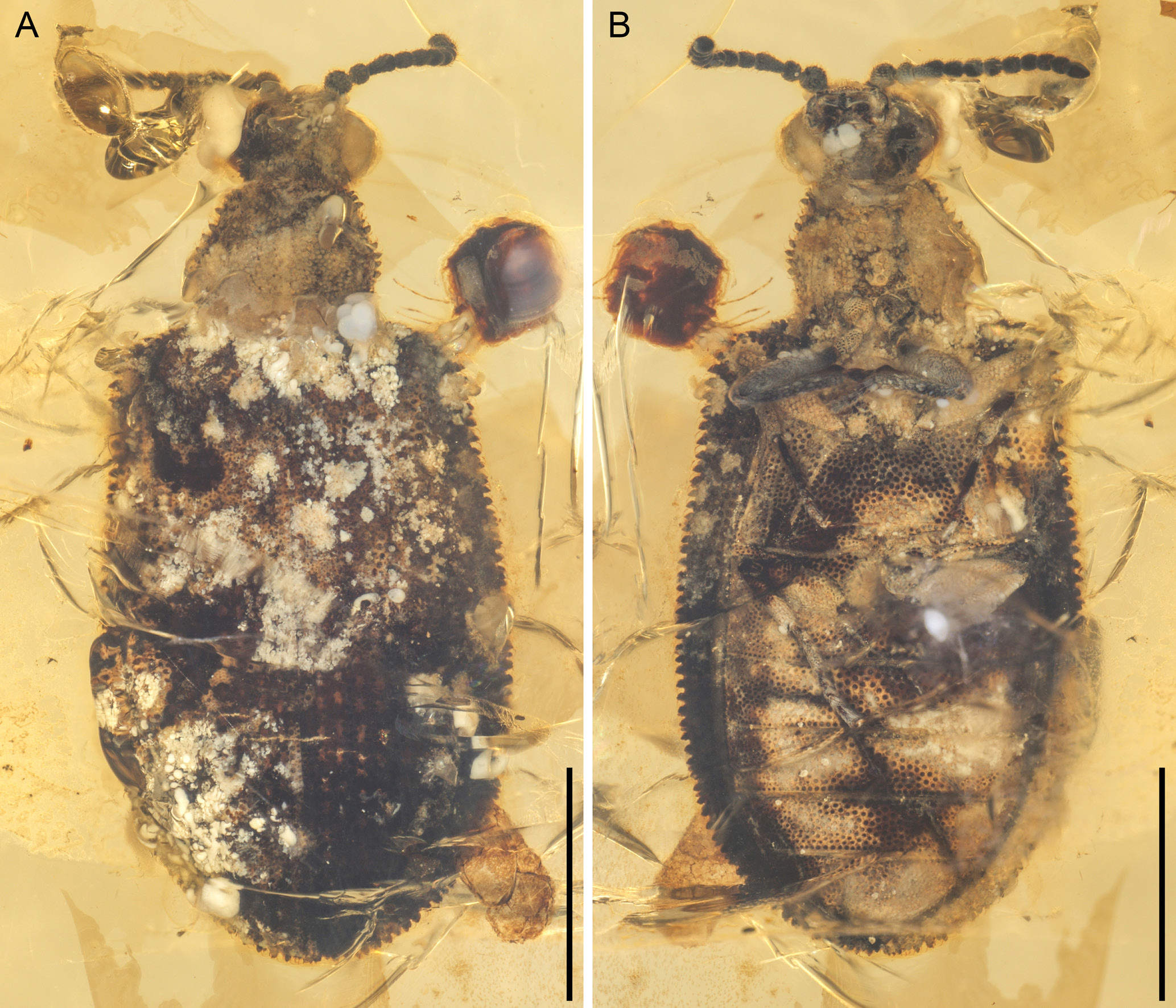
Paraodontomma

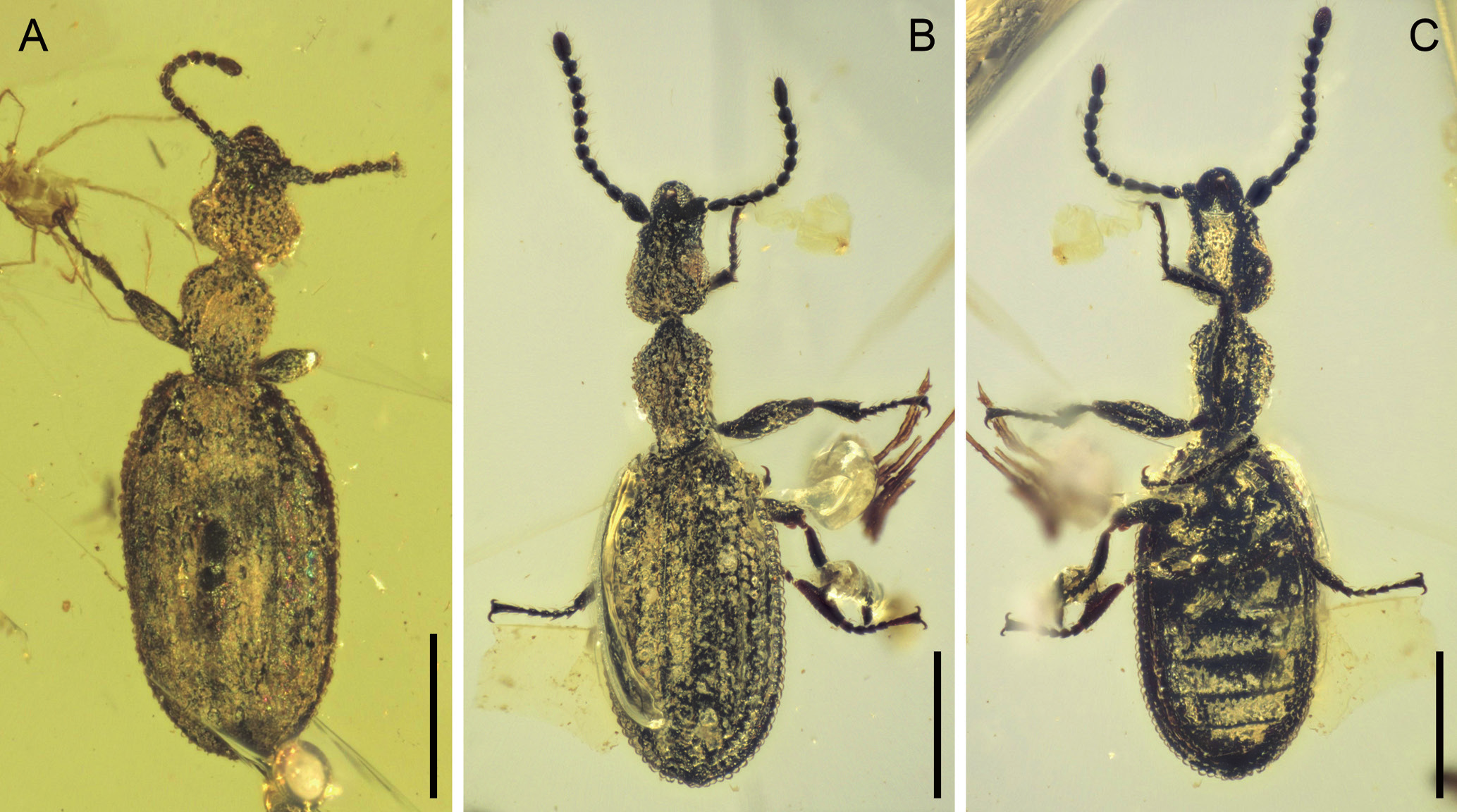
Miniomma

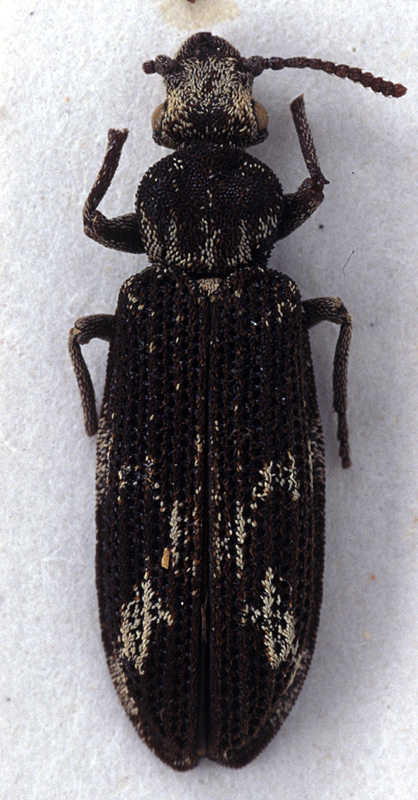
Beutelius sagitta

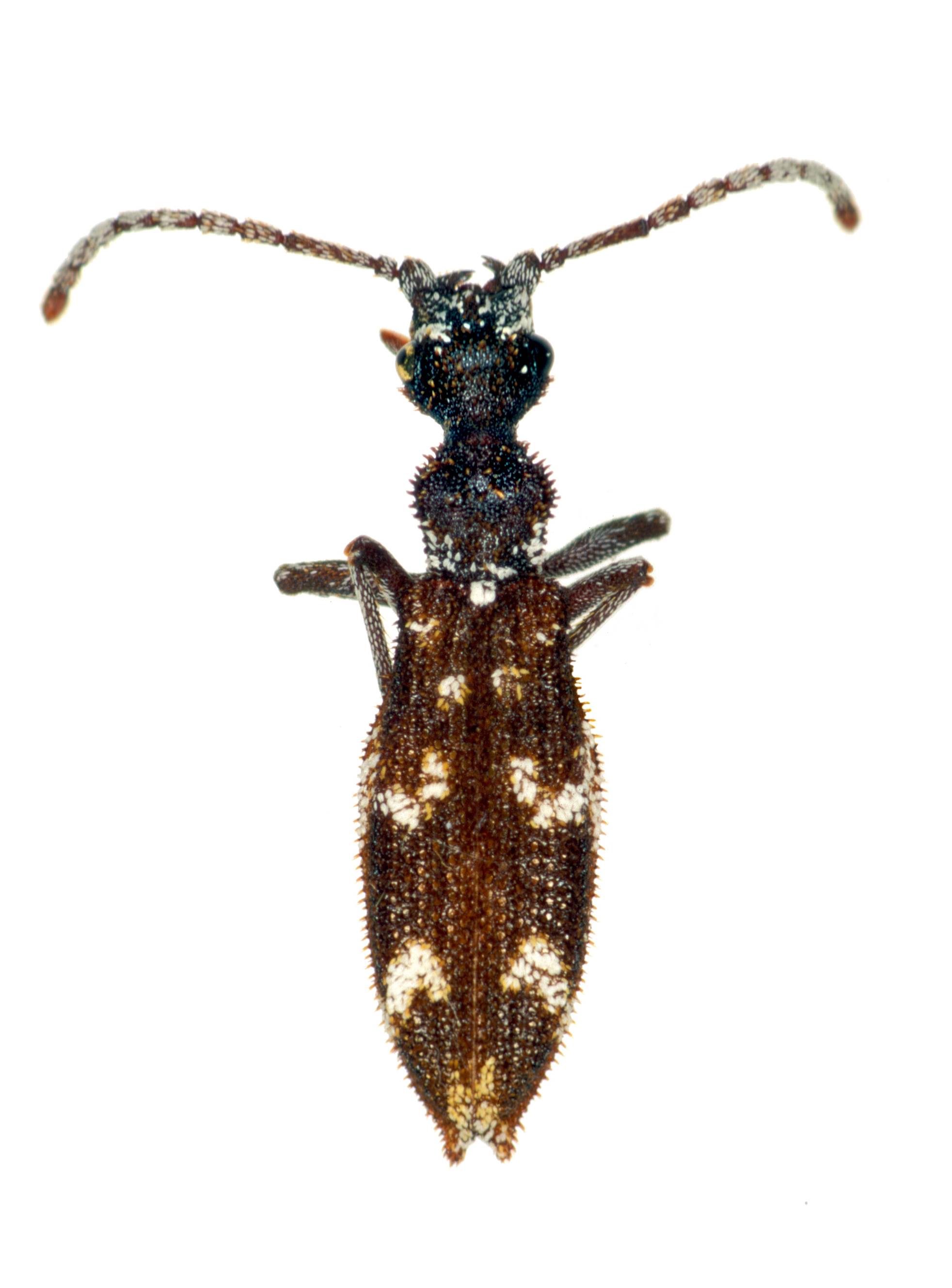
Beutelius rutherfordi
