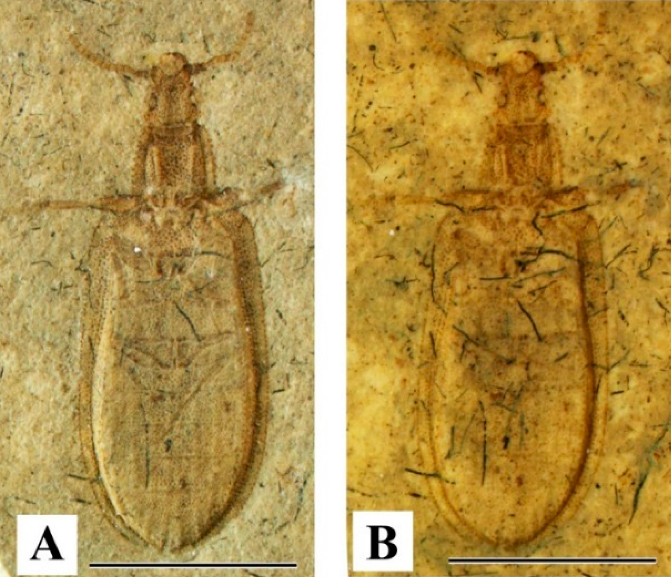
- Allophalerus latus

Scientific classification
- Kingdom: Animalia
- Phylum: Arthropoda
- Clade: Pancrustacea
- Class: Insecta
- Order: Coleoptera
- Family: Ommatidae
- Genus: †Allophalerus; Kirejtshuk, 2020

= Allophalerus =

Allophalerus Temporal range: Hettangian–Turonian

Extinct genus of beetles

Allophalerus is an extinct genus of beetle in the family Ommatidae. It is known from nine species formerly included in the genus Tetraphalerus.

== Systematics ==
- †Allophalerus antiquus (Ponomarenko 1964) – Karabastau Formation, Kazakhstan, Oxfordian
- †Allophalerus aphaleratus (Ponomarenko 1969) – Kyzyl-Kiya, Kyrgyzstan, Pliensbachian
- †Allophalerus bontsaganensis (Ponomarenko 1997) – Dzun-Bain Formation, Mongolia, Aptian
- †Allophalerus incertus (Ponomarenko 1969) – Dzhil Formation, Kyrgyzstan, Hettangian
- †Allophalerus latus (Tan et al. 2007) – Yixian Formation, China, Aptian
- †Allophalerus maximus (Ponomarenko 1968) – Karabastau Formation, Kazakhstan, Oxfordian
- †Allophalerus okhotensis (Ponomarenko 1993) – Emanra Formation, Russian Federation, Turonian
- †Allophalerus tenuipes (Ponomarenko 1964) – Karabastau Formation, Kazakhstan, Oxfordian
- †Allophalerus verrucosus (Ponomarenko 1966) – Zaza Formation, Russia, Aptian
