= Diluticupes =

Diluticupes Temporal range: Callovian–Aptian

Scientific classification
- Kingdom: Animalia
- Phylum: Arthropoda
- Clade: Pancrustacea
- Class: Insecta
- Order: Coleoptera
- Family: Ommatidae
- Genus: †Diluticupes; Ren 1995

Extinct genus of beetles

Diluticupes is an extinct genus of beetle in the family Ommatidae.

== Species ==
- †Diluticupes applanatus (Tan and Ren, 2009) – Daohugou, China, Callovian
- †Diluticupes crowsonae (Jarzembowski et al., 2013) – Weald Clay, United Kingdom, Barremian
- †Diluticupes impressus Ren, 1995 – Lushangfen Formation, Yixian Formation, China, Aptian
- †Diluticupes magnus (Tan and Ren, 2009) – Daohugou, China, Callovian
- †Diluticupes minor (Ponomarenko, 2000) – Argun Formation, Russia, Aptian
- †Diluticupes validus (Tan and Ren, 2009) – Daohugou, China, Callovian
- †Diluticupes yangshuwanziensis (Jarzembowski et al., 2013) – Yixian Formation, China, Aptian
