= Tetraphalerites =

Tetraphalerites Temporal range: Priabonian

Scientific classification
- Kingdom: Animalia
- Phylum: Arthropoda
- Class: Insecta
- Order: Coleoptera
- Family: Ommatidae
- Genus: †Tetraphalerites; Crowson, 1962
- Species: †T. oligocenicus

Binomial name
- †Tetraphalerites oligocenicus Crowson, 1962

Extinct genus of beetles

Tetraphalerites is an extinct genus of ommatid archostematan beetle. It contains only one species, Tetraphalerites oligocenicus described by Roy Crowson in 1962 for a specimen from the Priabonian (late Eocene) aged Insect Limestone, Bembridge Marls of the Isle of Wight, UK.
