= Jarzembowskiops =

Jarzembowskiops Temporal range: Cenomanian

Scientific classification
- Kingdom: Animalia
- Phylum: Arthropoda
- Clade: Pancrustacea
- Class: Insecta
- Order: Coleoptera
- Family: Ommatidae
- Genus: †Jarzembowskiops; Kirejtshuk, 2020
- Species: †J. caseyi

Binomial name
- †Jarzembowskiops caseyi (Jarzembowski, Wang et Zheng, 2016)

Extinct genus of beetles

Jarzembowskiops is an extinct genus of ommatid beetle. It is known from one species, J. caseyi described from the Cenomanian aged Burmese amber of Myanmar. It was originally placed as a species of Brochocoleus, but was subsequently considered distinct enough to warrant its placement in its own separate genus. The species is named after Raymond Casey, a British geologist, while the genus is named after Edmund Jarzembowski, a noted British palaeoentomologist.
