= Lushangfen Formation =

Early Cretaceous aged geologic formation in China

- Stratigraphic range: Aptian; ~120–112 Ma
- Type: Geological formation

Location
- Country: China

The Lushangfen Formation is an Early Cretaceous aged geologic formation in China. Dinosaur remains are among the fossils that have been recovered from the formation, although none have yet been referred to a specific genus.

== See also ==
- List of dinosaur-bearing rock formations
  - List of stratigraphic units with indeterminate dinosaur fossils
