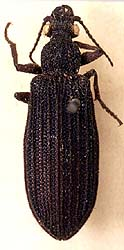
- Omma stanleyi

Scientific classification
- Kingdom: Animalia
- Phylum: Arthropoda
- Clade: Pancrustacea
- Class: Insecta
- Order: Coleoptera
- Family: Ommatidae
- Genus: Omma; Newman, 1839

Type species
- Omma stanleyi Newman, 1839

Synonyms
- Procarabus Oppenheim, 1888; Chalepocarabus Handlirsch, 1906; Pyrochroophana Handlirsch, 1906; Ommamima Ponomarenko, 1964; ?Cionocups Kirejtshuk, 2020

= Omma =

Omma Temporal range: Rhaetian–Recent

Genus of beetles

Omma is a genus of beetles in the family Ommatidae. Omma is an example of a living fossil. The oldest species known, O. liassicum, lived during the final stage of the Triassic (Rhaetian), over 200 million years ago, though the placement of this species in Omma has been questioned. Numerous other fossil species are known from the Jurassic and Cretaceous of Europe and Asia. The only living species is Omma stanleyi, which is endemic to Australia. Three other extant species endemic to Australia that were formerly part of this genus were moved to the separate genus Beutelius in 2020. Omma stanleyi is strongly associated with wood, being found under Eucalyptus bark and exhibiting thanatosis when disturbed. Its larval stage and many other life details are unknown due to its rarity. Males are typically 14–20 mm in length, while females are 14.4-27.5 mm. Omma stanleyi occurs throughout eastern Australia from Victoria to Central Queensland.

== Description ==
According to Li, Huang & Cai, 2021, Omma is distinguished from other ommatid beetles by the following characters:

Head without prominent posterior protuberances. Labrum with dentate anterior margin. Separate mentum absent. Anterior third of gulamentum not depressed. Pronotal disc with rounded lateral edges; dorsal surface without ridges or protuberances. Sternopleural suture absent. Prosternal process short. Punctured explanate elytral epipleura absent. CuA of hind wings forked; wedge cell present. Abdominal ventrites abutting.

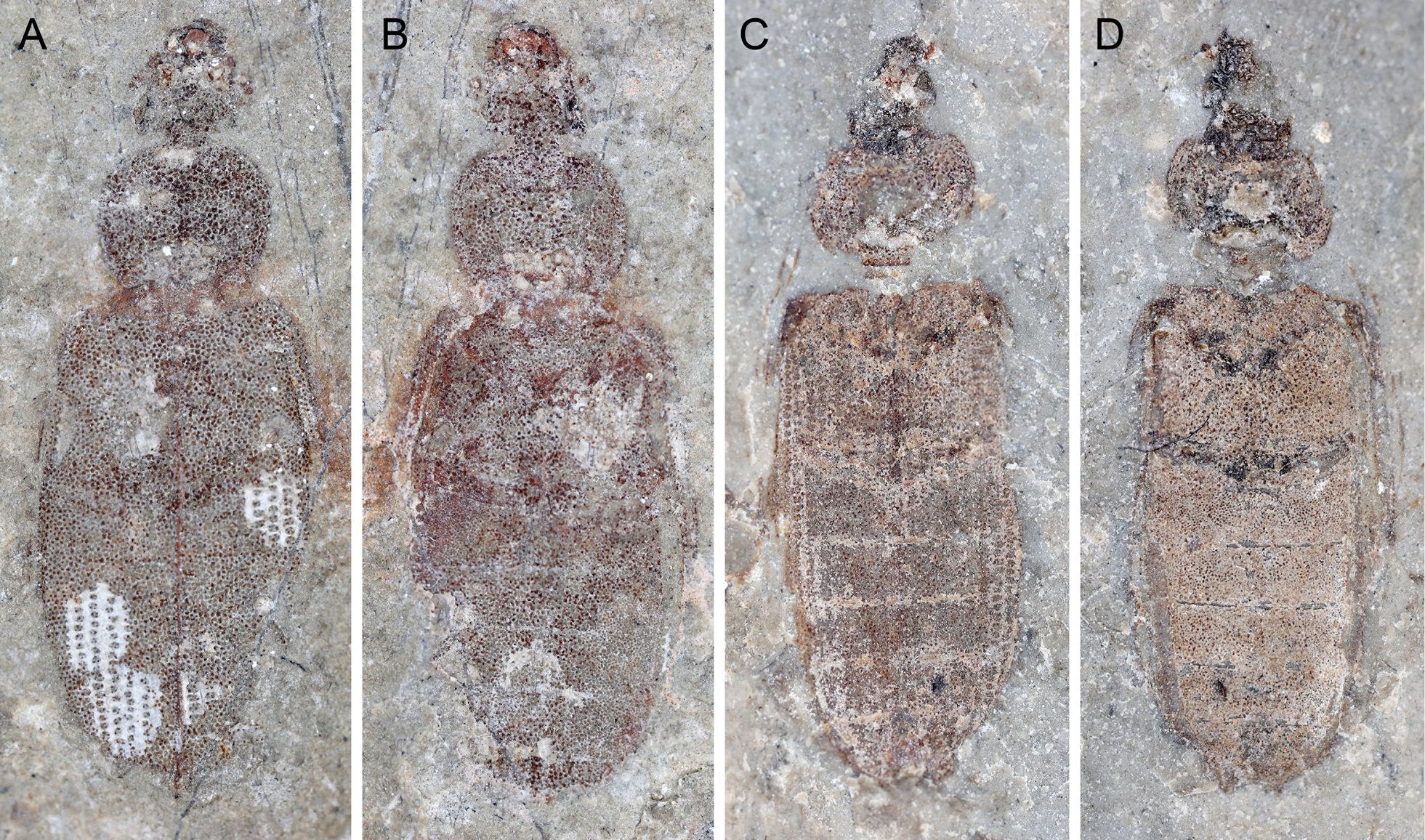
Holotype (A,B) and paratype (C,D) specimens of Omma liassicum dating to the Triassic-Jurassic boundary ~ 200 million years ago

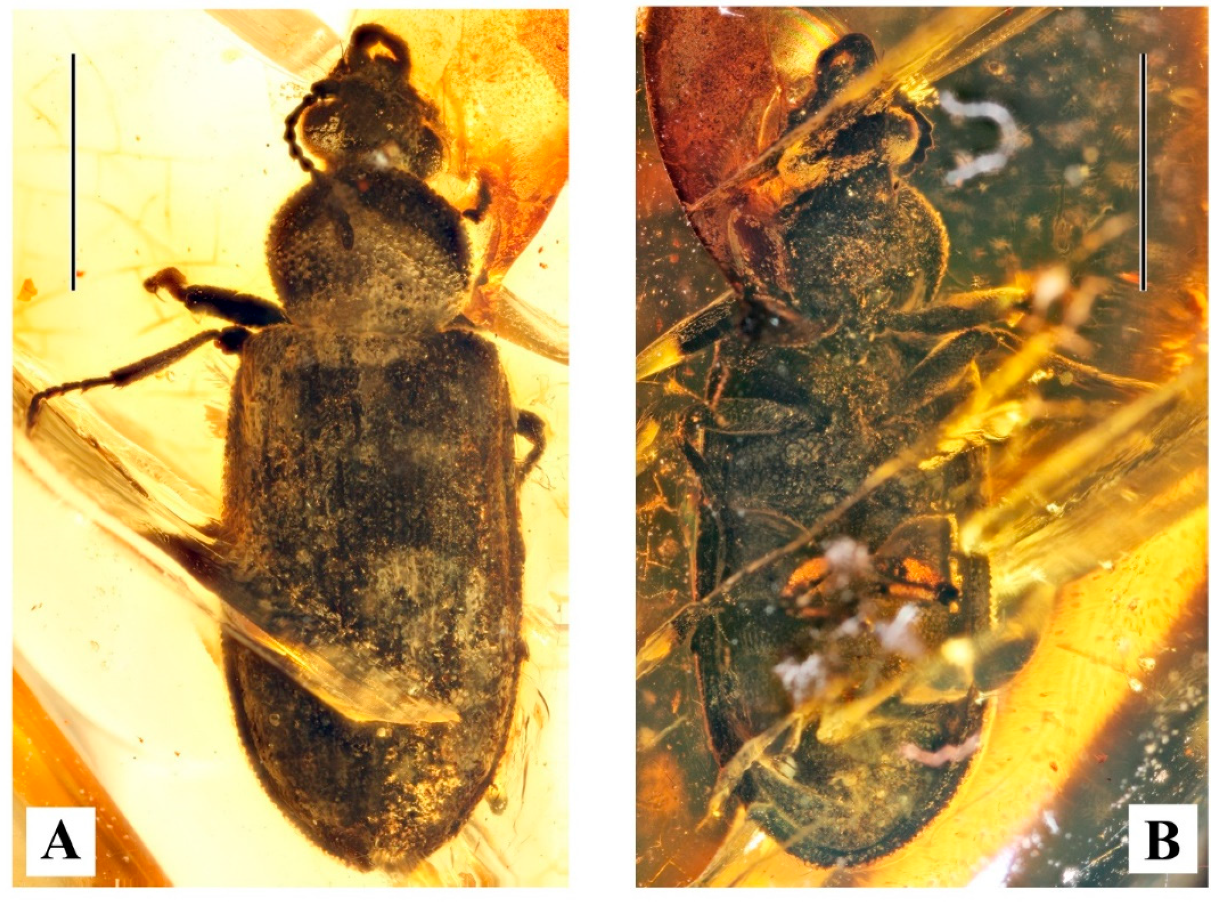
Holotype specimen Omma janetae from the Mid-Cretaceous Burmese amber of Myanmar, dating to around 100 million years ago

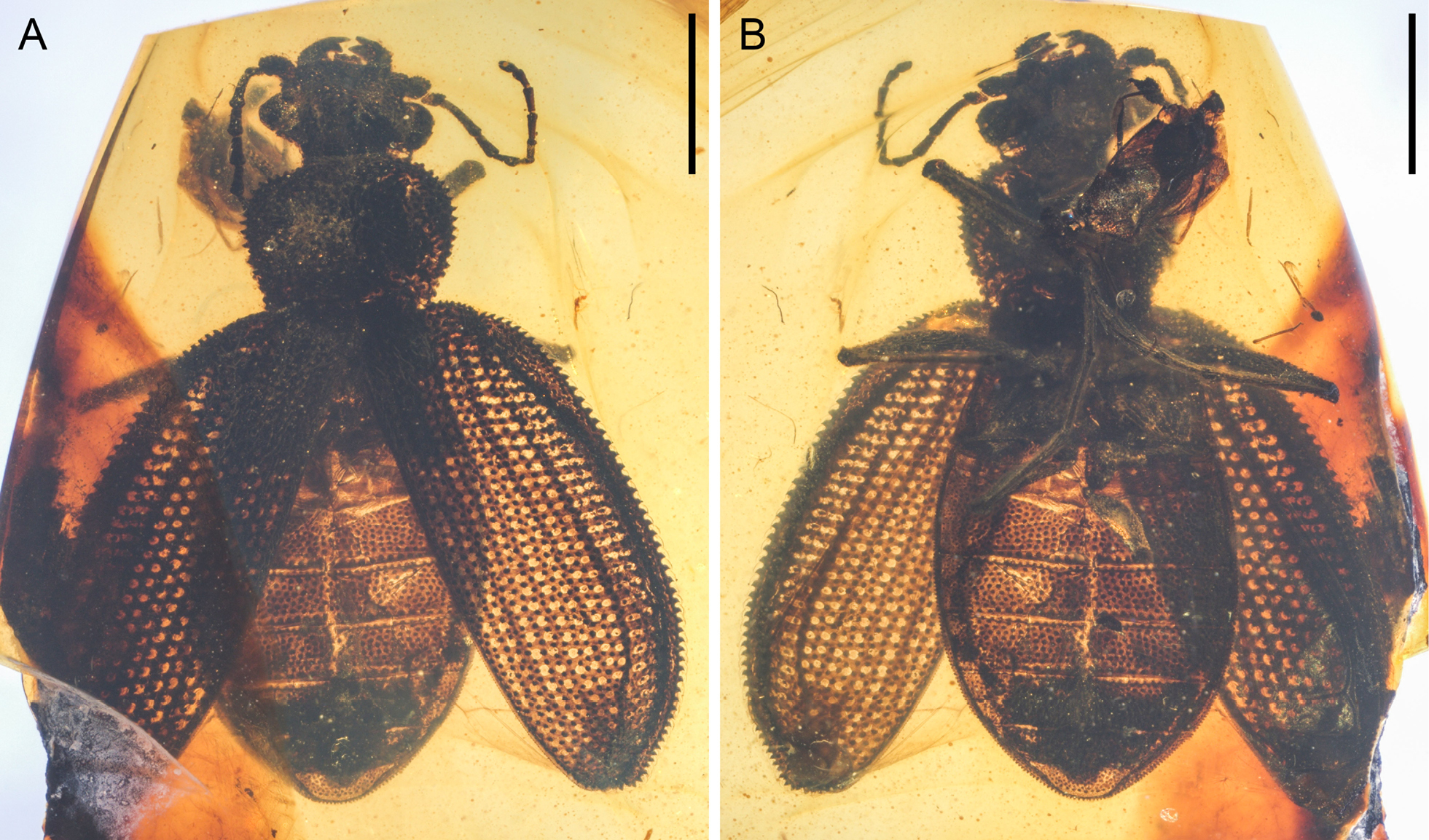
Specimen of Omma forte from the Mid-Cretaceous Burmese amber of Myanmar

== Species ==
The following extinct and extant species have been described. Taxa labelled (?) are considered questionable by Kirejtshuk, 2020.

Omma stanleyi Newman, 1839 (type), recent, Australia

=== Fossil species ===
- Middle-Late Jurassic, Jiulongshan Formation and Tiaojishan Formation, Inner Mongolia, China,
  - Omma ancistrodontum (Tan, Wang, Ren & Yang, 2012) = Pareuryomma ancistrodontum (Callovian-Oxfordian), Daohugou Village, Shantou Township, Ningcheng County, Inner Mongolia, China
  - (?)Omma daxishanense Cai & Huang, 2017 Upper Jurassic (Oxfordian), China
  - Omma delicatum Tan, Wang, Ren & Yang, 2012
- Late Jurassic (Oxfordian and Kimmeridgian) Karabastau Formation, Karatau, Kazakhstan
  - Omma aberratum Ponomarenko, 1968
  - (?)Omma grande (Ponomarenko, 1964) = Tetraphalerus grandis
  - Omma jurassicum Ponomarenko, 1968
  - Omma pilosum (Ponomarenko, 1964) = Ommamima pilosum
- Upper Jurassic (Tithonian), Solnhofen Limestone, Bavaria, Germany
  - Omma brevipes (Deichmueller, 1886) = Pyrochroa brevipes
  - (?)Omma zitteli (Oppenheim, 1888) = Procarabus zitteli
- Lower Cretaceous (Aptian), Dzun-Bain Formation, Bon-Tsagan, Mongolia
  - (?)Omma antennatum Ponomarenko, 1997
  - Omma longicolle (Ponomarenko, 1997) = Tetraphalerus longicollis
- Mid Cretaceous (Albian-Cenomanian) Burmese amber, Myanmar
  - Omma davidbatteni Jarzembowski et al., 2020
  - Omma forte Li, Huang & Cai, 2021
  - Omma janetae Kirejtshuk, 2020
  - Omma lii Jarzembowski, Wang & Zheng, 2016
  - Omma manukyani (Kirejtshuk, 2020) formerly placed in separate genus Cionocups.
  - Omma (Coronomma) axsmithi Jarzembowski, Zheng & Zhao, 2022
- Other Species:
- (?)Omma altajense Ponomarenko, 1997, Middle to Late Jurassic, Togo-Khuduk Formation, Bakhar, Mongolia
- Omma avus Ponomarenko, 1969, Lower Jurassic (Hettangian), Dzhil Formation, Issyk-Kul’, Kyrgyzstan
- (?)Omma elongatum (Brodie, 1845) = Carabus elongatus, Lower Cretaceous (Berriasian), Purbeck Group Lower Cretaceous (Hauterivian), Weald Clay, United Kingdom
- (?)Omma gobiense Ponomarenko, 1997, Upper Jurassic (Tithonian), Ulan-Ereg Formation, Khoutiin-Khotgor, Mongolia
- Omma liassicum Crowson, 1962, Late Triassic (Rhaetian), Lilstock Formation, Brown's wood, Warwickshire, Lower Jurassic (Hettangian), Blue Lias, Binton, Warwickshire, Lower Jurassic (Sinemurian), Charmouth Mudstone, Charmouth, England
- Omma sibiricum Ponomarenko, 1966, Lower Cretaceous (Valanginian), Zaza Formation, Baissa, West Transbaikalia Russia
