= Coleoptera paleobiota of Burmese amber =

Fossil resin from the Hukawng Valley, Myanmar

Burmese amber is fossil resin dating to the early Late Cretaceous Cenomanian age recovered from deposits in the Hukawng Valley of northern Myanmar. It is known for being one of the most diverse Cretaceous age amber paleobiotas, containing rich arthropod fossils, along with uncommon vertebrate fossils and even rare marine inclusions. A mostly complete list of all taxa described up to the end of 2023 can be found in Ross (2024).

This article covers fossils classified as belonging to order Coleoptera, and its sub-orders Adephaga, Archostemata, Myxophaga, and Polyphaga.

== Adephaga ==
| Family | Genus | Species | Authority | Year described | Notes | image |
|---|---|---|---|---|---|---|
| Carabidae | Burmapseudomorphus | Burmapseudomorphus planus | Beutel et al. | 2020 | A pseudomorphine ground beetle. | |
| Carabidae | Cretoloricera | Cretoloricera electra | Liu et al. | 2023 | A loricerine ground beetle. | |
| Carabidae | Cretomigadops | Cretomigadops bidentatus | Liu | 2022 | A migadopine ground beetle. | |
| Carabidae | Cretomophron | Cretomophron mutilus | Rosova, Prokop & Beutel in Rosová et al. | 2023 | An omophronine ground beetle. | |
| Carabidae | Kryzhanovskiana | Kryzhanovskiana olegi | Kataev et al. | 2019 | A Metriini ant nest beetle. | |
| Carabidae | Loricera | Loricera carsteni | Li, Tihelka & Cai in Li et al. | 2024 | A species of Loricera. | |
| Carabidae | Oodes | Oodes kachinensis | Liu | 2014 | A ground beetle belonging to the tribe Oodini. | |
| Cicindelidae | Hujia | Hujia rolfi | Song, Jarzembowski & Xiao | 2022 | A tiger beetle belonging to the tribe Manticorini. | |
| Dytiscidae | Ambarticus | Ambarticus myanmaricus | Yang, Chen & Jia | 2019 | A diving beetle. | |
| Gyrinidae | Chimerogyrus | Chimerogyrus gigagalea | Gustafson, Michat & Balke | 2020 | A gyrinid whirligig beetle | |
| Gyrinidae | Cretodineutus | Cretodineutus rotundus | Liang et al. | 2020 | A gyrinine whirligig beetle | |
| Gyrinidae | Cretogyrus | Cretogyrus beuteli | Zhao et al. | 2019 | A whirligig beetle. | |

== Archostemata ==
| Family | Genus | Species | Authority | Year described | Notes | image |
|---|---|---|---|---|---|---|
| Cupedidae | Barbaticupes | Barbaticupes combertiae | Jarzembowski, Wang & Zheng | 2017 | A reticulated beetle. | |
| Cupedidae | Mallecupes | Mallecupes cheni | Wang et al. | 2023 | A reticulated beetle. | |
| Cupedidae | Mallecupes | Mallecupes cleevelyi | Jarzembowski, Wang & Zheng | 2017 | A reticulated beetle. | |
| Cupedidae | Mallecupes | Mallecupes prokini | Kirejtshuk | 2020 | A reticulated beetle, | |
| Cupedidae | Mallecupes | Mallecupes qingqingae | Jarzembowski, Wang & Zheng | 2016 | A reticulated beetle. | |
| Cupedidae | Mallecupes | Mallecupes zhangi | Song, Jarzembowski & Xiao | 2022 | A reticulated beetle, | |
| Cupedidae | Priacma | Priacma megapuncta | Li et al. | 2019 | A reticulated beetle. | |
| Micromalthidae | Protomalthus | Protomalthus burmaticus | Tihelka, Huang & Cai | 2019 | A telephone-pole beetle. | |
| Ommatidae | Bukhkalius | Bukhkalius lindae | (Jarzembowski, Wang & Zheng) | (2017) | An ommatine beetle. The species was first described as "Tetraphalerus" lindae. | |
| Ommatidae | Burmocoleus | Burmocoleus prisnyi | Kirejtshuk | 2020 | An ommatine beetle. | |
| Ommatidae | Burmocoleus | Burmocoleus zhiyuani | (Liu et al.) | 2017 | An ommatine beetle. First described as "Brochocoleus" zhiyuani. | |
| Ommatidae | Cionocups | Cionocups manukyani | Kirejtshuk | 2020 | An ommatine beetle. | |
| Ommatidae | Clessidromma | Clessidromma palmeri | Jarzembowski, Wang & Zheng | 2017 | An Ommatine beetle. | |
| Ommatidae | Echinocups | Echinocups denticollis | (Jiang et al.) | 2020 | An ommatine beetle. Originally described as "Notocupes" denticollis. | |
| Ommatidae | Echinocups | Echinocups neli | (Tihelka, Huang & Cai) | 2019 | An ommatine. Originally described as "Notocupes" neli. | |
| Ommatidae | Echinocups | Echinocups ohmkuhnlei | (Jarzembowski, Wang & Zheng) | 2020 | An ommatine beetle. Originally described as "Notocupes" ohmkuhnlei. | |
| Ommatidae | Jarzembowskiops | Jarzembowskiops caseyi | (Jarzembowski, Wang & Zheng) | 2020 | An ommatine beetle. First described as "Brochocoleus" caseyi. | |
| Ommatidae | Kirejtomma | Kirejtomma zengi | (Kirejtshuk) | 2020 | An ommatine beetle. First described as Clessidromma zengi. | |
| Ommatidae | Lepidomma | Lepidomma beuteli | Song, Jarzembowski & Xiao | 2022 | An ommatine beetle. | |
| Ommatidae | Lepidomma | Lepidomma jarzembowskii | Li et al. | 2020 | An ommatine beetle. | |
| Ommatidae | Lepidomma | Lepidomma longisquama | Li et al. | 2020 | An ommatine beetle. | |
| Ommatidae | Lepidomma | Lepidomma tianae | Jarzembowski, Wang & Zheng | 2019 | An ommatine beetle. Also known as Clessidromma tianae. | |
| Ommatidae | Miniomma | Miniomma chenkuni | Li, Yamamoto & Cai in Li et al. | 2020 | An ommatid beetle. | |
| Ommatidae | Omma | Omma davidbatteni | Jarzembowski, Wang & Zheng | 2020 | An ommatid beetle. | |
| Ommatidae | Omma | Omma janetae | Kirejtshuk | 2020 | An ommatid beetle. | |
| Ommatidae | Omma | Omma lii | Jarzembowski, Wang & Zheng | 2017 | An ommatid beetle. | |
| Ommatidae | Paraodontomma | Paraodontomma burmitica | Yamamoto | 2017 | A Brochocoleini Ommatid beetle. | |
| Ommatidae | Paraodontomma | Paraodontomma szwedoi | Jarzembowski, Wang & Zheng | 2018 | A Brochocoleini Ommatid beetle. | |
| Ommatidae | Polyakius | Polyakius alberti | Kirejtshuk | 2020 | An ommatine beetle. | |
| Ommatidae | Polyakius | Polyakius pubescens | Kirejtshuk | 2020 | An ommatine beetle. | |
| Ommatidae | Stegocoleus | Stegocoleus arkonus | Tihelka, Huang & Cai | 2020 | An ommatid beetle. | |
| Ommatidae | Stegocoleus | Stegocoleus caii | Jarzembowski & Wang | 2016 | An ommatid beetle. | |
| Ommatidae | Stegocoleus | Stegocoleus lawrencei | Tihelka, Huang & Cai | 2020 | An ommatid beetle. | |

== Myxophaga ==
| Family | Genus | Species | Authority | Year described | Notes | image |
|---|---|---|---|---|---|---|
| Lepiceridae | Lepiceratus | Lepiceratus ankylosaurus | Jałoszyński et al. | 2020 | A stem group lepicerid beetle. | |
| Lepiceridae | Lepicerus | Lepicerus georissoides | (Kirejtshuk and Poinar, 2006) | 2006 | A Lepicerid beetle. First named as Haplochelus georissoides Moved to Lepicerus georissoides (2017) | |
| Lepiceridae | Lepicerus | Lepicerus mumia | Jałoszyński & Yamamoto | 2017 | A Lepicerid beetle. | |
| Lepiceridae | Lepicerus | Lepicerus pretiosus | (Kirejtshuk & Poinar) | 2013 | A Lepicerid beetle, Originally described as "Lepiceroides" pretiosus. Moved from Lepichelus pretiosus (2017) | |
| Sphaeriusidae | Bezesporum | Bezesporum burmiticum | Fikáček et al. | 2022 | A sphaeriusid beetle. | |
| Sphaeriusidae | Bezesporum | Bezesporum huchengi | Li, Huang & Cai | 2024 | A sphaeriusid beetle. | |
| Sphaeriusidae | Burmasporum | Burmasporum rossi | Kirejtshuk | 2009 | A sphaeriusid beetle. | |
| Sphaeriusidae | Crowsonaerius | Crowsonaerius minutus | Li & Cai in Li et al. | 2023 | A sphaeriusid beetle. | |
| Sphaeriusidae | Sphaerius | Sphaerius martini | Li & Cai in Li et al. | 2023 | A sphaeriusid beetle. | |

== Polyphaga ==
| Taxon | Authority | Year described | Notes | image |
|---|---|---|---|---|
| Acalyptomerus thayerae | Cai & Lawrence in Cai et al. | 2019 | A fringe-winged beetle. | |
| Acalyptopygus astriatus | Clarke & Oberprieler in Clarke et al. | 2018 | An Aepyceratinae mesophyletid weevil. | |
| Acalyptopygus brevicornis | Clarke & Oberprieler in Clarke et al. | 2018 | An Aepyceratinae mesophyletid weevil. | |
| Acalyptopygus elongatus | Clarke & Oberprieler in Clarke et al. | 2018 | An Aepyceratinae mesophyletid weevil. | |
| Acalyptopygus lingziae | Clarke & Oberprieler in Clarke et al. | 2018 | An Aepyceratinae mesophyletid weevil. | |
| "Acmaeodera" burmitina | Cockerell | 1917 | An elaterid click beetle. | |
| Aepyceratus hyperochus | Poinar, Brown & Legalov | 2017 | An Aepyceratinae mesophyletid weevil. | |
| Alitrepanum aladelicatum | Peng et al. | 2022 | A member of the family Bostrichidae. Possibly a species of Poinarinius. | |
| Allostrophus cretaceus | Hsiao et al. | 2018 | A polypore fungus beetle. | |
| Allostrophus yangi | Hsiao | 2019 | A polypore fungus beetle. | |
| Alloterocucus atratus | Li, Leschen, Liu & Cai in Li et al. | 2022 | A member of Cucujoidea may be allied to the family Lamingtoniidae. | |
| Alveoderes yamamotoi | Li & Cai | 2024 | A member of the family Bothrideridae. | |
| Amberathyreus beuteli | Bai & Zhang | 2017 | An athyreine dor beetle | |
| Amberocula costata | Batelka, Engel, & Prokop | 2018 | A wedge-shaped beetle. | |
| Amberocula fallax | Batelka, Engel, & Prokop | 2018 | A wedge-shaped beetle. | |
| Amberocula muelleri | Batelka, Engel, & Prokop | 2018 | A wedge-shaped beetle. | |
| Amberophytum birmanicum | Yu, Ślipiński & Pang in Yu et al. | 2019 | A rare click beetle. | |
| Amberophytum maculatum | Poinar, Vega & Legalov | 2021 | A rare click beetle. | |
| Amplectister tenax | Caterino & Maddison | 2018 | A histerid clown beetle. | |
| Amplectister terapoides | Yamamoto & Caterino | 2022 | A histerid clown beetle. | |
| Anancites hukawngensis | (Chen & Zhang) | 2020 | A ship-timber beetle. Originally named Adamas hukawngensis. | |
| Anapleus kachinensis | Jiang, Caterino & Chen | 2022 | A species of Anapleus. | |
| Anchineus dolichobothris | Poinar & Brown | 2009 | A Mesophyletinae mesophyletid weevil. | |
| Anebomorpha cercorhampha | Poinar & Brown | 2020 | A clerid checkered beetle. | |
| Angimordella burmitina | Bao et al. | 2019 | A tumbling flower beetle. | |
| Angucharcotes thayerae | Li et al. | 2022 | A rove beetle belonging to the subfamily Phloeocharinae. | |
| Anisoodontus qizhihaoi | Wu et al. | 2022 | A stag beetle. | |
| Anisoodontus xiafangyuani | Wu et al. | 2022 | A stag beetle. | |
| Anoeuma lawrencei | Li, Kundrata & Cai in Li et al. | 2021 | An elateroid click beetle of uncertain phylogenetic placement. | |
| Anomocephalobus liuhaoi | Li, Jäch & Cai in Li et al. | 2022 | A member of the family Limnichidae belonging to the subfamily Cephalobyrrhinae. | |
| Anthrenus larvalis | Cockerell | 1917 | A megatomine Dermestid beetle. Originally named Dermestes larvalis. | |
| Aphebodactyla rhetine | Chatzimanolis, Cashion, Engel & Falin | 2012 | A toe-winged beetle. | |
| Aphelonyssus latus | Clarke & Oberprieler in Clarke et al. | 2018 | A Mesophyletinae mesophyletid weevil. | |
| Apophisandra ammytae | Molino-Olmedo | 2017 | A parandrine longhorn beetle, an apophisandrid beetle or a sap beetle. | |
| Apotomoura fortiscrura | Bao et al. | 2018 | An apotomourid or mordellid beetle. | |
| Archaenosodendron angulare | Li & Cai in Li et al. | 2021 | A wounded-tree beetle. | |
| Archaenosodendron cretaceum | Deng et al. | 2019 | A wounded-tree beetle. Originally described as Nosodendron cretaceum. | |
| Archaenosodendron explanatum | Li & Cai in Li et al. | 2021 | A wounded-tree beetle. | |
| Archaenosodendron remotidens | Li & Cai in Li et al. | 2021 | A wounded-tree beetle. | |
| Archaeodraena cretacea | Jäch & Yamamoto | 2017 | A minute moss beetle. | |
| Archaeomalthodes rosetta | Hsiao et al. | 2017 | A malthinine soldier beetle | |
| Archaeozenodosus bellus | Yu & Kolibač | 2017 | A thaneroclerid checkered beetle. | |
| Archemastax divida | Yin et al. | 2019 | An ant-like stone beetle. | |
| Attagenus coziki | Háva | 2023 | An attagenine carpet beetle. | |
| Attagenus lundi | Háva & Damgaard | 2017 | An attagenine carpet beetle. | |
| Attagenus secundus | Deng et al. | 2017 | An attagenine carpet beetle. | |
| Basinosa pengweii | Tihelka, Huang & Cai | 2020 | A wounded-tree beetle. | |
| Benemerita burmitica | Molino-Olmedo | 2025 | A ptinid beetle. | |
| Bifurderum donoghuei | Cheng et al. | 2020 | A cylindrical bark beetle. | |
| Bifurderum minutum | Cheng et al. | 2020 | A cylindrical bark beetle. | |
| Bipogonia fortis | Li, Kundrata & Cai in Li et al. | 2022 | A member of the family Artematopodidae. | |
| Bipogonia trivialis | Li, Kundrata & Cai in Li et al. | 2022 | A member of the family Artematopodidae. | |
| Boreotethys arctopteryx | Parker | 2016 | A Pselaphinae rove beetle. | |
| Boreotethys grimaldii | Parker | 2016 | A Pselaphinae rove beetle. | |
| Bowangius cyclops | Clarke & Oberprieler in Clarke et al. | 2018 | A Mesophyletinae mesophyletid weevil. | |
| Bowangius glabratus | Clarke & Oberprieler in Clarke et al. | 2018 | A Mesophyletinae mesophyletid weevil. | |
| Bowangius tanaops | Clarke & Oberprieler in Clarke et al. | 2018 | A Mesophyletinae mesophyletid weevil. | |
| Bowangius zhenuai | Clarke & Oberprieler in Clarke et al. | 2018 | A Mesophyletinae mesophyletid weevil. | |
| Brachycerophytum cretaceum | Yu, Ślipiński & Pang | 2019 | A rare click beetle. | |
| Brevipterus abtusiapicis | Zhao et al. | 2022 | A soldier beetle. | |
| Brevipterus acutiapicis | Zhao et al. | 2022 | A soldier beetle. | |
| Brevipterus megacephalus | Zhao et al. | 2022 | A soldier beetle. | |
| Brevipterus strungei | (Fanti & Damgaard) | 2019 | A soldier beetle. Originally described as Sanaungulus strungei. | |
| Bulasconotus carinisternus | Li, Ślipiński & Cai in Li et al. | 2024 | A member of the family Zopheridae. | |
| Burmacateres longicoxa | Kolibáč & Peris | 2020 | A lophocaterid beetle. | |
| Burmagluta rougemonti | Yin & Cai | 2021 | A rove beetle belonging to the subfamily Pselaphinae and the tribe Brachyglutini. | |
| Burmagrilus cretacus | Jiang, Song & Wang in Jiang et al. | 2021 | A member of the family Buprestidae. | |
| Burmahelota pengweii | Liu et al. | 2019 | A helotid beetle. | |
| Burmalachius acroantennatus | Tshernyshev & Legalov | 2023 | A member of the subfamily Malachiinae and the tribe Malachiini. | |
| Burmalestes albertalleni | Tomaszewska & Ślipiński in Tomaszewska et al. | 2018 | An endomychid handsome fungus beetle. | |
| Burmalestes jingruoyaae | Li & Caiin Li, Huang & Cai | 2023 | An endomychid handsome fungus beetle. | |
| Burmaphagus yamamotoae | Yamamoto & Perreau | 2025 | A member of the family Leiodidae | |
| Burmitoma nalae | Batelka, Engel & Prokop | 2018 | A wedge-shaped beetle. | |
| Burmochares groehni | Kirejtshuk & Prokin | 2022 | A member of the family Limnichidae belonging to the subfamily Limnichinae. | |
| Burmocorynus jarzembowskii | Legalov | 2018 | A Mesophyletinae mesophyletid weevil. | |
| Burmocorynus longus | Clarke & Oberprieler in Clarke et al. | 2018 | A Mesophyletinae mesophyletid weevil. | |
| Burmolycus compactus | Bocak, Li & Ellenberger | 2019 | A dexorine net-winged beetle. | |
| Burmomacer kirejtshuki | Legalov | 2018 | A Nemonychidae weevil. | |
| Burmomiles angustipennis | Yang, Zhao & Liu | 2024 | A soldier beetle | |
| Burmomiles bilineatimaculatus | Yang et al. | 2021 | A soldier beetle. Possibly a species of Elektrokleinia. | |
| Burmomiles blixenae | Fanti & Damgaard | 2019 | A soldier beetle | |
| Burmomiles brevicollis | Yang, Zhao & Liu | 2024 | A soldier beetle | |
| Burmomiles dentatus | Yang, Zhao & Liu | 2024 | A soldier beetle | |
| Burmomiles dominikiweissbachi | (Fanti & Müller) | 2022 | A soldier beetle. Originally described as Sanaungulus dominikiweissbachi. | |
| Burmomiles ellenbergeri | (Fanti & Damgaard) | 2020 | A soldier beetle. Originally described as Poinarelektronmiles ellenbergeri. | |
| Burmomiles kachinensis | (Fanti & Müller) | 2022 | A soldier beetle. Originally described as Sanaungulus kachinensis. | |
| Burmomiles laticollis | Yang et al. | 2021 | A soldier beetle. | |
| Burmomiles lethi | (Fanti & Damgaard) | 2020 | A soldier beetle. Originally described as Sanaungulus lethi. | |
| Burmomiles oblongoculus | Yang et al. | 2021 | A soldier beetle. Possibly a species of Elektrokleinia. | |
| Burmomiles parisii | Fanti & Müller | 2022 | A soldier beetle | |
| Burmomiles recticollis | Yang, Zhao & Liu | 2024 | A soldier beetle | |
| Burmomiles volpei | Fanti & Müller | 2022 | A soldier beetle | |
| Burmomiles willerslevorum | Fanti, Damgaard & Ellenberger | 2018 | A soldier beetle. | |
| Burmonyx zigrasi | David & Engel | 2014 | A nemonychid weevil | |
| Burmophyletis beloides | (Clarke & Oberprieler) in Clarke et al. | 2018 | An Aepyceratinae mesophyletid weevil. Originally described as "Platychirus" beloides. | |
| Burmophysorhinus dusaneki | Kundrata, Triskova & Prosvirov | 2023 | An elaterid click beetle. | |
| Burmops neli | Kirejtshuk, Willig & Chetverikov | 2019 | A protosphindine sphindid beetle. | |
| Burmorhinus georgei | Legalov | 2018 | A Mesophyletinae mesophyletid weevil. | |
| Burmorhinus setosus | Clarke & Oberprieler in Clarke et al. | 2018 | A Mesophyletinae mesophyletid weevil. | |
| Burmostrichus brunneus | Háva & Zahradník | 2025 | A member of the family Bostrichidae. | |
| Calyptocis brevirostris | Clarke & Oberprieler in Clarke et al. | 2018 | An Aepyceratinae mesophyletid weevil. | |
| Captopus depressiceps | Li & Cai in Li, Huang & Cai | 2021 | A throscid beetle. | |
| Carinibipogonia xiai | Li, Kundrata & Cai in Li et al. | 2022 | A member of the family Artematopodidae. | |
| Carinumerus intricatus | Caterino & Yamamoto | 2023 | A clown beetle. | |
| Carinumerus maddisoni | Caterino | 2021 | A member of the family Histeridae belonging to the subfamily Onthophilinae. | |
| Cascomastigus minor | Yin, Cai & Huang | 2018 | A Scydmaeninae rove beetle. | |
| Cedasyrus dimorphus | Yin & Cai in Yin et al. | 2020 | A dasycerine rove beetle. | |
| Cenomana annieae | Hsiao & Otto | 2024 | | |
| Cenomana brevicornis | Muona | 2020 | A dirhagine melasine false click beetle. The article naming the species used the spelling Coenomana brevicornis. | |
| Cenomana clavata | Otto | 2019 | A dirhagine melasine false click beetle. | |
| Cenomana grandis | Han et al. | 2024 | | |
| Cenomaniola carinata | Jałoszyński & Yamamoto | 2017 | A glandulariine ant-like stone beetle. | |
| Cenomaniola macrophthalma | Jałoszyński & Yamamoto | 2017 | A glandulariine ant-like stone beetle. | |
| Ceracyclus jirouxi | Boucher, Bai & Montreui | 2017 | A ceracycline aulacocycline bess beetle. | |
| Ceracyclus lotus | Boucher, Bai & Montreui | 2017 | A ceracycline aulacocycline bess beetle. | |
| Cetionyx batiatus | Clarke & Oberprieler in Clarke et al. | 2018 | A Mesophyletinae mesophyletid weevil. | |
| Cetionyx terebrans | Clarke & Oberprieler in Clarke et al. | 2018 | A Mesophyletinae mesophyletid weevil. | |
| Cetionyx ursinus | Clarke & Oberprieler in Clarke et al. | 2018 | A Mesophyletinae mesophyletid weevil. | |
| Cerophytum albertalleni | Yu, Ślipiński & Pang | 2019 | A rare click beetle. | |
| Clidicostigus arachnipes | Jałoszyński, Brunke & Bai | 2017 | A mastigine ant-like stone beetle. | |
| Clidicus archaicus | (Cai & Huang) | 2016 | A scydmaenine rove beetle. First published as "Cretoleptochromus" archaicus. | |
| Colon burmiticum | Yamamoto in Yamamoto & Takahashi | 2018 | A Coloninae round fungus beetle. | |
| Colonellus burmiticus | Cai & Huang | 2017 | A Coloninae round fungus beetle. | |
| Compsopsarus reneae | Clarke & Oberprieler in Clarke et al. | 2018 | A Mesophyletinae mesophyletid weevil. | |
| Coomania enkarsios | Jenkins Shaw et al. | 2022 | A rove beetle belonging to the subfamily Coomaniinae. | |
| Coomania megistos | Jenkins Shaw et al. | 2022 | A rove beetle belonging to the subfamily Coomaniinae. | |
| Coomania yini | Jenkins Shaw et al. | 2022 | A rove beetle belonging to the subfamily Coomaniinae. | |
| Cornuturetes elaphus | Peris et al. | 2024 | A sap beetle. | |
| Coslonatus rasnitsyni | Li & Cai in Li, Huang & Cai | 2021 | A member of the family Zopheridae possibly belonging to the subfamily Colydiinae. | |
| Crenossidium slipinskii | Li, Newton & Cai in Li et al. | 2022 | A member of the family Ptiliidae. | |
| Cretabaltoraea volsella | Peris, Jelínek & Audisio in Peris et al. | 2024 | A sap beetle belonging to the subfamily Apophisandrinae. | |
| Cretaceocoleus saetosus | Tihelka, Kundrata & Cai in Tihelka et al. | 2022 | A member of Dryopoidea belonging to the family Mastigocoleidae. | |
| Cretaceoripidius burmiticus | (Cockerell) | 1917 | A ripidiini ripidiine wedge shaped beetle. Originally described as "Myodites" burmiticus, moved from "Ripiphorus" burmiticus. | |
| Cretagyrtodes glabratus | Cai & Huang | 2017 | An agyrtodine Camiarinae round fungus beetle is C. . | |
| Cretaidgia burmensis | Zhao, Liu & Yu in Zhao et al. | 2021 | A prionocerid beetle. | |
| Cretakarenni birmanicus | Peris & Delclòs | 2015 | A monotomid beetle. | |
| Cretakarenni shaoi | Li & Cai in Li, Huang & Cai | 2022 | A monotomid beetle. | |
| Cretanapleus seideli | Simon Pražák & Lackner in Simon Pražák et al. | 2023 | A clown beetle. | |
| Cretaparamecus angustus | Arriaga-Varela et al. | 2023 | A handsome fungus beetle. | |
| Cretaparamecus crassipes | Arriaga-Varela et al. | 2023 | A handsome fungus beetle. | |
| Cretaparamecus tarsalis | Tomaszewska, Ślipiński, Bai & Zhang in Tomaszewska et al. | 2018 | A handsome fungus beetle. | |
| Cretaparamecus uncinus | Arriaga-Varela et al. | 2023 | A handsome fungus beetle. | |
| Cretaretes minimus | Peris & Jelínek | 2020 | A kateretid short-winged flower beetle, an apophisandrid beetle or a sap beetle. | |
| Cretasernus spinosus | Peris et al. | 2019 | A ptinid beetle. | |
| Cretoattagenus coziki | Háva | 2020 | An attagenine carpet beetle. | |
| Cretoboganium gei | Cai & Huang | 2019 | A boganiine beetle. | |
| Cretobrachygluta laurasiensis | Yin et al. | 2019 | A brachyglutine pselaphine rove beetle. | |
| Cretobythus excavatus | Yin, Parker & Cai | 2017 | A stem-bythinine pselaphine rove beetle. | |
| Cretocantharis veda | Hsiao et al. | 2021 | A soldier beetle. | |
| Cretocardiophorus laminatus | Qiu & Ruan | 2023 | An elaterid click beetle. | |
| Cretochirus newtoni | Yamamoto | 2019 | A leptochirine osoriine rove beetle. | |
| Cretocrenis burmanicus | Fikáček et al. | 2017 | A water scavenger beetle. | |
| Cretoctesis conchimillanae | Molino-Olmedo | 2023 | A member of the family Buprestidae. | |
| Cretocydistus wittmeri | Roza et al. | 2023 | A member of the family Phengodidae. | |
| Cretodeinopsis aenigmatica | Cai & Huang | 2015 | An aleocharine rove beetle. | |
| Cretodermestes palpalis | Deng et al. | 2017 | An attagenine carpet beetle. | |
| Cretognathus minutissimus | Yamamoto | 2023 | A stag beetle. | |
| Cretohlezkus alleni | Jałoszyński | 2019 | A plate-thigh beetle. | |
| Cretohypsilara parva | Cai, Maier & Huang | 2018 | A riffle beetle. | |
| Cretolenax carinatus | Liu, Tihelka, McElrath & Yamamoto | 2020 | A monotomid minute clubbed beetle | |
| Cretolenax diabolus | Tihelka, Liu, McElrath & Yamamoto | 2020 | A monotomid minute clubbed beetle | |
| Cretoleptochromus burmiticus | Yin et al. | 2017 | An ant-like stone beetle. | |
| Cretolestes niger | Tomaszewska, Ślipiński & Ren in Tomaszewska et al. | 2018 | A handsome fungus beetle. | |
| Cretolgus minimus | Legalov & Háva | 2020 | A polycaonine auger beetle. | |
| Cretoliota cornutus | Liu et al. | 2019 | A silvan flat bark beetle. | |
| Cretolycus praecursor | Tihelka, Huang & Cai | 2019 | A net-winged beetle. | |
| Cretomalus tibiodentatus | Simon-Pražák et al. | 2024 | A member of the family Histeridae belonging to the subfamily Dendrophilinae. | |
| Cretomegatoma atypica | (Deng et al.) | 2017 | A Megatomine carpet beetle. Originally described as Megatoma atypica. | |
| Cretomysteria burmanica | Denget al. | 2017 | A colydiine ironclad beetle. | |
| Cretonthophilus tuberculatus | Caterino, Wolf-Schwenninger & Bechly | 2015 | A clown beetle. | |
| Cretopachyderes burmitinus | Hsiao et al. | 2021 | A click beetle belonging to the subfamily Agrypninae. | |
| Cretoparacucujus cycadophilus | Cai & Escalona in Cai et al. | 2018 | A Paracucujinae boganiid beetle. | |
| Cretophengodes azari | Li, Kundrata, Tihelka & Cai in Cai et al. | 2021 | A member of Elateroidea belonging to the family Cretophengodidae. | |
| Cretopityobius pankowskiorum | Otto | 2019 | A pityobiine click beetle. | |
| Cretoprocirrus trichotos | Jenkins Shaw & Żyła in Jenkins Shaw et al. | 2020 | A Pinophilini rove beetle. | |
| Cretoprostominia myanmarensis | Jiang, Liu & Chen | 2024 | A member of the family Salpingidae. | |
| Cretopsectra pulchra | Zhao et al. | 2020 | A brachypsectrid Texas beetle. | |
| Cretopseudopsis maweii | Liu et al. | 2020 | A pseudopsine rove beetle. | |
| Cretoptomaphagus microsoma | Bao & Antunes-Carvalho | 2020 | A cholevine round fungus beetle. | |
| Cretoquadratus engeli | Chen | 2019 | A ship-timber beetle. | |
| Cretorhadalus constantini | Kolibáč & Prokop in Kolibáč et al. | 2023 | A member of Cleroidea, possibly belonging to the family Rhadalidae. | |
| Cretostenotarsus striatus | Tomaszewska, Szawaryn & Arriaga-Varela | 2022 | A member of the family Endomychidae. | |
| Cretosynstrophus archaicus | Cai, Hsiao & Huang | 2016 | A Eustrophinae polypore fungus beetle. | |
| Cretotrichopsenius burmiticus | Cai et al. | 2017 | A Trichopseniine Aleocharine rove beetle. | |
| Cretozenodosus fossilis | Cai & Huang | 2018 | A Zenodosinae thaneroclerid checkered beetle. | |
| Cryphalites rugosissimus | Cockerell | 1917 | A colydiine iron-clad beetle | |
| Cupressicharis elongatus | Muona | 2020 | A palaeoxenine false click beetle. | |
| Cylus carinifer | Muona | 2020 | A eucnemine false click beetle. | |
| Cyrtocis gibbus | Clarke & Oberprieler in Clarke et al. | 2018 | A Mesophyletinae mesophyletid weevil. | |
| Dactylonudon longitarsus | Janák | 2024 | A rove beetle belonging to the subfamily Paederinae. | |
| Dariuszelater tarnawskii | Zhao, Shih & Ren | 2022 | A click beetle. | |
| Debbia gracilirostris | Clarke & Oberprieler in Clarke et al. | 2018 | A Mesophyletinae mesophyletid weevil. | |
| Delteredolaemus hei | Li & Cai in Li, Huang & Cai | 2022 | A member of the family Teredidae. | |
| Derolathrus abyssus | Yamamoto, Takahashi & Parker | 2017 | A Jacobsoniid beetle. | |
| Dictyorachys callidictyus | Li, Volkovitsh & Cai in Li et al. | 2023 | A member of the family Buprestidae. | |
| Diminudon kachinensis | Żyła, Yamamoto & Shaw | 2019 | A paederine rove beetle | |
| Diminudon schomannae | Żyła, Yamamoto & Shaw | 2019 | A paederine rove beetle | |
| Diopsiretes corniger | Peris et al. | 2024 | A sap beetle. | |
| Ditysparedrus gigas | Vitali & Legalov | 2020 | A false blister beetle. | |
| Ditysparedrus obscurus | Vitali & Legalov | 2020 | A false blister beetle. | |
| Ditysparedrus serixioides | Vitali & Legalov | 2020 | A false blister beetle. | |
| Ditysparedrus uniformis | Vitali & Legalov | 2020 | A false blister beetle. | |
| Druantia aeterna | Caterino | 2021 | A member of the family Histeridae belonging to the subfamily Dendrophilinae. | |
| Echogomphus viridescens | Clarke & Oberprieler in Clarke et al. | 2018 | A Mesophyletinae mesophyletid weevil. | |
| Ektatotricha paradoxa | Chatzimanolis, Engel & Newton | 2010 | An ant-like stone beetle | |
| "Elater" burmitinus | Cockerell | 1917 | An elaterid click beetle. | |
| Electraesalopsis beuteli | Bai, Zhang & Qiu | 2017 | A stag beetle. | |
| Electroatopos castaneus | Chatzimanolis, Engel & Newton | 2010 | An ant-like stone beetle | |
| Electrocis dentitibialis | Clarke & Oberprieler in Clarke et al. | 2018 | A Mesophyletinae mesophyletid weevil. | |
| Electrorubesopsis beuteli | Bai & Wang in Li et al. | 2018 | An Electrorubesopsinae scarab beetle. | |
| Electrothroscus yanpingae | Li & Cai in Li, Huang & Cai | 2021 | A throscid beetle. | |
| Electroxyra cretacea | (Wu, Li & Ding) | 2018 | A sooty mould beetle. Originally described as "Cyclaxyra" cretacea. | |
| Electrumeretes birmanicus | Peris & Jelínek | 2019 | A short-winged flower beetle, an apophisandrid beetle or a sap beetle. | |
| Elektrokleinia picta | Ellenberger & Fanti | 2019 | A soldier beetle. | |
| Elektrokleinia steffenseni | Fanti & Damgaard | 2020 | A soldier beetle. | |
| Elektrokleinia thiloi | Fanti & Müller | 2022 | A soldier beetle. | |
| Elektrokleinia zahradniki | Fanti & Müller | 2022 | A soldier beetle. | |
| Eleusis sulcata | Yamamoto | 2023 | A species of Eleusis. | |
| Elongatus kachinus | Wang et al. | 2024 | A member of the family Bostrichidae belonging to the subfamily Dinoderinae. | |
| Eodrias mandibularis | Batelka & Prokop | 2023 | A wedge-shaped beetle. | |
| Epiphanis burmensis | Muona | 2020 | A species of Epiphanis. | |
| Erichia cretacea | Yu et al. | 2018 | A minute marsh-loving beetle. | |
| Eucinetus debilispinus | Li & Cai in Li et al. | 2024 | A plate-thigh beetle. | |
| Eucinetus panghongae | Li & Cai in Li et al. | 2024 | A plate-thigh beetle. | |
| Eucinetus parvus | Du et al. | 2020 | A plate-thigh beetle. | |
| Eucinetus zhenhuai | Li & Cai in Li et al. | 2024 | A plate-thigh beetle. | |
| Euryepomus lophomerus | Clarke & Oberprieler in Clarke et al. | 2018 | A Mesophyletinae mesophyletid weevil. | |
| 'Eurygenius' wickhami | Cockerell | 1917 | A tenebrionoid beetle of uncertain placement. | |
| Euryptychus acutangulus | Muona | 2020 | A macraulacine false click beetle. | |
| Euryptychus burmensis | Muona | 2020 | A macraulacine false click beetle. | |
| Euryptychus elegantulus | Muona | 2020 | A macraulacine false click beetle. | |
| Euryptychus mysticus | Muona | 2020 | A macraulacine false click beetle. | |
| Excavotarsus lini | Li et al. | 2020 | A heterocerid variegated mud-loving beetle. | |
| Excavotarsus minor | Li et al. | 2020 | A heterocerid variegated mud-loving beetle. | |
| Falsothambus burmensis | Muona | 2020 | A eucnemine false click beetle. | |
| Falsothambus gracilicornis | Muona | 2020 | A eucnemine false click beetle. | |
| Festenus gracilis | Żyła et al. | 2017 | A Stenine rove beetle. | |
| Festenus robustus | Żyła et al. | 2017 | A Stenine rove beetle. | |
| Fiegelia antennata | Muona | 2020 | A false click beetle. | |
| Fiegelia gracilis | Han, Muona & Ren | 2024 | A false click beetle. | |
| Fiegelia longicornis | Han, Muona & Ren | 2024 | A false click beetle. | |
| Fiegelia serraticornis | Han, Muona & Ren | 2024 | A false click beetle. | |
| Fiegelia tarsalis | Muona | 2020 | A false click beetle. | |
| Flabellotoma heidiae | Batelka, Prokop & Engel | 2016 | A Pelecotominae wedge shaped beetle. | |
| Flammarionella hehaikuni | Cai, Ballantyne & Kundrata in Cai et al. | 2024 | A firefly belonging to the stem group of the subfamily Luciolinae. | |
| Foveapeltis rutai | Li, Kolibáč, Liu & Cai in Li et al. | 2024 | A member Cleroidea of uncertain affinities. | |
| Furcalabratum burmanicum | Poinar & Brown | 2018 | A short-winged flower beetle, an apophisandrid beetle or a sap beetle. | |
| Glaresis burmitica | Cai & Huang | 2018 | An enigmatic scarab beetle. | |
| Glyphonotum hsiaoi | Li et al. | 2024 | A member Tenebrionoidea with possible affinities with the family Pythidae. | |
| Gnomus brevis | Clarke & Oberprieler in Clarke et al. | 2018 | A Mesophyletinae mesophyletid weevil. | |
| Gnomus spinipes | Clarke & Oberprieler in Clarke et al. | 2018 | A Mesophyletinae mesophyletid weevil. | |
| Gollandia planata | Makranczy, Yamamoto & Engel | 2018 | A Coprophilini Oxytelinae rove beetle. | |
| Gracilenticrus burmiticus | Yu, Kolibáč & Ślipiński in Yu et al. | 2021 | A member of the family Lophocateridae. | |
| Granulobium whitei | Li, Philips & Cai in Li et al. | 2023 | A ptinid beetle. | |
| Grzymalia wukong | Bao et al. | 2022 | A member of the family Aderidae. | |
| Guillermorhinus longitarsis | Clarke & Oberprieler in Clarke et al. | 2018 | A nemonychid weevil | |
| Habropezus kimpulleni | Clarke & Oberprieler in Clarke et al. | 2018 | A Mesophyletinae mesophyletid weevil. | |
| Habropezus ncoxatirostris | Clarke & Oberprieler in Clarke et al. | 2018 | A Mesophyletinae mesophyletid weevil. | |
| Habropezus plaisiommus | Poinar, Brown & Legalov in Legalov | 2023 | A Mesophyletinae mesophyletid weevil. | |
| Habropezus tenuicornis | Clarke & Oberprieler in Clarke et al. | 2018 | A Mesophyletinae mesophyletid weevil. | |
| Hapsomela burmitis | Poinar & Brown | 2004 | An ant-like stone beetle | |
| Hapsomela minor | Yin | 2020 | An ant-like stone beetle. | |
| Hapsomela tibialis | Yin | 2020 | An ant-like stone beetle. | |
| Homalenchodes jarzembowskii | Li, Hsiao, Yoshitomi & Cai in Li et al. | 2022 | A member of the family Melandryidae. | |
| Hongipsectra electrella | Tihelka, Huang & Cai | 2019 | A Texas beetle. | |
| Hukawngichthyurus barsevskisi | Fanti & Müller | 2022 | A soldier beetle. | |
| Hukawngichthyurus ditaddeoi | Fanti & Müller | 2022 | A soldier beetle. | |
| Hukawngichthyurus kyawkhaingwini | Fanti & Ellenberger | 2018 | A soldier beetle. | |
| Hukawngichthyurus maha | Hsiao et al. | 2021 | A soldier beetle. | |
| Hukawngius crassipes | Clarke & Oberprieler in Clarke et al. | 2018 | A Mesophyletinae mesophyletid weevil. | |
| Hybosorus ocampoi | Bai & Zhang in Bai et al. | 2016 | A scavenger scarab beetle. | |
| Isocryptophilus exilipunctus | Li & Cai in Li et al. | 2024 | A possible member of the superfamily Erotyloidea. | |
| Jenibuntor pusillus | Muona | 2020 | A macraulacine false click beetle. | |
| Kachinus antennatus | Chatzimanolis, Engel & Newton | 2010 | An ant-like stone beetle | |
| Kekveus brevisulcatus | Li et al. | 2023 | A featherwing beetle. | |
| Kekveus jason | Yamamoto, Grebennikov & Takahashi | 2018 | A featherwing beetle. | |
| Kresnikus beynoni | Tihelka, Huang & Cai | 2019 | A hide beetle. | |
| Kuafu borealis | Yin et al. | 2018 | A stem group Scydmaenini ant-like stone beetle. | |
| Kulindrobor enigmaticus | Tihelka et al. | 2021 | A tenebrionoid beetle of uncertain phylogenetic placement. | |
| Kulindrobor magnus | Tihelka et al. | 2021 | A tenebrionoid beetle of uncertain phylogenetic placement. | |
| Kupakara luminosus | Chen et al. | 2023 | A rove beetle belonging to the subfamily Oxytelinae. | |
| Kupakara makranczyi | Chen et al. | 2023 | A rove beetle belonging to the subfamily Oxytelinae. | |
| Lemodicarmenia olmedoae | Molino-Olmedo | 2017 | A Lemodine ant-like flower beetle. | |
| Lenax karenae | Liu, Tihelka, McElrath & Yamamoto | 2020 | A monotomid minute clubbed beetle | |
| Leptopezus barbatus | Clarke & Oberprieler in Clarke et al. | 2018 | A Mesophyletinae Mesophyletidae weevil. | |
| Leptopezus rastellipes | Clarke & Oberprieler in Clarke et al. | 2018 | A Mesophyletinae Mesophyletidae weevil. | |
| Lobatihelota iridescens | Li, Liu & Cai in Li et al. | 2023 | A member of the family Helotidae. | |
| Lobatihelota lescheni | Li, Liu & Cai in Li et al. | 2023 | A member of the family Helotidae. | |
| Loeblitoides latus | Jałoszyński & Szawaryn | 2024 | | |
| Loeblitoides separatus | Jałoszyński | 2020 | A Stenichnini ant-like stone beetle. | |
| Longicrusa jaracimrmani | Tihelka, Huang & Cai | 2019 | A false darkling beetle. | |
| Louwiocis megalops | Clarke & Oberprieler in Clarke et al. | 2018 | A Mesophyletinae mesophyletid weevil. | |
| Mastigocoleus resinicola | Tihelka & Cai in Tihelka et al. | 2022 | A member of Dryopoidea belonging to the family Mastigocoleidae. | |
| Megabythinus spinitibialis | Yin, Zhao & Cai | 2021 | A rove beetle belonging to the subfamily Pselaphinae. | |
| Megalopinus extinctus | Yamamoto & Solodovnikov | 2016 | A Megalopsidiinae rove beetle. | |
| Mekorhamphus beatae | Clarke & Oberprieler in Clarke et al. | 2018 | A Mesophyletinae mesophyletid weevil. | |
| Mekorhamphus gracilipes | Clarke & Oberprieler in Clarke et al. | 2018 | A Mesophyletinae mesophyletid weevil. | |
| Mekorhamphus gyralommus | Poinar, Brown & Legalov in Legalov | 2023 | A Mesophyletinae mesophyletid weevil. | |
| Mekorhamphus poinari | Clarke & Oberprieler in Clarke et al. | 2018 | A Mesophyletinae mesophyletid weevil. | |
| Mekorhamphus tenuicornis | Clarke & Oberprieler in Clarke et al. | 2018 | A Mesophyletinae mesophyletid weevil. | |
| Melalgus cretaceus | Háva | 2024 | A species of Melalgus. | |
| Melanosiagon serraticornis | Batelka & Prokop | 2021 | A member of the family Ripiphoridae. | |
| Mesallotrochus longiantennatus | Cai & Huang | 2015 | An osoriine rove beetle. | |
| Mesernobius anawrahtai | Engel | 2010 | A Mesernobiine marsh beetle | |
| Mesohelotopsis monochromata | (Liu et al.) | 2019 | A helotid beetle. Originally described as Metahelotella monochromata. | |
| Mesolophocateres pengweii | Yu, Leschen & Ślipiński in Yu et al. | 2020 | A lophocaterid beetle. Possibly a junior synonym of Burmacateres longicoxa. | |
| Mesonosa scandens | Tihelka et al. | 2021 | A member of the family Nosodendridae. | |
| Mesopassandra keyao | Jin et al. | 2019 | A mesopassandrine parasitic flat beetle. | |
| Mesophyletis calhouni | Poinar | 2006 | A Mesophyletinae mesophyletid weevil. | |
| Mesosmicrips cretacea | (Cai & Huang) | 2016 | A palmetto beetle. Originally described as "Smicrips" cretacea. | |
| Mesosmicrips sunae | Lyubarsky & Perkovsky in Lyubarsky et al. | 2023 | A palmetto beetle. | |
| Mesosymbion compactus | Yamamoto, Maruyama & Parker | 2016 | A Mesoporini aleocharine rove beetle. | |
| Microborus inertus | Cognato & Grimaldi | 2009 | A hexacoline scolytine weevil. | |
| Microentomus epibatus | Poinar in Poinar & Brown | 2014 | A blister beetle. | |
| Micropeplus pengweii | Jiang, Peng & Wang | 2020 | A micropepline rove beetle. | |
| Microtrogossita qizhihaoi | Li & Cai in Li et al. | 2021 | A member of the family Trogossitidae. | |
| Miculissima excavata | Simon-Pražák et al. | 2024 | A member of the family Histeridae. | |
| Midinudon elongatus | Janák | 2024 | A rove beetle belonging to the subfamily Paederinae. | |
| Midinudon juvenis | Tokareva & Żyła in Tokareva et al. | 2023 | A rove beetle belonging to the subfamily Paederinae. | |
| Molinernobius fuentesi | Molino-Olmedo | 2017 | An ernobiine ptinid beetle. | |
| Multispinus multispinosus | Bao et al. | 2018 | An apotomourid or mordellid beetle. | |
| Multispinus parvus | Bao | 2020 | An apotomourid or mordellid beetle. | |
| Muonabuntor grandinotalis | Li et al. | 2020 | A false click beetle. | |
| Murcybolus longiantennus | Li & Cai in Li et al. | 2021 | A dexorine net-winged beetle belonging to the tribe Burmolycini. | |
| Myall burmensis | Muona | 2020 | A eucnemine false click beetle. | |
| Myall ovata | Han, Muona & Ren | 2024 | A eucnemine false click beetle. | |
| Myamalycocerus vitalii | Fanti & Ellenberger | 2017 | A soldier beetle. | |
| Myanmarops gatiosus | Legalov, Kirejtshuk & Anokhin | 2020 | A seed beetle | |
| Myanmarus caviventris | Clarke & Oberprieler in Clarke et al. | 2018 | A Mesophyletinae mesophyletid weevil. | |
| Myanmarus dentifer | Clarke & Oberprieler in Clarke et al. | 2018 | A Mesophyletinae mesophyletid weevil. | |
| Myanmarus diversiunguis | Clarke & Oberprieler in Clarke et al. | 2018 | A Mesophyletinae mesophyletid weevil. | |
| Myanmarus robustus | Clarke & Oberprieler in Clarke et al. | 2018 | A Mesophyletinae mesophyletid weevil. | |
| Mysteriomorphus pelevini | Alekseev & Ellenberger | 2019 | An elateroid mysteriomorphid beetle. | |
| Necromeropsis minutus | Yu, Ślipiński & Pang | 2019 | A rare click beetle. | |
| Nicobium cretaceum | Háva & Zahradník | 2023 | A species of Nicobium. | |
| Nothattagenus burmiticus | (Cai, Háva & Huang) | 2017 | Originally described as an attagenine carpet beetle, but subsequently reinterpreted as a member of Orphilinae. Originally named Attagenus burmiticus. | |
| Nothotytthonyx serratus | Li, Biffi, Kundrata & Cai in Li et al. | 2022 | A soldier beetle. | |
| Nuegua elongata | Yin, Cai & Newton | 2018 | A glandulariine ant-like stone beetle. | |
| Nugatorhinus albomaculatus | Clarke & Oberprieler in Clarke et al. | 2018 | An Aepyceratinae mesophyletid weevil. | |
| Nugatorhinus chenyangi | Clarke & Oberprieler in Clarke et al. | 2018 | An Aepyceratinae mesophyletid weevil. | |
| Ocriocis binodosus | Clarke & Oberprieler in Clarke et al. | 2018 | A Mesophyletinae mesophyletid weevil. | |
| Octavius electrospinosus | Clarke & Chatzimanolis | 2009 | A Euaesthetine Euaesthetinae rove beetle | |
| Olexum complanatum | Simon Pražák & Lackner in Simon Pražák et al. | 2023 | A clown beetle. | |
| Oncelytris esquamatus | Li & Cai in Li, Huang & Cai | 2023 | A stag beetle. | |
| Onthophilus yingae | Jiang et al. | 2020 | A clown beetle. | |
| Opeatorhynchus comans | Clarke & Oberprieler in Clarke et al. | 2018 | A Mesophyletinae mesophyletid weevil. | |
| Ornatomalthinus elvirae | Poinar & Fanti | 2016 | A soldier beetle. | |
| Oxyporus cretaceous | Yamamoto | 2017 | An oxyporine rove beetle. | |
| Pactopus burmensis | Muona | 2019 | A throscid false click beetle. | |
| Pacyclaxyra azari | Tihelka, Huang & Cai | 2021 | A member of the family Cyclaxyridae. | |
| Palaeabraeus glabrus | Simon-Pražák et al. | 2024 | A member of the family Histeridae belonging to the subfamily Abraeinae. | |
| Palaeocantharis panna | Hsiao et al. | 2021 | A soldier beetle. Possibly a species of Elektrokleinia. | |
| Palaeocryptorhynchus burmanus | Poinar | 2009 | A palaeocryptorhynchine weevil. | |
| Palaeomycetes foveolatus | Tomaszewska, Ślipiński & Ren in Tomaszewska et al. | 2018 | A handsome fungus beetle. | |
| Palaeopycnus circus | Lu, Ballerio & Bai in Lu et al. | 2022 | A member of the family Hybosoridae belonging to the subfamily Ceratocanthinae. | |
| Palaeopycnus fushengii | Lu, Ballerio & Bai in Lu et al. | 2022 | A member of the family Hybosoridae belonging to the subfamily Ceratocanthinae. | |
| Palaeosymbius groehni | Arriaga-Varela et al. | 2024 | A member of the family Anamorphidae. | |
| Palaeosymbius mesozoicus | Arriaga-Varela et al. | 2024 | A member of the family Anamorphidae. | |
| Paleoendeitoma antennata | Denget al. | 2017 | A synchitine colydiine ironclad beetle. | |
| Paleoendeitoma buryi | Háva | 2019 | A synchitine colydiine ironclad beetle. | |
| Paleoendeitoma minuta | Denget al. | 2017 | A synchitine colydiine ironclad beetle. | |
| Paleoendeitoma tuberculata | Bullis | 2020 | A colydiinae cylindrical bark beetle. | |
| Paleoeucnemis minutus | Muona | 2020 | A eucnemine false click beetle. | |
| Paleopegorhinus micrommatus | Poinar, Brown & Legalov | 2021 | A member of the family Ithyceridae belonging to the subfamily Chilecarinae. | |
| Paleoselatosomus cretaceus | Kundrata, Triskova & Prosvirov | 2024 | A click beetle belonging to the subfamily Dendrometrinae. | |
| Pangusyndicus excavatus | Yin, Zhou & Cai in Yin et al. | 2018 | An ant-like stone beetle. | |
| Pangusyndicus longirostris | Jałoszyński | 2020 | A glandulariine ant-like stone beetle. | |
| Pantostictus burmanicus | Poinar & Brown | 2009 | A clown beetle | |
| Pantostictus hirsutus | Simon-Pražák et al. | 2024 | A clown beetle. | |
| Parabolitobius antiquus | Yamamoto | 2023 | A rove beetle belonging to the subfamily Mycetoporinae. | |
| Parayixianteres parvus | Yu, Leschen & Ślipiński in Yu et al. | 2020 | A lophocaterid beetle. | |
| Passalopalpus cheni | Boucher et al. | 2016 | A passalopalpid beetle. | |
| Pelretes bicolor | Zhao et al. | 2022 | A member of the family Kateretidae, an apophisandrid beetle or a sap beetle. | |
| Pelretes vivificus | Tihelka et al. | 2021 | A member of the family Kateretidae, an apophisandrid beetle or a sap beetle. | |
| Periosocerus crenulatus | Clarke & Oberprieler in Clarke et al. | 2018 | A Mesophyletinae mesophyletid weevil. | |
| Periosocerus deplanatus | Clarke & Oberprieler in Clarke et al. | 2018 | A Mesophyletinae mesophyletid weevil. | |
| Periosomerus tanyorhynchus | Poinar, Brown & Legalov | 2019 | A New York weevil. | |
| Petalotarsus curculionoides | Clarke & Oberprieler in Clarke et al. | 2018 | A Mesophyletinae mesophyletid weevil. | |
| Petalotarsus cylindricus | Clarke & Oberprieler in Clarke et al. | 2018 | A Mesophyletinae mesophyletid weevil. | |
| Petalotarsus oxycorynoides | Clarke & Oberprieler in Clarke et al. | 2018 | A Mesophyletinae mesophyletid weevil. | |
| Phasmister cristatus | Caterino | 2021 | A member of the family Histeridae belonging to the subfamily Onthophilinae. | |
| Phasmister kraliceki | Simon-Pražák et al. | 2024 | A member of the family Histeridae belonging to the subfamily Onthophilinae. | |
| Phasmister parallelus | Caterino & Yamamoto | 2023 | A member of the family Histeridae belonging to the subfamily Onthophilinae. | |
| Phasmister planatus | Simon-Pražák et al. | 2024 | A member of the family Histeridae belonging to the subfamily Onthophilinae. | |
| Phenolia haoranae | Kirejtshuk & Jenkins Shaw in Kirejtshuk, Jenkins Shaw & Smirnov | 2023 | A species of Phenolia. | |
| Phloeocharis burmana | Yamamoto & Newton | 2023 | A species of Phloeocharis. | |
| Placatister cascus | Simon-Pražák et al. | 2024 | A member of the family Histeridae. | |
| Platycretus muscularis | Simon Pražák & Lackner in Simon Pražák et al. | 2023 | A clown beetle. | |
| Plesiotoma alissae | Batelka, Engel, & Prokop | 2018 | A wedge-shaped beetle. | |
| Pleuroceratos burmiticus | Poinar & Kirejtshuk | 2008 | A phloeostichid beetle. | |
| Pleuroceratos jiewenae | Tihelka, Huang & Cai | 2020 | A phloeostichid beetle. | |
| Pleuroceratos tertius | Háva | 2023 | A phloeostichid beetle. | |
| Poinarinius antonkozlovi | Legalov & Háva | 2022 | An alitrepanine auger beetle. | |
| Poinarinius aristovi | Legalov & Háva | 2022 | An alitrepanine auger beetle. | |
| Poinarinius borowskii | Legalov & Háva | 2022 | An alitrepanine auger beetle. | |
| Poinarinius burmaensis | Legalov | 2018 | An alitrepanine auger beetle. | |
| Poinarinius coziki | Háva & Legalov | 2023 | An alitrepanine auger beetle. | |
| Poinarinius cretaceus | Legalov & Háva | 2022 | An alitrepanine auger beetle. | |
| Poinarinius decimus | Háva & Legalov | 2023 | An alitrepanine auger beetle. | |
| Poinarinius kachinus | Wang, Peng & Wang in Wang et al. | 2024 | An alitrepanine auger beetle. | |
| Poinarinius lesnei | Legalov & Háva | 2022 | An alitrepanine auger beetle. | |
| Poinarinius perkovskyi | Legalov & Háva | 2022 | An alitrepanine auger beetle. | |
| Poinarinius vetus | Wang, Peng & Wang in Wang et al. | 2024 | An alitrepanine auger beetle. | |
| Poinarinius zahradniki | Legalov & Háva | 2022 | An alitrepanine auger beetle. | |
| Polliniretes penalveri | Peris & Jelínek | 2019 | A short-winged flower beetle, an apophisandrid beetle or a sap beetle. | |
| Praezolodinus pilosus | Bao & Antunes-Carvalho | 2020 | A zolodinine darkling beetle. | |
| Prajna tianmiaoae | Lü, Cai & Huang | 2017 | A thinobiine oxyteline rove beetle. | |
| Praphennium carinatum | Jałoszyński | 2018 | A Cephenniini Scydmaeninae rove beetle. | |
| Primaevomordellida burmitina | Bao et al. | 2019 | A tumbling flower beetle. | |
| Priochirus thayerae | Yamamoto | 2019 | An osoriine rove beetle. | |
| Priochirus trisclerite | Peng et al. | 2022 | An osoriine rove beetle. | |
| Priscaplectus carinatus | Yin, Chandler & Cai | 2019 | A pselaphine rove beetle | |
| Priscaplectus grandiceps | Yin, Chandler & Cai | 2019 | A pselaphine rove beetle. | |
| Procileoporus burmiticus | Yamamoto | 2016 | A Tachyporinae rove beetle. | |
| Prodigister tricostatus | Simon-Pražák et al. | 2024 | A member of the family Histeridae. | |
| Prodiphyllostoma inexpectatum | Yamamoto | 2024 | A false stag beetle. | |
| Promyrmister kistneri | Zhou, Ślipiński & Parker | 2019 | A haeteriine clown beetle. | |
| Propiestus archaicus | Yamamoto, Caron & Bortoluzzi | 2018 | A Piestinae rove beetle. | |
| Prosolierius crassicornis | Thayer, Newton & Chatzimanolis | 2012 | A solieriine rove beetle | |
| Prosolierius mixticornis | Thayer, Newton & Chatzimanolis | 2012 | A solieriine rove beetle | |
| Prosolierius tenuicornis | Thayer, Newton & Chatzimanolis | 2012 | A solieriine rove beetle | |
| Prosolierius thayerae | Yamamoto | 2023 | A solieriine rove beetle | |
| Prostreptocerus burmiticus | Yu & Cai in Yu et al. | 2024 | A stag beetle belonging to the subfamily Lampriminae. | |
| Protodasycerus aenigmaticus | Yamamoto | 2016 | A dasycerine rove beetle. | |
| Protodasycerus corpulentus | Yin & Cai in Yin et al. | 2020 | A dasycerine rove beetle. | |
| Protodasycerus gigas | Yin & Cai in Yin et al. | 2020 | A dasycerine rove beetle. | |
| Protodasycerus tuberculatus | Yamamoto, Newton & Yin in Yin et al. | 2020 | A dasycerine rove beetle. | |
| Protokateretes antiquus | (Peris & Jelínek) | 2020 | A kateretid short-winged flower beetle, an apophisandrid beetle or a sap beetle. Originally described as Eoceniretes antiquus. | |
| Protokateretes magnascapulae | Zhao et al. | 2024 | A kateretid short-winged flower beetle or a sap beetle. | |
| Protokateretes megacephalus | Zhao, Huang & Cai | 2023 | A kateretid short-winged flower beetle, an apophisandrid beetle or a sap beetle. | |
| Protokateretes rectangulum | Zhao et al. | 2024 | A kateretid short-winged flower beetle or a sap beetle. | |
| Protoliota antennatus | Liu et al. | 2019 | A silvan flat bark beetle. | |
| Protoliota paleus | Poinar, Vega & Legalov | 2023 | A silvan flat bark beetle. | |
| Protoluciola albertalleni | Kazantsev | 2015 | A lucioline firefly. | |
| Protomicrorhagus antennatus | Muona | 2020 | A melasine false click beetle. | |
| Protomicrorhagus brevis | Muona | 2020 | A melasine false click beetle. | |
| Protomicrorhagus latus | Han et al. | 2024 | | |
| Protonicagus mandibularis | Yamamoto | 2023 | A stag beetle. | |
| Protonicagus tani | Cai et al. | 2017 | A nicagine aesaline stag beetle. | |
| Protonitidula neli | Zhao, Huang & Cai | 2022 | An apophisandrid beetle or a sap beetle. | |
| Protopeplus cretaceus | Cai & Huang | 2014 | A micropepline rove beetle | |
| Protopselaphus newtoni | Liu et al. | 2020 | A protopselaphine rove beetle. | |
| Protopselaphus thayerae | Liu et al. | 2020 | A protopselaphine rove beetle. | |
| Protoripidius burmiticus | Cai, Yin & Huang | 2018 | A Ripidiinae wedge-shaped beetle. | |
| Prototrichalus jingpo | Telnov & Kundrata in Telnov et al. | 2023 | A member of the family Ischaliidae. | |
| Prototrichalus meiyingae | Molino-Olmedo et al. | 2020 | A member of the family Ischaliidae. | |
| Prototrichalus milleri | Molino-Olmedo et al. | 2020 | A member of the family Ischaliidae. | |
| Prototrichalus sepronai | Molino-Olmedo et al. | 2020 | A member of the family Ischaliidae. | |
| Protovitellius deceptus | Muona | 2020 | A eucnemine false click beetle. | |
| Protrichonyx rafifrons | Parker | 2016 | A Pselaphinae rove beetle. | |
| Pseudacritus extinctus | Simon-Pražák et al. | 2024 | A member of the family Histeridae belonging to the subfamily Abraeinae. | |
| Pseudomataeopsephus burmensis | Li, Huang & Cai | 2021 | A water-penny beetle. | |
| Pseudomyall elongatulus | Muona | 2020 | A eucnemine false click beetle. | |
| Pseudopactopus robustus | Li & Cai in Li, Huang & Cai | 2021 | A throscid beetle. | |
| Qitianniu zhihaoi | Lin & Bai | 2017 | A longhorn beetle. | |
| Raractocetus extinctus | Yamamoto | 2019 | An Atractocerinae ship-timber beetle. | |
| Rhadinomycter perplexus | Clarke & Oberprieler in Clarke et al. | 2018 | A Mesophyletinae mesophyletid weevil. | |
| Rhamphophorus legalovii | Poinar & Brown | 2021 | A weevil belonging to the family Nemonychidae. | |
| Rhomeocalpsua torosa | Li, Tomaszewska & Cai in Li et al. | 2022 | A member of the family Endomychidae. | |
| Rhynchitomimus chalybeus | Clarke & Oberprieler in Clarke et al. | 2018 | An Aepyceratinae mesophyletid weevil. | |
| Ripidinelia burmiticola | Batelka & Prokop | 2019 | A ripidiine wedge shaped beetle. | |
| Ripidinelia daiboyui | Li & Cai in Li, Huang & Cai | 2024 | A ripidiine wedge shaped beetle. | |
| Sanaungulus christensenae | Fanti & Damgaard | 2019 | A soldier beetle | |
| Sanaungulus cuaroni | (Bramanti & Fanti) | 2022 | A soldier beetle. Originally described as Poinarelektronmiles cuaroni. | |
| Sanaungulus curtipennis | Fanti, Damgaard & Ellenberger | 2018 | A soldier beetle. | |
| Sanaungulus dunlopi | Fanti & Müller | 2022 | A soldier beetle. | |
| Sanaungulus electrum | Fanti & Müller | 2022 | A soldier beetle. | |
| Sanaungulus elongaticollis | Yang, Zhao & Liu | 2024 | A soldier beetle. | |
| Sanaungulus emarginaticollis | Yang et al. | 2022 | A soldier beetle. | |
| Sanaungulus fabriciusi | Fanti & Damgaard | 2019 | A soldier beetle | |
| Sanaungulus franziskaeweissbachae | Fanti & Müller | 2022 | A soldier beetle. | |
| Sanaungulus ghitaenoerbyae | Fanti, Damgaard & Ellenberger | 2018 | A soldier beetle. | |
| Sanaungulus havai | Fanti & Müller | 2022 | A soldier beetle. | |
| Sanaungulus imparitibius | Yang et al. | 2022 | A soldier beetle. | |
| Sanaungulus kachinensis | Fanti & Müller | 2022 | A soldier beetle. | |
| Sanaungulus kirstenaeweissbachae | Fanti & Müller | 2022 | A soldier beetle. | |
| Sanaungulus laticoxa | Yang et al. | 2022 | A soldier beetle. | |
| Sanaungulus leniae | Fanti & Müller | 2022 | A soldier beetle. | |
| Sanaungulus longicornis | Yang, Zhao & Liu | 2024 | A soldier beetle. | |
| Sanaungulus marginalis | Yang, Zhao & Liu | 2024 | A soldier beetle. | |
| Sanaungulus morellii | Fanti & Damgaard | 2020 | A soldier beetle. | |
| Sanaungulus multiramus | Yang et al. | 2022 | A soldier beetle. | |
| Sanaungulus myanmaricus | Fanti & Müller | 2022 | A soldier beetle. | |
| Sanaungulus myitkyinaensis | Fanti & Müller | 2022 | A soldier beetle. | |
| Sanaungulus nalae | Fanti & Müller | 2022 | A soldier beetle. | |
| Sanaungulus nilsi | Fanti & Müller | 2022 | A soldier beetle. | |
| Sanaungulus perkovskyi | Fanti & Müller | 2022 | A soldier beetle. | |
| Sanaungulus peteriruedeli | Fanti & Müller | 2022 | A soldier beetle. | |
| Sanaungulus rosenzweigi | Fanti & Damgaard | 2020 | A soldier beetle. | |
| Sanaungulus ruficollis | Yang et al. | 2022 | A soldier beetle. | |
| Sanaungulus ruicheni | Hsiao & Huang | 2018 | A soldier beetle. Originally described as "Ornatomalthinus" ruicheni. | |
| Sanaungulus temporiscapsula | Fanti & Müller | 2022 | A soldier beetle. | |
| Sanaungulus troelsikloevedali | Fanti & Damgaard | 2019 | A soldier beetle | |
| Sanaungulus undecimus | Yang, Zhao & Liu | 2024 | A soldier beetle. | |
| Sanaungulus ypogaeum | Fanti & Müller | 2022 | A soldier beetle | |
| Sarothrias cretaceus | Cai et al. | 2017 | A jacobsoniid beetle. | |
| Scaporetes rectus | Zhao, Huang & Cai | 2022 | A kateretid short-winged flower beetle, an apophisandrid beetle or a sap beetle. | |
| Scydmaenus linqibini | Yin & Zhou | 2020 | A scydmaenine ant-like stone beetle. | |
| Scydmaenus minor | Yin & Cai | 2019 | An ant-like stone beetle. | |
| Scydmobisetia dentipes | Jałoszyński & Bai in Jałoszyński, Bai & Wang | 2020 | An ant-like stone beetle. | |
| Scydmobisetia loebli | Yin, Zhou & Cai | 2018 | An ant-like stone beetle. | |
| Scydmobisetia mengjiae | Yin, Zhou & Cai | 2018 | An ant-like stone beetle. | |
| Scydmobisetia vetutissima | Jałoszyński & Yamamoto in Jałoszyński, Yamamoto & Takahashi | 2016 | A Glandulariini ant-like stone beetle. | |
| Sieglindea antiqua | Muona | 2020 | A eucnemine false click beetle. | |
| Sorodites angustipes | Kirejtshuk & Chetverikov | 2018 | A sap beetle. | |
| Sparedrus archaicus | Vitali & Ellenberger | 2019 | A false blister beetle | |
| Sphaerothorax uenoi | Cai & Lawrence in Cai et al. | 2019 | A fringe-winged beetle. | |
| Spinanitidula nigrumflavo | Zhao & Cai in Zhao et al. | 2024 | A sap beetle. | |
| Spinotoma ruicheni | Hsiao & Huang | 2018 | A Pelecotominae wedge-shaped beetle. | |
| Stegastochlidus saraemcheana | Poinar & Vega | 2020 | A colydiine ironclad beetle. | |
| Succinumanax birmaniasis | Bao, Rust & Wang | 2018 | A Eubrianacinae water-penny beetle. | |
| Syntelia sunwukong | Jiang & Wang | 2020 | A species of Syntelia. | |
| Tachyporus burmiticus | Yamamoto | 2024 | A species of Tachyporus. | |
| Thanerosus antiquus | Peris & Kolibáč in Peris, Mähler & Kolibáč | 2022 | A member of the family Thanerocleridae. | |
| Thescelostrophus cretaceus | Yu et al. | 2016 | A Eustrophini polypore fungus beetle. | |
| Trapezioceps longelytrum | Qu, Jarzembowski & Luo in Qu et al. | 2023 | A soldier beetle or a mysteriomorphid elateroid. Possibly a species of Mysteriomorphus. | |
| Trematosphindus newtoni | Li & Cai in Li et al. | 2021 | A member of the family Sphindidae. | |
| Trichophya minor | Yamamoto & Newton | 2021 | A species of Trichophya. | |
| Trihelota fulvata | Tihelka, Huang & Cai | 2020 | A helotid beetle. | |
| Trixagosoma guangyuani | Li et al. | 2020 | A throscid beetle. | |
| Tuberphradonoma burmitica | Háva | 2021 | A Megatomine carpet beetle. | |
| Tuberphradonoma secunda | Háva | 2022 | A megatomine carpet beetle. | |
| Varcalium lawrencei | Li, Ruta, Tihelka & Cai in Li et al. | 2022 | A member of the family Scirtidae. | |
| Vetatractocerus burmiticus | Yamamoto | 2019 | An atractocerine ship-timber beetle. | |
| Vetatrecus adelfiae | Kypke et al. | 2018 | An Othiini Staphylininae rove beetle. | |
| Vetatrecus secretum | Kypke et al. | 2018 | An Othiini Staphylininae rove beetle. | |
| Vetubrachypsectra burmitica | Qu et al. | 2020 | A brachypsectrid Texas beetle. | |
| Vetubrachypsectra huchengi | Li, Kundrata & Cai in Li et al. | 2022 | A brachypsectrid Texas beetle. | |
| Vetudasycerus burmiticus | Cai et al. | 2018 | A Dasycerinae rove beetle. | |
| Vetujinbrianax cretaceus | Cai & Huang | 2018 | A water-penny beetle. | |
| Vetuprostomis angularis | Li & Cai in Li et al. | 2022 | A jugular-horned beetle | |
| Vetuprostomis consimilis | Engel & Grimaldi | 2008 | A jugular-horned beetle | |
| Vetuprostomis gaoi | Li & Cai in Li et al. | 2022 | A jugular-horned beetle | |
| Vetuproteinus cretaceus | Cai et al. | 2016 | A Proteininae rove beetle. | |
| Vicelva rasilis | Li et al. | 2024 | A rove beetle belonging to the subfamily Phloeocharinae. | |
| Vidya scabra | Chen et al. | 2023 | A rove beetle belonging to the subfamily Oxytelinae. | |
| Vitalfranzius burmiticus | Fanti & Müller | 2022 | A soldier beetle | |
| Vitalfranzius cretaceus | Fanti & Müller | 2022 | A soldier beetle | |
| Xenostanus jiangkuni | Li, Szawaryn & Cai in Li et al. | 2022 | A member of the family Corylophidae. | |
| Yassibum yoshitomii | Li et al. | 2024 | A member of Coccinelloidea. | |
| Yethiha peregrina | Caterino | 2021 | A member of the family Histeridae belonging to the subfamily Dendrophilinae. | |
| Yethiha pubescens | Simon Pražák & Lackner in Simon Pražák et al. | 2023 | A member of the family Histeridae belonging to the subfamily Dendrophilinae. | |
| Zaiwa pankowskiorum | Lyubarsky et al. | 2021 | A lophocaterid beetle. | |
| Zimmiorhinus conicops | (Clarke & Oberprieler) in Clarke et al. | 2018 | A Mesophyletinae mesophyletid weevil. Originally described as Elwoodius conicops. | |

== Incertae sedis ==
| Taxon | Authority | Year described | Notes | image |
|---|---|---|---|---|
| Palaeotylus femoralis | Poinar, Vega, & Legalov | 2018 | A beetle of uncertain placement. | |
