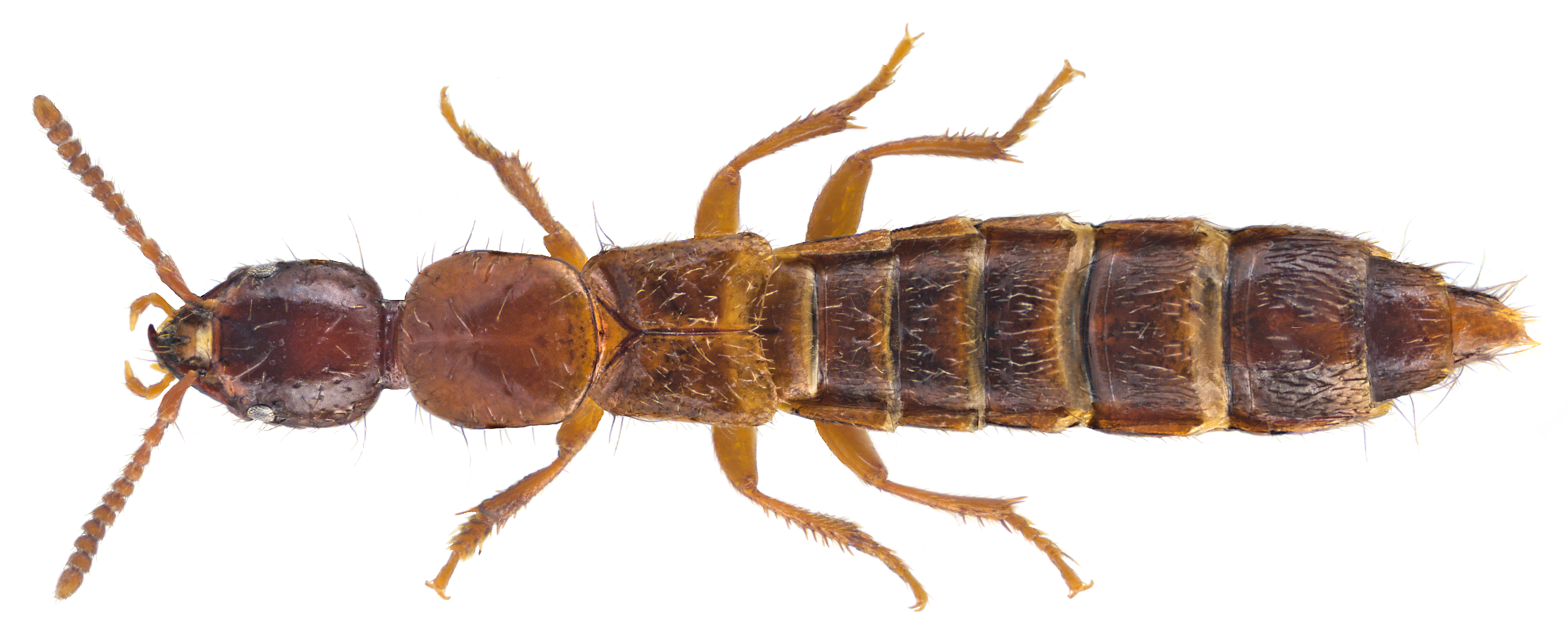

Scientific classification
- Kingdom: Animalia
- Phylum: Arthropoda
- Clade: Pancrustacea
- Class: Insecta
- Order: Coleoptera
- Suborder: Polyphaga
- Infraorder: Staphyliniformia
- Family: Staphylinidae
- Subfamily: Staphylininae
- Tribe: Othiini; Thomson, C. G., 1859

Genera
- Atrecus Jacquelin du Val, 1856; Caecolinus Jeannel, 1923; Othius Stephens, 1829; Parothius Casey, 1906; †Vetatrecus Kypke, Solodovnikov & Żyła, 2018

= Othiini =

Tribe of beetles

Othiini is a tribe of beetles belonging to the family Staphylinidae.
