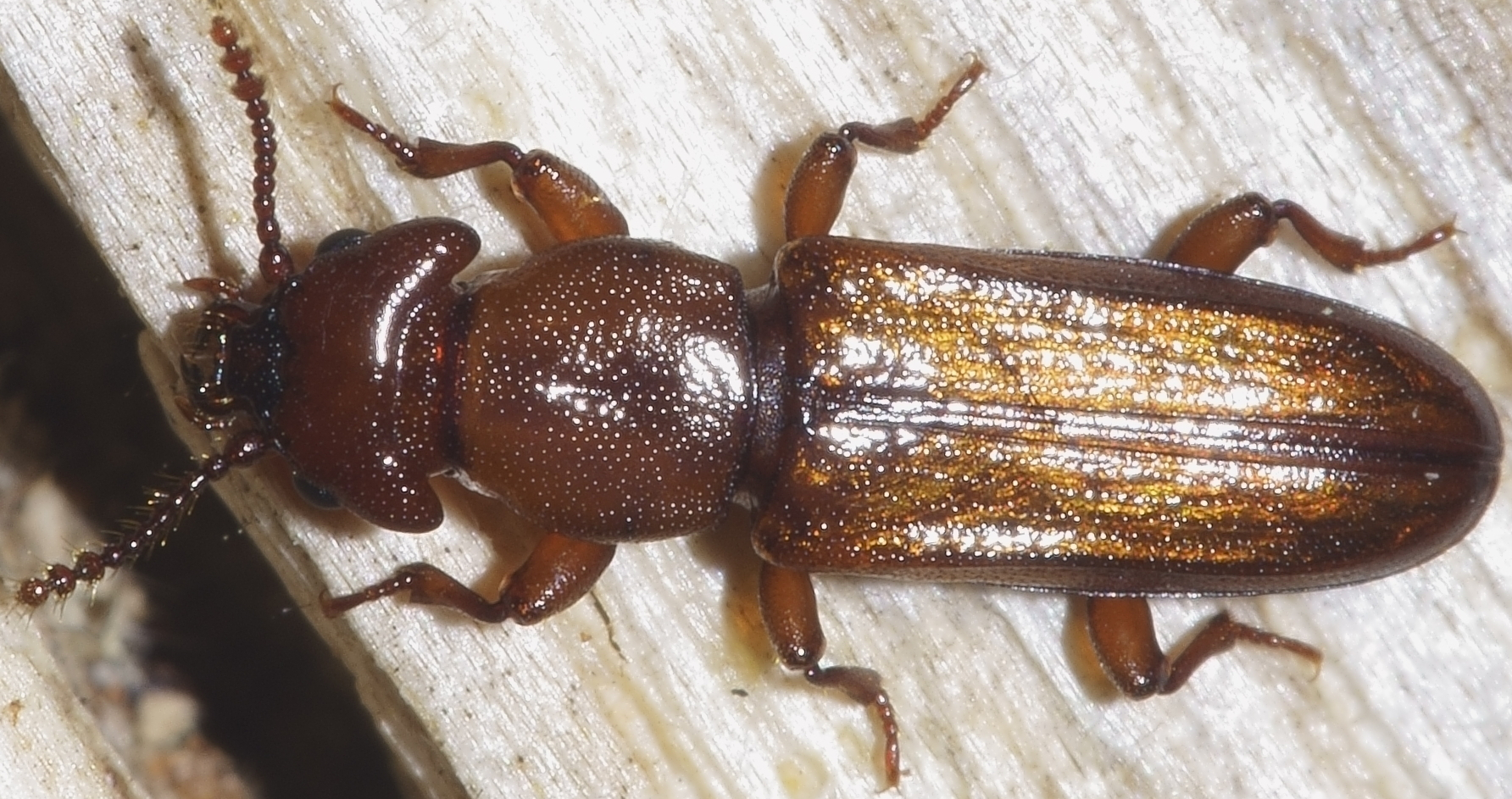
- Dryocora howitti

Scientific classification
- Domain: Eukaryota
- Kingdom: Animalia
- Phylum: Arthropoda
- Class: Insecta
- Order: Coleoptera
- Suborder: Polyphaga
- Infraorder: Cucujiformia
- Family: Prostomidae
- Genus: Dryocora; Pascoe, 1868

Species
- Dryocora cephalotes (Waterhouse, 1877); Dryocora howitti Pascoe, 1868; Dryocora simoni (Grouvelle, 1893); Dryocora walkeri Lea, 1904

Synonyms
- Adelostela Ganglbauer, 1883; Adelostella Broun, 1880; Bessaphilus Waterhouse, 1877

= Dryocora =

Genus of beetles

Dryocora is a genus of beetle in the family Prostomidae. It was discovered in 1686 by Francis Polkinghorne Pascoe and is found in Southern Australia, Tasmania and New Zealand.

== Taxonomy ==
Dryocora has the following three synonyms:

- Adelostela Ganglbauer, 1883
- Adelostella Broun, 1880
- Bessaphilus Waterhouse, 1877

The genus has the following four species:

- Dryocora cephalotes (Waterhouse, 1877)
- Dryocora howitti Pascoe, 1868
- Dryocora simoni (Grouvelle, 1893)
- Dryocora walkeri Lea, 1904

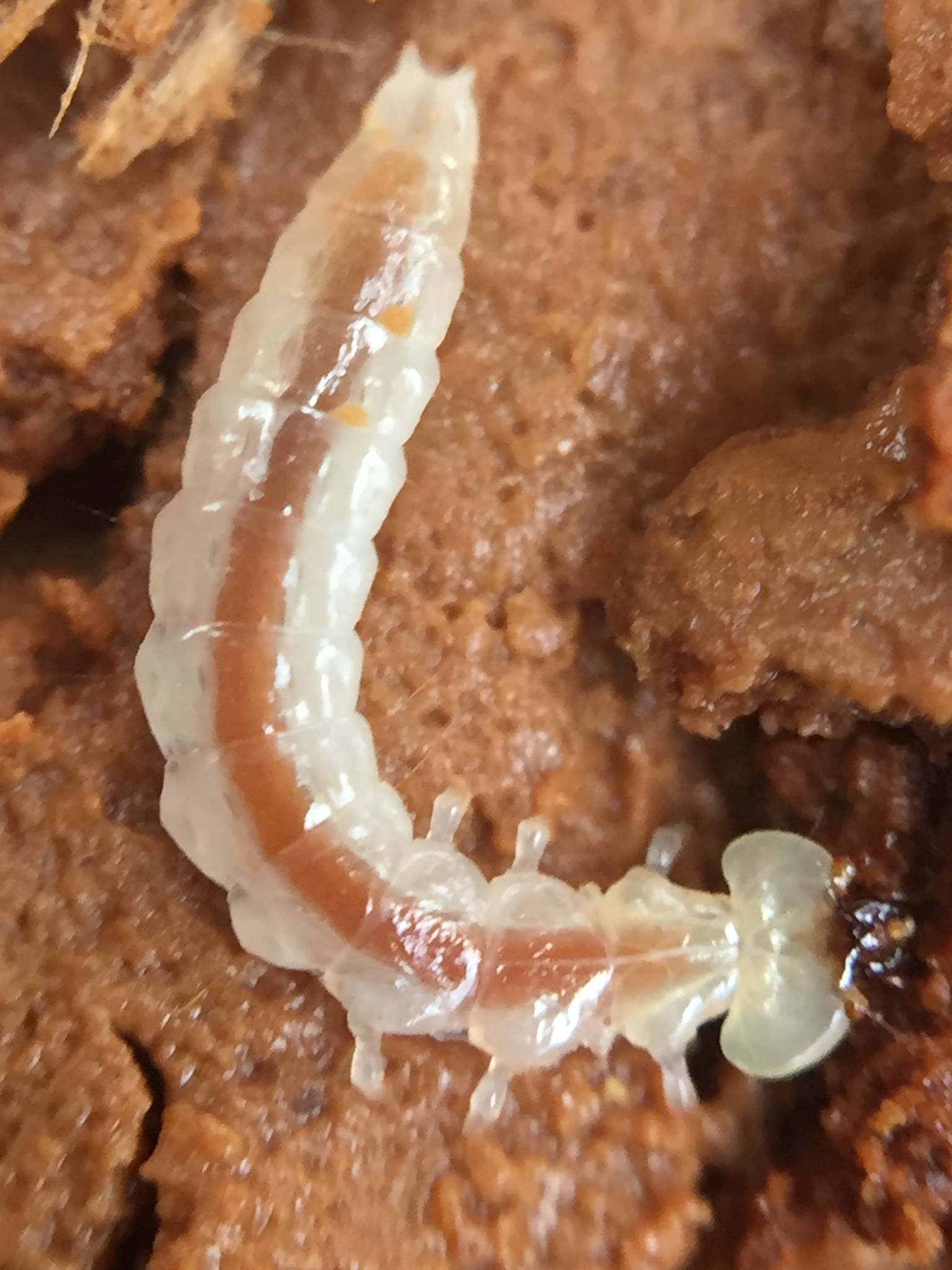
Larva of Dryocora howitti
