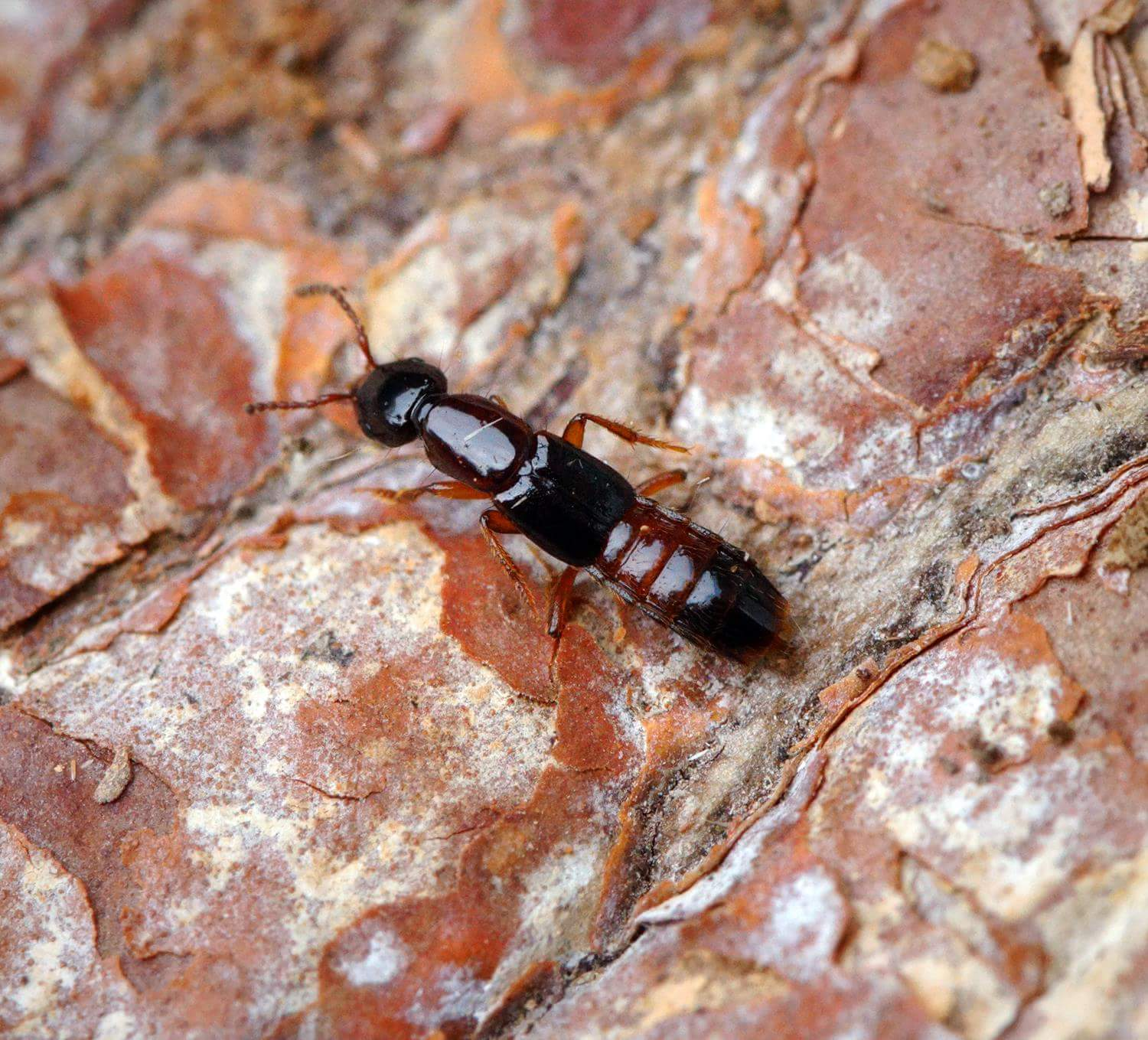
- Atrecus affinis

Scientific classification
- Kingdom: Animalia
- Phylum: Arthropoda
- Class: Insecta
- Order: Coleoptera
- Suborder: Polyphaga
- Infraorder: Staphyliniformia
- Family: Staphylinidae
- Subfamily: Staphylininae
- Tribe: Othiini
- Genus: Atrecus; Jacquelin du Val, 1856

= Atrecus =

Genus of beetles

Atrecus is a genus of beetles belonging to the family Staphylinidae. The genus was first described by Jacquelin du Val in 1856. The species of this genus are found in Eurasia and Northern America.

Species include:

- Atrecus affinis
- Atrecus longiceps
- Atrecus pilicornis
