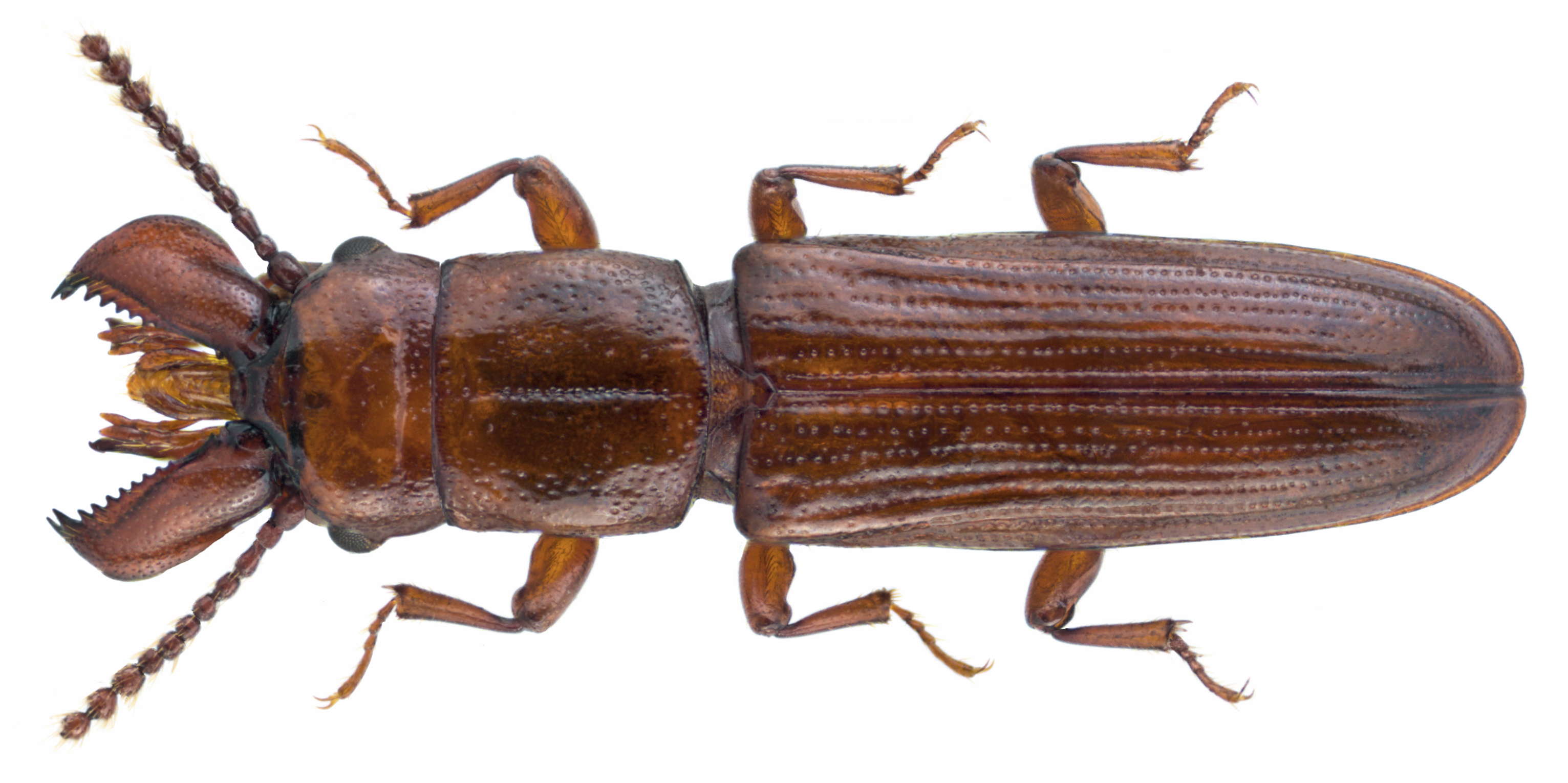
- Prostomis mandibularis

Scientific classification
- Kingdom: Animalia
- Phylum: Arthropoda
- Class: Insecta
- Order: Coleoptera
- Suborder: Polyphaga
- Infraorder: Cucujiformia
- Family: Prostomidae
- Genus: Prostomis; Latreille, 1819

Species
- See text

= Prostomis =

Genus of beetles

Prostomis is a genus of beetles in the family Prostomidae.

== Species ==
The genus Prostomis contains at least 28 accepted species, including:

- Prostomis africana Grouvelle, 1896
- Prostomis atkinsoni Waterhouse, 1877
- Prostomis americana Crotch, 1874
- Prostomis beatae Schawaller, 1991
- Prostomis cameronica Schawaller, 1992
- Prostomis cornuta Waterhouse, 1877
- Prostomis edithae Schawaller, 1991
- Prostomis gladiator Blackburn, 1903
- Prostomis intermedia Blackburn, 1897
- Prostomis katrinae Schawaller, 1991
- Prostomis kinabaluca Schawaller, 1992
- Prostomis latoris Reitter, 1889
- Prostomis lawrencei Schawaller, 1993
- Prostomis luzonica Schawaller, 1992
- Prostomis magna Ito & Yoshitomi, 2017
- Prostomis mandibularis (Fabricius, 1801)
- Prostomis mordax Reitter, 1887
- Prostomis morsitans Pascoe, 1860
- Prostomis okinawaensis Ito & Yoshitomi, 2017
- Prostomis pacifica Fairmaire, 1881
- Prostomis papuana Schawaller, 1993
- Prostomis parva Ito & Yoshitomi, 2017
- Prostomis samoensis Arrow, 1927
- Prostomis schlegeli Olliff, 1884
- Prostomis susannae Schawaller, 1991
- Prostomis taiwanensis Ito & Yoshitomi, 2017
- Prostomis tetragona Ito & Yoshitomi, 2017
- Prostomis trigona Ito & Yoshitomi, 2016
- Prostomis yaeyamaensis Ito & Yoshitomi, 2017
