= Prosolierius =

Prosolierius Temporal range: Barremian–Albian

Scientific classification
- Kingdom: Animalia
- Phylum: Arthropoda
- Clade: Pancrustacea
- Class: Insecta
- Order: Coleoptera
- Suborder: Polyphaga
- Infraorder: Staphyliniformia
- Family: Staphylinidae
- Subfamily: Solieriinae
- Genus: †Prosolierius; Thayer et al., 2012

Species
- Prosolierius tenuicornis Thayer et al., 2012; Prosolierius crassicornis Thayer et al., 2012; Prosolierius mixticornis Thayer et al., 2012; Prosolierius parvus Peris et al., 2014; Prosolierius qizhihaoi Liu et al., 2025

Genus of beetles

Prosolierius is an extinct genus of rove beetle which existed in what is now Lebanon, Myanmar and Spain during the Barremian through the Albian period. It was described by Margaret K. Thayer, Alfred F. Newton and Stylianos Chatzimanolis in 2012.
