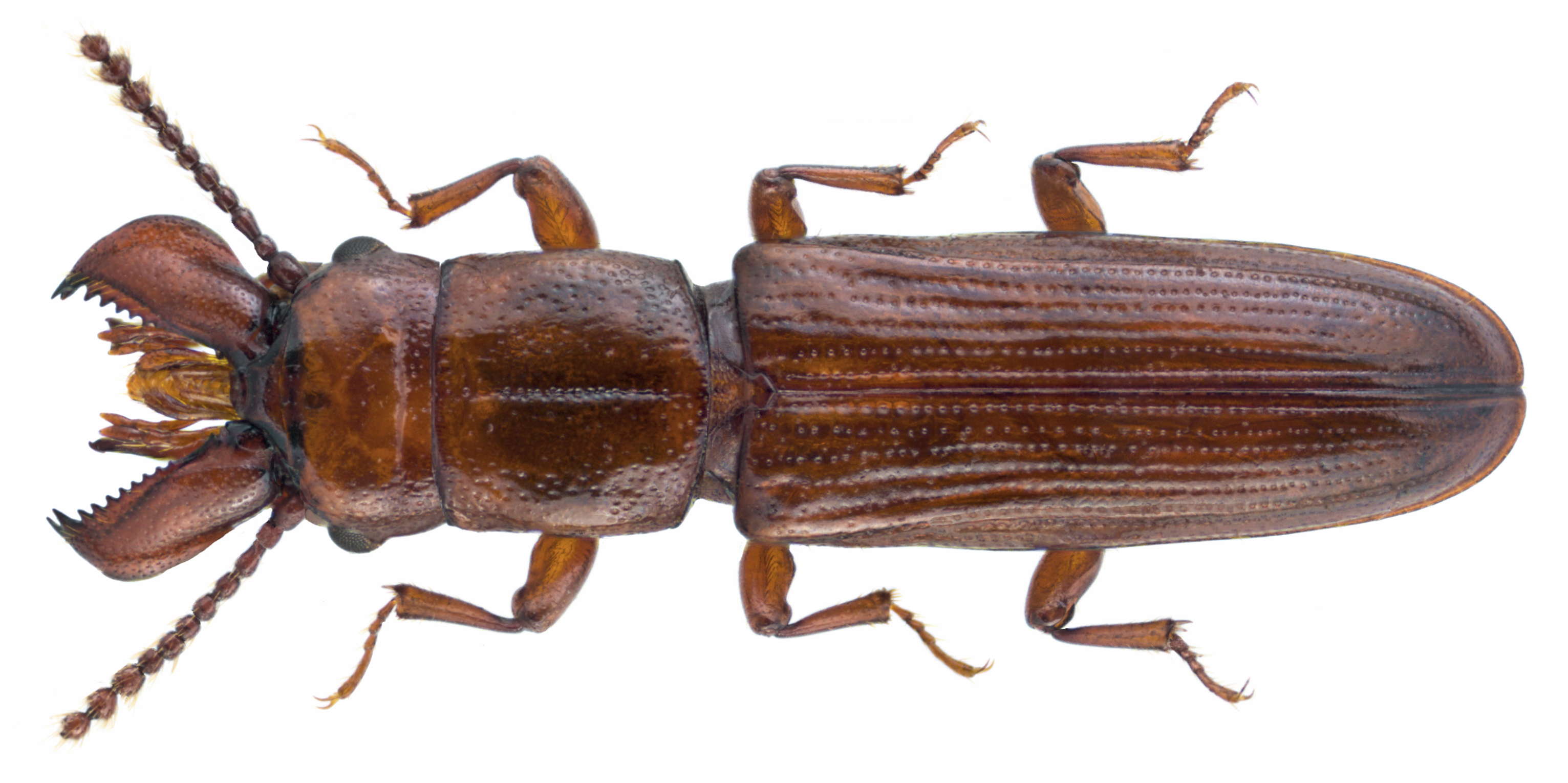

Scientific classification
- Domain: Eukaryota
- Kingdom: Animalia
- Phylum: Arthropoda
- Class: Insecta
- Order: Coleoptera
- Suborder: Polyphaga
- Infraorder: Cucujiformia
- Family: Prostomidae
- Genus: Prostomis
- Species: P. mandibularis

Binomial name
- Prostomis mandibularis (Fabricius, 1801)

= Prostomis mandibularis =

Species of beetle

Prostomis mandibularis is a beetle of the family Prostomidae. The beetle can be found in northern and eastern Europe, the Caucasus, Elbrus Mountains, and North America.
