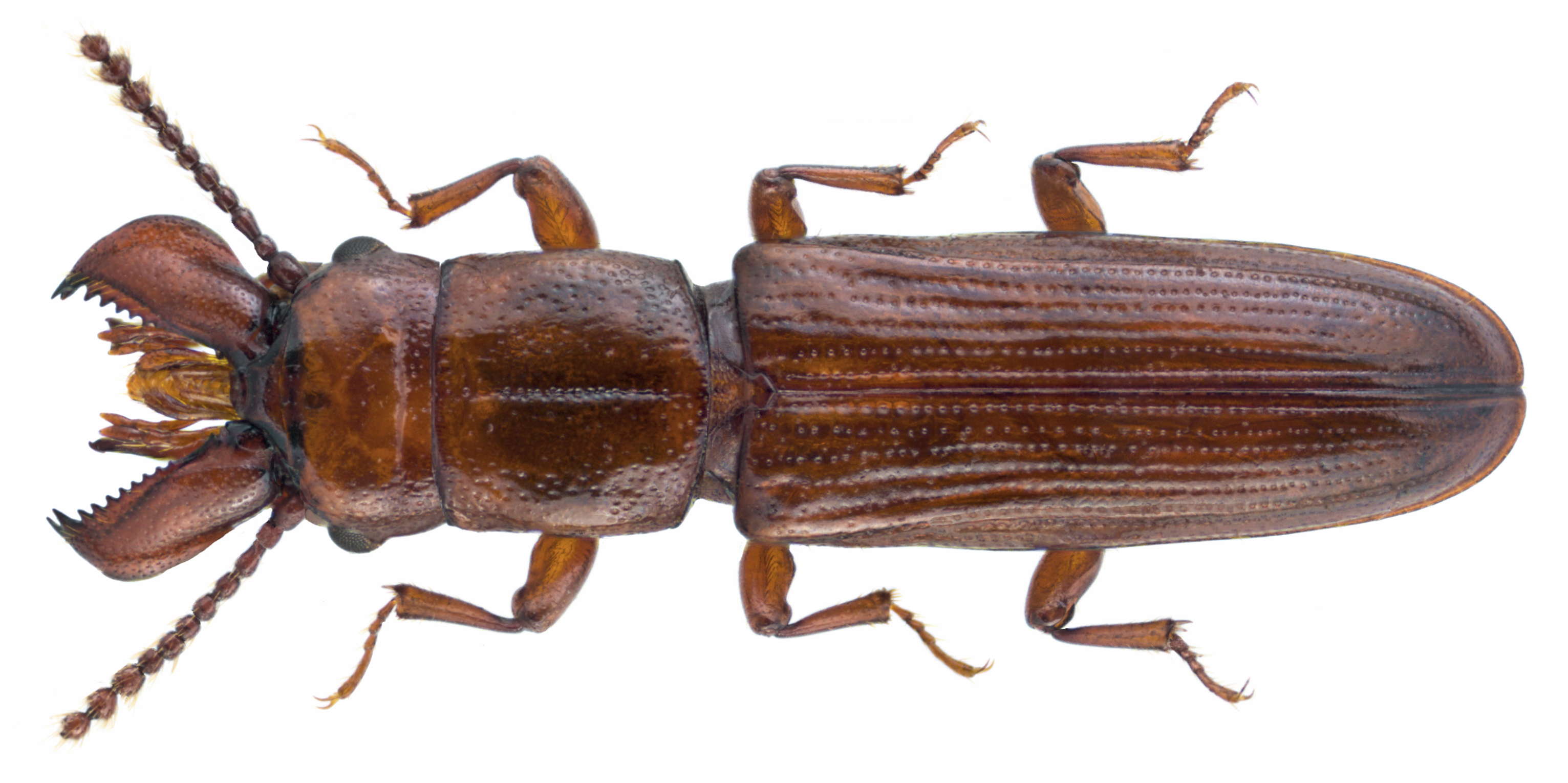
- Prostomis mandibularis
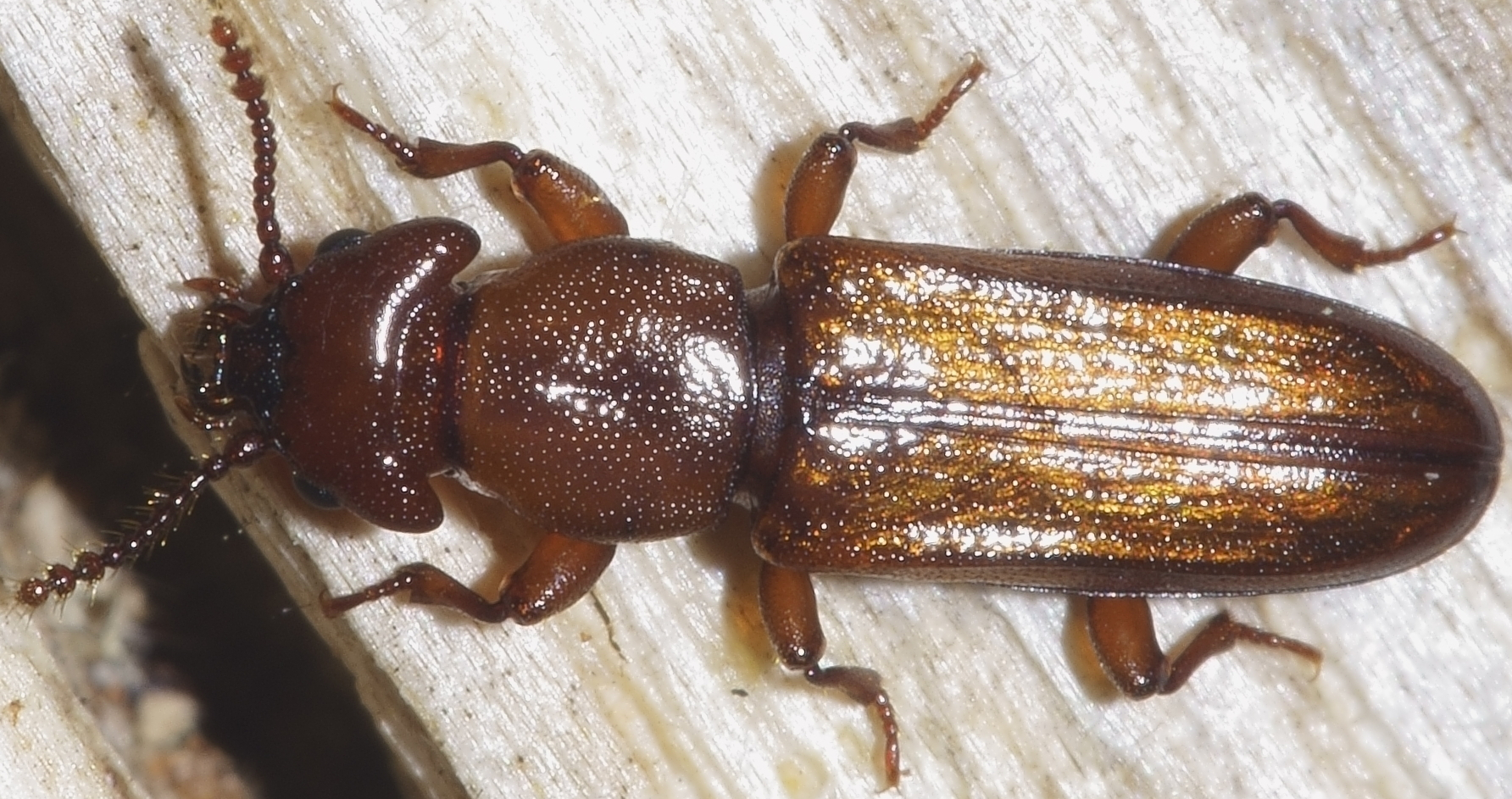
- Dryocora howitti

Scientific classification
- Kingdom: Animalia
- Phylum: Arthropoda
- Clade: Pancrustacea
- Class: Insecta
- Order: Coleoptera
- Suborder: Polyphaga
- Infraorder: Cucujiformia
- Superfamily: Tenebrionoidea
- Family: Prostomidae; C. G. Thomson, 1859

Genera
- Dryocora; Prostomis; †Vetuprostomis

= Prostomidae =

Prostomidae Temporal range: Cenomanian-Recent

Family of beetles

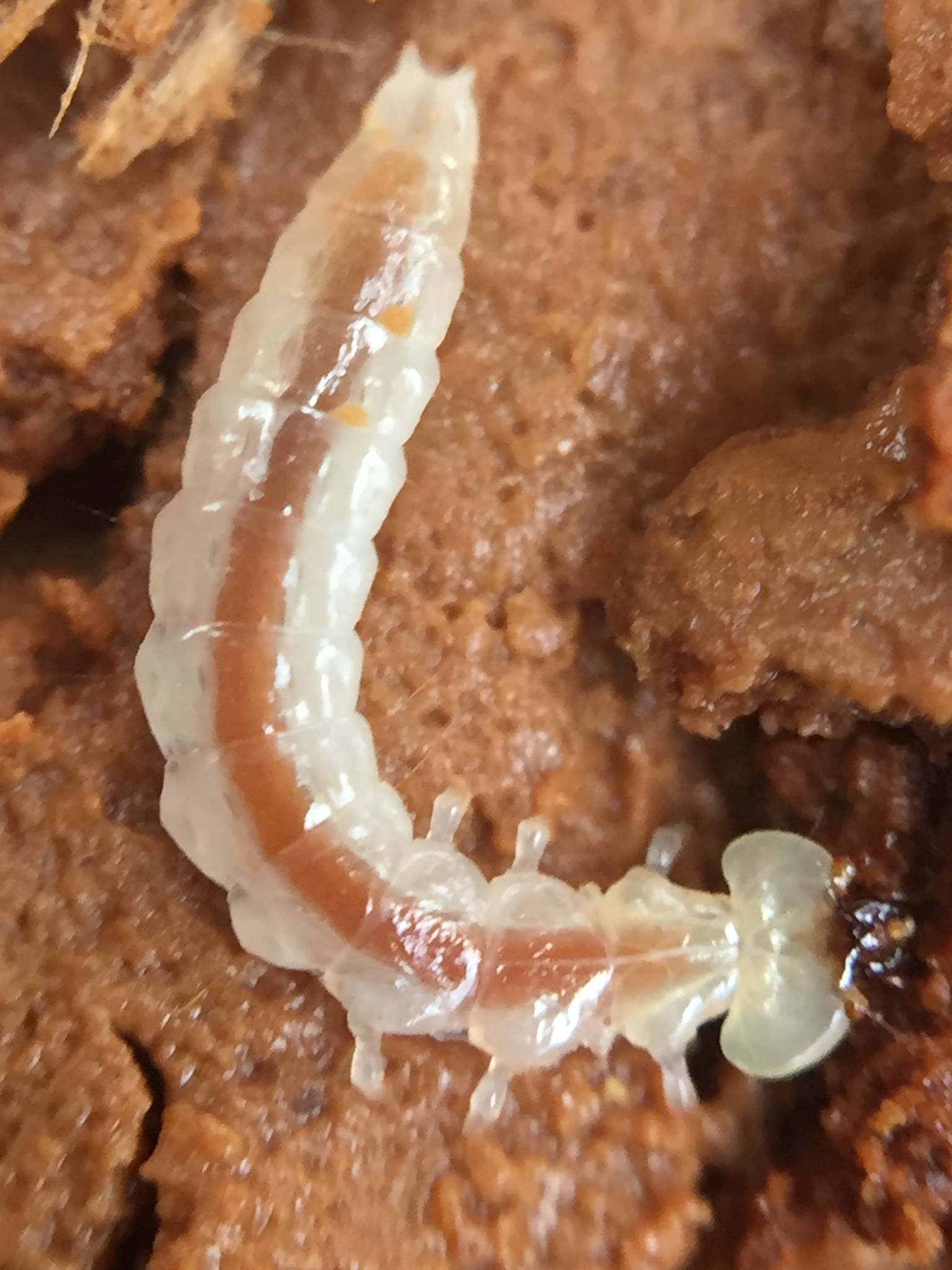
Larva of Dryocora howitti

Prostomidae is a family of beetles with no vernacular common name, though recent authors have coined the name jugular-horned beetles. They are often found in dead wood. The family consist of two extant genera with about 20 species. Prostomis americanus is known from North America. Other species of Prostomis are found in Europe, Africa, the Pacific region and East Asia. Species of Dryocora are known from New Zealand, Australia and Tasmania.

Prostomidae are elongate beetles with parallel sided elytra. They have the mandibles forward facing (prognathous) and have a large jugular process. The antennae are 11 segmented with a weak club formed by the last three segments. The large mandibles, small eyes, the elytra and pronotum of the same width, and a tarsal formula of 4-4-4 make them distinctive. Larvae and adults are found mainly inside fallen logs. The larvae feed on the rotten wood, particularly on the rotting heartwood of thick logs, as well as the mud-like matter found in red coloured decomposing wood.

An extinct genus, Vetuprostomis is known from several species described from mid-Cretaceous Burmese amber found in northern Myanmar. It is suggested to be more closely related to Dryocora than to Prostomis.
