= Solieriinae =

Scientific classification
- Kingdom: Animalia
- Phylum: Arthropoda
- Clade: Pancrustacea
- Class: Insecta
- Order: Coleoptera
- Suborder: Polyphaga
- Infraorder: Staphyliniformia
- Family: Staphylinidae
- Subfamily: Solieriinae; Newton & Thayer, 1992

Synonyms
- Physognathides Raffray, 1890; Physognathies Lacordaire, 1854; Fisognatitos Solier, 1849

Solieriinae is a subfamily of beetles in the family Staphylinidae. It was described in 1992 by Newton and Thayer. There are 12 species, split between four genera. They are found across Eurasia.

== Genera and species ==
Genus: Coiffaitia Kistner & Shower, 1965

- Coiffaitia manjarivolo Orousset, 1988
- Coiffaitia minor Kistner & Shower, 1965
- Coiffaitia peyrierasi Orousset, 1988
- Coiffaitia spectabilis Orousset, 1988
- Coiffaitia vadoni Orousset, 1988

Genus: Neocoiffaitia Orousset, 1988

- Neocoiffaitia anosyana Orousset, 1988

Genus: †Prosolierius Thayer, Newton & Chatzimanolis, 2012

- †Prosolierius crassicornis Thayer, Newton & Chatzimanolis, 2012
- †Prosolierius mixticornis Thayer, Newton & Chatzimanolis, 2012
- †Prosolierius parvus Peris, Chatzmanolis & Delcòs, 2014
- †Prosolierius tenuicornis Thayer, Newton & Chatzimanolis, 2012

Genus: Solierius Bernhaur, 1921

- Solierius obscurus (Solier, 1849)
