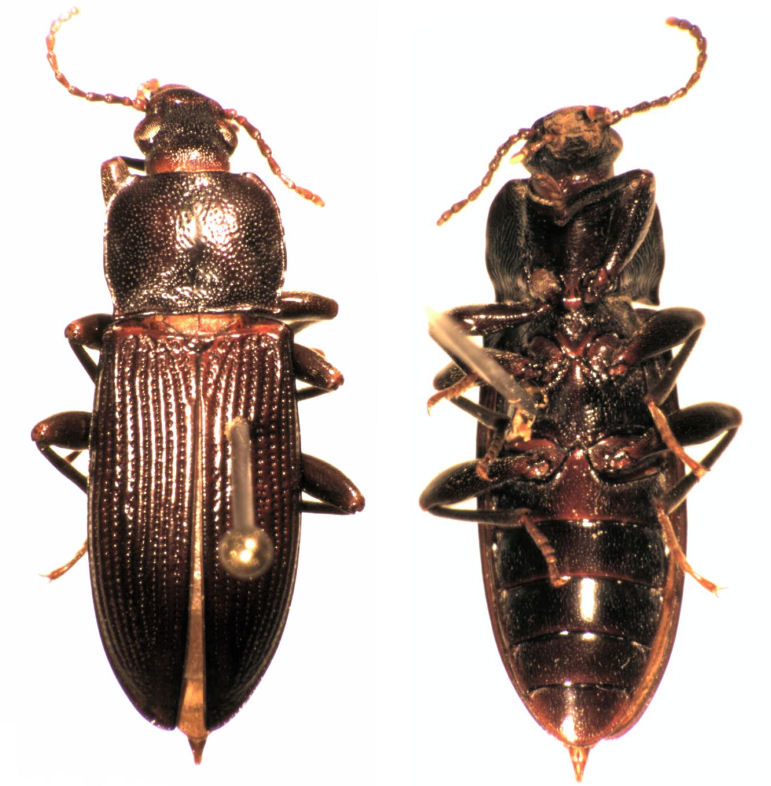
- Zolodinus zelandicus

Scientific classification
- Domain: Eukaryota
- Kingdom: Animalia
- Phylum: Arthropoda
- Class: Insecta
- Order: Coleoptera
- Suborder: Polyphaga
- Infraorder: Cucujiformia
- Family: Tenebrionidae
- Subfamily: Zolodininae; Watt, 1975

= Zolodininae =

Subfamily of beetles

Zolodininae is a subfamily of darkling beetles in the family Tenebrionidae. There are at least three genera in Zolodininae.

== Genera ==
These genera belong to the subfamily Zolodininae:

- Tanylypa Pascoe, 1869
- Zolodinus Blanchard, 1853
- † Praezolodinus Bao, 2020
