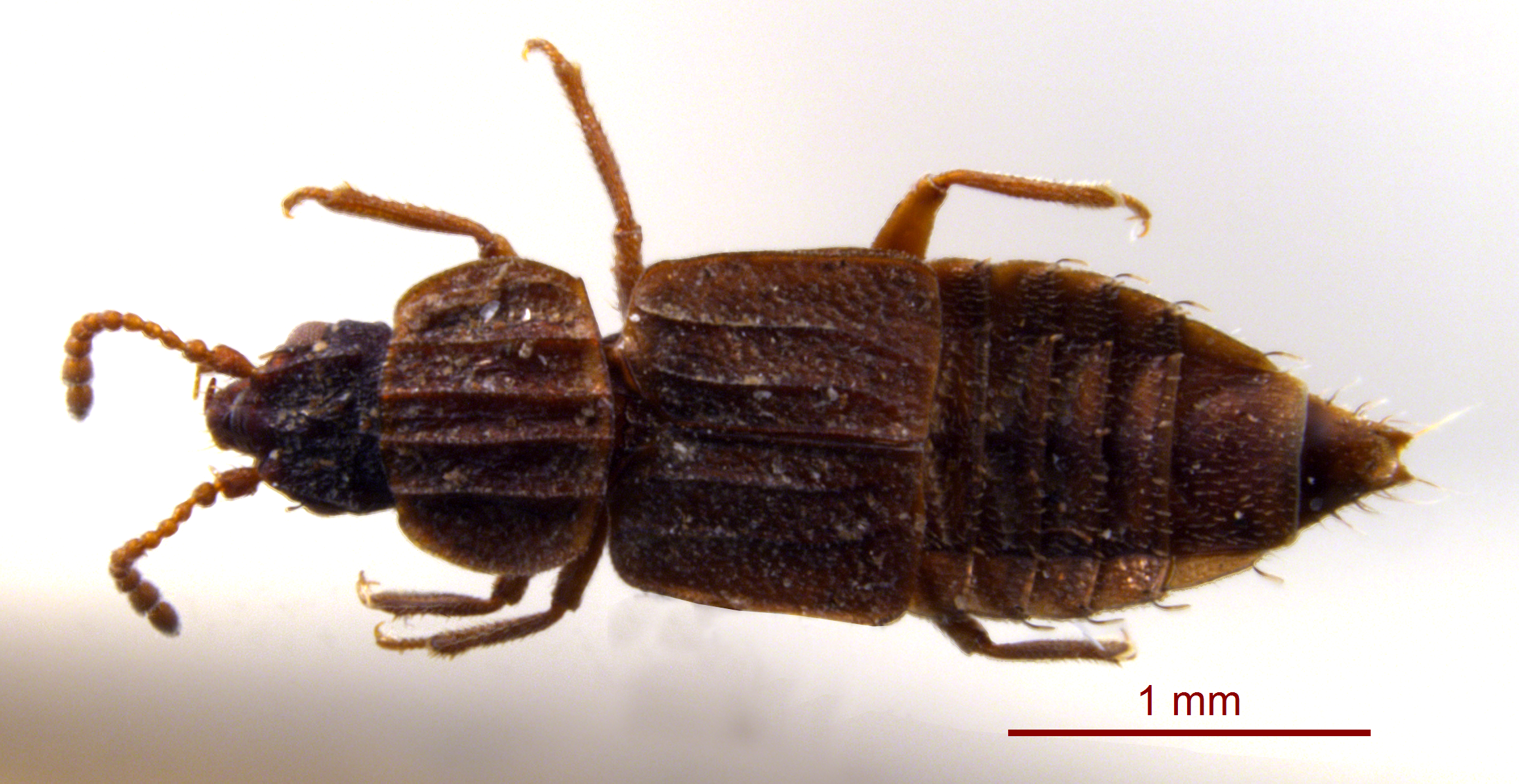
- Pseudopsis sulcata "complex"

Scientific classification
- Kingdom: Animalia
- Phylum: Arthropoda
- Clade: Pancrustacea
- Class: Insecta
- Order: Coleoptera
- Suborder: Polyphaga
- Infraorder: Staphyliniformia
- Family: Staphylinidae
- Subfamily: Pseudopsinae; Ganglbauer, 1895

= Pseudopsinae =

Subfamily of beetles

Pseudopsinae is a beetle subfamily of Staphylinidae. It was first described in 1895 by Ganglbauer

== Anatomy ==
- longitudinal carinae or costae on the head, pronotum, elytra, and sometimes head.
- fine stridulatory file one either side of the genital segment.
- tarsi 5-5-5, one species 3-3-3.

== Ecology ==
- Habitat: found in fungi, forest leaf litter, flood debris, moss along streams, dung, and mammal nests.
- Collection method: sift/Berlese leaf litter.
- Biology: poorly known.

== Systematics ==
Pseudopsinae contains 59 accepted species split between 6 genera.

- Asemobius
- Cretaceonanobius
- Cretopseudopsis
- Nanobius
- Pseudopsis
- Zalobius
