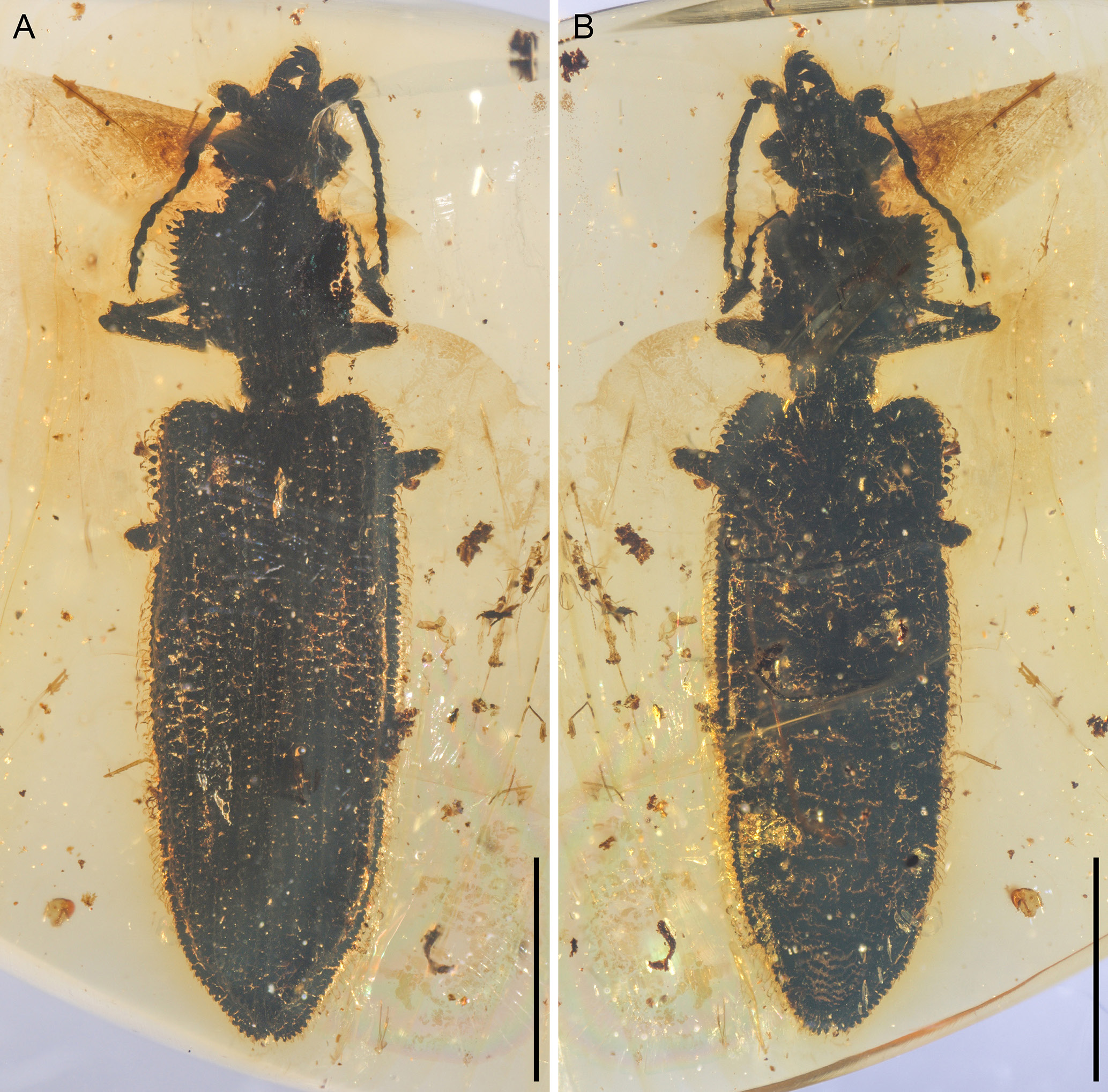
- Clessidromma palmeri

Scientific classification
- Domain: Eukaryota
- Kingdom: Animalia
- Phylum: Arthropoda
- Class: Insecta
- Order: Coleoptera
- Family: Ommatidae
- Genus: †Clessidromma; Jarzembowski et al. 2017
- Species: †C. palmeri

Binomial name
- †Clessidromma palmeri Jarzembowski et al. 2017

= Clessidromma =

Clessidromma Temporal range: Cenomanian

Extinct genus of beetles

Clessidromma is an extinct genus of ommatid beetle. It currently contains a single species Clessidromma palmeri, known from the Cenomanian aged Burmese amber of Myanmar. Kirejtshuk (2020) synonymised Lepidomma with Clessidromma and included two additional species in the latter: C. tianae, originally the type species of Lepidomma, and C. zengi, a newly described species. Li et al. (2021) disputed the synonymy of Lepidomma with Clessidromma, maintaining Lepidomma as a separate genus, and transferred C. zengi to a new genus, Kirejtomma, in 2021.
