= Lepidomma =

Lepidomma Temporal range: Cenomanian

Scientific classification
- Domain: Eukaryota
- Kingdom: Animalia
- Phylum: Arthropoda
- Class: Insecta
- Order: Coleoptera
- Family: Ommatidae
- Genus: †Lepidomma; Jarzembowski et al. 2019

Species
- †Lepidomma beuteli Song et al., 2022; †Lepidomma jarzembowskii Li et al., 2020; †Lepidomma longisquama Li et al., 2020; †Lepidomma tianae Jarzembowski et al. 2019 (type species)

Extinct genus of beetles

Lepidomma is an extinct genus of ommatid beetle. The genus was first described in 2019 for the species L. tianae. Lepidomma was synonymised with Clessidromma by Kirejtshuk, 2020. This synonymy was disputed by Li et al. (2021), who maintained Lepidomma as a separate genus from Clessidromma. Three additional species of Lepidomma were described in 2020 and 2022. All four species are known from the Cenomanian aged Burmese amber of Myanmar.
