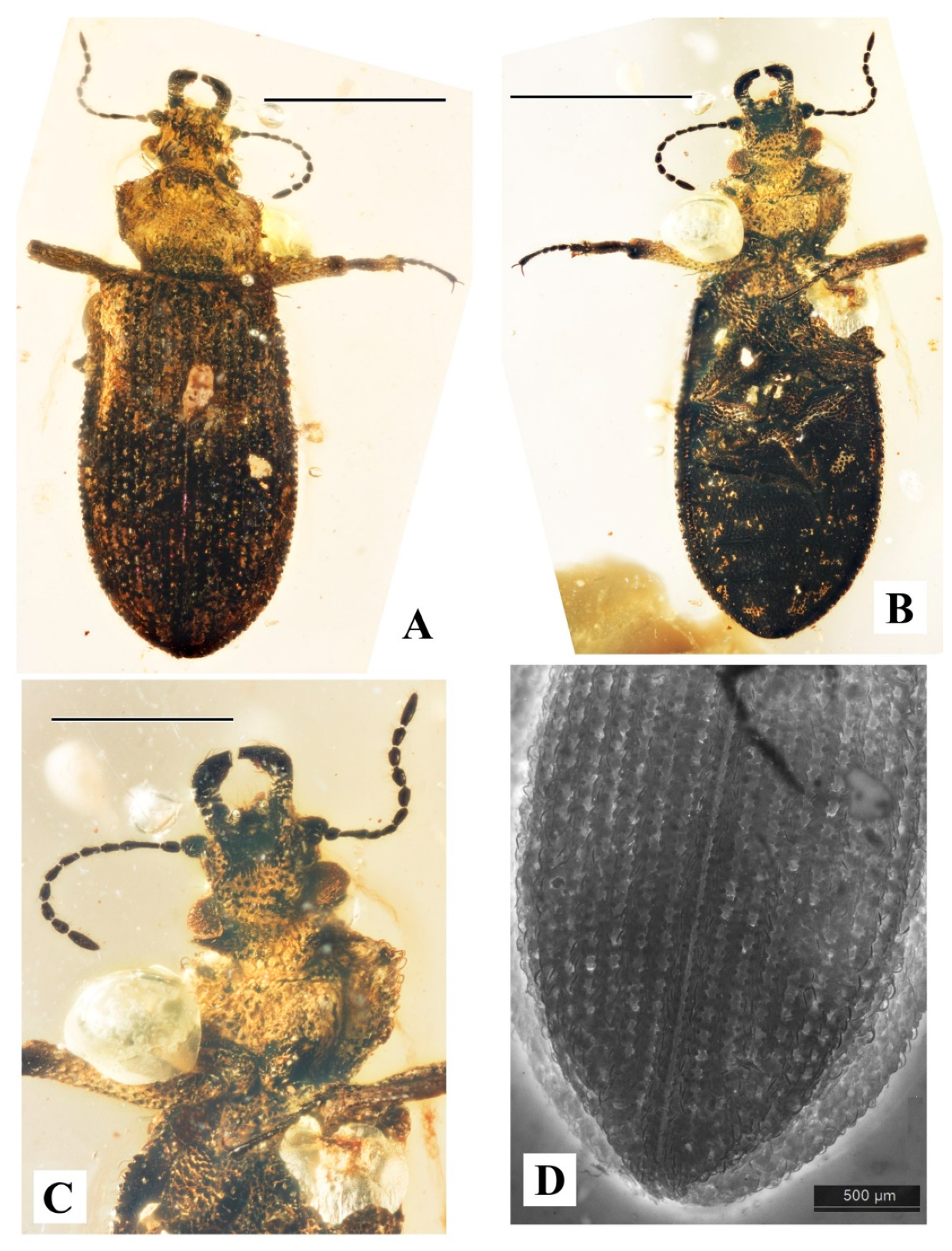

Scientific classification
- Kingdom: Animalia
- Phylum: Arthropoda
- Class: Insecta
- Order: Coleoptera
- Family: Ommatidae
- Genus: †Kirejtomma; Li & Cai, 2021
- Species: †K. zhengi

Binomial name
- †Kirejtomma zhengi (Kirejtshuk, 2020)

Synonyms
- Clessidromma zhengi

= Kirejtomma =

Kirejtomma Temporal range: Cenomanian

Extinct genus of beetles

Kirejtomma is an extinct genus of ommatid beetle, known from the early Late Cretaceous (Cenomanian) aged Burmese amber of Myanmar. The type and only known species K. zhengi was described in 2020 as a species of Clessidromma, and placed into the new genus in 2021.
