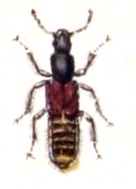
- Othius

Scientific classification
- Kingdom: Animalia
- Phylum: Arthropoda
- Class: Insecta
- Order: Coleoptera
- Suborder: Polyphaga
- Infraorder: Staphyliniformia
- Family: Staphylinidae
- Genus: Othius; Stephens, 1829

= Othius =

Genus of beetles

Othius is a genus of beetles belonging to the family Staphylinidae.

The species of this genus are found in Europe and Japan.

Species:

- Othius acifer Assing, 1998
- Othius acutus Assing, 1999
