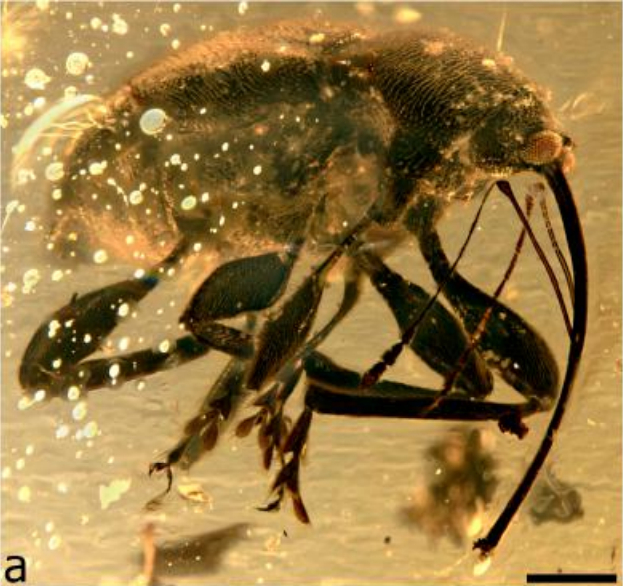
- Mekorhamphus beatae paratype

Scientific classification
- Kingdom: Animalia
- Phylum: Arthropoda
- Class: Insecta
- Order: Coleoptera
- Suborder: Polyphaga
- Infraorder: Cucujiformia
- Superfamily: Curculionoidea
- Family: †Mesophyletidae; Poinar, 2008

Subfamilies
- Aepyceratinae; Mesophyletinae

Synonyms
- Mesophyletinae; Mesophyletini

= Mesophyletidae =

Mesophyletidae Temporal range: Cenomanian

Extinct family of weevils

Mesophyletidae is an extinct family of weevils known from a number of genera preserved in Cretaceous amber. The family was first described as a subfamily in the extant family Caridae, and subsequently raised to family status in 2018.

== Distribution and paleoecology ==
The family is known exclusively from fossils preserved in Burmese amber, and combined with the Nemonychidae genera, the Burmese amber fauna is considered one of the richest weevil faunas of the Mesozoic, rivaling Kazakhstan's late Jurassic site at Karatau. The Burmese amber fossils preserve more detail than the compression fossils from Karatau. The amber paleoforest was tropical in temperature, and situated along the tidal boundary of a coastal estuary. The resin from which the amber originated is most likely araucarian, based on both inclusions of wood fragments and spectroscopic analysis.

Based on the elongated rostrum, antennae, and ovipositor structures; species in mesophyletidae were likely specialized herbivores which predated seeds and plant ovules in manners similar to that of the living Anthonomini, Curculionini, and related curculionid tribes. The legs are modified with elongated tarsi sporting large claws and tibia with strengthening ridges and a flattened or flared profile. These adaptations indicate an arboreal life of climbing on smooth or flimsy plant organs such as leaves and fruits. Additionally the elytra did not lock along the tips, and are loose to the pygidium which would allow for quick transition to flight, something the group was likely proficient at. They have enlarged eyes composed of coarse facets protruding on their heads, a feature seen in many weevil groups that spend their lives in dark canopies or in leaf litter.

== History and classification ==
Mesophyletis was the first genus of the group to be described, with its type description being published in 2006. The genus was placed into the family "Eccoptarthridae", an older name sometimes used for Caridae, as one of the genera in the subfamily Mesophyletinae by George Poinar Jr. However, in the 2006 paper, no type genus was specified in the subfamily description and a subsequent paper in 2008 specified Mesophyletis as the type genus. The subfamily Aepyceratinae was proposed in 2017 as a part of the family Nemonychidae based on perceived similarities between Aepyceratus hyperochus and the nemonychids.

The 2018 monograph on Burmese amber weevils expanded the group notably, and raised it to a full family, with two defined subfamilies, Aepyceratinae and Mesophyletinae. An additional five genera were described as part of Aepyceratinae, based on the structuring of the antennae, though the 2018 authors note that there are no other indications that the grouping is monophyletic.

== Subfamilies and genera ==
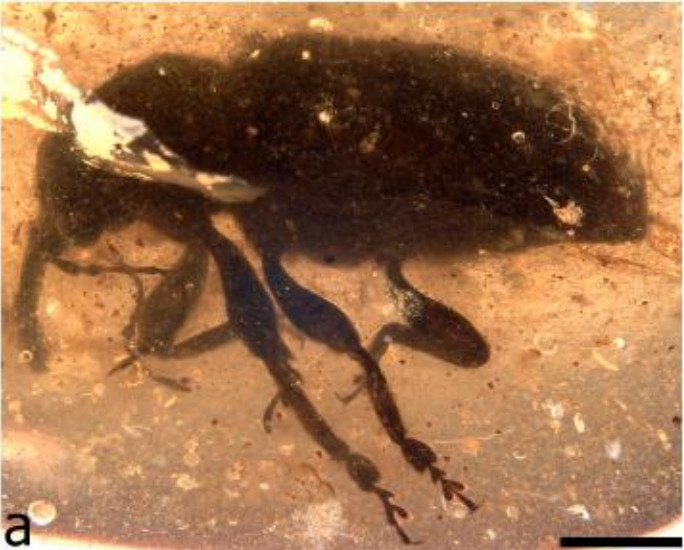
Burmophyletis beloides holotype

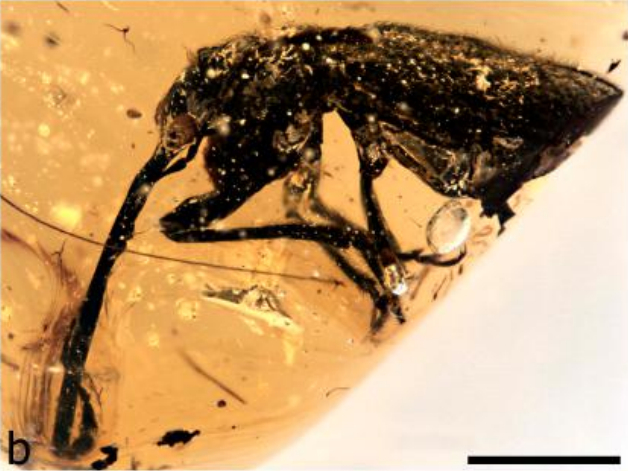
Rhynchitomimus chalybeus holotype

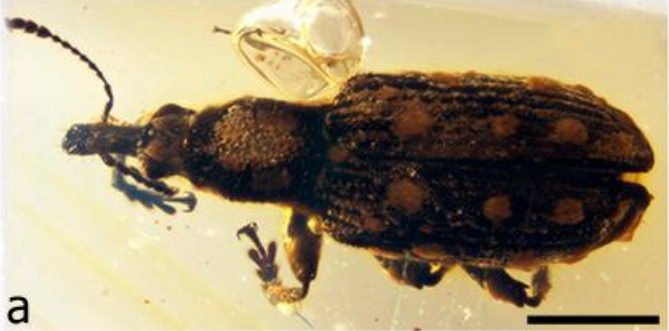
Nugatorhinus chenyangi holotype

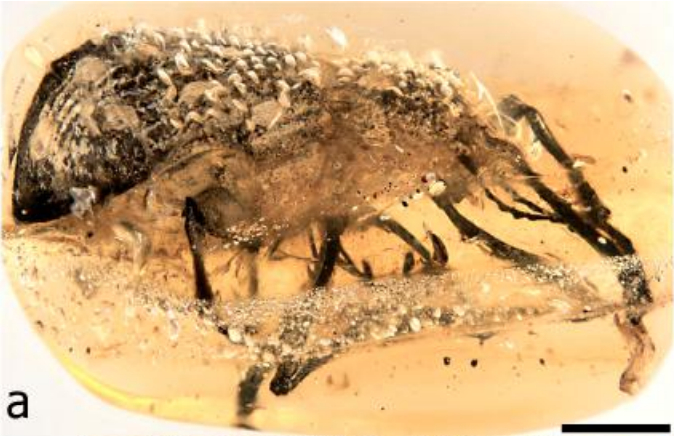
Nugatorhinus albomaculatus holotype

- Aepyceratinae Poinar, Brown, & Legalov, 2017
  - Acalyptopygus Clarke & Oberprieler, 2018
  - Aepyceratus Poinar, Brown, & Legalov, 2017
  - Burmophyletis Clarke & Oberprieler, 2019 (syn "Platychirus" Clarke & Oberprieler, 2018)
  - Calyptocis Clarke & Oberprieler, 2018
  - Nugatorhinus Clarke & Oberprieler, 2018
  - Rhynchitomimus Clarke & Oberprieler, 2018
- Mesophyletinae Poinar, 2008 (syn: Anchineini Poinar & Legalov, 2015; Burmocorynini Legalov, 2018; Mekorhamphini Poinar, Brown & Legalov, 2016)
  - Anchineus Poinar & Brown, 2009
  - Aphelonyssus Clarke & Oberprieler, 2018
  - Bowangius Clarke & Oberprieler, 2018
  - Burmocorynus Legalov, 2018
  - Burmorhinus Legalov, 2017
  - Cetionyx Clarke & Oberprieler, 2018
  - Compsopsarus Clarke & Oberprieler, 2018
  - Cyrtocis Clarke & Oberprieler, 2018
  - Debbia Clarke & Oberprieler, 2018
  - Echogomphus Clarke & Oberprieler, 2018
  - Electrocis Clarke & Oberprieler, 2018
  - Euryepomus Clarke & Oberprieler, 2018
  - Gnomus Clarke & Oberprieler, 2018
  - Habropezus Poinar, Brown, & Legalov, 2016
  - Hukawngius Clarke & Oberprieler, 2018
  - Leptopezus Clarke & Oberprieler, 2018
  - Louwiocis Clarke & Oberprieler, 2018
  - Mekorhamphus Poinar, Brown, & Legalov, 2016
  - Mesophyletis Poinar, 2006
  - Myanmarus Clarke & Oberprieler, 2018
  - Ocriocis Clarke & Oberprieler, 2018
  - Opeatorhynchus Clarke & Oberprieler, 2018
  - Periosocerus Clarke & Oberprieler, 2018
  - Petalotarsus Clarke & Oberprieler, 2018
  - Rhadinomycter Clarke & Oberprieler, 2018
  - Zimmiorhinus Clarke & Oberprieler, 2019 (syn: "Elwoodius" Clarke & Oberprieler, 2018)
