= Protopselaphus =

Scientific classification
- Missing taxonomy template (fix): Protopselaphus

Genus of beetles

Protopselaphus is a genus of beetles in the family Staphylinidae. It is the only genus in the subfamily Protopselaphinae. It was first described by Newton and Thayer in 1995. There are 10 accepted species.

== Species ==
- Protoselaphus burckhardti Newton & Thayer, 1995
- Protoselaphus crosoni Newton & Thayer, 1995
- Protoselaphus frogneri Newton & Thayer, 1995
- Protoselaphus grandis Newton & Thayer, 1995
- Protoselaphus loebli Newton & Thayer, 1995
- †Protoselaphus newtoni Liu, Yuchu, Tihelka & Chenyang Cai., 2020
- Protoselaphus poringensis Newton & Thayer, 1995
- Protoelaphus taylori Newton & Thayer, 1995
- †Protoselaphus thayerae Liu, Yuchu, Tihelka & Chenyang Cai., 2020
- Protoselaphus watrousi Newton & Thayer, 1995
