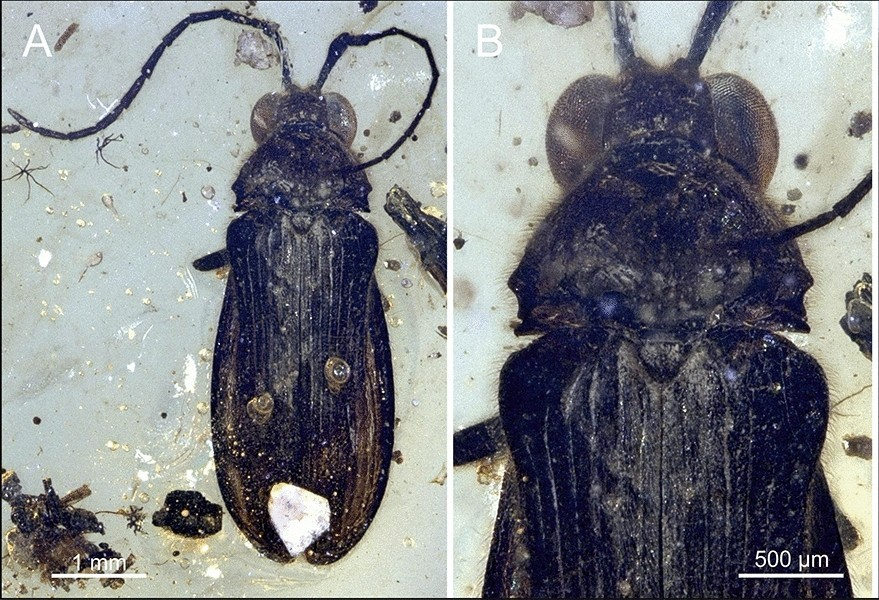

Scientific classification
- Kingdom: Animalia
- Phylum: Arthropoda
- Clade: Pancrustacea
- Class: Insecta
- Order: Coleoptera
- Suborder: Polyphaga
- Infraorder: Elateriformia
- Superfamily: Elateroidea
- Family: †Mysteriomorphidae; Alekseev and Ellenberger, 2019
- Genus: †Mysteriomorphus; Alekseev and Ellenberger, 2019

Type species
- †Mysteriomorphus pelevini Alekseev and Ellenberger, 2019

Other species
- Mysteriomorphus longelytrus (Qu, Jarzembowski and Luo, 2023)

Synonyms
- Trapezioceps Qu, Jarzembowski and Luo, 2023

= Mysteriomorphus =

Mysteriomorphus Temporal range: Cenomanian

Extinct genus of beetles

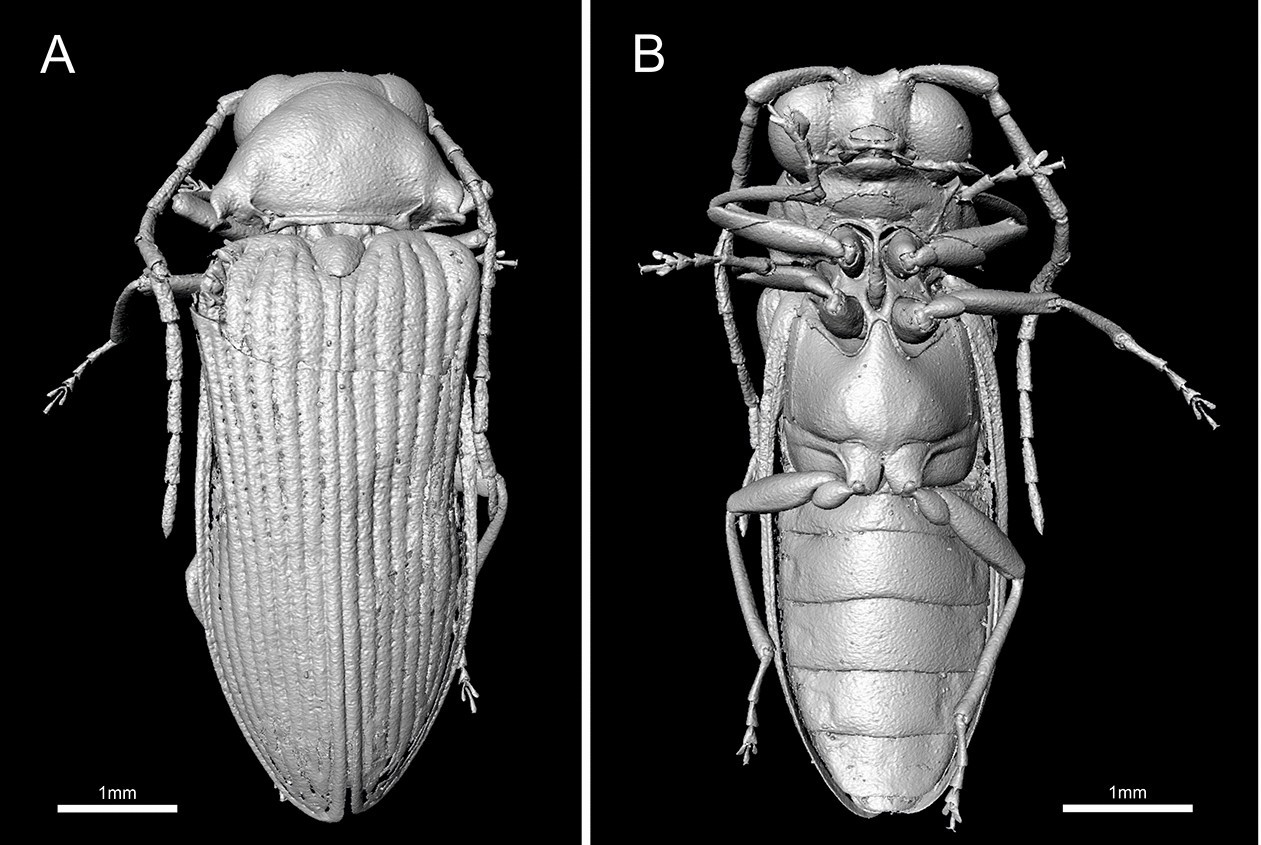
CT scan, showing dorsal (left) and ventral (right) views

Mysteriomorphus is an extinct genus of beetle, and the only member of the family Mysteriomorphidae. It is known from two described species, Mysteriomorphus pelevini and Mysteriomorphus longelytrus, found in Burmese amber dating to the early part of the Cenomanian stage of the Late Cretaceous, but more species are likely due to the morphological diversity of known specimens. It was initially placed in Elateriformia incertae sedis, but a subsequent study found that it was better placed within the Elateroidea, close to Elateridae.
