= 2017 in paleoentomology =

2017 in paleoentomology is a list of new fossil insect taxa that were described during the year 2017, as well as other significant discoveries and events related to paleoentomology that occurred during the year.

== New taxa ==
=== Coleopterans ===
Name	Novelty	Status	Authors	Age	Unit	Location	Notes	Images
Acylophorus hoffeinsorum	Sp. nov	Valid	Żyła & Solodovnikov	Eocene	Baltic amber	Europe (Baltic Sea coast)	A rove beetle. Brunke et al. (2019) made it the type species of a separate genus Eolophorus.	
Aepyceratus	Gen. et sp. nov	Valid	Poinar, Brown & Legalov	Late Cretaceous (Cenomanian)	Burmese amber	Myanmar	A weevil belonging to the family Nemonychidae. The type species is A. hyperochus.	
Airapus lithuanicus	Sp. nov	Valid	Tamutis, Alekseev & Bukejs	Eocene	Baltic amber	Lithuania	A member of the family Scarabaeidae belonging to the subfamily Aphodiinae and the tribe Eupariini.	
Albocryptophagus	Gen. et sp. nov	Valid	Peris, Lyubarsky & Perkovsky	Early Cretaceous (Albian)		Spain	A silken fungus beetle. The type species is A. cantabricus.	
Amberathyreus	Gen. et sp. nov	Valid	Bai & Zhang in Bai et al.	Cretaceous	Burmese amber	Myanmar	A dor beetle belonging to the tribe Athyreini. The type species is A. beuteli.	
Apodrosus canalinasus	Sp. nov	Valid	Poinar & Legalov	Eocene or Miocene	Dominican amber	Dominican Republic	A weevil belonging to the family Curculionidae, subfamily Entiminae and possibly the tribe Polydrosini; a species of Apodrosus.	
Apodrosus tinctocorpus	Sp. nov	Valid	Poinar & Legalov	Eocene or Miocene	Dominican amber	Dominican Republic	A weevil belonging to the family Curculionidae, subfamily Entiminae and possibly the tribe Polydrosini; a species of Apodrosus.	
Apophisandra	Gen. et sp. nov	Valid	Molino-Olmedo	Late Cretaceous (Cenomanian)	Burmese amber	Myanmar	Originally described as a longhorn beetle belonging to the subfamily Parandrinae; subsequently argued to be a sap beetle belonging to the subfamily Apophisandrinae or a member of the separate family Apophisandridae. Genus includes new species A. ammytae.	
Archaeodraena	Gen. et sp. nov	Valid	Jäch & Yamamoto in Yamamoto, Jäch & Takahashi	Late Cretaceous (Cenomanian)	Burmese amber	Myanmar	A member of the family Hydraenidae. The type species is A. cretacea.	
Archaeomalthodes	Gen. et sp. nov	Valid	Hsiao et al.	Late Cretaceous (Cenomanian)	Burmese amber	Myanmar	A soldier beetle belonging to the subfamily Malthininae. The type species is A. rosetta.	
Archaeoripiphorus	Gen. et sp. nov	Valid	Hsiao, Yu & Deng in Hsiao et al.	Middle Jurassic	Jiulongshan Formation	China	A member of Ripiphoridae. The type species is A. nuwa.	
Archaeozenodosus	Gen. et sp. nov	Valid	Yu & Kolibač in Yu et al.	Late Cretaceous (Cenomanian)	Burmese amber	Myanmar	A member of the family Thanerocleridae. The type species is A. bellus.	
Asida groehni	Sp. nov	Valid	Soldati & Nabozhenko	Eocene	Baltic amber	Russia (Kaliningrad Oblast)	A species of Asida.	
Attagenus burmiticus	Sp. nov	Valid	Cai, Háva & Huang	Late Cretaceous (Cenomanian)	Burmese amber	Myanmar	Originally described as a species of Attagenus, but Li, Huang & Cai (2022) subsequently transferred it to the dermestid subfamily Orphilinae, and to the separate genus Nothattagenus, while Háva (2023) transferred it to the genus Ranolus.	
Attagenus lundi	Sp. nov	Valid	Háva & Damgaard	Late Cretaceous (Cenomanian)	Burmese amber	Myanmar	A species of Attagenus.	
Attagenus secundus	Sp. nov	Valid	Deng et al.	Late Cretaceous	Burmese amber	Myanmar	A species of Attagenus.	
Barbaticupes	Gen. et sp. nov	Valid	Jarzembowski, Wang & Zheng	Late Cretaceous (Cenomanian)	Burmese amber	Myanmar	A member of the family Cupedidae. The type species is B. combertiae.	
Bembidion (Eodontium) bukejsi	Subgen. et sp. nov	Valid	Schmidt & Michalik	Eocene	Baltic amber	Curonian Spit	A species of Bembidion; the type species of the new subgenus Eodontium.	
Bembidion (Eupetedromus) alekseevi	Sp. nov	Valid	Schmidt & Michalik	Eocene	Baltic amber	Russia (Kaliningrad Oblast)	A species of Bembidion.	
Brochocoleus zhiyuani	Sp. nov	Valid	Liu et al.	Late Cretaceous (Cenomanian)	Burmese amber	Myanmar	A member of the family Ommatidae. Originally described as a species of Brochocoleus; Kirejtshuk (2020) transferred it to the genus Burmocoleus.	
Cascomastigus	Gen. et sp. nov	Disputed	Yin & Cai in Yin et al.	Late Cretaceous (Cenomanian)	Burmese amber	Myanmar	A rove beetle belonging to the subfamily Scydmaeninae and the tribe Mastigini. The type species is C. monstrabilis. Jałoszyński et al. (2018) considered the genus Cascomastigus to be a junior synonym of the genus Clidicostigus.	
Cathartosilvanus necromanticus	Sp. nov	Valid	Alekseev	Eocene	Baltic amber	Russia (Kaliningrad Oblast)	A species of Cathartosilvanus.	
Cenomaniola	Gen. et 2 sp. nov	Valid	Jałoszyński & Yamamoto in Jałoszyński, Yamamoto & Takahashi	Late Cretaceous (Cenomanian)	Burmese amber	Myanmar	An ant-like stone beetle belonging to the tribe Glandulariini. Genus includes new species C. carinata and C. macrophthalma.	
Ceracyclus	Gen. et 2 sp. nov	Valid	Boucher & Bai in Boucher et al.	Late Cretaceous (Cenomanian)	Burmese amber	Myanmar	A member of the family Passalidae belonging to the subfamily Aulacocyclinae. The type species is C. lotus Boucher, Bai & Montreuil; genus also includes C. jirouxi Boucher, Bai & Montreuil.	
Cessator brodzinskyi	Sp. nov	Valid	Ferreira & Ivie	Oligocene to Miocene	Dominican amber	Dominican Republic	A member of the family Lycidae belonging to the tribe Leptolycini.	
Clambus helheimricus	Sp. nov	Valid	Alekseev	Eocene	Baltic amber	Europe (Baltic Sea coast)	A member of the family Clambidae.	
Clessidromma	Gen. et sp. nov	Valid	Jarzembowski, Wang & Zheng	Late Cretaceous (Cenomanian)	Burmese amber	Myanmar	A member of Ommatinae. Genus includes new species C. palmeri.	Clessidromma palmeri
Clidicostigus	Gen. et sp. nov	Valid	Jałoszyński, Brunke & Bai in Jałoszyński et al.	Late Cretaceous (Cenomanian)	Burmese amber	Myanmar	An ant-like stone beetle belonging to the tribe Mastigini. The type species is C. arachnipes.	
Colonellus burmiticus	Sp. nov	Valid	Cai & Huang	Late Cretaceous (Cenomanian)	Burmese amber	Myanmar	A member of Leiodidae belonging to the subfamily Coloninae.	
Conotrachelus dysaethrius	Sp. nov	Valid	Poinar, Bukejs & Legalov	Quaternary		Colombia	A species of Conotrachelus.	
Corticaria amberica	Sp. nov	Valid	Reike et al.	Eocene	Baltic amber	Europe (Baltic Sea coast)	A species of Corticaria.	
Cossonus shevnini	Sp. nov	Valid	Bukejs & Legalov	Holocene	Madagascar Copal	Madagascar	A species of Cossonus.	
Cretagyrtodes	Gen. et sp. nov	Valid	Cai & Huang	Late Cretaceous (Cenomanian)	Burmese amber	Myanmar	A member of the family Leiodidae belonging to the subfamily Camiarinae and the tribe Agyrtodini. The type species is C. glabratus.	
Cretobythus	Gen. et sp. nov	Valid	Yin, Parker & Cai in Yin et al.	Late Cretaceous (Cenomanian)	Burmese amber	Myanmar	A stem-bythinine pselaphine rove beetle. The type species is C. excavatus.	
Cretocrenis	Gen. et sp. nov	Valid	Fikáček et al.	Cretaceous	Burmese amber	Myanmar	A member of the family Hydrophilidae. The type species is C. burmanicus.	
Cretodermestes	Gen. et sp. nov	Valid	Deng et al.	Late Cretaceous	Burmese amber	Myanmar	A member of the family Dermestidae belonging to the subfamily Attageninae. The type species is C. palpalis.	
Cretoleptochromus burmiticus	Sp. nov	Valid	Yin et al.	Cretaceous	Burmese amber	Myanmar	An ant-like stone beetle.	
Cretomysteria	Gen. et sp. nov	Valid	Denget al.	Late Cretaceous (Cenomanian)	Burmese amber	Myanmar	A member of the family Zopheridae. The type species is C. burmanica.	
Cretotrichopsenius	Gen. et sp. nov	Valid	Cai et al.	Cretaceous	Burmese amber	Myanmar	A rove beetle belonging to the subfamily Aleocharinae and the tribe Trichopseniini. The type species is C. burmiticus.	
Cycadophila mumia	Sp. nov	Valid	Alekseev & Bukejs	Eocene	Baltic amber	Europe (Baltic Sea coast)	A pleasing fungus beetle belonging to the subfamily Pharaxonothinae.	
Cydianerus eukrinus	Sp. nov	Valid	Poinar, Bukejs & Legalov	Quaternary		Colombia	A weevil belonging to the tribe Entimini.	
Darwinylus	Gen. et sp. nov	Valid	Peris	Early Cretaceous (late Albian)		Spain	A member of Oedemeridae. The type species is D. marcosi.	
Derolathrus abyssus	Sp. nov	Valid	Yamamoto, Takahashi & Parker	Late Cretaceous (Cenomanian)	Burmese amber	Myanmar	A member of Jacobsoniidae.	
Diaprepes anticus	Sp. nov	Valid	Franz & Zhang	Early Miocene	Dominican amber	Dominican Republic	A species of Diaprepes.	
Diaprepes squamula	Sp. nov	Valid	Poinar & Legalov	Eocene or Miocene	Dominican amber	Dominican Republic	A species of Diaprepes.	
Dolinelater	Nom. nov	Valid	Huber, Marggi & Menkveld-Gfeller	Late Jurassic	Karabastau Formation	Kazakhstan	A click beetle; a replacement name for Idiomorphus Dolin (1980).	
Electraesalopsis	Gen. et sp. nov	Valid	Bai, Zhang & Qiu in Qiu et al.	Late Cretaceous (Cenomanian)	Burmese amber	Myanmar	A stag beetle. The type species is E. beuteli.	
Ennoticus	Gen. et sp. nov	Valid	Lyubarsky & Perkovsky	Late Cretaceous (Santonian)	Taimyr amber	Russia	A member of the family Cryptophagidae. The type species is E. mnemosynon.	
Eoplatypus	Gen. et sp. nov	Valid	Cognato & Smith in Peris et al.	Eocene	Baltic amber	Europe (Baltic Sea coast)	A curculionid weevil belonging to the subfamily Platypodinae and the tribe Tesserocerini. The type species is E. jordali.	
Festenus	Gen. et 2 sp. nov	Valid	Żyła et al.	Late Cretaceous (Cenomanian)	Burmese amber	Myanmar	A rove beetle belonging to the subfamily Steninae. The type species is F. robustus; genus also includes F. gracilis.	
Gnathopeltos	Gen. et sp. nov	Valid	Yan, Beutel & Ponomarenko	Triassic		Kyrgyzstan	A member of Polyphaga belonging to the family Peltosynidae. The type species is G. dixis.	
Hemicoelus favonii	Sp. nov	Valid	Bukejs et al.	Eocene	Baltic amber	Europe (Baltic Sea coast)		
Holcoptera alisonae	Sp. nov	Valid	Kelly, Ross & Davidson	Early Jurassic (Sinemurian)	Charmouth Mudstone Formation	United Kingdom	A member of the family Coptoclavidae.	
Holcoptera pigmentatus	Sp. nov	Valid	Kelly, Ross & Davidson	Late Triassic (Rhaetian)	Penarth Group	United Kingdom	A member of the family Coptoclavidae.	
Holcoptera solitensis	Sp. nov	Valid	Kelly, Ross & Davidson	Late Triassic (Norian)	Cow Branch Formation	United States	A member of the family Coptoclavidae.	
Hyperstenichnus	Gen. et sp. nov	Valid	Jałoszyński & Perrichot in Jałoszyński, Perrichot & Peris	Late Cretaceous (Turonian)	Vendean amber	France	An ant-like stone beetle. The type species is H. vendeanus.	
Ischalia danieli	Sp. nov	Valid	Alekseev & Bukejs	Eocene	Baltic amber	Europe (Baltic Sea coast)	A member of Ischaliidae.	
Ischalia dohnaturris	Sp. nov	Valid	Alekseev & Bukejs	Eocene	Baltic amber	Europe (Baltic Sea coast)	A member of Ischaliidae.	
Istrisia vithlandica	Sp. nov	Valid	Alekseev	Eocene (Priabonian)	Prussian Formation (Baltic amber)	Russia (Kaliningrad Oblast)	A member of the family Salpingidae.	
Kuskaella	Gen. et sp. nov	Valid	Fanti & Kupryjanowicz	Eocene (Lutetian to Priabonian)	Baltic amber	Poland	A soldier beetle belonging to the subfamily Malthininae. The type species is K. macroptera.	
Lachnopus serraticrus	Sp. nov	Valid	Poinar & Legalov	Eocene or Miocene	Dominican amber	Dominican Republic	A weevil belonging to the family Curculionidae, subfamily Entiminae and the tribe Eustylini; a species of Lachnopus.	
Lemodicarmenia	Gen. et sp. nov	Valid	Molino-Olmedo	Late Cretaceous (Cenomanian)	Burmese amber	Myanmar	A member of Anthicidae belonging to the subfamily Lemodinae. Genus includes new species L. olmedoae.	
Lepicerus mumia	Sp. nov	Valid	Jałoszyński & Yamamoto in Jałoszyński, Yamamoto & Takahashi	Late Cretaceous (Cenomanian)	Burmese amber	Myanmar	A species of Lepicerus.	
Lepichelus	Nom. nov	Valid	Kirejtshuk	Late Cretaceous (Cenomanian)	Burmese amber	Myanmar	A member of Lepiceridae; a replacement name for Lepiceroides Kirejtshuk & Poinar (2013).	
Loricera groehni	Sp. nov	Valid	Cai, Liu & Huang	Eocene	Baltic amber	Europe (Baltic Sea coast)	A species of Loricera.	
Mallecupes	Gen. et 2 sp. nov	Valid	Jarzembowski, Wang & Zheng	Cretaceous	Burmese amber	Myanmar	A member of Cupedidae. The type species is M. qingqingae; genus also includes M. cleevelyi.	
Malthodes caenozoicus	Sp. nov	Valid	Fanti & Vitali	Early Oligocene	Baltic amber	Lithuania	A soldier beetle.	
Malthodes michalskii	Sp. nov	Valid	Fanti	Eocene	Baltic amber	Europe (Baltic Sea coast)	A soldier beetle.	
Mantimalthinus	Gen. et sp. nov	Valid	Fanti & Castiglione	Eocene (Lutetian–Priabonian)	Baltic amber	Poland	A soldier beetle belonging to the subfamily Malthininae. The type species is M. balticus.	
Megatoma atypica	Sp. nov	Valid	Deng et al.	Late Cretaceous	Burmese amber	Myanmar	A member of the family Dermestidae. Originally described as a species of Megatoma, but subsequently transferred to the separate genus Cretomegatoma.	
Menatorhis	Gen. et comb. nov	Valid	Legalov, Kirejtshuk & Nel	Paleocene		France	A weevil; a new genus for "Balaninus" elegans Piton (1940).	
Mesosmicrips	Gen. et comb. nov	Valid	Kirejtshuk	Late Cretaceous (Cenomanian)	Burmese amber	Myanmar	A member of Smicripidae; a new genus for "Smicrips" cretacea Cai & Huang (2016).	
Michalskantharis	Gen et sp. nov	Valid	Fanti	Eocene	Baltic amber	Europe (Baltic Sea coast)	A soldier beetle. The type species is M. bursztynica.	
Mimoplatycis bicolor	Sp. nov	Valid	Fanti & Vitali	Early Oligocene	Baltic amber	Europe (Baltic Sea coast)	A soldier beetle.	
Molinernobius	Gen. et sp. nov	Valid	Molino-Olmedo	Late Cretaceous (Cenomanian)	Burmese amber	Myanmar	A member of the subfamily Ernobiinae. Genus includes new species M. fuentesi.	
Myamalycocerus	Gen. et sp. nov	Valid	Fanti & Ellenberger	Late Cretaceous (Cenomanian	Burmese amber	Myanmar	A soldier beetle. The type species is M. vitalii.	
Ofthalmopeltos	Gen. et sp. nov	Valid	Yan, Beutel & Ponomarenko	Triassic		Kyrgyzstan	A member of Polyphaga belonging to the family Peltosynidae. The type species is O. synkritos.	
Olemehliella	Nom. nov	Valid	Batelka	Eocene (Lutetian)	Baltic amber	Lithuania	A member of Ripiphoridae belonging to the subfamily Ripidiinae; a replacement name for Olemehlia Batelka (2012).	
Omma daxishanense	Sp. nov	Valid	Cai & Huang	Late Jurassic	Tiaojishan Formation	China	A species of Omma.	
Omma lii	Sp. nov	Valid	Jarzembowski, Wang & Zheng	Late Cretaceous (Cenomanian)	Burmese amber	Myanmar	A species of Omma.	
Oropsis	Gen. et sp. nov	Valid	Legalov, Azar & Kirejtshuk	Early Cretaceous		Lebanon	A weevil belonging to the family Nemonychidae. The type species is O. marinae.	
Oxyporus cretaceous	Sp. nov	Valid	Yamamoto	Late Cretaceous (Cenomanian	Burmese amber	Myanmar	A rove beetle belonging to the subfamily Oxyporinae.	
Palaeoboganium	Gen. et sp. nov	Valid	Liu et al.	Daohugou Beds	Mexican amber	China	A member of the family Boganiidae. Genus includes new species P. jurassicum.	
Palaeoiresina	Gen. et sp. nov	Valid	Wiesner, Will & Schmidt	Eocene	Baltic amber	Europe (southeastern coast of the Baltic Sea)	A tiger beetle. The type species is P. cassolai.	
Palaeomesoporus	Gen. et sp. nov	Valid	Yamamoto & Maruyama	Eocene	Baltic amber	Poland	A rove beetle belonging to the subfamily Aleocharinae. The type species is Palaeomesoporus electiricus.	
Palaeopronyssiformia	Gen. et sp. nov	Valid	Wiesner, Will & Schmidt	Eocene	Baltic amber	Europe (southeastern coast of the Baltic Sea)	A tiger beetle. The type species is P. groehni.	
Palaeosclerum	Gen. et sp. nov	Valid	Nabozhenko & Kirejtshuk	Middle Paleocene		France	A darkling beetle. Genus includes new species P. pohli.	
Paleoendeitoma	Gen. et 2 sp. nov	Valid	Denget al.	Late Cretaceous (Cenomanian)	Burmese amber	Myanmar	A member of the family Zopheridae belonging to the subfamily Colydiinae and the tribe Synchitini. The type species is P. antennata; genus also includes P. minuta.	
Palorus platycotyloides	Sp. nov	Valid	Alekseev & Nabozhenko	Eocene	Baltic amber	Russia (Kaliningrad Oblast)	A darkling beetle.	
Paradermestes	Gen. et sp. nov	Valid	Deng et al.	Middle Jurassic	Jiulongshan Formation	China	A member of the family Dermestidae. The type species is P. jurassicus.	
Paraodontomma	Gen. et sp. nov	Valid	Yamamoto	Late Cretaceous (Cenomanian)	Burmese amber	Myanmar	A member of the family Ommatidae belonging to the tribe Brochocoleini. The type species is P. burmitica.	Paraodontomma szwedoi, species named in 2018
Peltosyne varyvrosa	Sp. nov	Valid	Yan, Beutel & Ponomarenko	Triassic		Kyrgyzstan	A member of Polyphaga belonging to the family Peltosynidae.	
Pentarthrum inclusus	Sp. nov	Valid	Bukejs & Legalov	Holocene	Madagascar Copal	Madagascar	A species of Pentarthrum.	
Perapion menatensis	Sp. nov	Valid	Legalov, Kirejtshuk & Nel	Paleocene		France	A weevil belonging to the family Brentidae.	
Petropsis	Gen. et sp. nov	Valid	Legalov, Kirejtshuk & Nel	Paleocene		France	A relative of the New York weevil. Genus includes new species P. rostrata.	
Ponomarenkia	Gen. et sp. nov	Junior homonym	Yan et al.	Late Permian	Newcastle Coal Measures	Australia	A beetle of uncertain phylogenetic placement, assigned to the new family Ponomarenkiidae. The type species is P. belmonthensis. The generic name turned out to be preoccupied by Ponomarenkia Perkovsky (2001); Yan et al. (2018) coined a replacement name Ponomarenkium.	
Praeanchodemus	Gen. et sp. nov	Valid	Schmidt, Göpel & Will	Eocene	Baltic amber	Europe (Baltic Sea coast)	A ground beetle belonging to the tribe Platynini. The type species is P. punctaticeps.	
Prajna	Gen. et sp. nov	Valid	Lü, Cai & Huang	Cretaceous	Burmese amber	Myanmar	A rove beetle belonging to the subfamily Oxytelinae and the tribe Thinobiini. The type species is P. tianmiaoae.	
Promecops (Promecodes) divarichela	Sp. nov	Valid	Poinar & Legalov	Eocene or Miocene	Dominican amber	Dominican Republic	A weevil belonging to the family Curculionidae, subfamily Entiminae and the tribe Eudiagogini; a species of Promecops.	
Protonicagus	Gen. et sp. nov	Valid	Cai et al.	Late Cretaceous (Cenomanian)	Burmese amber	Myanmar	A stag beetle belonging to the subfamily Aesalinae and the tribe Nicagini. The type species is P. tani.	
Qitianniu	Gen. et sp. nov	Valid	Lin & Bai	Cretaceous	Burmese amber	Myanmar	A longhorn beetle. The type species is Q. zhihaoi.	
Sarothrias cretaceus	Sp. nov	Valid	Cai et al.	Late Cretaceous	Burmese amber	Myanmar	A member of the family Jacobsoniidae.	
Scelianoma compacta	Sp. nov	Valid	Franz & Zhang	Early Miocene	Dominican amber	Dominican Republic	A member of Curculionidae.	
Serramorphus	Gen. et sp. nov	Valid	Lyubarsky & Perkovsky	Late Eocene	Bitterfeld amber	Germany	A member of Erotylidae belonging to the subfamily Languriinae and the tribe Thallisellini. The type species is S. rasnitsyni.	
Stenommatus copalicus	Sp. nov	Valid	Poinar, Bukejs & Legalov	Quaternary		Colombia	A weevil belonging to the tribe Dryophthorini.	
Tetraphalerus lindae	Sp. nov	Valid	Jarzembowski, Wang & Zheng	Late Cretaceous (Cenomanian)	Burmese amber	Myanmar	Originally described as a species of Tetraphalerus; Kirejtshuk (2020) transferred this species to the ommatine genus Bukhkalius.	Bukhkalius lindae
Tillomorphites otiliae	Sp. nov	Valid	Vitali	Eocene	Baltic amber	Europe (Baltic Sea coast)	A longhorn beetle.	
Tillomorphites spinipes	Sp. nov	Valid	Vitali	Eocene	Baltic amber	Europe (Baltic Sea coast)	A longhorn beetle.	
Trichodesma amberica	Sp. nov	Valid	Zahradník & Háva	Eocene	Baltic amber	Russia (Kaliningrad Oblast)	A species of Trichodesma.	
Trichodesma electra	Sp. nov	Valid	Zahradník & Háva	Eocene	Baltic amber	Russia (Kaliningrad Oblast)	A species of Trichodesma.	
Trichodesma groehni	Sp. nov	Valid	Zahradník & Háva	Eocene	Baltic amber	Russia (Kaliningrad Oblast)	A species of Trichodesma.	
Tropirhinus palpebratus	Sp. nov	Valid	Franz & Zhang	Early Miocene	Dominican amber	Dominican Republic	A member of Curculionidae.	
Tympanophorus greenwalti	Sp. nov	Valid	Chatzimanolis, Brunke & Schillhammer in Brunke, Schillhammer & Chatzimanolis	Eocene	Kishenehn Formation	United States	A rove beetle belonging to the subfamily Staphylininae, the tribe Staphylinini and the subtribe Anisolinina.	
Wabbel	Gen. et sp. nov	Valid	Alekseev	Eocene	Baltic amber	Russia (Kaliningrad Oblast)	A member of Cucujoidea belonging to the new family Wabbelidae. The type species is W. cerebricavus.	
Xenophagus	Gen. et sp. nov	Valid	Lyubarsky & Perkovsky	Late Eocene	Baltic amber	Russia (Kaliningrad Oblast)	A pleasing fungus beetle belonging to the subfamily Xenoscelinae. The type species is X. popovi.	

=== Dermapterans ===
Name	Novelty	Status	Authors	Age	Unit	Location	Notes	Images
Gracilipygia	Gen. et sp. nov	Valid	Ren et al.	Late Cretaceous (Cenomanian)	Burmese amber	Myanmar	An earwig belonging to the family Pygidicranidae and the subfamily Pyragrinae. The type species is G. canaliculata.	
Stonychopygia	Gen. et sp. nov	Valid	Engel et al.	Late Cretaceous (Cenomanian)	Burmese amber	Myanmar	An earwig belonging to the family Pygidicranidae. The type species is S. leptocerca.	

=== Dictyopterans ===
Name	Novelty	Status	Authors	Age	Unit	Location	Notes	Images
Balatronis	Gen. et 2 sp. nov	Valid	Šmídová & Lei	Cretaceous (Barremian-Cenomanian)	Burmese amber Lebanese amber	Lebanon; Myanmar	A cockroach. Originally described as a member of Blattidae; Qiu et al. (2020) considered it to be a cockroach of uncertain phylogenetic placement. The type species is B. cretacea Šmídová & Lei (2017); genus also includes B. libanensis Sendi & Azar (2017).	
Ol	Gen. et sp. nov	Valid	Vršanský & Wang	Late Cretaceous (Cenomanian)	Burmese amber	Myanmar	A cockroach; originally assigned to the new family Olidae, but subsequently transferred to the family Corydiidae. Genus includes new species O. xiai.	

=== Dipterans ===
Name	Novelty	Status	Authors	Age	Unit	Location	Notes	Images
Archirhagio gracilentus	Sp. nov	Valid	Wang et al.	Middle Jurassic	Jiulongshan Formation	China	A member of Archisargidae.	
Avenaphora gallica	Sp. nov	Valid	Nel, Garrouste & Daugeron	Late Cretaceous (Santonian)		France	A member of Dolichopodidae.	
Bibio aquaesextiae	Sp. nov	Valid	Skartveit & Nel	Oligocene		France	A member of Bibionidae, a species of Bibio.	
Bibio edda	Sp. nov	Valid	Skartveit, Grímsson & Wappler	Late Miocene	Skarðsströnd–Mókollsdalur Formation	Iceland	A member of Bibionidae, a species of Bibio.	
Bibiodes provincialis	Sp. nov	Valid	Skartveit & Nel	Oligocene		France	A member of Bibionidae.	
Boreofairchildia dominicana	Sp. nov	Valid	Wagner	Miocene	Dominican amber	Dominican Republic	A drain fly belonging to the subfamily Bruchomyiinae.	
Camptopterohelea odora	Sp. nov.	Valid	Stebner et al.	Eocene (Ypresian)	Cambay Formation	India	A member of the family Ceratopogonidae.	
Cretomicrophorus piolencensis	Sp. nov	Valid	Nel, Garrouste & Daugeron	Late Cretaceous (Santonian)		France	A member of Dolichopodidae.	
Cyrtinella	Gen. et sp. nov	Valid	Gillung & Winterton	Eocene	Baltic amber	Europe (Baltic Sea coast)	A member of Acroceridae belonging to the subfamily Acrocerinae. Genus includes new species C. flavinigra.	
Dohrniphora calvata	Sp. nov	Valid	Solórzano Kraemer & Brown	Early Middle Miocene	Dominican amber	Dominican Republic	A member of the family Phoridae.	
Dohrniphora kraemergabi	Sp. nov	Valid	Solórzano Kraemer & Brown	Early Middle Miocene	Dominican amber	Dominican Republic	A member of the family Phoridae.	
Dohrniphora mexicana	Sp. nov	Valid	Solórzano Kraemer & Brown	Early Middle Miocene	Mexican amber	Mexico	A member of the family Phoridae.	
Dohrniphora minoris	Sp. nov	Valid	Solórzano Kraemer & Brown	Early Middle Miocene	Dominican amber	Dominican Republic	A member of the family Phoridae.	
Dohrniphora paleocircularis	Sp. nov	Valid	Solórzano Kraemer & Brown	Early Middle Miocene	Dominican amber	Dominican Republic	A member of the family Phoridae.	
Dohrniphora processa	Sp. nov	Valid	Solórzano Kraemer & Brown	Early Middle Miocene	Dominican amber	Dominican Republic	A member of the family Phoridae.	
Dohrniphora quasicornuta	Sp. nov	Valid	Solórzano Kraemer & Brown	Early Middle Miocene	Dominican amber	Dominican Republic	A member of the family Phoridae.	
Dohrniphora quinti	Sp. nov	Valid	Solórzano Kraemer & Brown	Early Middle Miocene	Dominican amber	Dominican Republic	A member of the family Phoridae.	
Dohrniphora saepis	Sp. nov	Valid	Solórzano Kraemer & Brown	Early Middle Miocene	Dominican amber	Dominican Republic	A member of the family Phoridae.	
Dohrniphora translucendi	Sp. nov	Valid	Solórzano Kraemer & Brown	Early Middle Miocene	Dominican amber	Dominican Republic	A member of the family Phoridae.	
Dohrniphora volkswageni	Sp. nov	Valid	Solórzano Kraemer & Brown	Early Middle Miocene	Dominican amber	Dominican Republic	A member of the family Phoridae.	
Eohelea indica	Sp. nov	Valid	Stebner & Szadziewski in Stebner et al.	Early Eocene	Cambay amber	India	A biting midge.	
Espanoderus	Gen. et sp. nov	Valid	Skibińska, Krzemiński & Arillo	Early Cretaceous	Álava amber	Spain	A member of the family Tanyderidae. Genus includes new species E. barbarae.	
Ferneiella gallica	Sp. nov	Valid	Bramuzzo, Coty & Nel	Earliest Eocene	Oise amber	France	A member of Scatopsidae.	
Flagellisargus (Changbingisargus) parvus	Subgen. et sp. nov	Valid	Zhang	Jurassic (Callovian-Oxfordian)	Daohugou Beds	China	A member of Archisargidae.	
Furcobuchonomyia	Gen. et 2 sp. nov	Valid	Baranov, Góral & Ross	Late Cretaceous (Cenomanian)	Burmese amber	Myanmar	A member of Chironomidae belonging to the subfamily Buchonomyiinae. Genus includes new species F. saetheri Baranov, Góral & Ross (2017) and F. pankowskii Giłka & Zakrzewska (2017).	
Ganseriella	Gen. et sp. nov	Valid	Fedotova & Perkovsky in Perkovsky & Fedotova	Late Cretaceous (Cenomanian)	Burmese amber	Myanmar	A member of Cecidomyiidae belonging to the subfamily Porricondylinae and the tribe Diallactiini. The type species is G. pankowskiorum.	
Gedanohelea gerdesorum	Sp. nov	Valid	Stebner & Szadziewski in Stebner et al.	Early Eocene	Cambay amber	India	A biting midge.	
Grimmenia tillyardi	Sp. nov	Valid	Kopeć et al.	Early Jurassic (Toarcian)		United Kingdom	A member of the family Limoniidae belonging to the subfamily Architipulinae.	
Hoffeinsodes	Gen. et 5 sp. nov et comb.	Valid	Wagner	Eocene	Baltic amber	Europe (Baltic Sea coast)	A drain fly belonging to the subfamily Bruchomyiinae. Genus includes new species H. obtusa, H. bifida, H. cubicula, H. longicauda and H. reducta, as well as H. hoffeinsi (Wagner, 2006).	
Hoffeinsomyia	Gen. et sp. nov	Valid	Gillung & Winterton	Eocene	Baltic amber	Europe (Baltic Sea coast)	A member of Acroceridae belonging to the subfamily Philopotinae. Genus includes new species H. leptogaster.	
Indorrhina	Gen. et sp. nov	Valid	Stebner & Grimaldi in Stebner et al.	Early Eocene	Cambay Formation	India	A member of Sciaroidea belonging to the family Lygistorrhinidae. The type species is I. sahnii.	
Krassiloviola	Gen. et sp. nov	Valid	Fedotova & Perkovsky	Late Cretaceous (Santonian)	Taimyr amber	Russia	A gall midge. Genus includes new species K. geniusloci.	
Leptotarsus (sensu lato) ribeiroi	Sp. nov	Valid	Krzemiński, Kopeć & Kania	Early Cretaceous	Santana Formation	Brazil	A crane fly.	
Lygistorrhina indica	Sp. nov	Valid	Stebner & Grimaldi in Stebner et al.	Early Eocene	Cambay Formation	India	A member of Sciaroidea belonging to the family Lygistorrhinidae.	
Lysistrata burmensis	Sp. nov	Valid	Liu, Cai & Huang	Late Cretaceous (Cenomanian)	Burmese amber	Myanmar	A soldier fly.	
Mesembrinella caenozoica	Sp. nov	Valid	Cerretti et al.	Miocene	Dominican amber	Dominican Republic	A member of Oestroidea belonging to the family Mesembrinellidae.	Mesembrinella caenozoica
Mesonemestrius	Gen. et sp. nov	Valid	Zhang, Zhang & Wang	Late Cretaceous (Cenomanian)	Burmese amber	Myanmar	A member of Nemestrinidae belonging to the subfamily Archinemestriinae. The type species is M. caii.	
Meunierohelea borkenti	Sp. nov	Valid	Stebner & Szadziewski in Stebner et al.	Early Eocene	Cambay amber	India	A biting midge.	
Meunierohelea cambayana	Sp. nov	Valid	Stebner & Szadziewski in Stebner et al.	Early Eocene	Cambay amber	India	A biting midge.	
Meunierohelea orientalis	Sp. nov	Valid	Stebner & Szadziewski in Stebner et al.	Early Eocene	Cambay amber	India	A biting midge.	
Microphorites erikai	Sp. nov	Valid	Bramuzzo & Nel	Eocene	Oise amber	France	A member of Dolichopodidae.	
Palaeoglaesum	Gen. et comb. et 3 sp. nov	Valid	Wagner	Late Cretaceous	Burmese amber	Myanmar	A drain fly belonging to the subfamily Bruchomyiinae. Genus includes "Nemopalpus" quadrispiculatus Stebner et al. (2015) and "Nemopalpus" velteni Wagner (2012), as well as new species P. muelleri, P. bisulcum and P. notandum.	
Palaeognoriste orientale	Sp. nov	Valid	Stebner & Grimaldi in Stebner et al.	Early Eocene	Cambay Formation	India	A member of Sciaroidea belonging to the family Lygistorrhinidae.	
Penthetria luberonica	Sp. nov	Valid	Skartveit & Nel	Oligocene		France	A member of Bibionidae, a species of Penthetria.	
Penthetria lugens	Sp nov	jr synonym	Oustalet, 1870	Oligocene		France	A bibionid, new combination for Protomyia lugens	Penthetria lugens
Plecia larteti	Comb. nov	Valid	(Oustalet, 1870)	Oligocene		France	A bibionid, new combination for Bibio lartetii	Plecia larteti
Plecia theobaldi	Nom. nov	Valid	Skartveit & Nel	Oligocene		France	A member of Bibionidae, a species of Plecia; a replacement name for Bibio nigripennis Théobald (1937).	
Prophilopota variegata	Sp. nov	Valid	Gillung & Winterton	Eocene	Baltic amber	Europe (Baltic Sea coast)	A member of Acroceridae belonging to the subfamily Philopotinae.	
Rovnoholoneurus	Gen. et 2 sp. et comb. nov	Valid	Fedotova & Perkovsky	Late Eocene	Rovno amber	Ukraine	A member of Cecidomyiidae belonging to the subfamily Porricondylinae and the tribe Holoneurini. The type species is R. davidi; genus also includes new species R. miyae, as well as "Bryocrypta" laqueata Fedotova in Fedotova & Perkovsky (2005).	
Sinonemestrius completus	Sp. nov	Valid	Zhang	Early Cretaceous	Laiyang Formation	China	A member of Heterostomidae.	

=== Hemipterans ===
Name	Novelty	Status	Authors	Age	Unit	Location	Notes	Images
Ambaraphis baikurensis	Sp. nov	Valid	Perkovsky & Węgierek	Cretaceous (Albian–early Cenomanian)	Ognevka Formation (Taimyr amber)	Russia	A member of the family Palaeoaphididae.	
Burmissus	Gen. et sp. nov	Valid	Shcherbakov	Cretaceous (Albian–Cenomanian)	Burmese amber	Myanmar	A planthopper belonging to the family Mimarachnidae. The type species is B. raunoi.	
Christometra	Gen. et sp. nov	Valid	Pêgas, Leal & Damgaard	Early Cretaceous	Crato Formation	Brazil	A member of the family Hydrometridae. The type species is C. paradoxa.	
Cicadocoris parvus	Sp. nov	Valid	Jiang & Huang	Middle Jurassic	Haifanggou Formation	China	A moss bug belonging to the family Progonocimicidae.	
Cixius discretus	Sp. nov	Valid	Li et al.	Early Miocene	Garang Formation	China	A species of Cixius.	
Cryptostemma eocenica	Sp. nov	Valid	Hartung, Garrouste & Nel	Early Eocene		France	A member of Dipsocoromorpha belonging to the family Dipsocoridae.	
Feroorbis	Gen. et sp. nov	Valid	Węgierek & Huang in Węgierek et al.	Late Cretaceous (Cenomanian)	Burmese amber	Myanmar	An aphid belonging to the family Szelegiewicziidae. Genus includes new species F. burmensis.	
Foveopsis heteroidea	Sp. nov	Valid	Zhang, Ren & Yao	Late Cretaceous (Cenomanian)	Burmese amber	Myanmar	A planthopper belonging to the family Perforissidae.	
Gedanotropis	Gen. et sp. nov	Valid	Szwedo & Stroiński	Eocene (Lutetian)	Baltic amber	Europe (Gdańsk Bay area)	A planthopper belonging to the family Tropiduchidae and the subfamily Elicinae. The type species is G. sontagae.	
Hallakkungis	Gen. et sp. nov		Nam, Wang & Szwedo in Nam et al.	Late Triassic	Amisan Formation	South Korea	A member of Palaeontinidae. The type species is H. amisanus.	Hallakkungis amisanus
Glaesivelia	Gen. et sp. nov	Valid	Sánchez-García & Solórzano Kraemer in Sánchez-García et al.	Early Cretaceous (late Albian)		Spain	A member of Gerromorpha belonging to the family Mesoveliidae. The type species is G. pulcherrima.	
Iberovelia	Gen. et sp. nov	Valid	Sánchez-García & Nel in Sánchez-García et al.	Early Cretaceous (late Albian)		Spain	A member of Gerromorpha belonging to the family Mesoveliidae. The type species is I. quisquilia.	
Isolitaphis	Gen. et sp. nov	Valid	Poinar	Cretaceous	Burmese amber	Myanmar	An aphid belonging to the new family Isolitaphidae or to the family Juraphididae. Genus includes new species I. prolatantennus.	
Mapuchea pinoi	Sp. nov	Valid	Campodonico, Faúndez & Ashworth	Late Pleistocene		Chile	A member of Membracoidea belonging to the family Myerslopiidae.	
Oviparosiphum stictum	Sp. nov	Valid	Fu et al.	Early Cretaceous	Yixian Formation	China	A member of Aphidomorpha belonging to the family Oviparosiphidae.	
Priscacutius	Gen. et sp. nov	Valid	Poinar & Brown	Cretaceous	Burmese amber	Myanmar	A leafhopper. The type species is P. denticulatus.	
Shufania	Gen. et sp. nov	Valid	Chen et al.	Jurassic (Callovian–Oxfordian)	Daohugou Beds	China	A froghopper belonging to the family Sinoalidae. The type species is S. hani.	
Tinaphis mongolica	Sp. nov	Valid	Żyła & Węgierek in Węgierek et al.	Late Jurassic		Mongolia	An aphid belonging to the family Szelegiewicziidae.	
Triassonepa	Gen. et sp. nov	Valid	Criscione & Grimaldi	Triassic	Cow Branch Formation	United States	A member of the family Belostomatidae. The type species is T. solensis.	
Vitimaphis subridens	Sp. nov	Valid	Żyła, Homan & Węgierek	Early Cretaceous	Baissa locality	Russia	An aphid.	
Xulsigia	Gen. et sp. nov	Valid	Szwedo, Weis & Nel	Early Jurassic (Toarcian)		Luxembourg	A member of Sternorrhyncha, possibly belonging to the group Pincombeomorpha. The type species is X. karetsa.	

=== Hymenopterans ===
Name	Novelty	Status	Authorship of new name	Age	Unit	Location	Notes	Images
Aptenoperissus	Gen. et sp. nov	Valid	Rasnitsyn, Poinar & Brown	Late Cretaceous (Cenomanian)	Burmese amber	Myanmar	A member of Ceraphronoidea. The type species is A. burmanicus.	Aptenoperissus burmanicus
Archaeoteleia astropulvis	Sp. nov	Valid	Talamas in Talamas et al.	Late Cretaceous (Cenomanian)	Burmese amber	Myanmar	A member of Platygastroidea.	
Archeofoenus	Gen. et sp. nov	Valid	Engel	Late Cretaceous (Cenomanian)	Burmese amber	Myanmar	A member of Aulacidae belonging to the subfamily Hyptiogastritinae. The type species is A. tartaricus.	
Bellohelorus	Gen. et sp. nov	Valid	Li, Shih & Ren	Early Cretaceous	Yixian Formation	China	A member of Proctotrupoidea belonging to the family Heloridae. Genus includes new species B. fortis.	
Boltonimecia	Gen. et comb. nov	Valid	Borysenko	Late Cretaceous	Canadian amber	Canada	An ant, a relative of Zigrasimecia. The type species is "Sphecomyrma" canadensis Wilson (1985).	Boltonimecia canadensis
Bombus (Cullumanobombus) trophonius	Sp. nov	Valid	Prokop et al.	Early Miocene	Most Formation	Czech Republic	A bumblebee.	Bombus trophonius
Caloichneumon	Gen. et sp. nov	Valid	Li et al.	Late Cretaceous (Cenomanian)	Burmese amber	Myanmar	A member of Ichneumonidae. The type species is C. perrarus.	
Caputelus	Gen. et comb. nov	Valid	Waichert & Pitts in Rodriguez et al.	Eocene (Priabonian)	Florissant Fossil Beds	United States	A spider wasp. The type species is "Hemipogonius" scudderi Cockerell (1906).	
Curiosivespa striata	Sp. nov	Valid	Perrard, Grimaldi & Carpenter	Early Cretaceous (late Albian)	Burmese amber	Myanmar	A member of the family Vespidae.	
Curiosivespa zigrasi	Sp. nov	Valid	Perrard, Grimaldi & Carpenter	Early Cretaceous (late Albian)	Burmese amber	Myanmar	A member of the family Vespidae.	
Deuteragenia catalunyia	Sp. nov	Valid	Rodriguez, Waichert & Pitts in Rodriguez et al.	Miocene (Messinian)		Spain	A spider wasp.	
Dolichoderus tavridus	Sp. nov	Valid	Perfilieva, Dubovikoff & Dlussky	Miocene		Crimean Peninsula	An ant, a species of Dolichoderus.	
Electrofoenops	Gen. et sp. nov	Valid	Engel	Late Cretaceous (Cenomanian)	Burmese amber	Myanmar	A member of Aulacidae related to Electrofoenus. The type species is E. diminuta.	
Enneamerus costatus	Sp. nov		Radchenko & Dlussky	Eocene (Priabonian)	Baltic amber	Europe (Baltic Sea coast)	An ant.	
Eosega	Gen. et sp. nov	Valid	Martynova & Perkovsky	Late Eocene	Baltic amber	Russia (Kaliningrad Oblast)	A cuckoo wasp. The type species is E. heterotarsata.	
Florimena	Gen. et sp. nov	Valid	Antropov	Late Eocene	Florissant Fossil Beds National Monument	United States	A member of the family Crabronidae belonging to the subfamily Pemphredoninae. The type species is F. impressa.	
Foveorisus	Gen. et sp. nov	Valid	Martynova & Perkovsky	Late Eocene	Rovno amber	Ukraine	A cuckoo wasp. The type species is F. kilimniki.	
Geoscelio	Gen. et sp. nov	Valid	Engel & Huang in Engel et al.	Late Cretaceous (Cenomanian)	Burmese amber	Myanmar	A member of Scelionidae. The type species is G. mckellari.	
Ghilarella alexialis	Sp. nov	Valid	Kopylov & Rasnitsyn	Early Cretaceous		Mongolia	A member of the family Sepulcidae.	
Ghilarella masculina	Sp. nov	Valid	Kopylov & Rasnitsyn	Early Cretaceous		Russia	A member of the family Sepulcidae.	
Juraserphus	Gen. et sp. nov	Valid	Zheng & Chen	Middle Jurassic (Callovian)	Jiulongshan Formation	China	A member of Proctotrupoidea belonging to the family Mesoserphidae.	
Karatavites ningchengensis	Sp. nov	Valid	Shih, Li & Ren	Middle Jurassic (Callovian)	Jiulongshan Formation	China	A member of the family Karatavitidae.	
Lagenostephanus	Gen. et sp. nov	Valid	Li, Rasnitsyn, Shih & Ren in Li et al.	Late Cretaceous (Cenomanian)	Burmese amber	Myanmar	A member of Stephanidae. The type species is L. lii.	
Linguamyrmex	Gen. et sp. nov	Valid	Barden & Grimaldi	Late Cretaceous (Cenomanian)	Burmese amber	Myanmar	An ant belonging to the tribe Haidomyrmecini. The type species is L. vladi.	Linguamyrmex vladi
Micramphilius mirabilipennis	Sp. nov	Valid	Kopylov & Rasnitsyn	Early Cretaceous		Russia	A member of Sepulcidae.	
Mirolyda	Gen. et sp. nov		Wang, Rasnitsyn & Ren in Wang et al.	Middle Jurassic (late Callovian)	Jiulongshan Formation	China	A member of Pamphilioidea belonging to the new family Mirolydidae. The type species is M. hirta.	
Novhelorus	Gen. et sp. et comb. nov	Valid	Li, Shih & Ren	Early Cretaceous	Yixian Formation	China	A member of Proctotrupoidea belonging to the family Heloridae. Genus includes new species N. macilentus, as well as "Spherogaster" saltatrix Shi et al. (2013).	
Novichneumon	Gen. et sp. nov	Valid	Li et al.	Late Cretaceous (Cenomanian)	Burmese amber	Myanmar	A member of Ichneumonidae. The type species is N. longus.	
Oecophylla taurica	Sp. nov	Valid	Perfilieva, Dubovikov & Dlussky	Miocene		Crimean Peninsula	A weaver ant.	
Onokhoius venustus	Sp. nov	Valid	Kopylov & Rasnitsyn	Early Cretaceous		Russia	A member of Sepulcidae.	
Paleoepeolus	Gen. et sp. nov	Valid	Dehon et al.	Paleocene		France	A bee belonging to the family Apidae, subfamily Nomadinae and the tribe Epeolini. The type species is P. micheneri.	
Pamparaphilius khasurtensis	Sp. nov	Valid	Kopylov & Rasnitsyn	Early Cretaceous		Russia	A member of Sepulcidae.	
Pepsinites	Gen. et comb. nov	Valid	Rodriguez & Waichert in Rodriguez et al.	Eocene	Baltic amber Florissant Fossil Beds	Baltic Sea coast France; United States	A collective-group name for all fossil members of Pepsinae for which the generic position is unclear because of lack of diagnostic characters in preserved specimens. Includes "Pompilus" scelerosus Meunier (1917), "Pepsis" avitula Cockerell (1941), "Hemipogonius" florissantensis Cockerell (1906), "Salius" laminarum Rohwer (1909), "Criptochilus" contentus Theobald (1937) and "Agenia" cockerellae Rohwer (1909).	
Phoriostephanus	Gen. et sp. nov	Valid	Engel & Huang	Late Cretaceous (Cenomanian)	Burmese amber	Myanmar	Originally described as a member of Stephanidae; Rasnitsyn & Öhm-Kühnle (2021) reinterpreted it as a member of Roproniidae. The type species is P. exilis.	
Pompilinites	Gen. et comb. nov	Valid	Rodriguez & Waichert in Rodriguez et al.	Oligocene		France; Germany	A collective-group name for all fossil members of Pompilinae for which the generic position is unclear because of lack of diagnostic characters in preserved specimens. Includes "Pompilus" coquandi Theobald (1937) and "Psammochares" depressa Statz (1936).	
Pompilites	Gen. et comb. nov	Valid	Rodriguez in Rodriguez et al.	Eocene–Miocene	Florissant Fossil Beds	France; Germany; United States	A collective-group name for all fossil species of spider wasps for which the subfamilial and generic position is unclear because of lack of diagnostic characters in preserved specimens. Includes "Pompilus" induratus Heer (1849), "Pompilus" fasciatus Theobald (1937), "Pompilus" incertus Theobald (1937) and "Salius" senex Rohwer (1909).	
Praeratavites rasnitsyni	Sp. nov	Valid	Shih, Li & Ren	Middle Jurassic (Callovian)	Jiulongshan Formation	China	A member of the family Karatavitidae.	
Proteroscelio nexus	Sp. nov	Valid	Talamas in Talamas et al.	Late Cretaceous (Cenomanian)	Burmese amber	Myanmar	A member of Platygastroidea.	
Protocopidosoma	Gen. et sp. nov	Valid	Simutnik & Perkovsky	Late Eocene		Denmark	A member of the family Encyrtidae. Genus includes new species P. kononovae.	
Protocyrtus parilis	Sp. nov	Valid	Li, Shih & Ren	Early Cretaceous	Yixian Formation	China	A member of Proctotrupoidea belonging to the family Heloridae.	
Protovespa	Gen. et sp. nov	Valid	Perrard, Grimaldi & Carpenter	Early Cretaceous (late Albian)	Burmese amber	Myanmar	A member of the family Vespidae. Genus includes new species P. haxairei.	
Rhetinorhyssalites	Gen. et sp. nov	Valid	Engel, Thomas & Alqarni	Late Cretaceous (Turonian)	Raritan Formation	United States	A member of Braconidae belonging to the subfamily Protorhyssalinae. The type species is R. emersoni.	
Solenopsis atavinus	Sp. nov	Valid	Perfilieva, Dubovikov & Dlussky	Miocene		Crimean Peninsula	A fire ant.	
Stigmomyrmex rugulosus	Sp. nov	Valid	Radchenko & Dlussky	Eocene (Priabonian)	Baltic amber Bitterfeld amber	Baltic Sea coast Germany	An ant.	
Trematothorax brachyurus	Sp. nov	Valid	Kopylov & Rasnitsyn	Early Cretaceous		Russia	A member of the family Sepulcidae.	
Trematothorax extravenosus	Sp. nov	Valid	Kopylov & Rasnitsyn	Early Cretaceous		Russia	A member of the family Sepulcidae.	
Trematothorax zhangi	Sp. nov	Valid	Kopylov & Rasnitsyn	Early Cretaceous		Russia	A member of the family Sepulcidae.	
Xenodellitha	Gen. et sp. nov	Valid	Engel	Late Cretaceous (Cenomanian)	Burmese amber	Myanmar	A member of Evanioidea belonging to the family Othniodellithidae. The type species is X. preta.	

=== Mecopterans ===
Name	Novelty	Status	Authors	Age	Unit	Location	Notes	Images
Burmobittacus	Gen. et sp. nov	Valid	Zhao et al.	Cretaceous	Burmese amber	Myanmar	A hangingfly. The type species is B. jarzembowskii.	
Conicholcorpa	Gen. et sp. nov	Valid	Li et al.	Middle Jurassic (late Callovian)	Jiulongshan Formation	China	A member of the family Holcorpidae. The type species is C. stigmosa.	

=== Neuropterans ===
Name	Novelty	Status	Authors	Age	Unit	Location	Notes	Images
Arbusella magna	Sp. nov	Valid	Khramov, Liu & Zhang	Jurassic	Daohugou Beds	China	A member of the family Osmylidae belonging to the subfamily Kempyninae.	
Burmithone	Gen. et sp. nov	Valid	Lu et al.	Late Cretaceous (Cenomanian)	Burmese amber	Myanmar	A member of the family Ithonidae. Genus includes new species B. pennyi.	
Burmobabinskaia	Gen. et sp. nov	Valid	Lu, Zhang & Liu	Late Cretaceous (Cenomanian)	Burmese amber	Myanmar	A member of Myrmeleontoidea belonging to the family Babinskaiidae. The type species is B. tenuis.	
Burmodipteromantispa	Gen. et sp. nov	Valid	Liu, Lu & Zhang	Late Cretaceous (Cenomanian)	Burmese amber	Myanmar	A member of Dipteromantispidae. The type species is B. jiaxiaoae.	
Burmopsychops groehni	Sp. nov	Valid	Makarkin	Cretaceous (late Albian or early Cenomanian)	Burmese amber	Myanmar	A neuropteran of uncertain phylogenetic placement. Originally classified as member of the family Dilaridae and assigned to the genus Burmopsychops; subsequently transferred to the family Kalligrammatidae and to the genus Oligopsychopsis by Liu et al. (2018).	
Cretaconiopteryx	Gen. et sp. nov	Valid	Liu & Lu	Late Cretaceous (Cenomanian)	Burmese amber	Myanmar	A member of the family Coniopterygidae. The type species is C. grandis.	
Cretadilar	Gen. et sp. nov	Valid	Makarkin	Cretaceous (late Albian or early Cenomanian)	Burmese amber	Myanmar	A member of Dilaridae. The type species is C. olei.	
Cretarophalis	Gen. et sp. nov	Valid	Wichard	Cretaceous (Albian–Cenomanian)	Burmese amber	Myanmar	A member of the family Nevrorthidae. The type species is C. patrickmuelleri.	
Electrobabinskaia	Gen. et sp. nov	Valid	Lu, Zhang & Liu	Late Cretaceous (Cenomanian)	Burmese amber	Myanmar	A member of Myrmeleontoidea belonging to the family Babinskaiidae. The type species is E. burmana.	
Electropsychops	Gen. et sp. nov	Valid	Lu et al.	Late Cretaceous (Cenomanian)	Burmese amber	Myanmar	A member of the family Psychopsidae. Genus includes new species E. handlirschi.	
Epignopholeon	Gen. et sp. nov	Valid	Makarkin	Early Eocene	Green River Formation	United States	A probable Gnopholeontini tribe myrmeleontine antlion. The type species is E. sophiae.	
Epiosmylus longus	Sp. nov	Valid	Khramov	Middle Jurassic		Russia	A member of Osmylidae.	
Glaesoconis popovi	Sp. nov	Valid	Makarkin & Perkovsky	Late Cretaceous (Santonian)	Taimyr amber	Russia	A member of the family Coniopterygidae.	
Jersimantispa	Gen. et comb. nov	Valid	Liu, Lu & Zhang	Late Cretaceous (Turonian)	New Jersey amber	United States	A member of Dipteromantispidae; a new genus for "Mantispidiptera" henryi Grimaldi (2000).	
Kubekius	Gen. et sp. nov	Valid	Khramov	Middle Jurassic		Russia	A member of Osmylidae. Genus includes new species K. multiramosus.	
Lithochrysa borealis	Sp. nov	Valid	Archibald & Makarkin	Early Eocene; Ypersian	Eocene Okanagan Highlands; Driftwood shales	Canada	A Nothochrysinae green lacewing.	
Mantispidipterella	Gen. et sp. nov	Valid	Liu, Lu & Zhang	Late Cretaceous (Cenomanian)	Burmese amber	Myanmar	A member of Dipteromantispidae. The type species is M. longissima.	
Parababinskaia	Gen. et sp. nov	Valid	Makarkin, Heads & Wedmann	Early Cretaceous (late Aptian)	Crato Formation	Brazil	A member of Myrmeleontoidea belonging to the family Babinskaiidae. Genus includes new species P. elegans.	
Ponomarenkius	Gen. et sp. nov	Valid	Khramov, Liu & Zhang	Jurassic	Daohugou Beds	China	A member of the family Osmylidae belonging to the subfamily Kempyninae. Genus includes new species P. excellens.	
Pseudobabinskaia	Gen. et sp. nov	Valid	Makarkin, Heads & Wedmann	Late Cretaceous (Cenomanian)	Burmese amber	Myanmar	A member of Myrmeleontoidea belonging to the family Babinskaiidae. The type species is "Babinskaia" martinsnetoi Lu, Zhang & Liu (2017).	
Pseudosmylidia	Gen. et sp. nov	Valid	Makarkin	Late Eocene	Florissant Fossil Beds National Monument	United States	A member of Osmylidae. The type species is P. relicta.	
Xenoberotha	Gen. et sp. nov	Valid	Makarkin	Early Eocene	Green River Formation	United States; Colorado	A berothine beaded lacewing. The type species is X. angustialata.	

=== Odonatans ===
Name	Novelty	Status	Authors	Age	Unit	Location	Notes	Images
Angustaeshna	Gen. et sp. nov	Valid	Huang, Cai & Nel	Late Cretaceous (Cenomanian)	Burmese amber	Myanmar	A dragonfly belonging to the superfamily Aeshnoidea and the family Burmaeshnidae. The type species is A. magnifica.	
Burmachistigma	Gen. et sp. nov	Valid	Zheng et al.	Late Cretaceous (Cenomanian)	Burmese amber	Myanmar	A coenagrionoid damselfly. Genus includes new species B. cheni.	
Burmacoenagrion	Gen. et sp. nov	Valid	Zheng et al.	Late Cretaceous (Cenomanian)	Burmese amber	Myanmar	A coenagrionoid damselfly. Genus includes new species B. pretiosus.	
Burmaeshna	Gen. et sp. nov	Valid	Huang et al.	Late Cretaceous (Cenomanian)	Burmese amber	Myanmar	A dragonfly. The type species is B. azari.	
Burmagomphides	Gen. et sp. nov	Valid	Zheng, Nel & Wang in Zheng et al.	Late Cretaceous (Cenomanian)	Burmese amber	Myanmar	A dragonfly. Genus includes new species B. electronica.	
Burmagrion	Gen. et sp. nov	Valid	Möstel, Schorr & Bechly	Late Cretaceous (Cenomanian)	Burmese amber	Myanmar	A stem-coenagrionoid damselfly. The type species is B. marjanmatoki.	Burmagrion marijanmatoki
Burmahemiphlebia	Gen. et sp. nov	Valid	Zheng et al.	Late Cretaceous (Cenomanian)	Burmese amber	Myanmar	A damselfly belonging to the family Hemiphlebiidae. The type species is Burmahemiphlebia zhangi.	
Chlorocypha cordasevae	Sp. nov	Valid	Nel, Gross & Engel	Late Miocene	Styrian Basin	Austria	A species of Chlorocypha.	
Cretaeshna	Gen. et sp. nov	Valid	Zheng et al.	Late Cretaceous (Cenomanian)	Burmese amber	Myanmar	A dragonfly belonging to the superfamily Aeshnoidea. Originally assigned to the family Telephlebiidae, but subsequently transferred to the family Burmaeshnidae. The type species is C. lini.	
Electrocoenagrion	Gen. et 2 sp. nov	Valid	Zheng et al.	Late Cretaceous (Cenomanian)	Burmese amber	Myanmar	A coenagrionoid damselfly. Genus includes new species E. elongatum and E. forficatum.	
Electrodysagrion	Gen. et sp. nov	Valid	Zheng, Nel & Wang in Zheng et al.	Late Cretaceous (Cenomanian)	Burmese amber	Myanmar	A damselfly belonging to the family Dysagrionidae. Genus includes new species E. lini.	
Elektrogomphaeschna	Gen. et 2 sp. nov	Valid	Pinkert, Bechly & Nel	Eocene	Baltic amber	Europe (Baltic Sea coast)	A dragonfly belonging to the family Gomphaeschnidae. Genus includes new species E. peterthieli and E. annekeae.	
Gallodorsettia	Gen. et sp. nov	Valid	Nel & Weis	Early Jurassic (Toarcian)		Luxembourg	A member of the family Campterophlebiidae. The type species is G. kronzi.	
Gomphaeschna carinthiae	Sp. nov	Valid	Schädel & Lechner	Middle Miocene		Austria	A dragonfly.	
Ictinogomphus hassleri	Sp. nov	Valid	Schädel & Lechner	Middle Miocene		Austria	A dragonfly, a species of Ictinogomphus.	
Junfengi	Gen. et sp. nov	Valid	Zheng & Zhang in Zheng et al.	Middle Jurassic	Yanan Formation	China	A damsel-dragonfly belonging to the group Isophlebioidea and the family Campterophlebiidae. Genus includes new species J. yulinensis.	
Juraheterophlebia cancellosa	Sp. nov	Valid	Huang & Nel	Middle–Late Jurassic		China	A damsel-dragonfly belonging to the group Stenophlebioptera and the family Juraheterophlebiidae.	
Linqibinia	Gen. et sp. nov	Valid	Pinkert, Nel & Huang	Middle Jurassic	Haifanggou Formation	China	A dragonfly belonging to the family Paracymatophlebiidae. Genus includes new species L. panae.	
Mesomegaloprepus	Gen. et sp. nov	Valid	Huang et al.	Late Cretaceous (early Cenomanian)	Burmese amber	Myanmar	A damselfly. The type species is M. magnificus.	
Mesosticta davidattenboroughi	Sp. nov	Valid	Zheng et al.	Late Cretaceous (Cenomanian)	Burmese amber	Myanmar	A damselfly belonging to the family Platystictidae.	
Palaeodisparoneura cretacica	Sp. nov	Valid	Zheng, Wang & Chang	Late Cretaceous (Cenomanian)	Burmese amber	Myanmar	A damselfly belonging to the family Platycnemididae.	
Palaeodysagrion	Gen. et sp. nov	Valid	Zheng et al.	Late Cretaceous (Cenomanian)	Burmese amber	Myanmar	A damselfly belonging to the family Dysagrionidae. The type species is Palaeodysagrion cretacicus. The second species assigned to this genus, Palaeodysagrion youlini Zheng, Chang & Chang (2017), was subsequently transferred to the separate genus Pseudopalaeodysagrion.	
Propecymatophlebia	Gen. et sp. nov	Valid	Huang, Nel & Cai	Middle Jurassic	Haifanggou Formation	China	A dragonfly. The type species is P. magnifica.	
Reisia rieki	Sp. nov	Valid	Deregnaucourt et al.	Late Triassic (Carnian)	Molteno Formation	South Africa	A member of Triadotypomorpha belonging to the family Triadotypidae.	
Satelitala	Gen. et sp. nov	Valid	Petrulevičius	Eocene (Ypresian)		Argentina	A dragonfly belonging to the family Burmagomphidae. The type species is S. soberana.	
Treintamilun	Gen. et sp. nov	Valid	Petrulevičius	Eocene (Lutetian)		Argentina	A member of the family Frenguelliidae. The type species is T. vuelvenlucha.	
Yijenplatycnemis	Gen. et sp. nov		Zheng et al.	Late Cretaceous (Cenomanian)	Burmese amber	Myanmar	A damselfly belonging to the family Platycnemididae and the subfamily Palaeodisparoneurinae. The type species is Y. huangi.	Yijenplatycnemis huangi

=== Trichopterans ===
Name	Novelty	Status	Authors	Age	Unit	Location	Notes	Images
Acisarcuatus locellatus	Sp. nov	Valid	Zhang, Shih & Ren	Middle Jurassic	Jiulongshan Formation	China	A caddisfly belonging to the family Necrotauliidae; a species of Acisarcuatus.	
Archaeopolycentra yantardakh	Sp. nov	Valid	Ivanov & Melnitsky	Late Cretaceous (Santonian)	Kheta Formation	Russia	A caddisfly belonging to the family Polycentropodidae.	
Kamopanorpa tamarae	Sp. nov	Valid	Sukatsheva & Aristov	Early Permian		Russia	A member of the family Microptysmatidae.	
Kamopanorpa tyulkiana	Sp. nov	Valid	Sukatsheva & Aristov	Early Permian		Russia	A member of the family Microptysmatidae.	
Kliganigadukia	Gen. et sp. nov	Valid	Ivanov & Melnitsky	Late Cretaceous (Santonian)	Kheta Formation	Russia	A caddisfly belonging to the family Hydrobiosidae. Genus includes new species K. taymyrensis.	
Liadotaulius limus	Sp. nov	Valid	Zhang, Shih & Ren	Middle Jurassic	Jiulongshan Formation	China	Possibly a member of the family Philopotamidae; a species of Liadotaulius.	
Palaeopsilotreta	Gen. et sp. nov	Valid	Wichard & Wang	Late Cretaceous (Cenomanian)	Burmese amber	Myanmar	A caddisfly belonging to the family Odontoceridae. The type species is P. xiai.	
Prodicos	Gen. et sp. nov	Valid	Sukacheva	Late Eocene-early Oligocene		Russia	A caddisfly belonging to the family Limnephilidae. Genus includes new species P. rasnitsyni.	
Siberoclea	Gen. et sp. nov	Valid	Ivanov & Melnitsky	Late Cretaceous (Santonian)	Kheta Formation	Russia	A caddisfly belonging to the family Leptoceridae. Genus includes new species S. parapolaria.	
Taymyrodipseudon	Gen. et sp. nov	Valid	Ivanov & Melnitsky	Late Cretaceous (Santonian)	Kheta Formation	Russia	A caddisfly belonging to the family Dipseudopsidae. Genus includes new species T. protopegasus.	

=== Other insects ===
Name	Novelty	Status	Authors	Age	Unit	Location	Notes	Images
Aethiocarenus	Gen. et sp. nov	Valid	Poinar & Brown	Late Cretaceous (Cenomanian)	Burmese amber	Myanmar	An insect of uncertain phylogenetic placement. Originally interpreted as a wingless insect belonging to the new order Aethiocarenodea; Vršanský et al. (2018) considered it to be an alienopterid nymph. The type species is A. burmanicus.	Aethiocarenus burmanicus
Alexarasnia limbata	Sp. nov	Valid	Aristov	Late Permian (Severodvinian)	Poldarsk Formation	Russia	A member of Embioptera belonging to the family Alexarasniidae.	
Angaroptera	Gen. et sp. nov	Valid	Wachtler	Permian (Kungurian)		Russia	A member of Orthoptera resembling modern crickets. The type species is A. nicolaswachtleri.	
Arroyohymen	Gen. et sp. nov	Valid	Prokop & Kukalová-Peck	Permian (early Asselian)	Bursum Formation	United States	A member of the family Protohymenidae. The type species is A. splendens.	
Ashanga jiuquanensis	Sp. nov	Valid	Wang & Zhang in Wang et al.	Early Cretaceous (Albian)	Zhonggou Formation	China	A member of Orthoptera belonging to the family Prophalangopsidae and the subfamily Chifengiinae.	
Baikalogenites	Gen. et sp. nov	Valid	Sinitshenkova	Late Jurassic–Early Cretaceous		Russia	A mayfly belonging to the family Hexagenitidae. Genus includes new species B. firmus.	
Baissoptera bicolor	Sp. nov	Valid	Lyu, Ren & Liu	Early Cretaceous (Barremian)	Yixian Formation	China	A snakefly belonging to the family Baissopteridae.	
Baissoptera sinica	Sp. nov	Valid	Lyu, Ren & Liu	Early Cretaceous (Barremian)	Yixian Formation	China	A snakefly belonging to the family Baissopteridae.	
Bansheepteron	Gen. et sp. nov	Valid	Garrouste et al.	Permian (Guadalupian)		France	A member of Odonatoptera belonging to the group Protanisoptera. The type species is B. gonfaronensis.	
Belmomantis	Gen. et sp. nov	Valid	Prokop et al.	Permian (Lopingian)	Newcastle Coal Measures	Australia	A member of Miomoptera belonging to the family Palaeomanteidae. The type species is B. azari.	
Borinquena schawallfussi	Sp. nov	Valid	Staniczek, Godunko & Krzemiński	Miocene	Dominican amber	Dominican Republic	A mayfly belonging to the family Leptophlebiidae.	
Brodia jogginsensis	Sp. nov	Valid	Prokop et al.	Carboniferous (Pennsylvanian)	Joggins Formation	Canada	A member of Megasecoptera.	
Burmacompsocus coniugans	Sp. nov	Valid	Sroka & Nel	Late Cretaceous (Cenomanian)	Burmese amber	Myanmar	A member of Psocoptera belonging to the family Compsocidae.	
Carrizodiaphanoptera	Gen. et sp. nov	Valid	Prokop & Kukalová-Peck	Permian (early Asselian)	Bursum Formation	United States	A member of the family Diaphanopteridae. The type species is C. permiana.	
Carrizoneura	Gen. et sp. nov	Valid	Prokop & Kukalová-Peck	Permian (early Asselian)	Bursum Formation	United States	A member of the family Syntonopteridae. The type species is C. carpenteri.	
Chauliodites esperstedti	Sp. nov	Valid	Van Eldijk et al.	Middle Triassic (Anisian)		Germany		
Chresmoda chikuni	Sp. nov	Valid	Zhang & Ge in Zhang et al.	Cretaceous (Albian-Cenomanian boundary)	Burmese amber	Myanmar	A member of Chresmodidae (a family of insects of uncertain phylogenetic placement).	
Cretaceobrevibusantennis	Gen. et 2 sp. nov	Valid	Chen & Su	Late Cretaceous (Cenomanian)	Burmese amber	China	A member of Archaeognatha belonging to the family Meinertellidae. The type species is C. hookensis; genus also includes C. thornis.	
Elmomantis	Gen. et sp. nov	Valid	Prokop et al.	Early Permian	Wellington Formation	United States	A member of Miomoptera belonging to the family Palaeomanteidae. The type species is E. engeli.	
Eozaenhuepfer	Gen. et sp. nov	Valid	Zessin	Eocene (Ypresian)	Fur Formation	Denmark	A member of Orthoptera belonging to the family Eumastacidae. The type species is E. erteboellei.	
Eozaentetrix	Gen. et 2 sp. nov	Valid	Zessin	Eocene (Ypresian)	Fur Formation	Denmark	A member of Orthoptera belonging to the family Tetrigidae. The type species is E. wittecki; genus also includes E. furi.	
Ephemerella trigonoptera	Sp. nov	Valid	Staniczek, Godunko & Kluge	Eocene	Baltic amber	Europe (Baltic Sea coast)	A mayfly belonging to the family Ephemerellidae.	
Furvoneta khasurtensis	Sp. nov	Valid	Sinitshenkova	Late Jurassic–Early Cretaceous		Russia	A mayfly belonging to the family Mesonetidae.	
Gallogramma	Gen. et sp. nov	Valid	Garrouste et al.	Permian		France	A member of Panorthoptera belonging to the group Caloneurodea. The type species is G. galadrieli.	
Gigamachilis	Gen. et sp. nov	Valid	Montagna et al.	Middle Triassic	Monte San Giorgio site	Switzerland	A member of Archaeognatha belonging to the family Machilidae. The type species is G. triassicus.	
Kinitocelis	Gen. et 3 sp. nov	Valid	Mey et al.	Late Cretaceous (Cenomanian)	Burmese amber	Myanmar	An amphiesmenopteran in the new order Tarachoptera. The type species is K. hennigi; genus also includes K. divisonotata and K. brevicostata.	Kinitocelis brevicostata
Locustoblattina	Gen. et 2 sp. nov	Valid	Aristov	Middle Triassic	Madygen Formation	Kyrgyzstan	A member of Eoblattida belonging to the family Mesorthopteridae. The type species is L. marginata; genus also includes L. segmentata.	
Mazonopsocus	Gen. et sp. nov	Valid	Prokop et al.	Carboniferous (Moscovian)	Mazon Creek fossil beds	United States	A member of Miomoptera belonging to the family Palaeomanteidae. The type species is M. testai.	
Mesobaetis crispa	Sp. nov	Valid	Sinitshenkova	Late Jurassic–Early Cretaceous		Russia	A mayfly belonging to the family Siphlonuridae sensu lato.	
Microbaissoptera	Gen. et sp. et comb. nov	Valid	Lyu, Ren & Liu	Early Cretaceous	Baissa locality Yixian Formation	China; Russia	A snakefly belonging to the family Baissopteridae. Genus includes new species M. monosticha, as well as "Baissoptera" minima Ponomarenko (1993).	
Nestorembia shcherbakovi	Sp. nov	Valid	Aristov	Middle Triassic	Madygen Formation	Kyrgyzstan	A member of Embioptera belonging to the family Alexarasniidae.	
Ororaphidia bifurcata	Sp. nov	Valid	Lyu, Ren & Liu	Middle Jurassic	Jiulongshan Formation	China	A snakefly belonging to the family Mesoraphidiidae.	
Palaeomanicapsocus	Gen. et 2 sp. nov	Valid	Azar et al.	Late Cretaceous (Cenomanian)	Burmese amber	Myanmar	A member of Troctomorpha belonging to the group Amphientometae and the family Manicapsocidae. Genus includes new species P. margoae and P. fouadi.	
Palaeosiamoglaris	Gen. et 3 sp. nov	Valid	Azar, Huang & Nel in Azar et al.	Late Cretaceous (Cenomanian)	Burmese amber	Myanmar	A member of Psocodea belonging to the family Prionoglarididae. Genus includes new species P. leinhardi, P. burmica and P. inexpectata.	
Parakhosara kamica	Sp. nov	Valid	Sukatsheva & Aristov	Early Permian		Russia	A member of Eoblattida belonging to the family Megakhosaridae.	
Permoshurabia argentina	Sp. nov	Valid	Lara & Aristov	Late Triassic		Argentina	A member of the family Geinitziidae.	
Proameletus branchiatus	Sp. nov	Valid	Sinitshenkova	Late Jurassic–Early Cretaceous		Russia	A mayfly belonging to the family Siphlonuridae sensu lato.	
Proboscisthrips	Gen. et sp. nov	Valid	Ulitzka	Eocene	Baltic amber	Poland	A thrips belonging to the family Melanthripidae. The type species is P. mammuthoides.	
Pseudoperla leptoclada	Sp. nov	Valid	Chen et al.	Late Cretaceous (Cenomanian)	Burmese amber	Myanmar	A member of Phasmatodea belonging to the family Archipseudophasmatidae.	
Pseudoperla scapiforma	Sp. nov	Valid	Chen et al.	Late Cretaceous (Cenomanian)	Burmese amber	Myanmar	A member of Phasmatodea belonging to the family Archipseudophasmatidae.	
Sabatinca cretacea	Sp. nov	Valid	Zhang et al.	Late Cretaceous (Cenomanian)	Burmese amber	Myanmar	A moth belonging to the family Micropterigidae, a species of Sabatinca.	
Sabatinca limula	Sp. nov	Valid	Zhang et al.	Late Cretaceous (Cenomanian)	Burmese amber	Myanmar	A moth belonging to the family Micropterigidae, a species of Sabatinca.	
Sinogerarus	Gen. et sp. nov	Valid	Gu, Béthoux & Ren	Carboniferous (Namurian)	Tupo Formation	China	A member of Panorthoptera (the clade containing orthopterans and their closest fossil relatives). The type species is S. pectinatus.	
Sinotriadophlebia	Gen. et sp. nov		Zheng, Nel & Zhang in Zheng et al.	Late Triassic	Baijiantan Formation	China	A member of Odonatoptera belonging to the group Triadophlebiomorpha. The type species is S. lini.	
Tanyglossus	Gen. et sp. nov	Valid	Poinar	Late Cretaceous (Cenomanian)	Burmese amber	Myanmar	A moth; originally assigned to the family Douglasiidae, but this placement was subsequently contested. Genus includes new species T. orectometopus.	
Tarachocelis	Gen. et sp. nov	Valid	Mey et al.	Late Cretaceous (Cenomanian)	Burmese amber	Myanmar	An amphiesmenopteran in the new order Tarachoptera. The type species is T. microlepidopterella.	Tarachocelis microlepidopterella
Vitimoilus ovatus	Sp. nov	Valid	Gu et al.	Early Cretaceous	Dabeigou Formation; Yixian Formation	China	An ensiferan belonging to the family Haglidae and the subfamily Cyrtophyllitinae.	
Zygophlebia tongchuanensis	Sp. nov	Valid	Zheng et al.	Middle–Late Triassic (probably Ladinian)	Tongchuan Formation	China	A member of Odonatoptera belonging to the group Triadophlebioptera and the family Zygophlebiidae.	

== General research ==
- A study on the diversity of insect herbivory on fossil angiosperm leaves from the Miocene Hindon Maar fossil lagerstätte (Otago, New Zealand) is published by Möller et al. (2017).
- A study on the wing pad joints in several specimens of Carboniferous palaeodictyopteran insect nymphs, and their implications for the origin of insect wings, is published by Prokop et al. (2017).
- An exceptionally preserved specimen of the early mantis species Santanmantis axelrodi, providing new information on the morphology of members of the species, is described from the Lower Cretaceous Crato Formation (Brazil) by Hörnig, Haug & Haug (2017).
- A redescription of the Eocene thrips species "Heterothrips" dietrichi Schliephake (2003) is published by Ulitzka & Mound (2017), who transfer this species to the genus Merothrips.
- A planidium, tentatively attributed to the order Strepsiptera, is described from the Late Cretaceous (Santonian) amber recovered from the Kheta Formation (Taymyr Peninsula, Russia) by Kathirithamby et al. (2017).
- Several permineralised axes of the conifer wood Ningxiaites specialis with preserved beetle borings and beetle remains are described from the Permian (Changhsingian) Sunjiagou Formation (China) by Feng et al. (2017).
- Peris et al. (2017) describe gymnosperm pollen preserved with a specimen of the false blister beetle species Darwinylus marcosi from the Cretaceous amber from Spain, and interpret the finding as indicating that false blister beetles originally were pollinators of gymnosperms (most likely cycads) before transitioning onto angiosperm hosts.
- Diverse fungivorous rove beetles belonging to the subfamily Oxyporinae are described from the Cretaceous Burmese amber by Cai et al. (2017).
- A redescription of the cryptophagid genus Nganasania from the Cretaceous Taimyr amber (Russia) is published by Lyubarsky & Perkovsky (2017).
- A study on the anatomy of the tracheal system of Saurophthirus longipes and its implications for the life cycle of the species is published by Rasnitsyn & Strelnikova (2017).
- A restudy of the fossils of the Triassic (Norian) species Archebittacus exilis is published by Lambkin (2017), who confirms that this taxon is an early hangingfly.
- New specimens of the mecopteran species Burmomerope clara (a male and a well-preserved female), providing new information on the anatomy of the species, are described from the Cretaceous Burmese amber by Soszyńska-Maj et al. (2017).
- A rhopalosomatid larva attached to a cricket is described from the Cretaceous Burmese amber (Myanmar) by Lohrmann & Engel (2017).
- A study on the phylogenetic relationships of the fossil ant Leptomyrmex neotropicus is published by Barden, Boudinot & Lucky (2017).
- Four pupae of assassin flies (likely representatives of the subfamily Laphriinae) are described from a single piece of amber (most likely of Baltic origin) by Haug et al. (2017).
- A study on the caddisfly cases from the Cretaceous (Berriasian-Hauterivian) Shinekhudag Formation (Mongolia) is published by Adiya et al. (2017), who find evidence that the Cretaceous caddisflies used, among other things, plant fragments, ostracod valves and carbonate rocks to construct larval cases, and argue that the bioherms of the Shinekhudag Formation developed as a result of symbiosis of caddisfly larvae and microbialites.
- A female of the alderfly species Haplosialodes liui is described for the first time from the Cretaceous Burmese amber by Liu et al. (2017).
- A review of the fossil record and early evolution of five groups of brachyceran flies, discussing their probable ecological associations with early flowering plants, is published by Zhang & Wang (2017).
