= Quasi =

Quasi may refer to:

- Quasi (band), American indie rock band
- Quasi (film), 2023 American film
- Quasi, a musical term meaning "almost"
- Quasi (fly), a genus of insect
- Quasi (sculpture), an artwork in Wellington, New Zealand
- "Quasi", by Logic from Vinyl Days (2022)
- Quasi-Sport like to Hobby horsing

== See also ==
- Graman Quassi (1692–1787), Surinamese healer and botanist
