= Smicrips texana =

Scientific classification
- Kingdom: Animalia
- Phylum: Arthropoda
- Class: Insecta
- Order: Coleoptera
- Suborder: Polyphaga
- Infraorder: Cucujiformia
- Family: Smicripidae
- Genus: Smicrips
- Species: S. texana

Binomial name
- Smicrips texana (Casey, 1916)

Species of beetle

Smicrips texana is a species of palmetto beetle in the family Smicripidae. It is found in North America.
