= Metadrosus =

Scientific classification
- Kingdom: Animalia
- Phylum: Arthropoda
- Class: Insecta
- Order: Coleoptera
- Suborder: Polyphaga
- Infraorder: Cucujiformia
- Family: Curculionidae
- Tribe: Polydrusini
- Genus: Metadrosus; Schilsky, 1910

Species
- Several, including: Metadrosus bellus Kraatz, 1859

Genus of beetles

Metadrosus is a genus of true weevils (insects in the family Curculionidae). Species are found in Southern Europe (Greece, Italy).
