= Neophilopota =

Scientific classification
- Domain: Eukaryota
- Kingdom: Animalia
- Phylum: Arthropoda
- Class: Insecta
- Order: Diptera
- Family: Acroceridae
- Subfamily: Philopotinae
- Genus: Neophilopota; Schlinger in Schlinger, Gillung & Borkent, 2013
- Species: N. brevirostris

Binomial name
- Neophilopota brevirostris Schlinger in Schlinger, Gillung & Borkent, 2013

Genus of flies

Neophilopota is a genus of small-headed flies. It contains only a single species, Neophilopota brevirostris, described by Schlinger in 2013. It is endemic to Mexico.

The generic name is a combination of the Latin prefix neo ("new") and Philopota, the name of a genus that Neophilopota resembles. The specific name is said to be derived from the Latin brevis ("short") and rostris ("beak"), referring to the short length of the proboscis in comparison to species of Philopota. The proper word for "beak" in Latin is however rostrum.
