= Dungeyella =

Dungeyella Temporal range: Barremian, 125 Ma
- Holotype specimen of Dungeyella in amber

Scientific classification
- Domain: Eukaryota
- Kingdom: Animalia
- Phylum: Arthropoda
- Class: Insecta
- Order: Diptera
- Family: Chironomidae
- Subfamily: Buchonomyiinae
- Genus: †Dungeyella
- Species: †D. gavini

Binomial name
- †Dungeyella gavini Jarzembowski, et al. 2009

Extinct genus of flies

Dungeyella is an extinct genus of chironomid midge from the Wealden amber of the Wessex Formation of the Isle of Wight, UK, containing the single species D. gavini. it belongs to the subfamily Buchonomyiinae.
