= Dryophthorus distinguendus =

Conservation status
- Extinct (IUCN 3.1)

Scientific classification
- Kingdom: Animalia
- Phylum: Arthropoda
- Class: Insecta
- Order: Coleoptera
- Suborder: Polyphaga
- Infraorder: Cucujiformia
- Family: Curculionidae
- Genus: Dryophthorus
- Species: †D. distinguendus

Binomial name
- †Dryophthorus distinguendus Perkins, 1900

Extinct species of beetle

Dryophthorus distinguendus was a species of beetle in family Curculionidae. It was endemic to the Hawaiian Islands.
