= Dryophthorus americanus =

Scientific classification
- Domain: Eukaryota
- Kingdom: Animalia
- Phylum: Arthropoda
- Class: Insecta
- Order: Coleoptera
- Suborder: Polyphaga
- Infraorder: Cucujiformia
- Family: Curculionidae
- Genus: Dryophthorus
- Species: D. americanus

Binomial name
- Dryophthorus americanus Bedel, 1885

Species of beetle

Dryophthorus americanus is a species of beetle in the family Dryophthoridae. It is found in North America.
