= Archaeterphis =

Archaeterphis Temporal range: Eocene

Scientific classification
- Kingdom: Animalia
- Phylum: Arthropoda
- Class: Insecta
- Order: Diptera
- Family: Acroceridae
- Subfamily: Philopotinae
- Genus: †Archaeterphis; Hauser & Winterton, 2007
- Species: †A. hennigi

Binomial name
- †Archaeterphis hennigi Hauser & Winterton, 2007

Extinct genus of flies

Archaeterphis is an extinct genus of small-headed flies in the family Acroceridae. It is known from Baltic amber from the Eocene, though the locality is unknown (possibly Russia). It contains only one species, Archaeterphis hennigi.

The generic name is a combination of the Greek word Arche (beginning) and Terphis, referring to the possible close relationship of Archaeterphis with the extant genera Africaterphis and Terphis. The species is named in honor of Willi Hennig.
