= Eulonchiella =

Eulonchiella Temporal range: Eocene

Scientific classification
- Kingdom: Animalia
- Phylum: Arthropoda
- Class: Insecta
- Order: Diptera
- Family: Acroceridae
- Subfamily: Philopotinae
- Genus: †Eulonchiella; Meunier, 1912
- Species: †E. eocenica

Binomial name
- †Eulonchiella eocenica Meunier, 1912

Extinct genus of flies

Eulonchiella is an extinct genus of small-headed flies in the family Acroceridae. It is known from Baltic amber from the Eocene, though the locality is unknown (possibly Russia). It contains only one species, Eulonchiella eocenica.
