= Metadrosus bellus =

Scientific classification
- Kingdom: Animalia
- Phylum: Arthropoda
- Class: Insecta
- Order: Coleoptera
- Suborder: Polyphaga
- Infraorder: Cucujiformia
- Family: Curculionidae
- Genus: Metadrosus
- Species: M. bellus

Binomial name
- Metadrosus bellus (Kraatz, 1859)

Subspecies
- Metadrosus bellus bellus (Kraatz, 1859); Metadrosus bellus convexifrons (Desbrochers, 1871)

Synonyms
- Chaerodrys elegans Faust, 1890; Foucartia bellus Kraatz, 1859; Polydrosus capito Weise, 1891

Species of beetle

Metadrosus bellus is a species of true weevils (insects in the family Curculionidae). It is found in Southern Europe.
