= Ischalia californica =

Scientific classification
- Domain: Eukaryota
- Kingdom: Animalia
- Phylum: Arthropoda
- Class: Insecta
- Order: Coleoptera
- Suborder: Polyphaga
- Infraorder: Cucujiformia
- Family: Ischaliidae
- Genus: Ischalia
- Species: I. californica

Binomial name
- Ischalia californica Van Dyke, 1938

Species of beetle

Ischalia californica is a species of broad-hipped flower beetle in the family Scraptiidae. It is found in North America.
