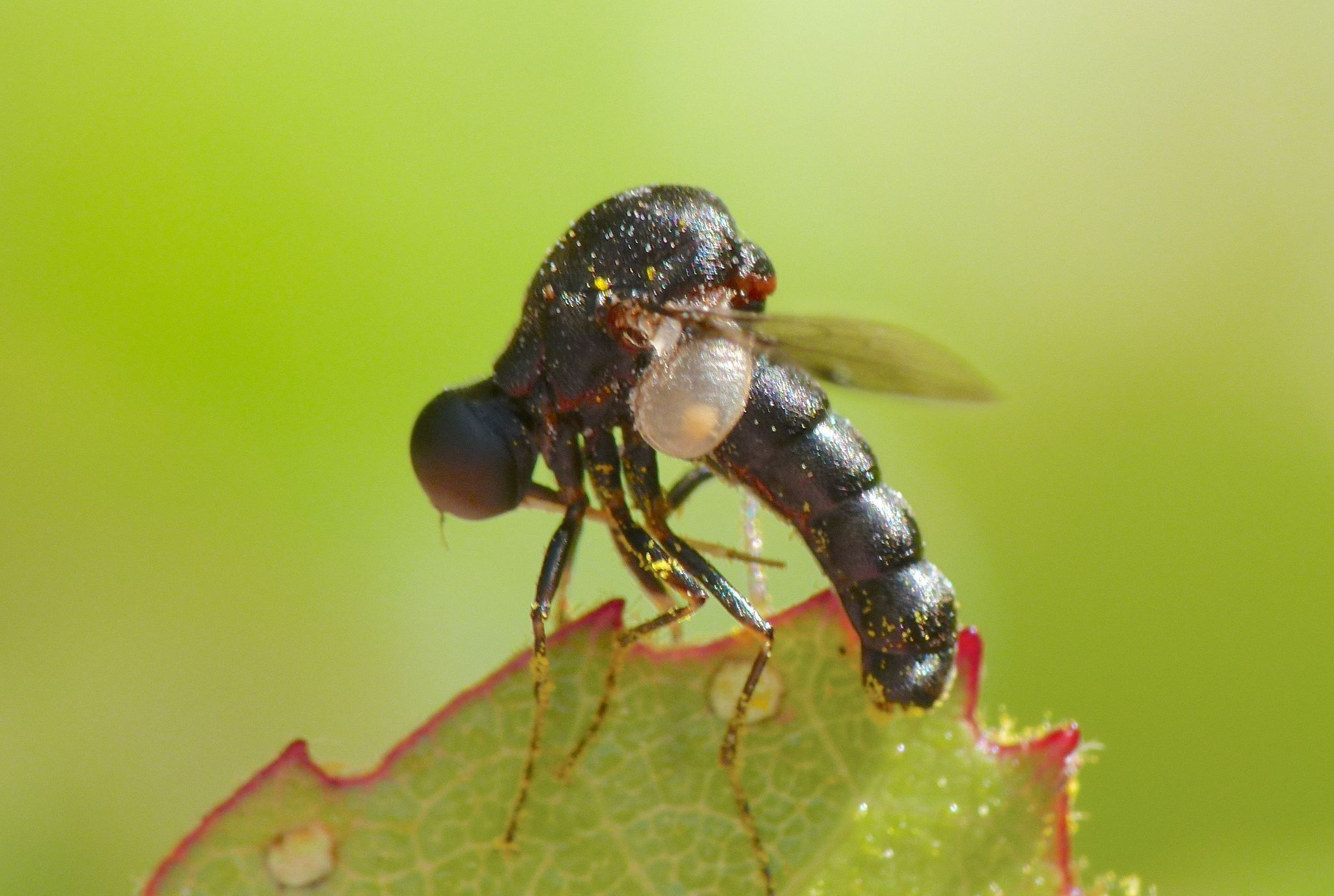
- Helle longirostris

Scientific classification
- Kingdom: Animalia
- Phylum: Arthropoda
- Class: Insecta
- Order: Diptera
- Family: Acroceridae
- Subfamily: Philopotinae
- Genus: Helle; Osten Sacken, 1896

Type species
- Acrocera longirostris Hudson, 1892

= Helle (fly) =

Genus of flies

Helle is a genus of small-headed flies. It is endemic to New Zealand. The genus is named after Helle, the daughter of Athamas, from Greek mythology.

== Species ==
- Helle longirostris (Hudson, 1892)
- Helle rufescens Brunetti, 1926
