= Schlingeriella =

Scientific classification
- Domain: Eukaryota
- Kingdom: Animalia
- Phylum: Arthropoda
- Class: Insecta
- Order: Diptera
- Family: Acroceridae
- Subfamily: Philopotinae
- Genus: Schlingeriella; Gillung & Winterton, 2011
- Species: S. irwini

Binomial name
- Schlingeriella irwini Gillung & Winterton, 2011

Genus of flies

Schlingeriella is a genus of small-headed flies (insects in the family Acroceridae). It contains only one species, Schlingeriella irwini, endemic to New Caledonia.

The genus is named in honor of Evert I. Schlinger, who collected specimens of the species and was also an expert on Acroceridae. The species is named in honor of the entomologist Michael E. Irwin.
