= Megalybus =

Scientific classification
- Kingdom: Animalia
- Phylum: Arthropoda
- Clade: Pancrustacea
- Class: Insecta
- Order: Diptera
- Family: Acroceridae
- Subfamily: Philopotinae
- Genus: Megalybus; Philippi, 1865

Type species
- Megalybus pictus Philippi, 1865

Synonyms
- Megalybus Westwood, 1876

Genus of flies

Megalybus is a genus of small-headed flies in the family Acroceridae. It contains three species found in Chile, though two species have also been reported from Neuquén Province of Argentina.

== Species ==
- Megalybus crassus Philippi, 1865
- Megalybus obesus Philippi, 1865
- Megalybus pictus Philippi, 1865
