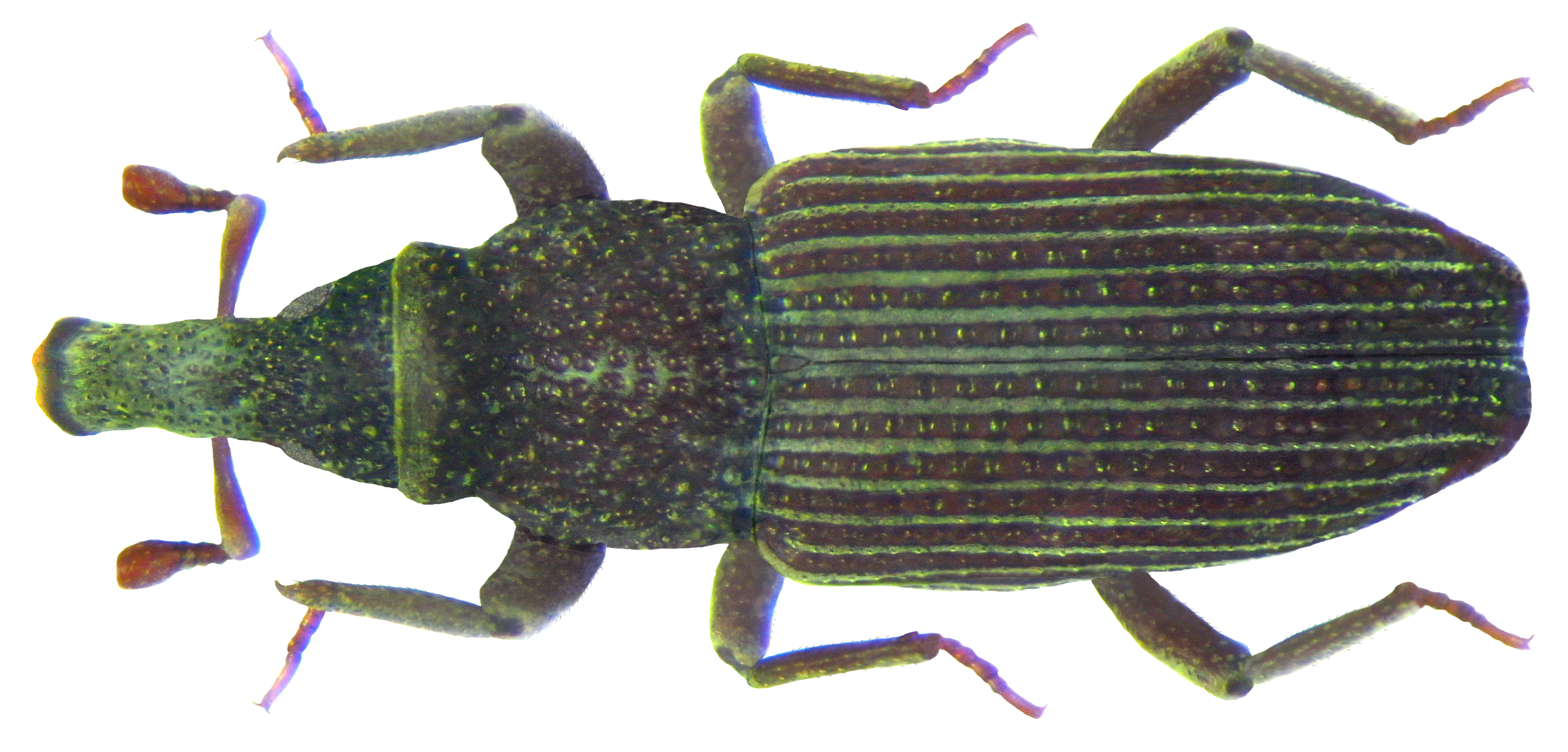
- Dryophthorus corticalis

Scientific classification
- Domain: Eukaryota
- Kingdom: Animalia
- Phylum: Arthropoda
- Class: Insecta
- Order: Coleoptera
- Suborder: Polyphaga
- Infraorder: Cucujiformia
- Family: Curculionidae
- Subfamily: Dryophthorinae
- Tribe: Dryophthorini
- Genus: Dryophthorus; Germar, 1824

= Dryophthorus =

Genus of beetles

Dryophthorus is a genus of true weevils in the family of beetles known as Curculionidae. There are at least 60 described species in Dryophthorus.

== Species ==
These 63 species belong to the genus Dryophthorus:

- Dryophthorus acarophilus Davis & Engel, 2006^{c}
- Dryophthorus alluaudi Hustache, 1922^{c}
- Dryophthorus americanus Bedel, 1885^{i c b}
- Dryophthorus armaticollis Marshall, 1931^{c}
- Dryophthorus assimilis Gahan, C.J., 1900^{c}
- Dryophthorus atomus Fairmaire, L., 1893^{c}
- Dryophthorus auriculatus Richard, 1957^{c}
- Dryophthorus bituberculatus Schoenherr, 1838^{c}
- Dryophthorus boettcheri Voss, 1940^{c}
- Dryophthorus brevipennis Perkins, 1900^{i c}
- Dryophthorus brevis Voss, 1934^{c}
- Dryophthorus cocosensis Champion, G.C., 1909^{c}
- Dryophthorus consimilis Voss, 1963^{c}
- Dryophthorus corticalis Say, 1831^{c g}
- Dryophthorus crassus Sharp, 1878^{i c}
- Dryophthorus crenatus Boisduval, 1835^{c}
- Dryophthorus curtus Hustache, 1933^{c}
- Dryophthorus declivis Sharp, 1878^{i c}
- Dryophthorus dissimilis Voss, 1940^{c}
- †Dryophthorus distinguendus Perkins, 1900^{c}
- Dryophthorus ecarinatus Champion, 1914^{c}
- Dryophthorus excavatus Boheman, 1838^{c}
- Dryophthorus explanipennis Richard, 1957^{c}
- Dryophthorus forestieri Perroud, B.P., 1864^{c}
- Dryophthorus fuscescens Perkins, 1900^{c}
- Dryophthorus gravidus Sharp, 1878^{i c}
- Dryophthorus guadelupensis Hustache, 1932^{c}
- Dryophthorus homoeorhynchus Perkins, 1900^{i c}
- Dryophthorus indicus Voss, 1940^{c}
- Dryophthorus insignis Sharp, 1878^{i c}
- Dryophthorus insignoides Perkins, 1900^{i c}
- Dryophthorus japonicus Konishi, 1963^{c}
- Dryophthorus kalshoveni Voss, 1963^{c}
- Dryophthorus kaszabi Hoffmann, 1968^{c}
- Dryophthorus kauaiensis Perkins, 1900^{i c}
- Dryophthorus laticauda Fairmaire, L., 1901^{c}
- Dryophthorus lymexylon Germar, 1824^{c}
- Dryophthorus modestus Sharp, 1878^{i c}
- Dryophthorus muscosus Marshall, 1931^{c}
- Dryophthorus nanus Hustache, 1932^{c}
- Dryophthorus nesiotes Perkins, 1900^{i c}
- Dryophthorus oahuensis Perkins, 1900^{i c}
- Dryophthorus ocularis Konishi, 1963^{c}
- Dryophthorus peles Perkins, 1900^{i c}
- Dryophthorus perahuae Zimmerman, 1968^{c}
- Dryophthorus persimilis Voss, 1940^{c}
- Dryophthorus pusillus Sharp, 1878^{i c}
- Dryophthorus quadricollis Champion, G.C., 1909^{c}
- Dryophthorus rapaae Zimmerman, 1968^{c}
- Dryophthorus rugulosus Richard, 1957^{c}
- Dryophthorus sculpturatus Konishi, 1963^{c}
- Dryophthorus setulosus Motschulsky, V. de, 1866^{c}
- Dryophthorus squalidus Sharp, 1878^{i c}
- Dryophthorus subtruncatus Voss, 1940^{c}
- Dryophthorus superbus Zherikhin, 2000^{c}
- Dryophthorus trichocerus Montrouzier, X., 1860^{c}
- Dryophthorus tricuspis Faust, J., 1899^{c}
- Dryophthorus verticalis Perkins, 1900^{i c}
- Dryophthorus viettei Richard, 1957^{c}
- Dryophthorus zuluanus Voss, 1974^{c}

Data sources: i = ITIS, c = Catalogue of Life, g = GBIF, b = Bugguide.net
