= Chaerodrys =

Scientific classification
- Kingdom: Animalia
- Phylum: Arthropoda
- Class: Insecta
- Order: Coleoptera
- Suborder: Polyphaga
- Infraorder: Cucujiformia
- Family: Brachyceridae
- Subfamily: Brachycerinae
- Genus: Chaerodrys; J. Du Val, 1854

Species
- Chaerodrys bellus Faust, 1890; Chaerodrys manteroi Solari, 1903; Chaerodrys schwiegeri Reitt., 1908; Chaerodrys setifrons Jacq. Du. Val, 1852; Chaerodrys tonsus Desbr., 1897; Chaerodrys viridis Stierl., 1897

Genus of beetles

Chaerodrys is a genus of obese weevils (insects in the family Brachyceridae).

Names brought to synonymy

- Chaerodrys elegans Faust, 1890, a synonym for Metadrosus bellus
