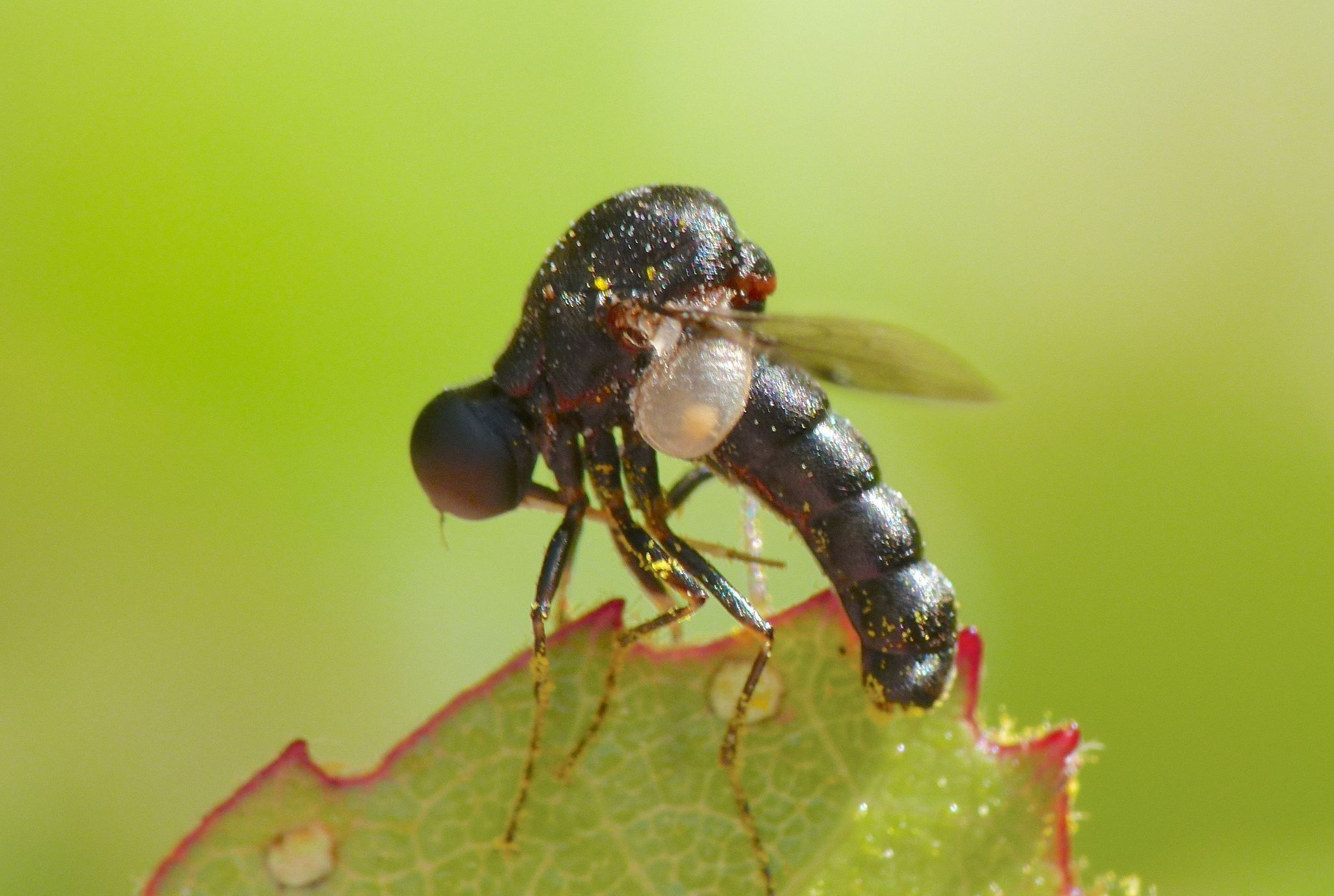
- Helle longirostris

Scientific classification
- Kingdom: Animalia
- Phylum: Arthropoda
- Class: Insecta
- Order: Diptera
- Family: Acroceridae
- Subfamily: Philopotinae; Schiner, 1867

Genera
- See text

= Philopotinae =

Subfamily of flies

Philopotinae is a subfamily of small-headed flies. They have an arched body shape, as well as enlarged postpronotal lobes that form a collar behind the head. Their larvae are endoparasites of araneomorph spiders in the subgroup Entelegynae.

== Genera ==
The subfamily includes twelve extant genera and four extinct:

- Africaterphis Schlinger, 1968
- †Archaeterphis Hauser & Winterton, 2007
- †Burmophilopota Feng et al., 2024
- Dimacrocolus Schlinger, 1961
- †Eulonchiella Meunier, 1912
- Helle Osten Sacken, 1896
- †Hoffeinsomyia Gillung & Winterton, 2017
- Megalybus Philippi, 1865
- Neophilopota Schlinger in Schlinger, Gillung & Borkent, 2013
- Oligoneura Bigot, 1878
- Parahelle Schlinger, 1961
- Philopota Wiedemann, 1830
- †Prophilopota Hennig, 1966
- Quasi Gillung & Winterton, 2011
- Schlingeriella Gillung & Winterton, 2011
- Terphis Erichson, 1840
- Thyllis Erichson, 1840
