= Smicrips =

Scientific classification
- Kingdom: Animalia
- Phylum: Arthropoda
- Class: Insecta
- Order: Coleoptera
- Suborder: Polyphaga
- Infraorder: Cucujiformia
- Family: Smicripidae
- Genus: Smicrips

Genus of beetles

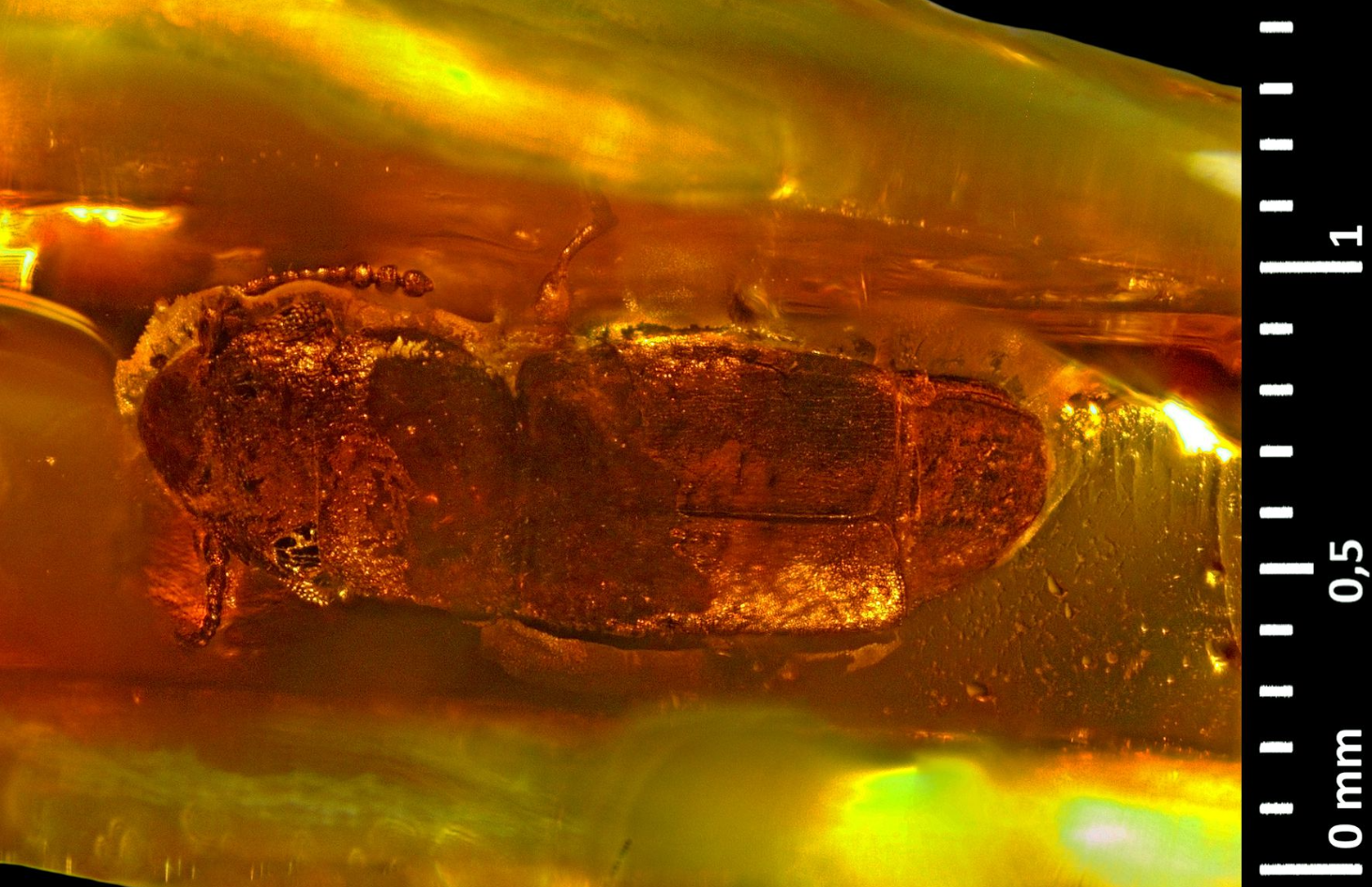

Smicrips is a genus of palmetto beetles in the family Smicripidae. There are at least 2 described species in Smicrips.

== Species ==
- Smicrips palmicola LeConte, 1878
- Smicrips texana (Casey, 1916)
