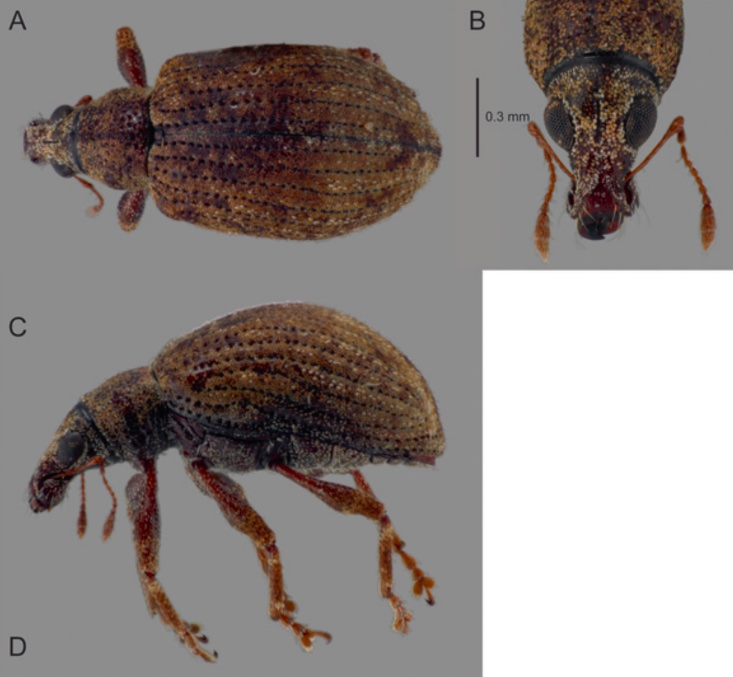
- Dorsal, lateral and head views of Apodrosus wolcotti.

Scientific classification
- Domain: Eukaryota
- Kingdom: Animalia
- Phylum: Arthropoda
- Class: Insecta
- Order: Coleoptera
- Suborder: Polyphaga
- Infraorder: Cucujiformia
- Family: Curculionidae
- Subfamily: Entiminae
- Tribe: Polydrusini
- Genus: Apodrosus

Type species
- Apodrosus wolcotti Marshall, 1922

= Apodrosus =

Insect genus

Apodrosus is a Caribbean genus of broad-nosed weevils in the subfamily Entiminae, tribe Polydrusini.

== Taxonomy ==
The genus Apodrosus was described for the first time by Sir Guy A. K. Marshall in 1922 (p. 59).

The type species of the genus is Apodrosus wolcotti, from Puerto Rico.

== Description ==
Small weevils (3–7 mm) of variable coloration ranging from grey to metallic green. They bear a large, triangular, glabrous nasal plate at the apical region of the rostrum.

== Distribution ==
Apodrosus is distributed across the West Indies with representatives in The Bahamas, Cuba, Hispaniola (the Dominican Republic and Haiti), Puerto Rico, and the Turks and Caicos Islands.

== List of species ==
The genus Apodrosus contains 22 described species:

1. Apodrosus adustus Girón & Franz, 2010: 393 (The Bahamas)
2. Apodrosus alberti Anderson, 2017: 80 (Cuba)
3. Apodrosus alternatum Anderson, 2017: 83 (Cuba)
4. Apodrosus andersoni Girón & Franz, 2010: 356 (Dominican Republic)
5. Apodrosus argentatus Wolcott, 1924: 130 (Dominican Republic, Puerto Rico)
6. Apodrosus artus Girón & Franz, 2010: 353 (Dominican Republic)
7. Apodrosus beckeli Anderson, 2017: 85 (Cuba)
8. Apodrosus earinusparsus Girón & Franz, 2010: 359 (Haiti)
9. Apodrosus empherefasciatus Girón & Franz, 2010: 395 (The Bahamas)
10. Apodrosus epipolevatus Girón & Franz, 2010: 362 (Puerto Rico)
11. Apodrosus eximius Girón & Franz, 2010: 370 (Dominican Republic)
12. Apodrosus franklyni Anderson, 2017: 87 (Cuba)
13. Apodrosus griseus Anderson, 2017: 90 (Cuba)
14. Apodrosus mammuthus Girón & Franz, 2010: 379 (Mona Island; Turks and Caicos Islands)
15. Apodrosus mensurensis Anderson, 2017: 92 (Cuba)
16. Apodrosus pseudoalternatus Anderson, 2017: 94 (Cuba)
17. Apodrosus quisqueyanus Girón & Franz, 2010: 389 (Dominican Republic)
18. Apodrosus sandersoni Anderson, 2017: 96 (Cuba)
19. Apodrosus stenoculus Girón & Franz, 2010: 385 (Dominican Republic)
20. Apodrosus viridium Girón & Franz, 2010: 381 (Dominican Republic)
21. Apodrosus wolcotti Marshall, 1922: 59 (Puerto Rico)
22. Apodrosus zayasi Anderson, 2017: 98 (Cuba)
