= Quasi fisheri =

Scientific classification
- Kingdom: Animalia
- Phylum: Arthropoda
- Class: Insecta
- Order: Diptera
- Family: Acroceridae
- Subfamily: Philopotinae
- Genus: Quasi; Gillung & Winterton, 2011
- Species: Q. fisheri

Binomial name
- Quasi fisheri Gillung & Winterton, 2011

Genus of flies

Quasi is a genus of small-headed flies in the family Acroceridae. It contains only one species, Quasi fisheri, known only from Veracruz, Mexico.

The generic name is from the Latin word quasi, referring to the likeness of the species to members of Terphis, a closely related genus. The species is named in honor of Eric Fisher, the collector of the only known specimen of the species.
