= Prophilopota =

Prophilopota Temporal range: Eocene

Scientific classification
- Kingdom: Animalia
- Phylum: Arthropoda
- Clade: Pancrustacea
- Class: Insecta
- Order: Diptera
- Family: Acroceridae
- Subfamily: Philopotinae
- Genus: †Prophilopota; Hennig, 1966

Type species
- †Prophilopota succinea Hennig, 1966

Species
- †P. succinea; †P. variegata

Extinct genus of flies

Prophilopota is an extinct genus of small-headed flies in the family Acroceridae. It is known from Baltic amber from the Eocene.

== Species ==
The genus contains two species:

- †Prophilopota succinea Hennig, 1966 – unknown locality (possibly Denmark)
- †Prophilopota variegata Gillung & Winterton, 2017 – Kaliningrad Oblast, Russia
