= Szelegiewicziidae =

Szelegiewicziidae Temporal range: Bajocian–Turonian

Scientific classification
- Domain: Eukaryota
- Kingdom: Animalia
- Phylum: Arthropoda
- Class: Insecta
- Order: Hemiptera
- Suborder: Sternorrhyncha
- Infraorder: Aphidomorpha
- Superfamily: †Palaeoaphidoidea
- Family: †Szelegiewicziidae; Wegierek, 1989

Extinct family of true bugs

Szelegiewicziidae is an extinct family of aphids in the order Hemiptera. There are about 6 genera and 10 described species in Szelegiewicziidae.

== Genera ==
These six genera belong to the family Szelegiewicziidae:

- † Brimaphis Wegierek, 1989 Dzun-Bain Formation, Mongolia, Aptian, Zaza Formation, Russia, Aptian
- † Feroorbis Wegierek & Huang, 2017 Burmese amber, Myanmar, Cenomanian
- † Sepiaphis Wegierek, 1989 Dzun-Bain Formation, Mongolia, Aptian
- † Szelegiewiczia Shaposhnikov, 1985 Zaza Formation, Russia, Aptian
- † Tinaphis Wegierek, 1989 Itat Formation, Russia, Bajocian/Bathonian, Sharteg, Mongolia, Tithonian, Zaza Formation, Russia, Aptian
- † Xenoaphis Wegierek, 1989 Zaza Formation, Russia, Aptian
