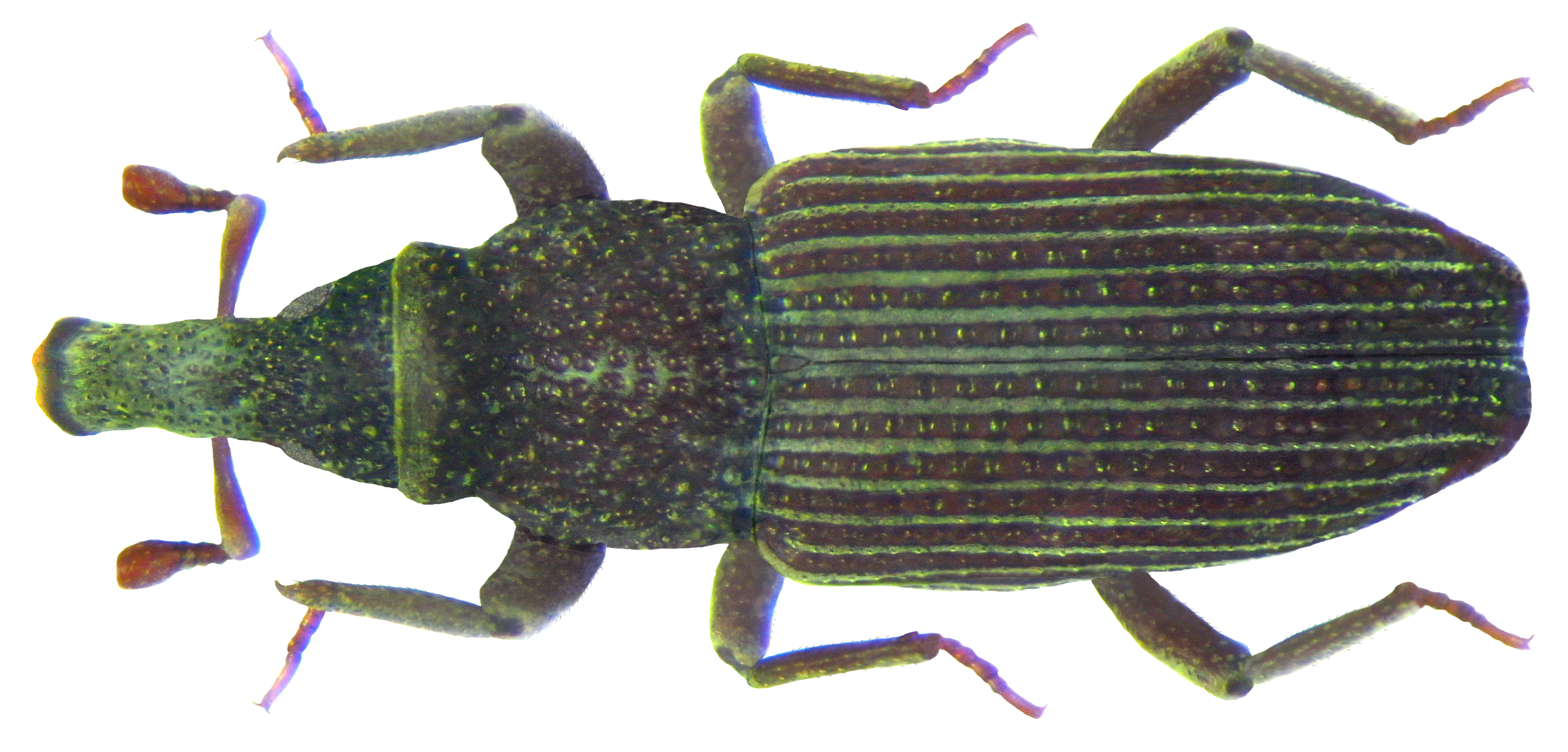
- Dryophthorus corticalis

Scientific classification
- Domain: Eukaryota
- Kingdom: Animalia
- Phylum: Arthropoda
- Class: Insecta
- Order: Coleoptera
- Suborder: Polyphaga
- Infraorder: Cucujiformia
- Family: Curculionidae
- Subfamily: Dryophthorinae
- Tribe: Dryophthorini; Schoenherr, 1825

= Dryophthorini =

Tribe of beetles

Dryophthorini is a tribe of weevils from the subfamily Dryophthorinae.

== Genera ==
Wikispecies lists the following confirmed genera:

- Dryophthorus
- Psilodryophthorus
- Stenommatus
- †Lithophthorus
