= Buchonomyia =

Scientific classification
- Kingdom: Animalia
- Phylum: Arthropoda
- Clade: Pancrustacea
- Class: Insecta
- Order: Diptera
- Family: Chironomidae
- Subfamily: Buchonomyiinae; Brundin & Sæther, 1978
- Genus: Buchonomyia; Fittkau, 1955

Type species
- B. thienemanni Fittkau, 1955

Species
- 3, see text

Genus of insects

Buchonomyia is the only extant genus of the subfamily Buchonomyiinae of the non-biting midge family Chironomidae. There are three known extant species and one fossil species in the genus: Members of the genus are parasitic of psychomyiid caddisflies.

- Buchonomyia thienemanni Fittkau, 1955
- Buchonomyia burmanica Brundin and Sæther, 1978
- Buchonomyia brundini Andersen and Sæther, 1995
- †Buchonomyia succinea Seredszus and Wichard 2003 (Eocene, Baltic amber)

In addition, two extinct genera belonging to Buchonomyiinae are known:

- †Dungeyella Jarzembowski et al. 2008 (Barremian, Wessex Formation)
- †Furcobuchonomyia Baranov et al. 2017 (Cenomanian, Burmese amber)
