= Ischalia =

Scientific classification
- Kingdom: Animalia
- Phylum: Arthropoda
- Clade: Pancrustacea
- Class: Insecta
- Order: Coleoptera
- Suborder: Polyphaga
- Infraorder: Cucujiformia
- Family: Ischaliidae
- Subfamily: Ischaliinae
- Genus: Ischalia; Pascoe, 1860

Genus of beetles

Ischalia is a genus of broad-hipped flower beetles in the family Ischaliidae as the only genus.

In some schemes they are treated in the subfamily Ischaliinae, in the wider Tenebrionoidea. There are at least 3 described species of Ischalia in the United States.

== Selected Species ==
- Ischalia barclayi Young, 2011
- Ischalia californica Van Dyke, 1938
- Ischalia costata (LeConte, 1861)
- Ischalia indigacea Pascoe, 1860
- Ischalia vancouverensis Harrington, 1892
