= Hoffeinsomyia =

Hoffeinsomyia Temporal range: Eocene

Scientific classification
- Kingdom: Animalia
- Phylum: Arthropoda
- Class: Insecta
- Order: Diptera
- Family: Acroceridae
- Subfamily: Philopotinae
- Genus: †Hoffeinsomyia; Gillung & Winterton, 2017
- Species: †H. leptogaster

Binomial name
- †Hoffeinsomyia leptogaster Gillung & Winterton, 2017

Extinct genus of flies

Hoffeinsomyia is an extinct genus of small-headed flies in the family Acroceridae. It is known from Baltic amber from the Eocene of Kaliningrad Oblast, Russia. It contains only one species, Hoffeinsomyia leptogaster.

The genus is named in honor of Christel and Hans Werner Hoffeins. The specific name is a combination of the Greek words lepto (slender) and gaster (abdomen).
