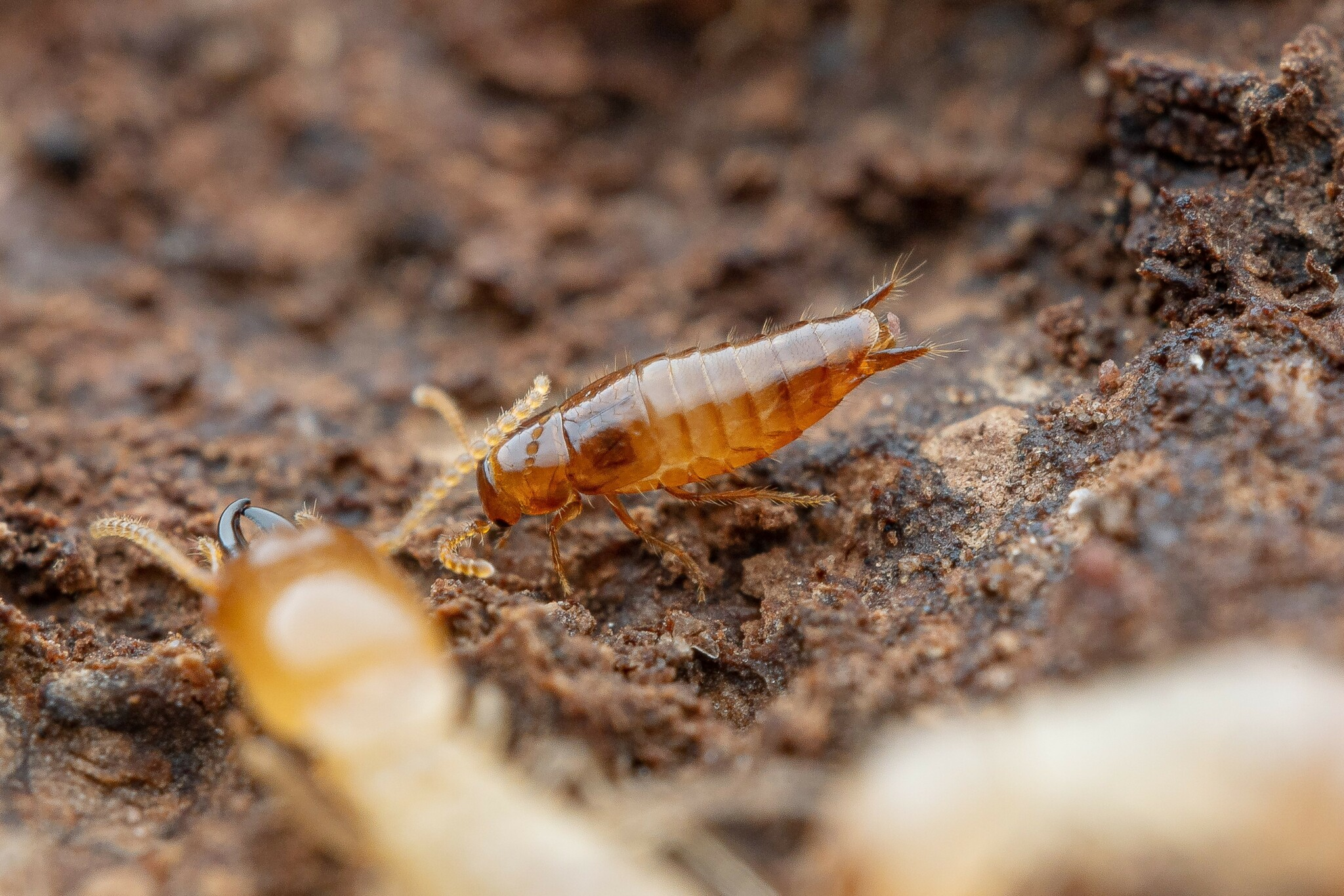
- Trichopsenius sp.

Scientific classification
- Kingdom: Animalia
- Phylum: Arthropoda
- Clade: Pancrustacea
- Class: Insecta
- Order: Coleoptera
- Suborder: Polyphaga
- Infraorder: Staphyliniformia
- Family: Staphylinidae
- Subfamily: Aleocharinae
- Tribe: Trichopseniini; LeConte & Horn, 1883

= Trichopseniini =

Tribe of insects

Trichopseniini is a tribe of rove beetles in the subfamily Aleocharinae. It was first described by J.L. LeConte and G.H. Horn in 1883. It consists of 54 species split between 16 genera.

== Genera ==
- Congopsenius
- Cretotrichopsenius
- Hamitopsenius
- Mastopsenius
- Megaxenistusa
- Papuapsenius
- Parrhinopsenius
- Prorhinopsenius
- Rhinotermopsenius
- Schedolimulus
- Schizelythron
- Seeversia
- Termitona
- Termitopsenius
- Trichopsenius
- Xenistusa
