= Philopota =

Scientific classification
- Domain: Eukaryota
- Kingdom: Animalia
- Phylum: Arthropoda
- Class: Insecta
- Order: Diptera
- Family: Acroceridae
- Subfamily: Philopotinae
- Genus: Philopota; Wiedemann, 1830

Type species
- Philopota conica Wiedemann, 1830

Genus of flies

Philopota is a genus of small-headed flies in the family Acroceridae. It is the type genus of the subfamily Philopotinae.

== Species ==
- Philopota amazonensis Gillung & Nihei, 2016
- Philopota castanea Gillung & Nihei, 2016
- Philopota conica Wiedemann, 1830
- Philopota costaricensis Gillung & Nihei, 2016
- Philopota dissimilis Gillung & Nihei, 2016
- Philopota flavimaculata Gillung & Nihei, 2016
- Philopota flavolateralis Brunetti, 1926
- Philopota fuscofemorata Gillung & Nihei, 2016
- Philopota grossii Gillung & Nihei, 2016
- Philopota histrio Erichson, 1840
- Philopota liturata Westwood, 1848
- Philopota longirostris Gillung & Nihei, 2016
- Philopota lugubris Williston, 1901
- Philopota minuta Gillung & Nihei, 2016
- Philopota multivenata Gillung & Nihei, 2016
- Philopota schlingeri Gillung & Nihei, 2016
- Philopota semicincta Schiner, 1868
- Philopota tepicensis Gillung & Nihei, 2016
- Philopota truquii Bellardi, 1859
- Philopota tuberculata Westwood, 1848
- Philopota turbinata Erichson, 1840
- Philopota vitrialata Gillung & Nihei, 2016
