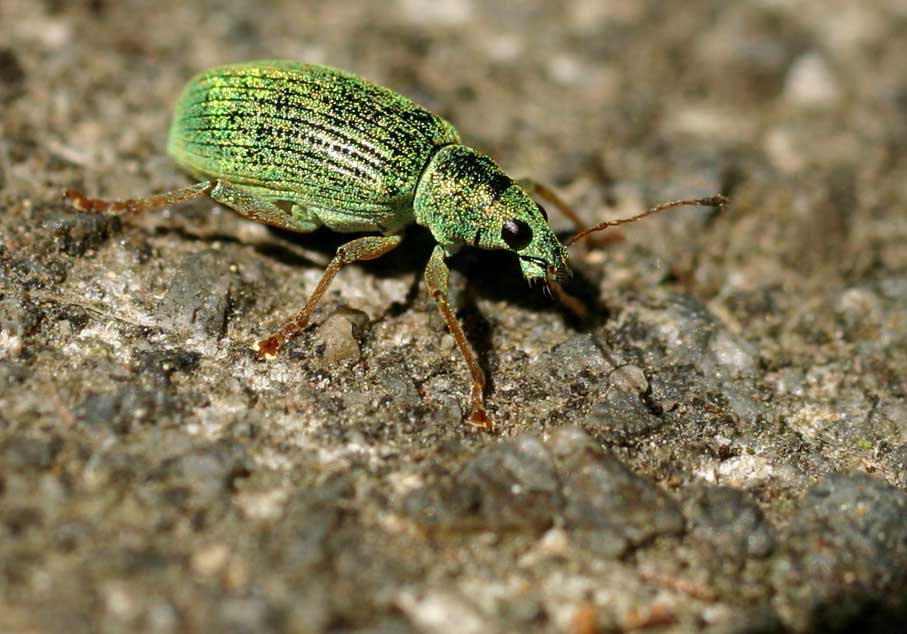
- Polydrusus formosus

Scientific classification
- Kingdom: Animalia
- Phylum: Arthropoda
- Clade: Pancrustacea
- Class: Insecta
- Order: Coleoptera
- Suborder: Polyphaga
- Infraorder: Cucujiformia
- Superfamily: Curculionoidea
- Family: Curculionidae
- Subfamily: Entiminae
- Tribe: Polydrusini; Schönherr, 1823

Genera
- See text

= Polydrusini =

Tribe of beetles

Polydrusini is a weevil tribe in the subfamily Entiminae.

== Genera ==
- Apodrosus
- Auchmeresthes
- Bremondiscytropus
- Cautoderus
- Gobidrusus
- Homapterus
- Liophloeus
- Pachyrhinus
- Polydrosodes
- Polydrusus
- Pythis
- Rungsythropus
- Sciadrusus
- Sitonapterus
