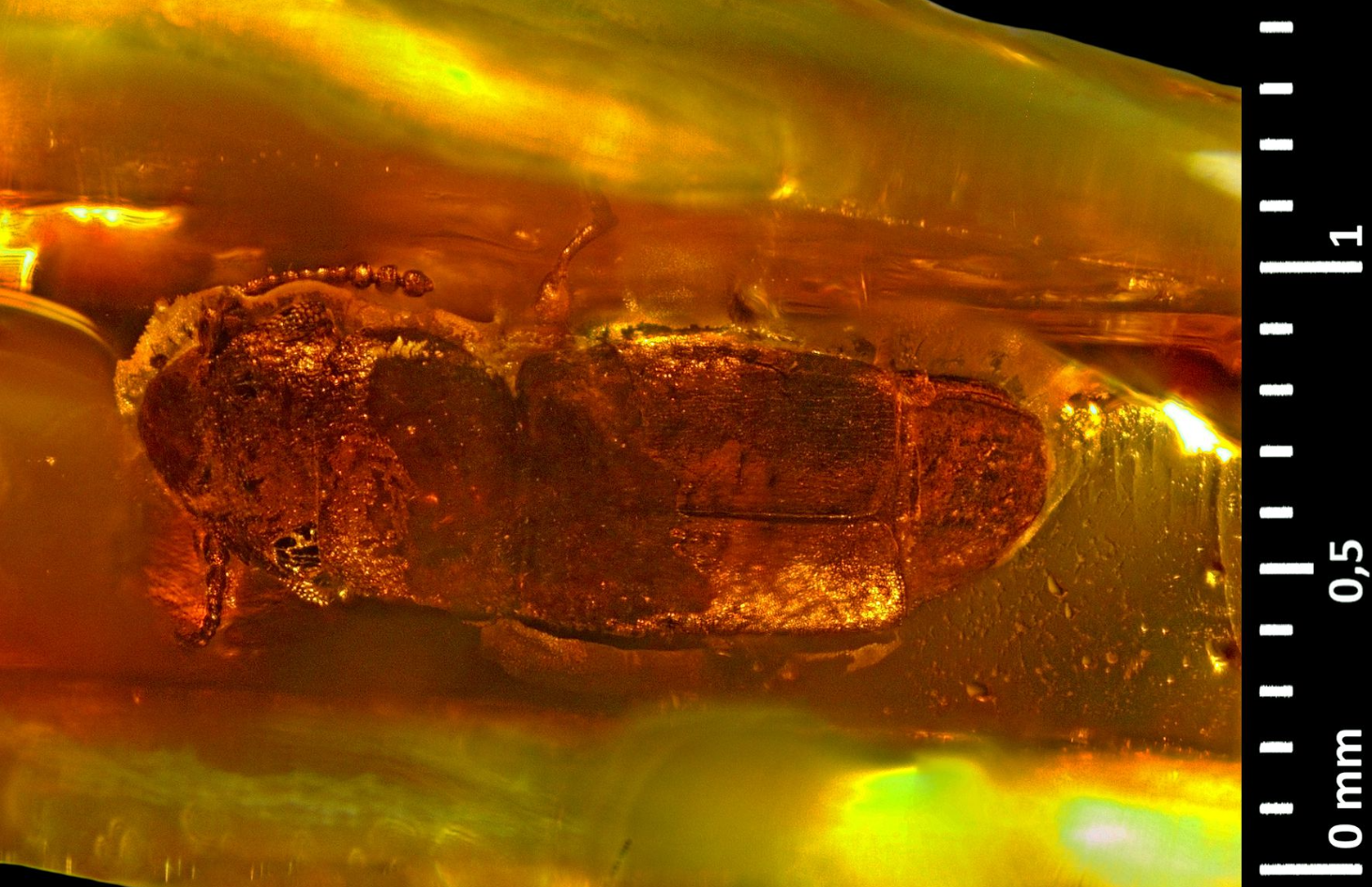

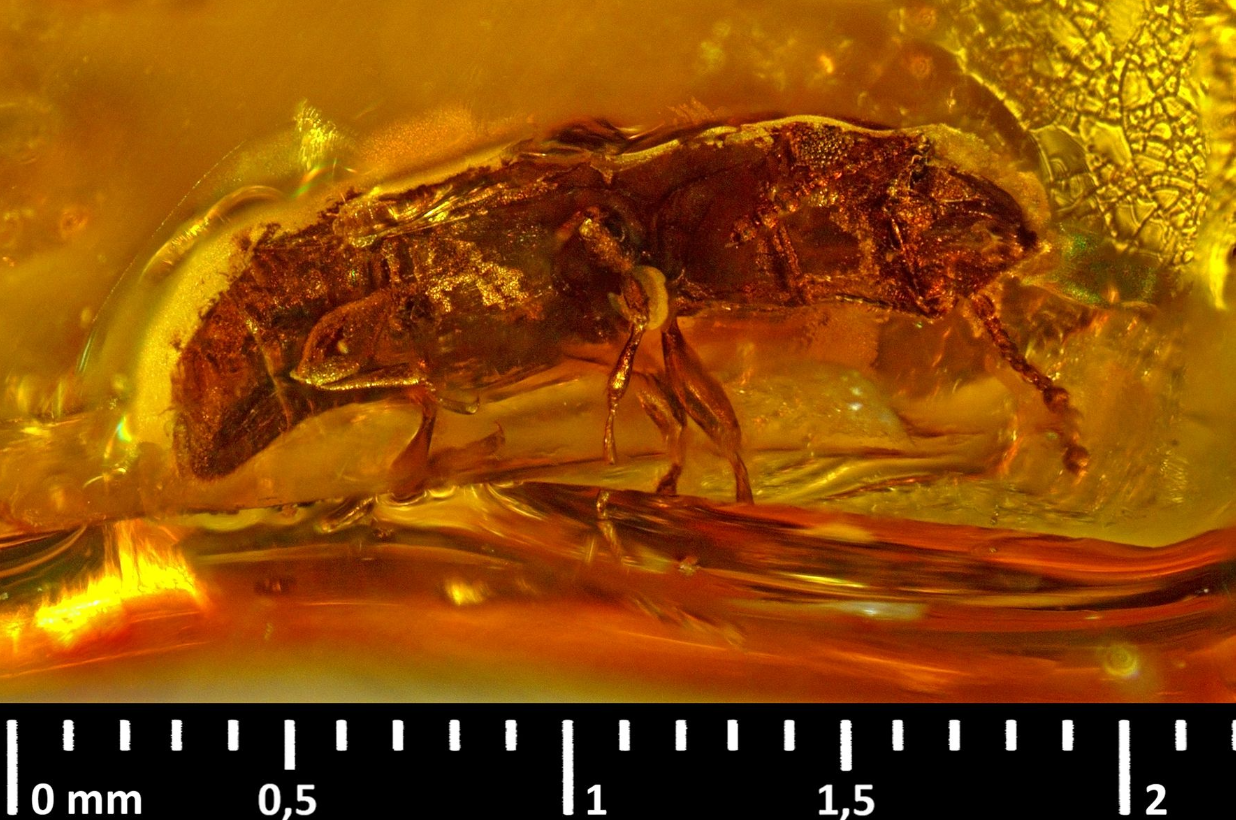
- Specimen of Smicrips europeus in French Eocene Oise amber in dorsal (top) and ventral (bottom) views

Scientific classification
- Kingdom: Animalia
- Phylum: Arthropoda
- Clade: Pancrustacea
- Class: Insecta
- Order: Coleoptera
- Suborder: Polyphaga
- Infraorder: Cucujiformia
- Superfamily: Cucujoidea
- Family: Smicripidae; Horn, 1879

Genera
- Smicrips; †Mesosmicrips

= Smicripidae =

Smicripidae Temporal range: Cenomanian–Recent

Family of beetles

Smicripidae is a family of beetles, in the superfamily Cucujoidea. The common name for this family is palmetto beetles. The family only has one extant genus, Smicrips, with six extant species native to tropical and subtropical regions of the Americas and extinct species from the Eocene of Europe and one extinct genus, Mesosmicrips, known from the mid Cretaceous (earliest Cenomanian) aged Burmese amber. Smicrips larvae are usually found amongst decaying vegetation, while adults are typically found on inflorescences (flower clusters), especially those of Arecaceae (palms), although associations with flowers of Fabaceae (legumes), Passifloraceae, Bombacaceae and Cactaceae (cactus) have also been recorded. Their diet is unknown.
