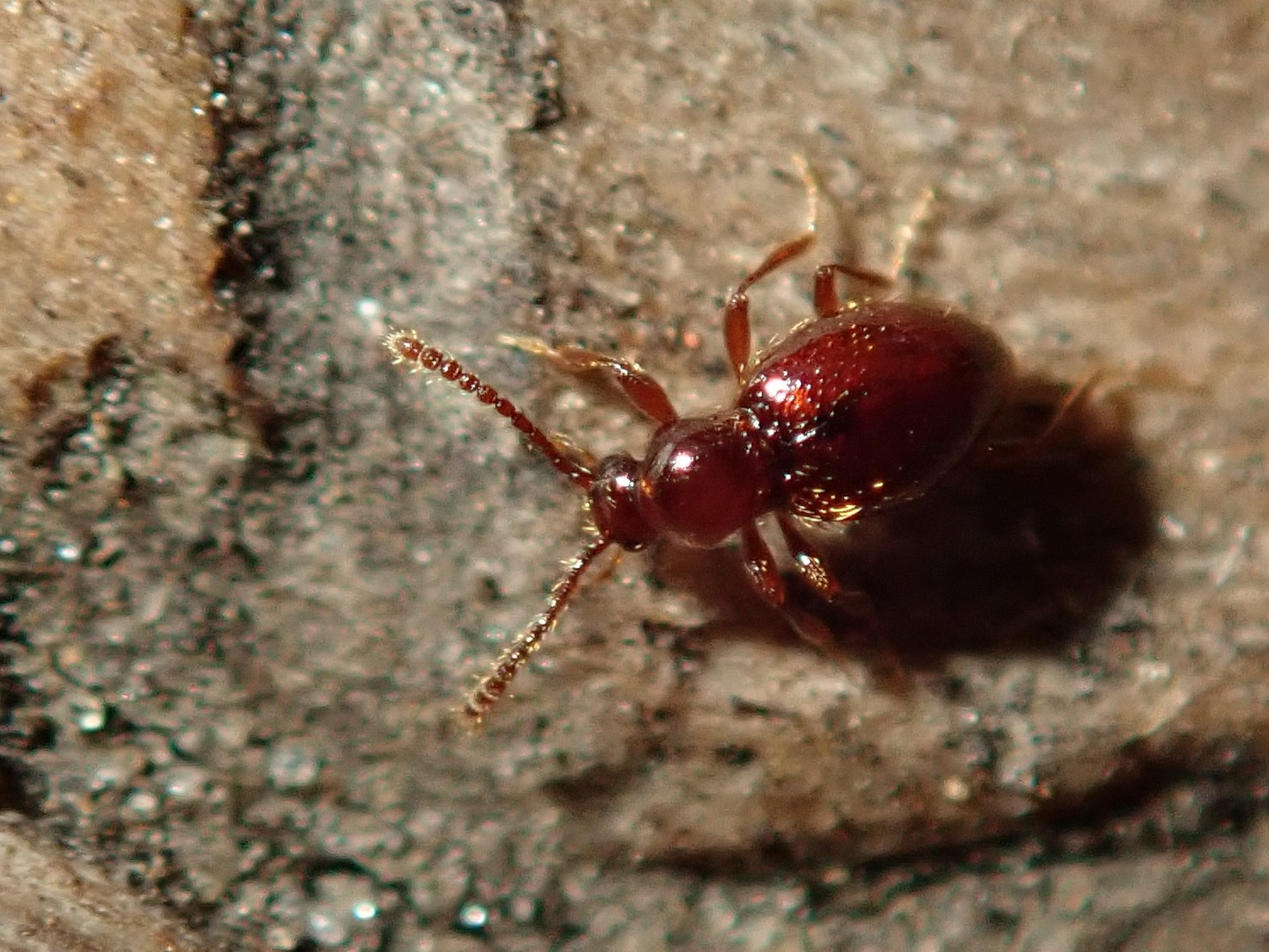
- Stenichnus godarti, Germany

Scientific classification
- Domain: Eukaryota
- Kingdom: Animalia
- Phylum: Arthropoda
- Class: Insecta
- Order: Coleoptera
- Suborder: Polyphaga
- Infraorder: Staphyliniformia
- Family: Staphylinidae
- Subfamily: Scydmaeninae
- Supertribe: Scydmaenitae
- Tribe: Stenichnini; Fauvel, 1885

Type genus
- Cyrtoscydmus Motschulsky, 1869

Synonyms
- Glandulariini Schaufuss, 1889; Siamitini Franz, 1989 [syn. Jaloszynski (2005: 566)]; Cyrtoscydmini Schaufuss, 1889 [syn. by Newton, 2015: 758]

= Stenichnini =

Tribe of beetles

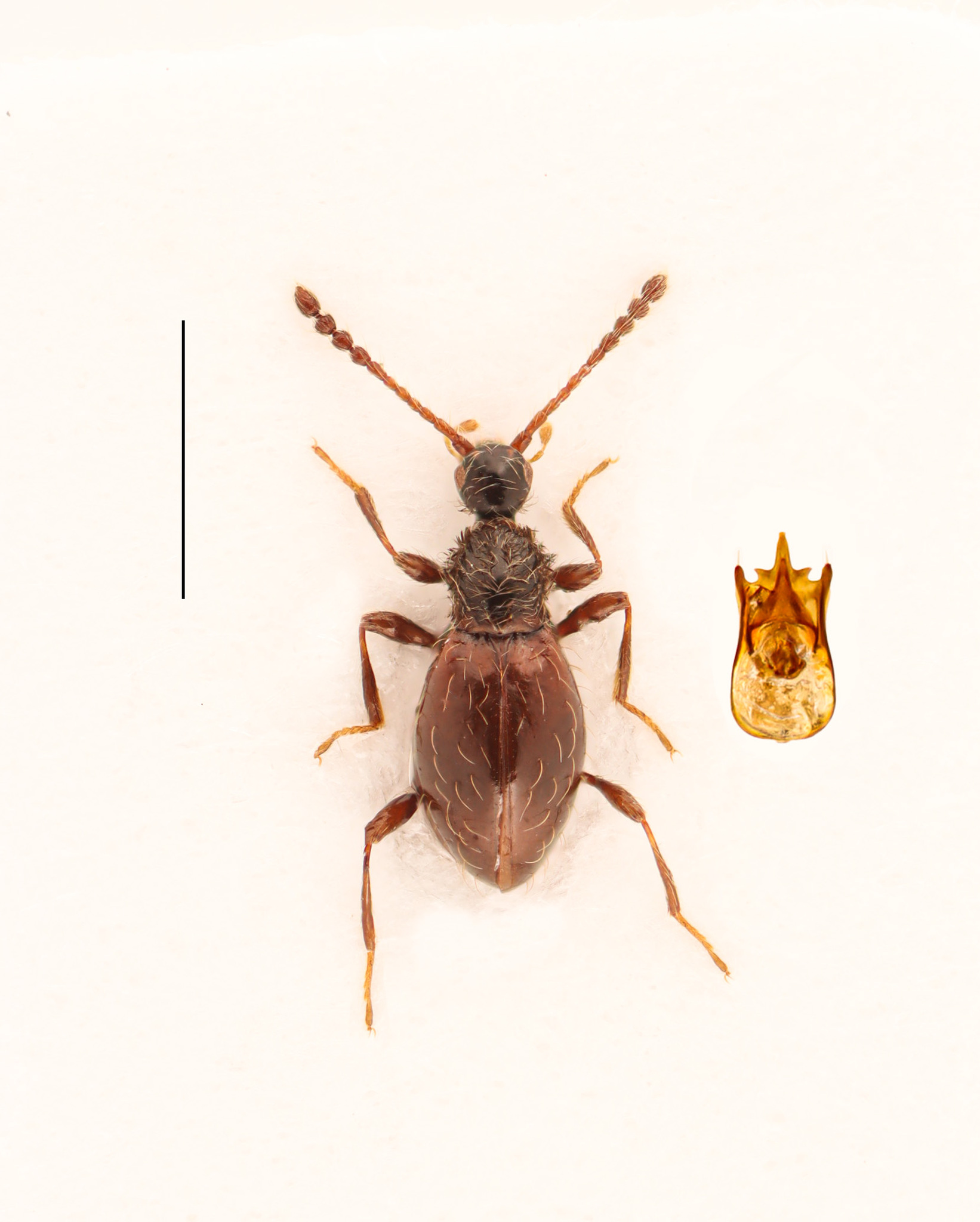
Euconnus clavipes, Canada

Stenichnini is a large tribe under subfamily Scydmaeninae, with more than 80 genera and 4000 species. It includes tribus such as Euconnus, Microscydmus and Neuraphes.

== List of genera ==
These 86 genera belong to the tribe Stenichnini:

- Aenigmaphes Jałoszyński, 2020
- Afroeudesis Franz, 1963
- Alloraphes Franz, 1980
- Amimoscydmus Jałoszyński, 2013
- Anhoraeomorphus Franz, 1986
- Archiconnus Franz, 1980
- Austrostenichnus Franz, 1971
- Bellendenker Jałoszyński, 2017
- Bicarinulodes Jałoszyński, 2019
- Brachycepsis Brendel, 1889
- Catalinus Casey, 1897
- Delius Casey, 1897
- Elacatophora Schaufuss, L. W., 1884
- Euconnomorphus Franz, 1980
- Euconnus Thomson, C. G., 1859
- Heteroscydmus Franz, 1980
- Heterotetramelus Franz, 1971
- Himaloconnus Franz, 1979
- Homoconnus Sharp, 1887
- Horaeomorphus Schaufuss, L. W., 1889
- Kangarooconnus Jałoszyński, 2017
- Leascydmus Jałoszyński, 2014
- Leptocharis Reitter, 1887
- Leptoderoides Croissandeau, 1898
- Loeblites Franz, 1986
- Lophioderus Casey, 1897
- Madagaphes Jałoszyński, 2018
- Magellanoconnus Franz, 1967
- Meridaphes Jałoszyński, 2015
- Mexiconnus Jałoszyński, 2013
- Microraphes Franz, 1980
- Microscydmus Saulcy & Croissandeau, 1893
- Mimoscydmus Franz, 1980
- Napochomorphus Franz, 1980
- Napoconnus Franz, 1957
- Neladius Casey, 1897
- Neuraphanax Reitter, 1883
- Neuraphes Thomson, C. G., 1859
- Neuraphoconnus Franz, 1971
- Neuraphomorphus Reitter, 1882
- Noctophus Casey, 1897
- Nogunius Jałoszyński, 2020
- Obesoconnus Jałoszyński, 2014
- Oreoeudesis Franz, 1985
- Palaeoscydmaenus Franz, 1975
- Parapseudoconnus Franz, 1980
- Parascydmus Casey, 1897
- Penicillidmus Jałoszyński, 2014
- Perumicrus Jałoszyński, 2015
- Plaumanniola Costa Lima, 1962
- Protandroconnus Franz, 1989
- Protoconnus Franz, 1967
- Psepharobius King, 1864
- Pseudoraphes Franz, 1980
- Rutaraphes Jałoszyński, 2015
- Schuelkelia Jałoszyński, 2015
- Sciacharis Broun, 1893
- Scydmaenilla King, 1864
- Scydmaenozila Jałoszyński, 2014
- Scydmepitoxis Jałoszyński, 2014
- Scydmoraphes Reitter, 1891
- Siamites Franz, 1989
- Siamitoides Jałoszyński, 2020
- Sibylloconnus Jałoszyński, 2020
- Sinonichnus Jałoszyński, 2021
- Spinosciacharis Jałoszyński, 2014
- Stenichnaphes Franz, 1980
- Stenichnoconnus Franz, 1985
- Stenichnodes Franz, 1966
- Stenichnoteras Scott, 1922
- Stenichnus Thomson, C. G., 1859
- Syndicus Motschulsky, 1851
- Taphroscydmus Casey, 1897
- Trichocircus Jałoszyński, 2019
- Tridensius Jałoszyński, 2020
- Venezolanoconnus Franz, 1988
- Zeanichnus Jałoszyński, 2013
- † Cenomaniola Jałoszyński & Yamamoto, 2017
- † Glaesoconnus Jałoszyński & Perkovsky, 2016
- † Hyperstenichnus Jałoszyński & Perrichot, 2017
- † Loeblitoides Jałoszyński, 2019
- † Nuegua Yin, Cai & Newton, 2018
- † Pangusyndicus Yin, Ziwei, Zhou & Cai, 2018
- † Rovnoscydmus Jałoszyński & Perkovsky, 2016
- † Scydmobisetia Jałoszyński & Yamamoto, 2016
- † Taimyraphes Jałoszyński & Perkovsky, 2019

== Bibliography ==
- Franz, H. 1989: 4. Beitrag zur Scydmaenidenfauna von Thailand (Die Scydmaenidenausbeute von D.H. Burckhardt u. I. Lobl). Revue suisse de Zoologie, 96: 33–80.
- Paweł Jałoszyński (2005). "Taxonomic notes on the Oriental Scydmaenidae. Part II: systematic position of the Siamitini Franz, with redescription of Siamites loebli Franz (Coleoptera: Staphylinoidea)" (PDF). Genus: 16(4): 563–572.
- I.Löbl & A.Smetana, ed. (2004). "Hydrophiloidea-Staphylinoidea" (PDF). Catalogue of Palearctic Coleopter. 2. Denmark: pollo Books, Stenstrup: 206. ISBN 87-88757-74-9.
