= Kachinus =

Kachinus Temporal range: Upper Cretaceous (Cenomanian?) 92 Ma

Scientific classification
- Kingdom: Animalia
- Phylum: Arthropoda
- Class: Insecta
- Order: Coleoptera
- Suborder: Polyphaga
- Infraorder: Staphyliniformia
- Family: Staphylinidae
- Subfamily: Scydmaeninae
- Supertribe: Scydmaenitae
- Genus: †Kachinus; Chatzimanolis, Engel, & Newton, 2010
- Species: †K. antennatus

Binomial name
- †Kachinus antennatus Chatzimanolis, Engel & Newton, 2010

Genus of beetles

Kachinus is an extinct genus of ant-like stone beetle in the family Staphylinidae containing the single species Kachinus antennatus.

== History and classification ==
The type species, K. antennatus, is known from only the holotype, a single, complete adult, now deposited in the American Museum of Natural History as specimen number "AMNH Bu-113". The amber specimen is from deposits in Kachin State, Tanai Village, 105 kilometres (65 mi) northwest of Myitkyina, Myanmar.

The holotype was first studied by Stylianos Chatzimanolis of the University of Tennessee, Michael Engel of the University of Kansas, and Alfred Newton of the Field Museum. Chatzimanolis, Engel and Newton published their 2010 type description for K. antennatus in the journal Cretaceous Research. The genus name is a masculine derivation of the Kachin State in Northern Myanmar where the amber containing the type specimen was unearthed. The species name antennatus is Latin, signifying "antennaed".

The second species, K. magnificus, was described from the Albian amber from Spain; however, this species was subsequently made the type species of a separate genus Archeutheia by Jałoszyński & Peris (2016).

== Description ==
The beetle is small, only 0.6 millimetres (0.024 in) long, possessing a light brown body with yellowish brown legs, antennae, and head. Kachinus has a unique combination of characters found in both the Cephennini and Eutheiini tribes of the Scydmaeninae supertribe Scydmaenitae. Elytra and pronotum which are not clearly discontinuous and a head which does not have a narrowed area from the vertex to the occiput are features found in the modern Cephennini genera. However the overall pronotum shape and body shape combined with shortened elytra are distinct features of Eutheiini. It is noted that with the distinctly elevated mesosternal keel Kachinus is similar in appearance to the modern genus Paraneseuthia.
