= Cephenniini =

Scientific classification
- Kingdom: Animalia
- Phylum: Arthropoda
- Clade: Pancrustacea
- Class: Insecta
- Order: Coleoptera
- Suborder: Polyphaga
- Infraorder: Staphyliniformia
- Family: Staphylinidae
- Subfamily: Scydmaeninae
- Supertribe: Cephenniitae
- Tribe: Cephenniini; Reitter, 1882

Tribe of beetles

Cephenniini is a tribe of rove beetles in the supertribe Cephenniitae. It was first described by Reitter in 1882. It contains 25 genera and 742 accepted species.

== Genera ==
- Cepehennium
- Cephazteca
- Cephennium
- Cephennococcus
- Cephennodes
- Cephennomicrus
- Cephennula
- Clavomicrus
- Etelea
- Eutheimorphus
- Foveomicrus
- Furcodes
- Hlavaciellus
- Indomicrus
- Lathomicrus
- Monostrophennium
- Nanopthalmus
- Papuamicrus
- Pacacephennium
- Pomphopsilla
- Praphennium
- Pseudocephennium
- Shyri
- Trichokrater
- Trurlia
