= Baltostigini =

Scientific classification
- Kingdom: Animalia
- Phylum: Arthropoda
- Clade: Pancrustacea
- Class: Insecta
- Order: Coleoptera
- Suborder: Polyphaga
- Infraorder: Staphyliniformia
- Family: Staphylinidae
- Subfamily: Scydmaeninae
- Supertribe: Mastigitae
- Tribe: Baltostigini; Jałoszyński & Brunke, 2018

Baltostigini is an extant tribe of rove beetles in the supertribe Mastigitae. It was first described by Fleming in 1821. It contains one genus, Baltostigus, with four species.

== Species ==
- Baltostigus antennatus
- Baltostgus horribilis
- Baltostigus striatipennis
- Baltostigus substriatus
