= Leptomastacini =

Scientific classification
- Kingdom: Animalia
- Phylum: Arthropoda
- Clade: Pancrustacea
- Class: Insecta
- Order: Coleoptera
- Suborder: Polyphaga
- Infraorder: Staphyliniformia
- Family: Staphylinidae
- Subfamily: Scydmaeninae
- Supertribe: Mastigitae
- Tribe: Leptomastacini; Casey, 1897

Tribe of beetles

Leptomastacini is a tribe of rove beetles in the supertribe Mastigitae. It was first described by Casey in 1897. It contains 4 genera with 33 accepted species.

== Genera ==
- Ablepton
- Archemastax
- Leptomastax
- Taurablepton
