= Papusus =

Scientific classification
- Kingdom: Animalia
- Phylum: Arthropoda
- Clade: Pancrustacea
- Class: Insecta
- Order: Coleoptera
- Suborder: Polyphaga
- Infraorder: Staphyliniformia
- Family: Staphylinidae
- Subfamily: Scydmaeninae
- Supertribe: Mastigitae
- Tribe: Papusini; Jałoszyński & Brunke, 2018
- Genus: Papusus; Casey, 1897

Genus of beetles

Papusus is a genus of rove beetles in the supertribe Mastigitae, first described in 1897. It is the only genus in the tribe Papusini, first described by Jałoszyński and Brunke in 2018. The genus has nine accepted species.

== Species ==
- Papusus andrewsi
- Papusus esparanza
- Papusus giulianii
- Papusus loebli
- Papusus macer
- Papusus naranjus
- Papusus panamint
- Papusus piecus
- Papusus werneri
