= Wairaki Stream =

Wairaki Stream Duck Creek
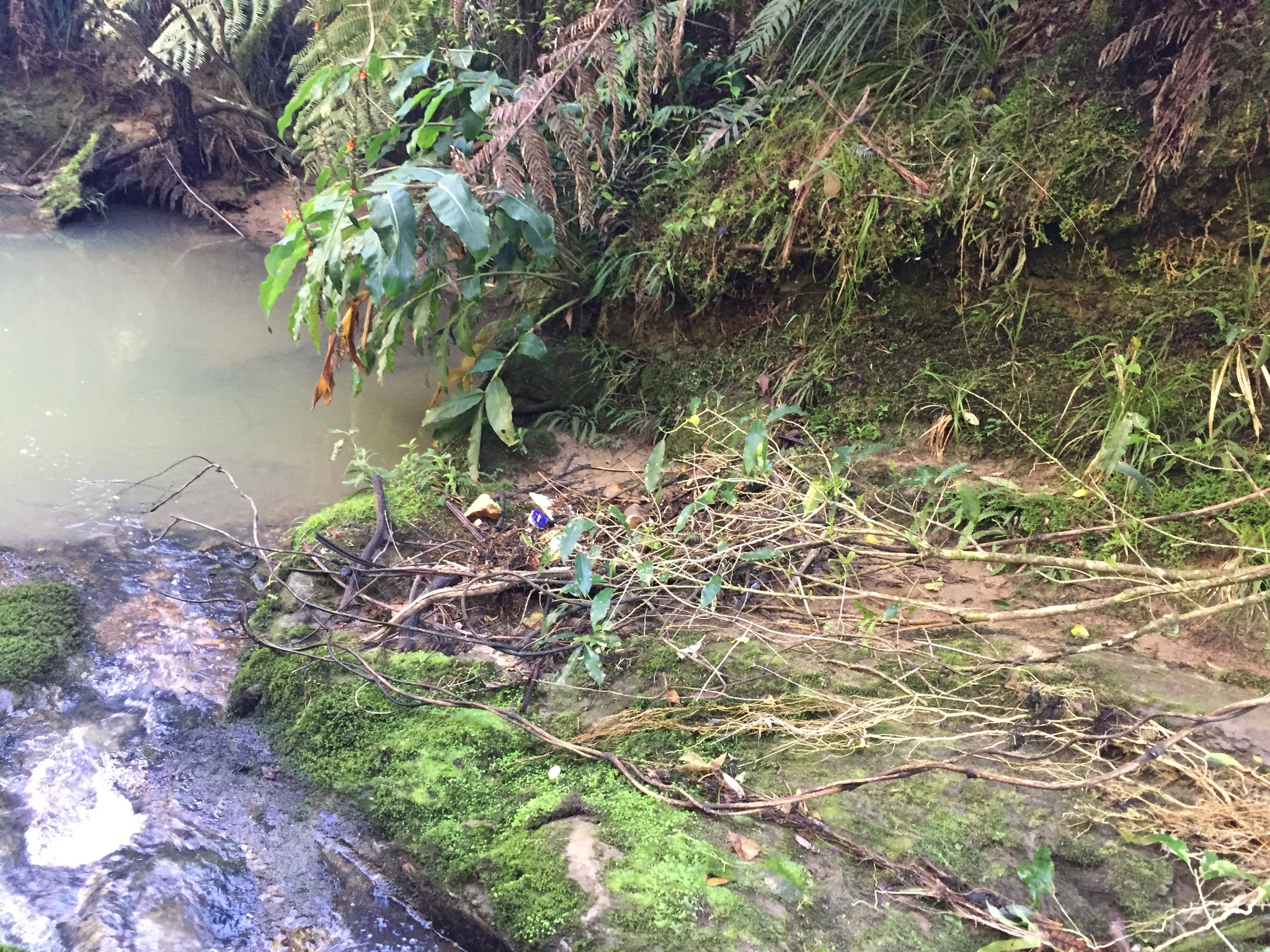
- The Wairaki Stream in Lynfield, Auckland, New Zealand

- Mouth of Wairaki Stream Wairaki Stream (New Zealand)
- Route of the Wairaki Stream
- Native name: Wairaki

Location
- Country: New Zealand
- Region: Auckland Region

Physical characteristics
- Source: Wairaki / Lynfield Reserve
  - coordinates: 36.92672°S 174.72193°E
  - elevation: 45 m (148 ft)
- Mouth: Lynfield Cove
  - coordinates: 36.92729°S 174.71139°E
  - elevation: 0 m (0 ft)
- Length: 2 km (1.2 mi)

Basin features
- Progression: Wairaki Stream → Lynfield Cove → Blockhouse Bay → Manukau Harbour → Tasman Sea

Wairaki Stream is a stream in the suburb of Lynfield in Auckland, New Zealand. One of two named streams that flows into the Manukau Harbour from the Auckland isthmus, the stream is primarily surrounded by reserves, and is a home for native bird and plant species. During suburban development, the mouth of the stream was fed into a culvert, and a stone wall constructed in Lynfield Cove, where a park was developed on the reclaimed land. The beetle species Microscydmus lynfieldi was first discovered at Wairaki Stream.

== Etymology ==
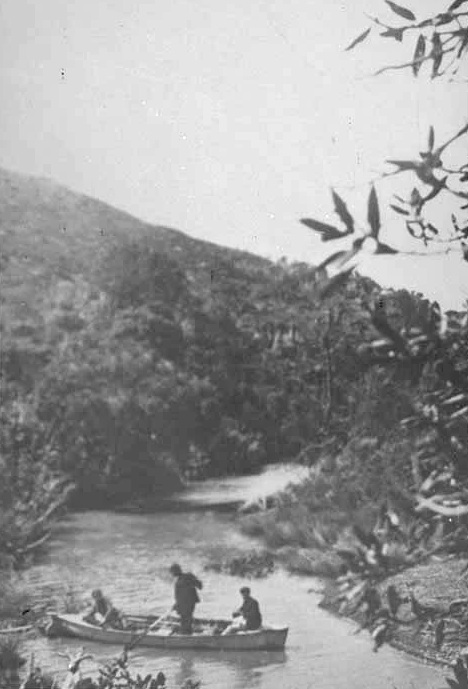
Wairaki Stream circa 1900–1919, prior to suburban development of Lynfield.

Wairaki is the traditional Tāmaki Māori name for the stream. The name refers to the northerly flow of the upper section of the stream. Wairaki Stream is occasionally referred to by the name Duck Creek, and as the Waikaraki Stream.

In 2022, the Wairaki Stream Reserve was given two bilingual Māori language names: the lower section near Lynfield Cove was named Wairaki ki tai, while the upper section was named Wairaki ki uta.

== Geography ==
Wairaki Stream in 2 km (1.2 mi) in length, and is fed by storm-water culverts from neighbouring residential properties. The stream begins at Wairaki / Lynfield Reserve, southwest of Lynfield Shopping Centre. It flows northwards then westwards through the Wairaki Stream Reserve. The final 100 m (330 ft) of the stream flows through a culvert, entering the Manukau Harbour at Lynfield Cove.

The Wairaki Stream is primarily formed from Waitemata Group sandstone. The southern Auckland isthmus is thought to have been podocarp-broadleaf forest before the arrival of people, and by 1910 the area was covered in "mixed bush" and mānuka bush. Alongside Anns Creek, the Wairaki Stream is only one of two named streams that flows into the Manukau Harbour from the Auckland isthmus.

== Biodiversity ==
The majority of the stream is forested with New Zealand native bush, and the area is home to numerous native bird species. The neighbouring reserve is home to a mix of exotic species, including river sheoak, Mexican cypress and camphor laurel, with native species including silver fern, māhoe, māpou, pigeonwood, hangehange and kawakawa. Large native trees are uncommon along the stream banks, however some areas feature kānuka and regenerating kahikatea trees. The mouth of the stream is home to species of wetland plants, primarily exotic species as well as native New Zealand species including Juncus prismatocarpus and Typha orientalis.

Microscydmus lynfieldi, one of the smallest beetle species in the world, was discovered at the Wairaki Stream in 1975. The beetle species Notoptenidium oblongum was also first discovered here.

The stream is home to New Zealand longfin eels and banded kōkopu.

== History ==
The Wairaki Stream was visited by missionary William Colenso on 4 February 1842, during which he noticed the abundance of Alseuosmia macrophylla along the stream. For much of its history, the stream mouth was a muddy and rocky area.

The Wairaki Stream catchment was sold to the Crown as a part of an 1841 land purchase from Ngāti Whātua, while the southern was sold as a part of a private land sale in 1845. The northern catchment became property of John Logan Campbell from 1852 to 1910. In 1908, most of area immediately adjacent to the Wairaki Stream was set aside as a reserve, with the wider area to the north used as farmland in the early 20th century.

The suburb of Lynfield was developed in the 1950s, during which many of the reserves surrounding the stream were enlarged. During the 1960s, the Auckland City Council constructed a stone wall at the mouth of the creek and backfilled the tidal section of Wairaki Stream, creating a grassy recreation area.

A local volunteer group, the Friends of Wairaki Stream (FOWS), was established in 2018 in order to undertake conservation work on the stream.

During the 2023 Auckland Anniversary Weekend floods, significant amounts of debris filled up the Wairaki Stream valley. In August 2024, 50 t (49 long tons; 55 short tons) of debris were lifted out by helicopter from the stream.

Since 2013, feasibility studies have investigated options for removing the culvert and daylighting the mouth of the Wairaki Stream.

== Gallery ==
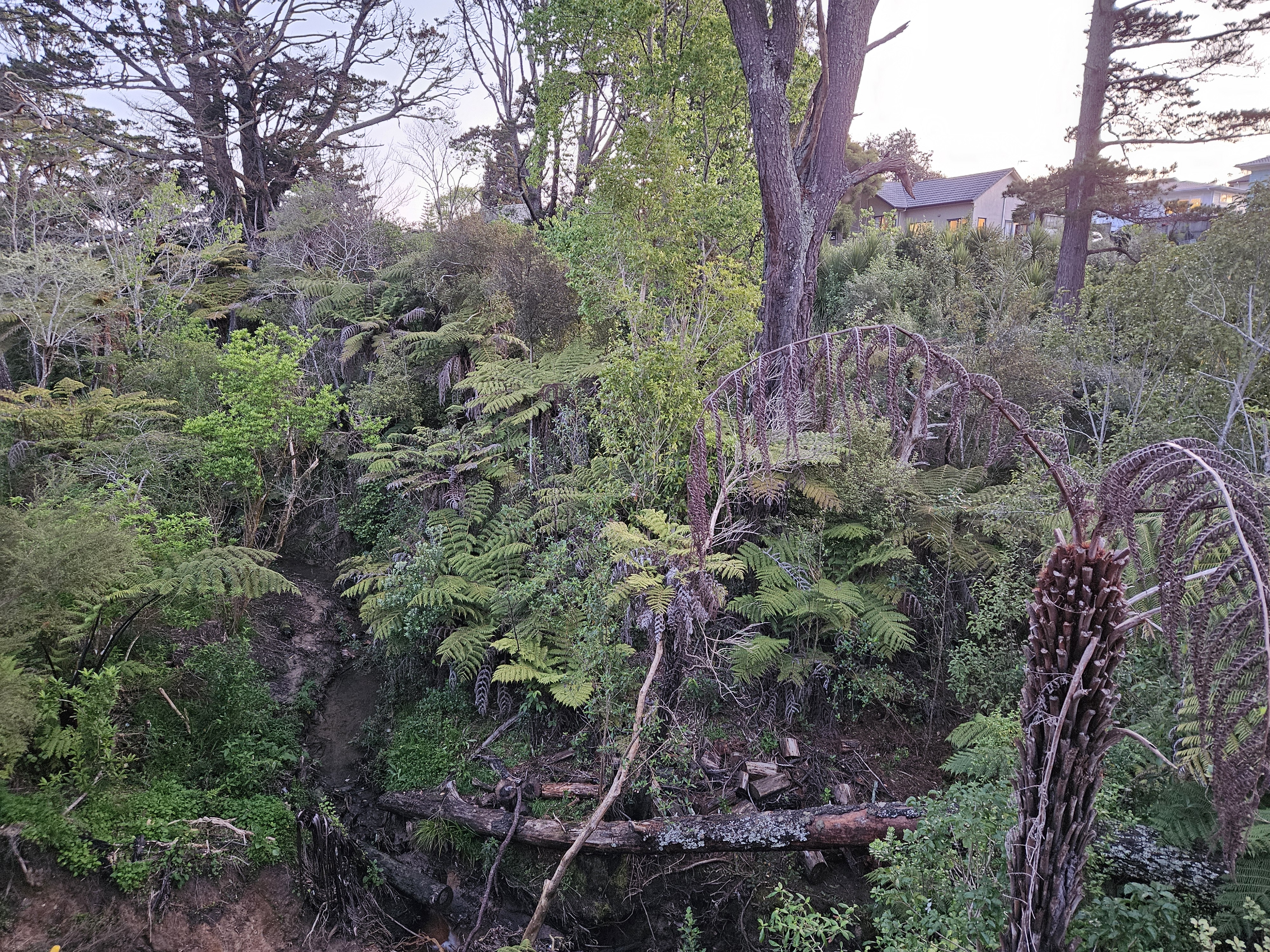
Wairaki Stream at Wairaki / Lynfield Reserve

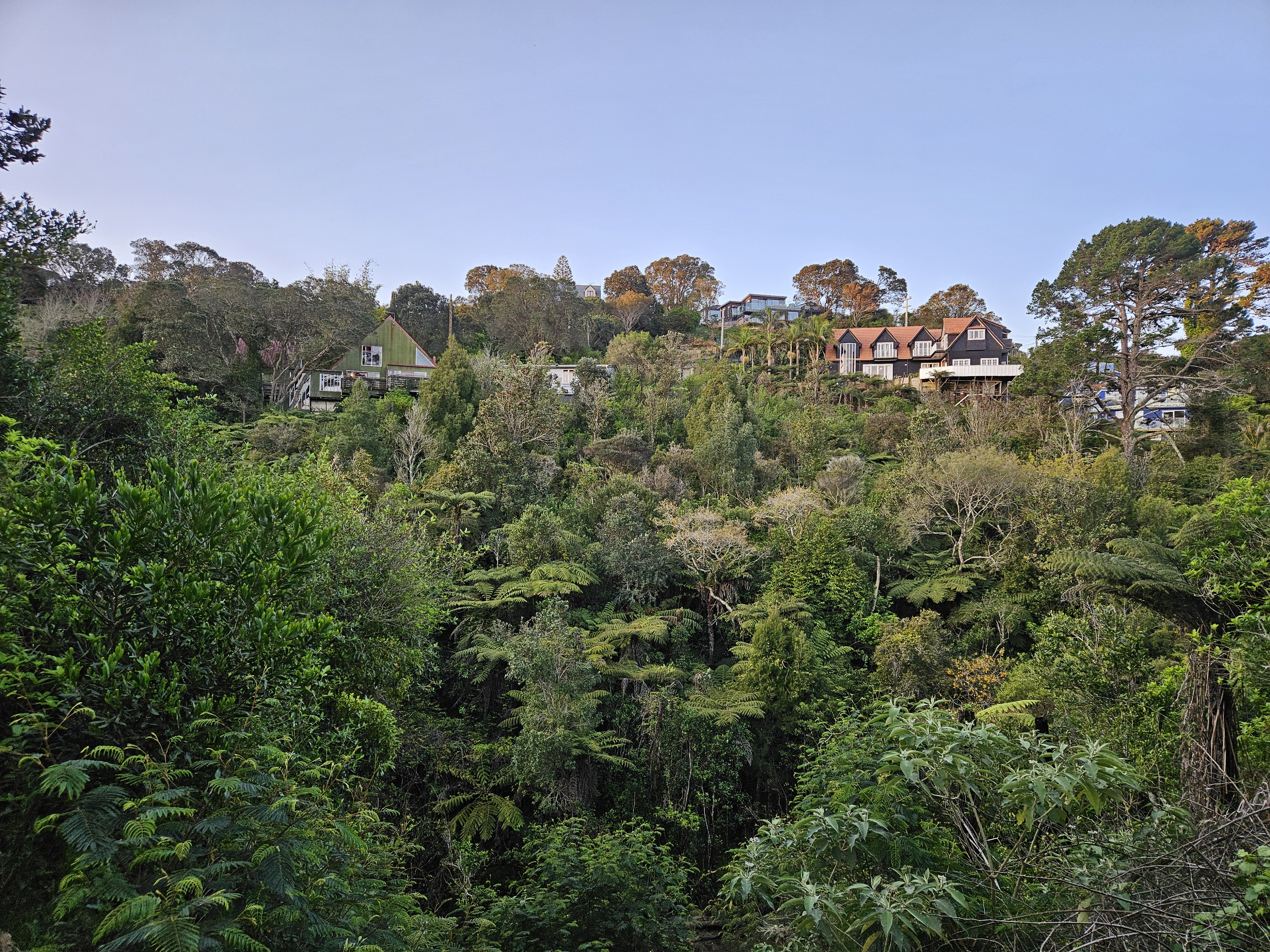
The Wairaki Stream valley

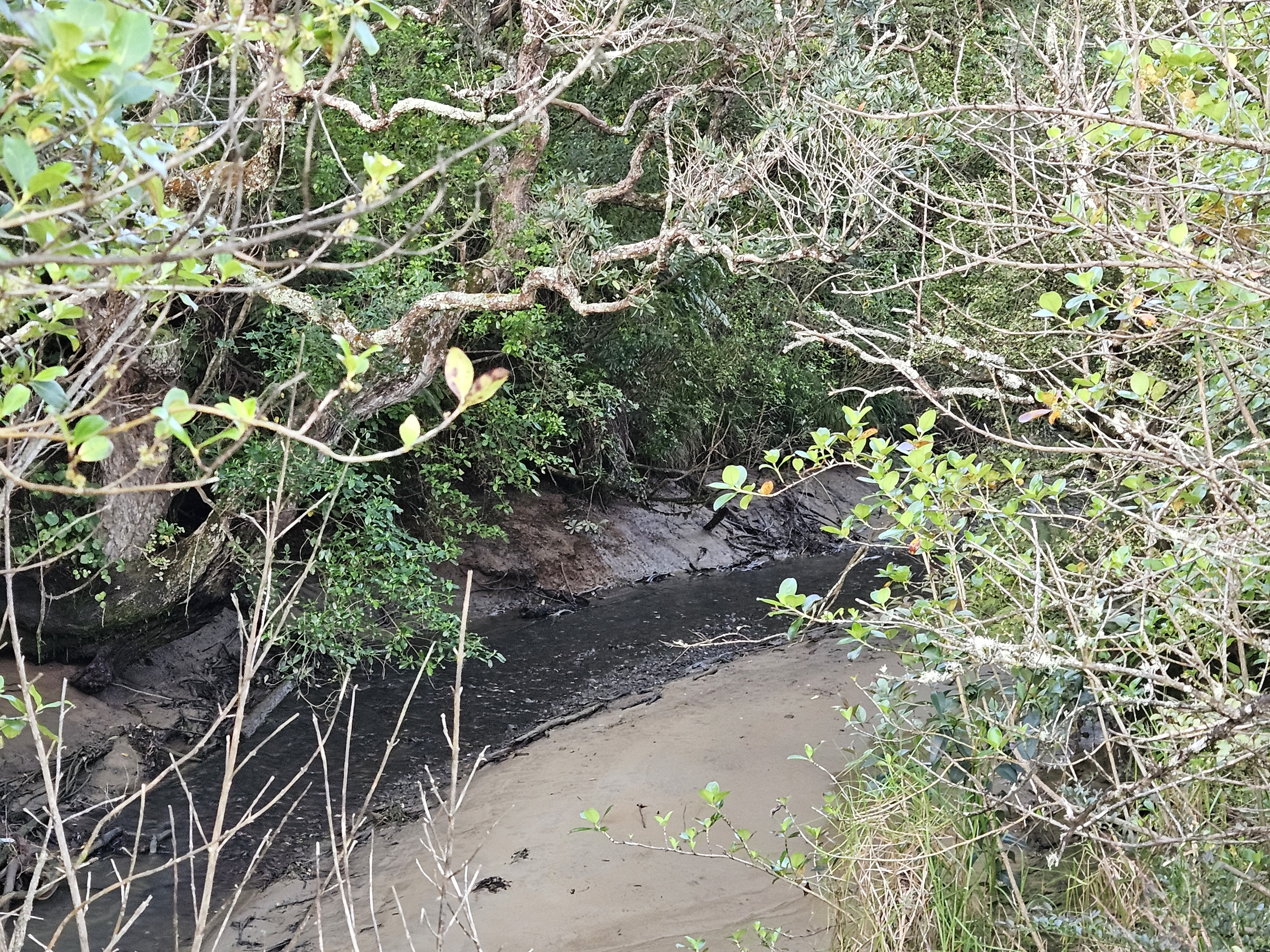
Wairaki Stream at Wairaki Stream Reserve near Lynfield Cove

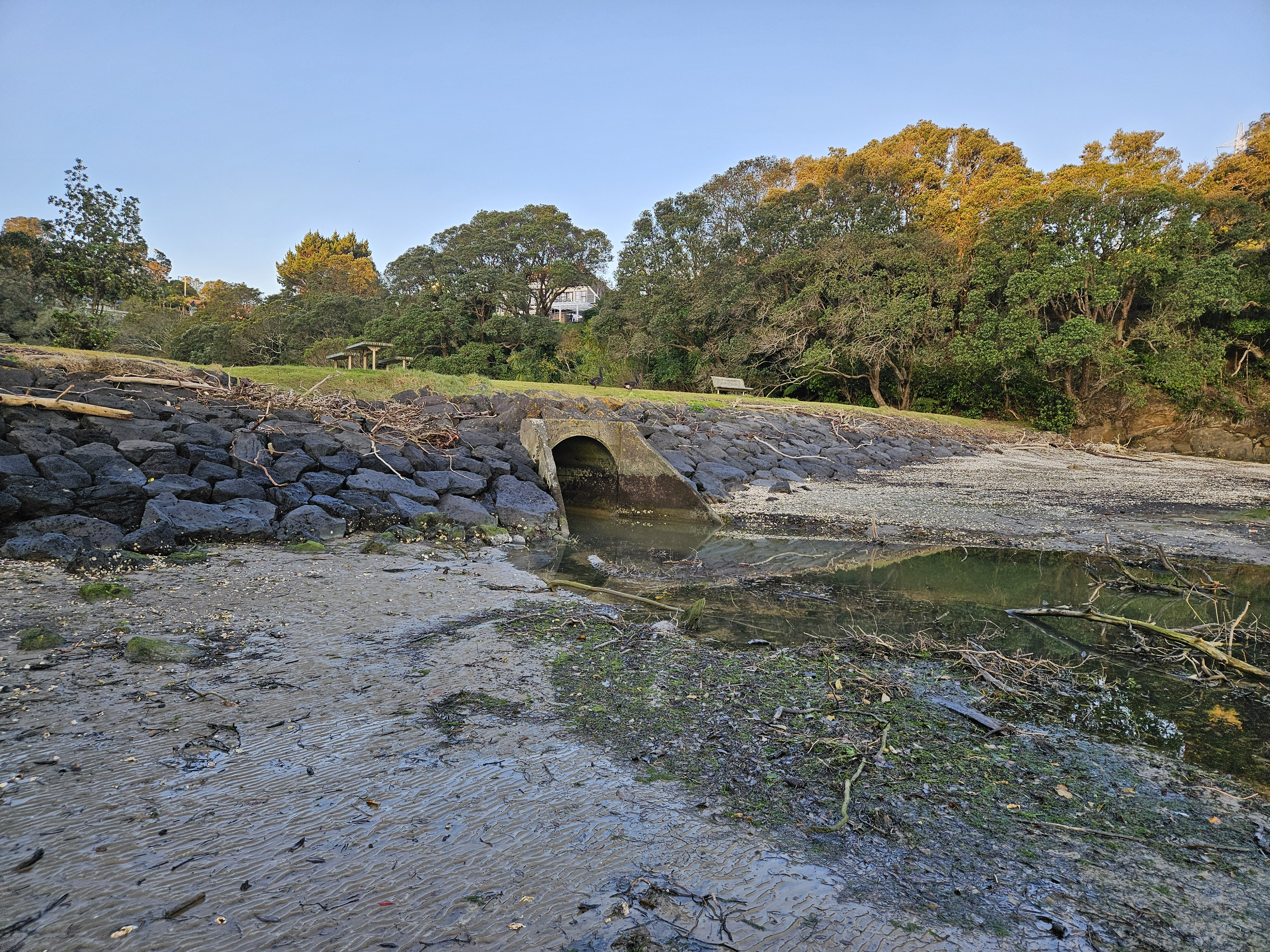
Wairaki Stream mouth and culvert

== See also ==
- List of rivers of New Zealand
