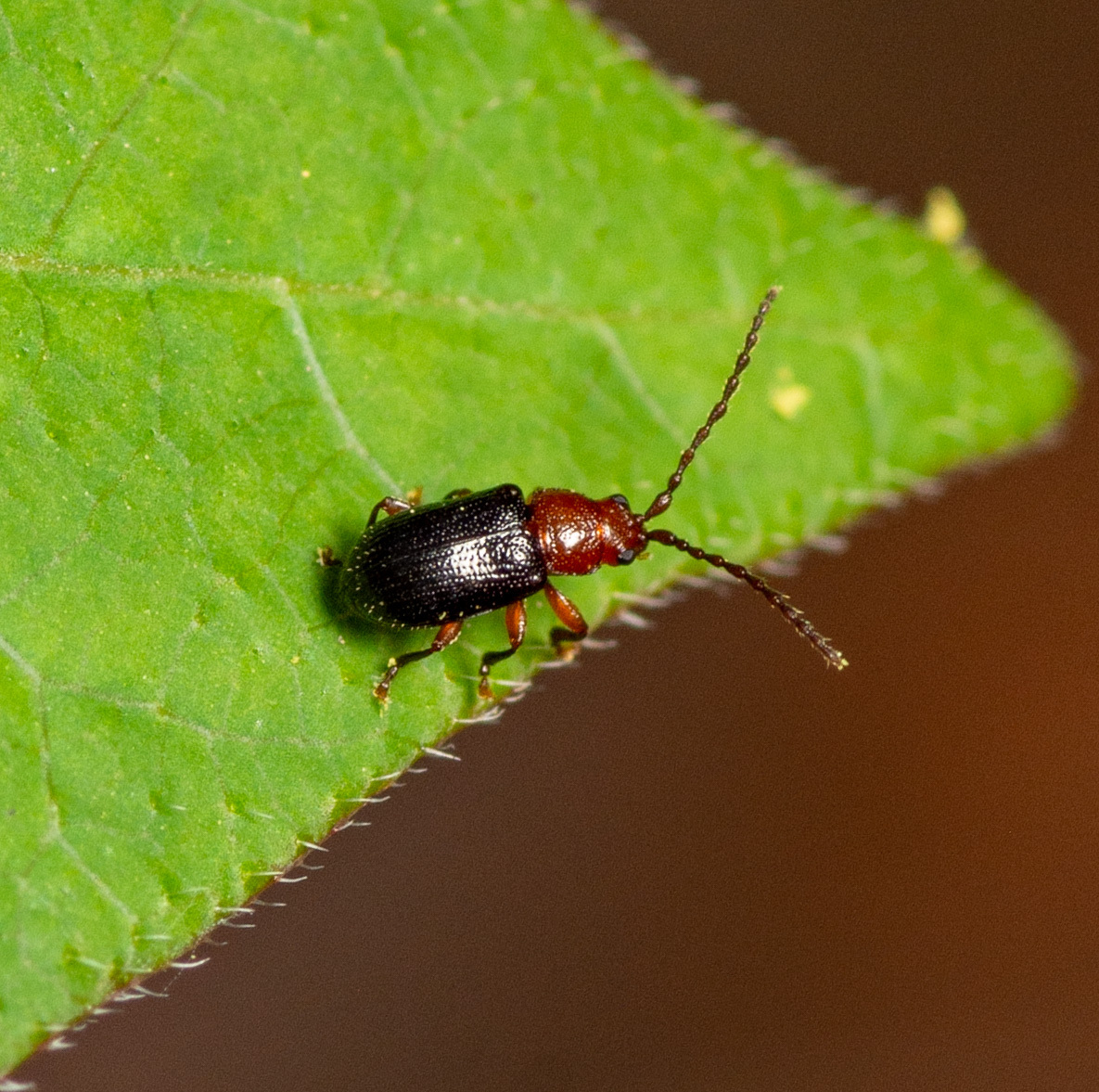
- Aulacothorax copalinus from the United States.

Scientific classification
- Kingdom: Animalia
- Phylum: Arthropoda
- Clade: Pancrustacea
- Class: Insecta
- Order: Coleoptera
- Suborder: Polyphaga
- Infraorder: Cucujiformia
- Superfamily: Chrysomeloidea
- Family: Chrysomelidae
- Subfamily: Galerucinae
- Tribe: Serraticollini; White, 1942
- Genus: Aulacothorax; Boheman, 1858

Type species
- Aulacothorax exilis Boheman, 1858

Synonyms
- Orthaltica Crotch, 1873; Leptotrix Horn, 1889; Micrantipha Blackburn, 1896; Livolia Jacoby, 1903; Leptotrihaltica Heikertinger, 1925; Micrepitrix Laboissiere, 1933; Serraticollis White, 1942; Epithrella Medvedev, 1993; Livoliella Medvedev, 1997

= Aulacothorax =

Genus of flea beetles

Aulacothorax is a genus of leaf beetles (Chrysomelidae) that belongs to the subfamily Galerucinae. Members of this genus are found worldwide, 40 of which are found in the Indomalayan realm. Historically considered a problematic member of the tribe Alticini (flea beetles), the genus is now classified in its own tribe, Serraticollini.

== Taxonomy ==
=== History of research ===
The genus was originally created in 1858 for a single species described from Tahiti, Aulacothorax exilis, which was placed in Scydmaenidae (now considered a subfamily of Staphylinidae). Recently, the holotype of this species was rediscovered in the collections of the Swedish Museum of Natural History, and it was found to belong to the genus Orthaltica. Aulacothorax is the earliest available name for the genus, so the genus Orthaltica was formally placed in synonymy with it in 2017.

Historically, the genus Aulacothorax (or Orthaltica) was classified as a member of the subfamily Alticinae, later re-ranked as a tribe (Alticini) of the subfamily Galerucinae, based on the presence of enlarged femora in the hind legs. Later studies determined that these enlarged femora lack the metafemoral spring, an internal structure found in the hind leg femora of flea beetles that allows them to jump, and members of Aulacothorax are incapable of jumping. A phylogenetic study by Douglas et al. (2023) suggested that Aulacothorax should be separated from Alticini and classified within its own tribe, Serraticollini.

=== Species ===
There are currently 51 described species that belongs to the genus Aulacothorax. A selected list of species can be found below:

- Aulacothorax arabicus (Medvedev, 1997)
- Aulacothorax australis (Konstantinov, 1995)
- Aulacothorax bakeri (Konstantinov, 1995)
- Aulacothorax borneoensis (Konstantinov, 1995)
- Aulacothorax chibi (Takizawa, 2017)
- Aulacothorax coomani (Laboissiere, 1933)
- Aulacothorax copalinus (Fabricius, 1801)
- Aulacothorax exilis Boheman, 1858
- Aulacothorax kirejtshuki (Konstantinov, 1995)
- Aulacothorax konstantinovi (Takizawa, 2017)
- Aulacothorax melinus (Horn, 1889) (poison ivy leaf beetle)
- Aulacothorax mindanaoensis (Konstantinov, 1995)
- Aulacothorax minutiusculus (Csiki, 1939)
- Aulacothorax okinawanus (Gressitt and Kimoto, 1966)
- Aulacothorax orientalis (Konstantinov, 1995)
- Aulacothorax pahangi (Konstantinov, 1995)
- Aulacothorax parkeri (B. White, 1942)
- Aulacothorax rangoonensis (Konstantinov, 1995)
- Aulacothorax rata (Takizawa, 2017)
- Aulacothorax recticollis (J. L. LeConte, 1861)
- Aulacothorax sabahcola (Takizawa, 2017)
- Aulacothorax schereri (Takizawa, 2017)
- Aulacothorax syzygium (Prathapan & Konstantinov, 2013)
- Aulacothorax terminalia (Prathapan & Konstantinov, 2013)
- Aulacothorax tuberculatus (Takizawa, 2017)
- Aulacothorax visayanensis (Konstantinov, 1995)
