= Clidicus =

Clidicus may refer to:

- Clidicus (genus), a rove beetle genus
- Clidicus (Archon), an Archon of Athens from 733 BC to 723 BC
