= Ektatotricha =

Ektatotricha Temporal range: Late Aptian to Early Cenomanian

Scientific classification
- Kingdom: Animalia
- Phylum: Arthropoda
- Clade: Pancrustacea
- Class: Insecta
- Order: Coleoptera
- Suborder: Polyphaga
- Infraorder: Staphyliniformia
- Family: Staphylinidae
- Subfamily: Scydmaeninae
- Supertribe: †Hapsomelitae
- Genus: †Ektatotricha; Chatzimanolis, Engel & Newton, 2010
- Species: †E. paradoxa

Binomial name
- †Ektatotricha paradoxa Chatzimanolis, Engel & Newton, 2010

Extinct genus of beetles

Ektatotricha is an extinct, monotypic, genus of ant-like stone beetle in the family Staphylinidae containing the single species Ektatotricha paradoxa.

The genus is known from a total of 15 specimens in amber from amber deposits near Tanai Village 105 kilometres (65 mi) northwest of Myitkyina in the Kachin region of Myanmar. Burmese amber has been radiometrically dated using U-Pb isotopes, yielding an age of approximately 99 million years old, close to the Aptian – Cenomanian boundary. The holotype, a single, complete adult with specimen number "AMNH Bu-1464", and six of the paratypes are now deposited in the American Museum of Natural History. Four more of the paratypes are deposited in the University of Kansas Natural History Museum collections in Lawrence, Kansas, USA. The remaining two paratype specimens are currently in a private collection, but are to be deposited in the Field Museum of Natural History, Chicago. In addition to the holotype and 12 paratypes, two other American Museum of Natural History specimens were examined as part of the study; however, they were not designated as type material.

== Background ==
The known Ektatotricha specimens were first studied by Drs Stylianos Chatzimanolis of the University of Tennessee, Michael Engel of the University of Kansas, and Alfred Newton of the Field Museum. Chatzimanolis, Engel and Newton published the 2010 type description for E. paradoxa in the journal Cretaceous Research, Volume 31.

The genus name is a feminine combination of the Greek ektatos, meaning "extended", which refers to the visible fifth and sixth abdominal sterna, and tricha meaning "hair". The species name paradoxa is from the Greek paradoxon, meaning "riddle".

== Description ==
The beetles are small, being between 0.65 to 0.85 millimetres (0.026 to 0.033 in) long. Their bodies are brown to reddish brown in color and have a dense covering of hairs which are notably long. Because the fifth and sixth abdominal sterna are extended, and thus visible, the genus has been placed in the Scydmaeninae, supertribe Hapsomelitae.

Ektatotricha differs from the other member of the supertribe, Hapsomela, by having maxillary palpi which are almost equal in length, a different antenna shape, and by the depth of the punctures on the fore wings. Like Hapsomela, the protibia of Ektatotricha have a well-developed hook, which may have been used in mating or male-male combat between rivals. It has also been suggested that the hooks may have been used to capture prey.
