= Mastigini =

Scientific classification
- Kingdom: Animalia
- Phylum: Arthropoda
- Clade: Pancrustacea
- Class: Insecta
- Order: Coleoptera
- Suborder: Polyphaga
- Infraorder: Staphyliniformia
- Family: Staphylinidae
- Subfamily: Scydmaeninae
- Supertribe: Mastigitae
- Tribe: Mastigini; Fleming, 1821

Mastigini is a tribe of rove beetles in the supertribe Mastigitae. It was first described by Fleming in 1821. It contains 4 genera and 38 species.

== Genera ==
- Clidicostigus
- Mastigus
- Palaeostigus
- Stenomastigus
