= Leptochromini =

Scientific classification
- Kingdom: Animalia
- Phylum: Arthropoda
- Clade: Pancrustacea
- Class: Insecta
- Order: Coleoptera
- Suborder: Polyphaga
- Infraorder: Staphyliniformia
- Family: Staphylinidae
- Subfamily: Scydmaeninae
- Supertribe: Mastigitae
- Tribe: Leptochromini; Jałoszyński & Brunke, 2018

Tribe of beetles

Leptochromini is a tribe of rove beetles in the supertribe Mastigitae. It was first described by Jałoszyński and Brunke in 2018. It contains 3 genera with 11 species.

== Genera and species ==
- Euroleptochromus
  - Euroleptochromus sabathi
  - Euroleptochromus setifer
  - Euroleptochromus tuberculatus
- Leptochromus
  - Leptochromus agilis
  - Leptochromus bicolor
  - Leptochromus fulvescens
  - Leptochromus laselva
  - Leptochromus mexicanus
  - Leptochromus palaeomexicanus
- Rovnoleptochromus
  - Rovnoleptochromus ableptonoides
  - Rovnoleptochromus balticus
