= Scydmaenini =

Scientific classification
- Kingdom: Animalia
- Phylum: Arthropoda
- Clade: Pancrustacea
- Class: Insecta
- Order: Coleoptera
- Suborder: Polyphaga
- Infraorder: Staphyliniformia
- Family: Staphylinidae
- Subfamily: Scydmaeninae
- Supertribe: Scydmaenitae
- Tribe: Scydmaenini; Leach, 1815

Tribe of beetles

Scydmaenini is a tribe of rove beetles in the supertribe Scydmaenitae. It was first described by Leach in 1815. It contains 8 genera with 800 accepted species. Recorded observations of members of Scydmaenini have primarily been made in Sweden, Poland, the United Kingdom, Finland, Australia, Germany, and Mexico.

== Genera ==
- Adrastia
- Blefuscudia
- Ceramphis
- Eudesis
- Kuafu
- Liliputella
- Pseudoeudesis
- Scymaenus
