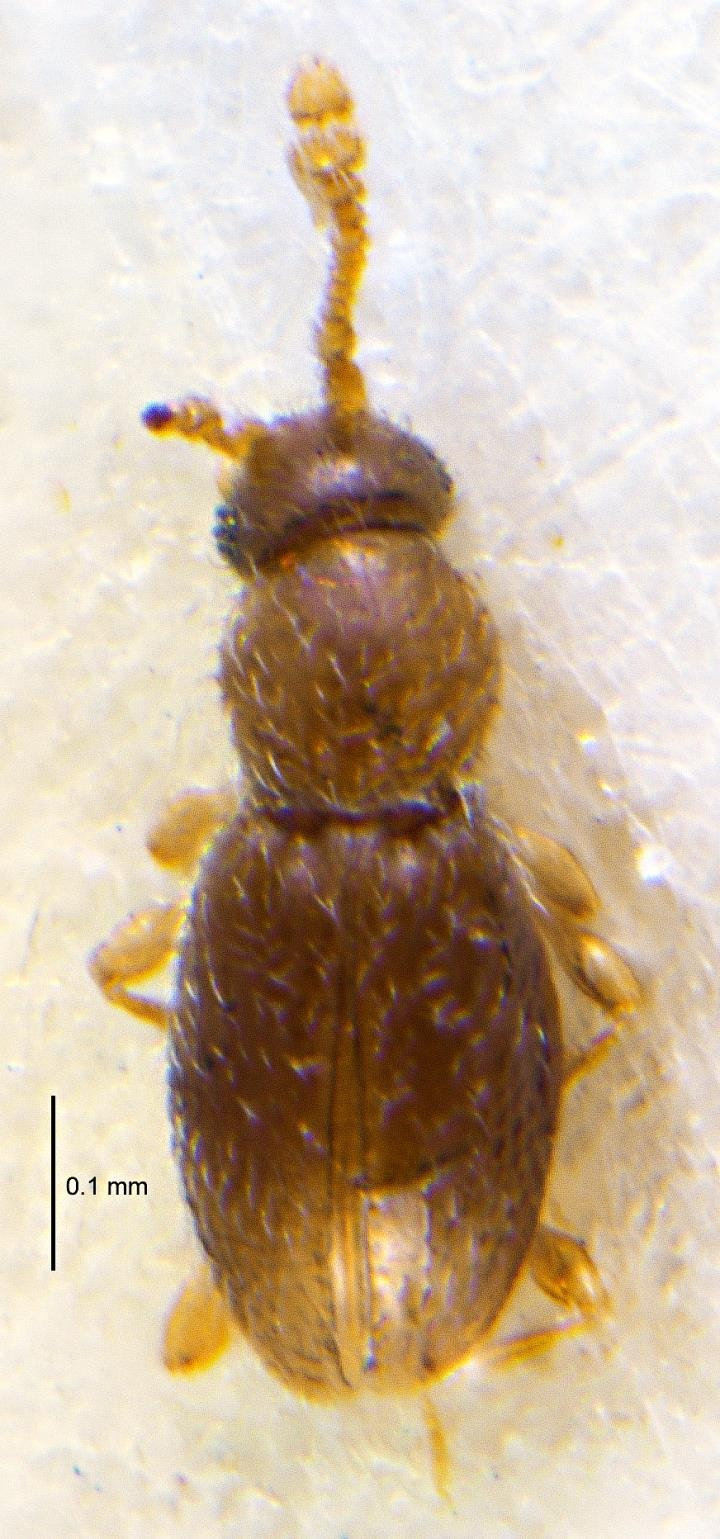
- Holotype of Microscydmus lynfieldi from the New Zealand Arthropod Collection

Scientific classification
- Kingdom: Animalia
- Phylum: Arthropoda
- Clade: Pancrustacea
- Class: Insecta
- Order: Coleoptera
- Suborder: Polyphaga
- Infraorder: Staphyliniformia
- Family: Staphylinidae
- Genus: Microscydmus
- Species: M. lynfieldi

Binomial name
- Microscydmus lynfieldi Franz, 1977
- Distribution map

Synonyms
- Microscydmus omahutensis Franz, 1977

= Microscydmus lynfieldi =

Species of beetle

Microscydmus lynfieldi is a species of minute beetle belonging to the family Scydmaeninae. First discovered in the Auckland suburb of Lynfield in 1975 and described in 1977, it is endemic to New Zealand. M. lynfieldi is one of the smallest known species of beetle.

== Taxonomy ==
The species was described by Austrian entomologist Herbert Franz in 1977, based on holotypes collected from decaying māhoe wood by Guillermo Kuschel from the vicinity of the Wairaki Stream / Tropicana Drive in Lynfield, Auckland, New Zealand in 1975. The species was named after its type locality of Lynfield. In 1990, Microscydmus omahutensis, also found at Lynfield and described by Franz in 1977, was synonymised with M. lynfieldi by Kuschel.

== Description ==
The species has an average length of 0.55 mm (0.022 in), and is a light reddish brown colour. It is recognisable by its broad head, large eyes and a pronotum of approximate equal length and width.

== Distribution ==
The species is endemic to New Zealand. By the 1990s, verified sightings of the species had only been made in Lynfield, Auckland, with an unconfirmed sighting in 2010 at Port Waikato.
