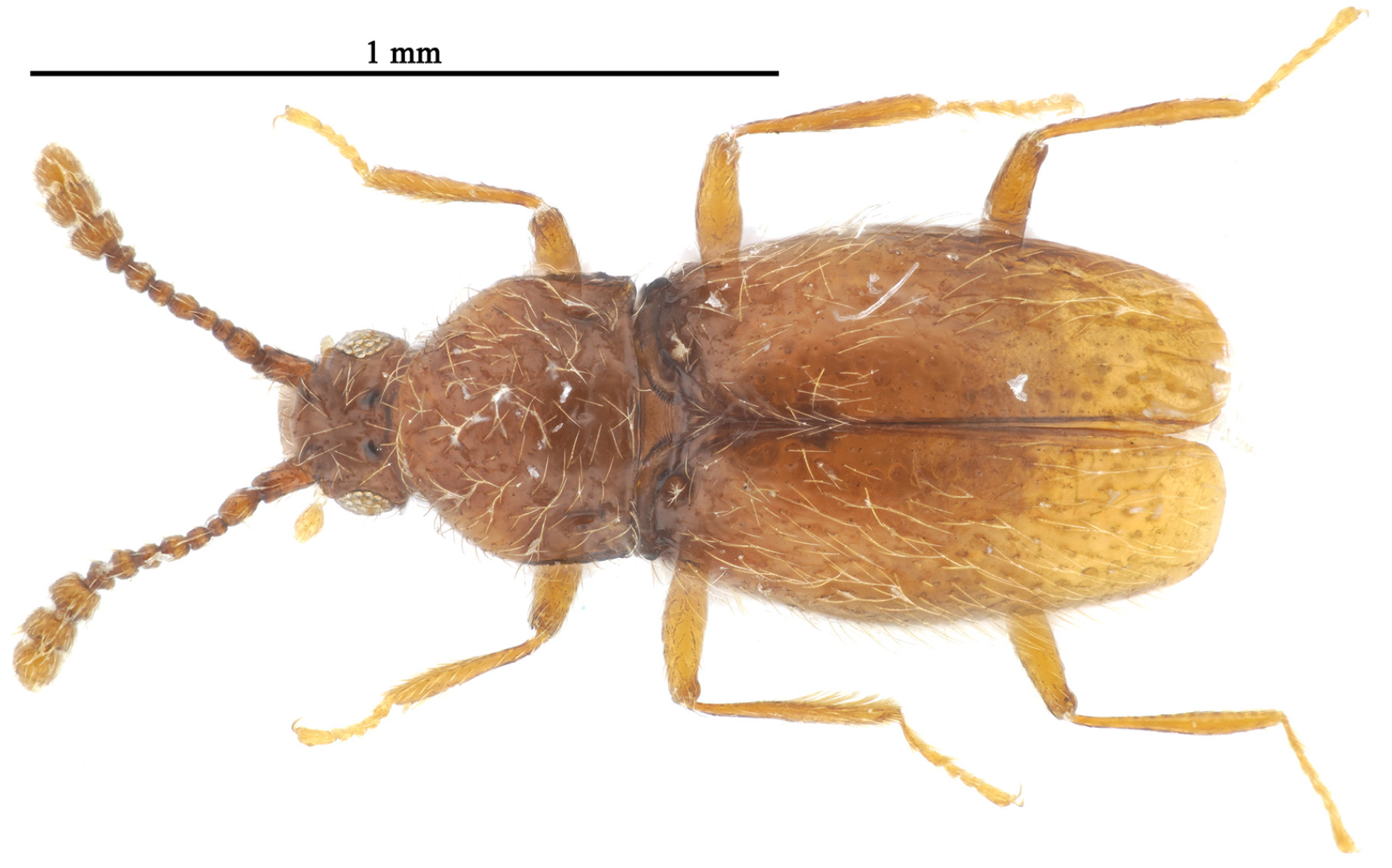
- Veraphis odaesanensis, male habitus

Scientific classification
- Kingdom: Animalia
- Phylum: Arthropoda
- Class: Insecta
- Order: Coleoptera
- Suborder: Polyphaga
- Infraorder: Staphyliniformia
- Family: Staphylinidae
- Tribe: Eutheiini
- Genus: Veraphis; Casey, 1897

= Veraphis =

Genus of beetles

Veraphis is a genus of beetles belonging to the family Staphylinidae.

The species of this genus are found in Northern Europe.

Species:

- Veraphis assingi Jałoszyński, 2013
- Veraphis calcarifer Jałoszyński, 2012
