= Cephenniitae =

Scientific classification
- Kingdom: Animalia
- Phylum: Arthropoda
- Class: Insecta
- Order: Coleoptera
- Suborder: Polyphaga
- Infraorder: Staphyliniformia
- Family: Staphylinidae
- Subfamily: Scydmaeninae
- Supertribe: Cephenniitae; Reitter, 1882

Subfamily of beetles

Cephenniitae is a supertribe of beetles belonging to the family Staphylinidae.

Tribes:

- Cephenniini Reitter, 1882
- Eutheiini Casey, 1897
- Marcepaniini Jałoszyński, 2013
