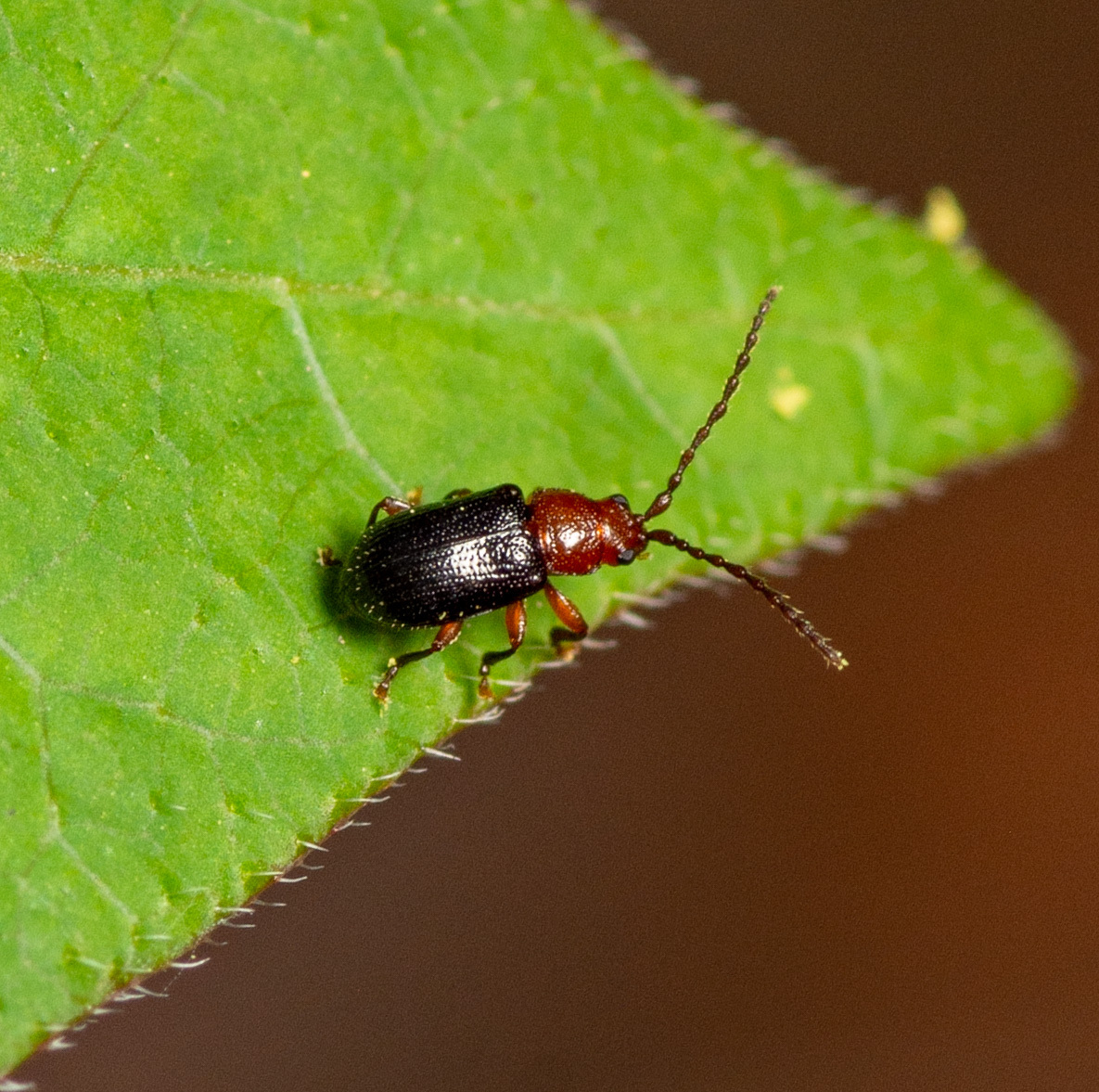
- Aulacothorax copalinus, United States

Scientific classification
- Kingdom: Animalia
- Phylum: Arthropoda
- Class: Insecta
- Order: Coleoptera
- Suborder: Polyphaga
- Infraorder: Cucujiformia
- Family: Chrysomelidae
- Subfamily: Galerucinae
- Tribe: Serraticollini
- Genus: Aulacothorax
- Species: A. copalinus

Binomial name
- Aulacothorax copalinus (Fabricius, 1801)

= Aulacothorax copalinus =

Species of beetle

Aulacothorax copalinus is a species of leaf beetle in the family Chrysomelidae, and formerly placed in the genus Orthaltica. It is found in North America.
