= Clidicus (beetle) =

Scientific classification
- Domain: Eukaryota
- Kingdom: Animalia
- Phylum: Arthropoda
- Class: Insecta
- Order: Coleoptera
- Suborder: Polyphaga
- Infraorder: Staphyliniformia
- Family: Staphylinidae
- Subfamily: Scydmaeninae
- Supertribe: Mastigitae
- Tribe: Clidicini
- Genus: Clidicus; Laporte, 1832

Type species
- Clidicus grandis Laporte, 1832

Synonyms
- Cretoleptochromus Cai, Chenyang & Diying Huang, 2016; Erineus Walker, 1858

Genus of beetles

Clidicus is a genus of rove beetles in the family Staphylinidae. They are found in South and Southeast Asia, and Australia.

== Species ==
These 39 species belong to the genus Clidicus:

- Clidicus abbotensis O'Keefe, 2000 (Australia)
- Clidicus aliquantulus Jałoszyński, Hlaváč & Nomura, 2003 (Vietnam)
- Clidicus armipes Orousset, 2014 (Malaysia (Sabah))
- Clidicus asymmetricus Jałoszyński, 2018 (Philippines (Mindanao))
- Clidicus bellator Jałoszyński, Hlaváč & Nomura, 2003 (Vietnam)
- Clidicus beroni Orousset, 2014 (Vietnam)
- Clidicus bicorniger Orousset, 2014 (Malaysia (Sabah))
- Clidicus bidens Orousset, 2014 (Malaysia (Sabah))
- Clidicus chinensis Zhou, De-Yao & Li-Zhen Li, 2015 (China (Hainan))
- Clidicus crocodylus Jałoszyński, 2009 (Philippines (Luzon, Mindanao))
- Clidicus dohertyi Orousset, 2014 (Indonesia (Kalimantan))
- Clidicus doriae Schaufuss, L. W., 1884 (Indonesia (Sumatra))
- Clidicus forceps Cheng, Zhi-Fei, Zi-Wei Yin & Jałoszyński, 2019 (Philippines (Mindanao))
- Clidicus formicarius Pascoe, 1863 (Malaysia (Sabah, Sarawak), Indonesia (Kalimantan; Java, Sumatra in error))
- Clidicus ganglbaueri Reitter, 1887 (Indonesia (Java, Sumatra))
- Clidicus gracilipes Orousset, 2014 (Indonesia (Sumatra))
- Clidicus grandis Laporte de Castelnau, 1832 (Indonesia (Java; Borneo in error))
- Clidicus interfector Jałoszyński, Zhi-Fei Cheng & Zi-Wei Yin., 2019 (Philippines (Mindanao))
- Clidicus kalis Jałoszyński, Zhi-Fei Cheng & Zi-Wei Yin., 2019 (Philippines (Luzon, Mindanao))
- Clidicus laticeps Pic, 1928 (India (Tamil Nadu))
- Clidicus loebli Besuchet, 1971 (Sri Lanka)
- Clidicus mawarensis Jałoszyński, 2020 (Malaysia (Sabah))
- Clidicus mendax Orousset, 2014 (Malaysia (Sarawak))
- Clidicus minilankanus Jałoszyński, 2020 (Sri Lanka)
- Clidicus minutus Orousset, 2014 (Indonesia (Sumatra))
- Clidicus monstrosus (Walker, 1858) (Sri Lanka)
- Clidicus mussardi Besuchet, 1971 (Sri Lanka)
- Clidicus mysorensis Lhoste, 1939 (India (Mysore))
- Clidicus occisor Jałoszyński, 2019 (Philippines (Mindanao))
- Clidicus omoios Jałoszyński, Hlaváč & Nomura, 2003 (Laos, Vietnam)
- Clidicus qiuae Cheng, Zhi-Fei & Zi-Wei Yin, 2019 (China (Yunnan))
- Clidicus quadricollis Besuchet, 1971 (Sri Lanka)
- Clidicus rufescens Jałoszyński, Hlaváč & Nomura, 2003 (Vietnam)
- Clidicus shavrini Jałoszyński, 2019 (Philippines)
- Clidicus termitophilus Lhoste, 1939 (Malaysia (Sarawak))
- Clidicus tonkinensis Lhoste, 1937 (Vietnam)
- Clidicus yingjiangus Cheng, Zhi-Fei & Zi-Wei Yin, 2019 (China (Yunnan))
- † Clidicus archaicus (Cai, Chenyang & Diying Huang, 2016) (Myanmar [Cretaceous amber])
- † Clidicus burmiticus (Yin, Ziwei, Chenyang Cai, Diying Huang & Lizhen Li, 2017) (Myanmar [Cretaceous amber])
