= Chevrolatiini =

Scientific classification
- Kingdom: Animalia
- Phylum: Arthropoda
- Clade: Pancrustacea
- Class: Insecta
- Order: Coleoptera
- Suborder: Polyphaga
- Infraorder: Staphyliniformia
- Family: Staphylinidae
- Supertribe: Scydmaenitae
- Tribe: Chevrolatiini; Reitter, 1882

Tribe of beetle

Chevrolatiini is a tribe of rove beetles in the supertribe Scydmaenitae. It was first described by Reitter in 1882. It contains one genus, Chevrolatia, with 19 accepted species.

== Species ==
- Chevrolatia amoena
- Chevrolatia besucheti
- Chevrolatia breviceps
- Chevrolatia celisi
- Chevrolatia egregia
- Chevrolatia endroedyi
- Chevrolatia franzi
- Chevrolatia grouvellei
- Chevrolatia hispanica
- Chevrolatia iberica
- Chevrolatia insignis
- Chevrolatia leleupi
- Chevrolatia maroccana
- Chevrolatia microphthalma
- Chevrolatia occiedeentalis
- Chevrolatia pici
- Chevrolatia raymondi
- Chevrolatia suteri
- Chevrolatia sylvanica
