= Aulacothorax recticollis =

Scientific classification
- Kingdom: Animalia
- Phylum: Arthropoda
- Class: Insecta
- Order: Coleoptera
- Suborder: Polyphaga
- Infraorder: Cucujiformia
- Family: Chrysomelidae
- Subfamily: Galerucinae
- Tribe: Serraticollini
- Genus: Aulacothorax
- Species: A. recticollis

Binomial name
- Aulacothorax recticollis (J. L. LeConte, 1861)

Species of beetle

Aulacothorax recticollis is a species of leaf beetle in the family Chrysomelidae, formerly in the genus Orthaltica. It is found in Central America and North America.
