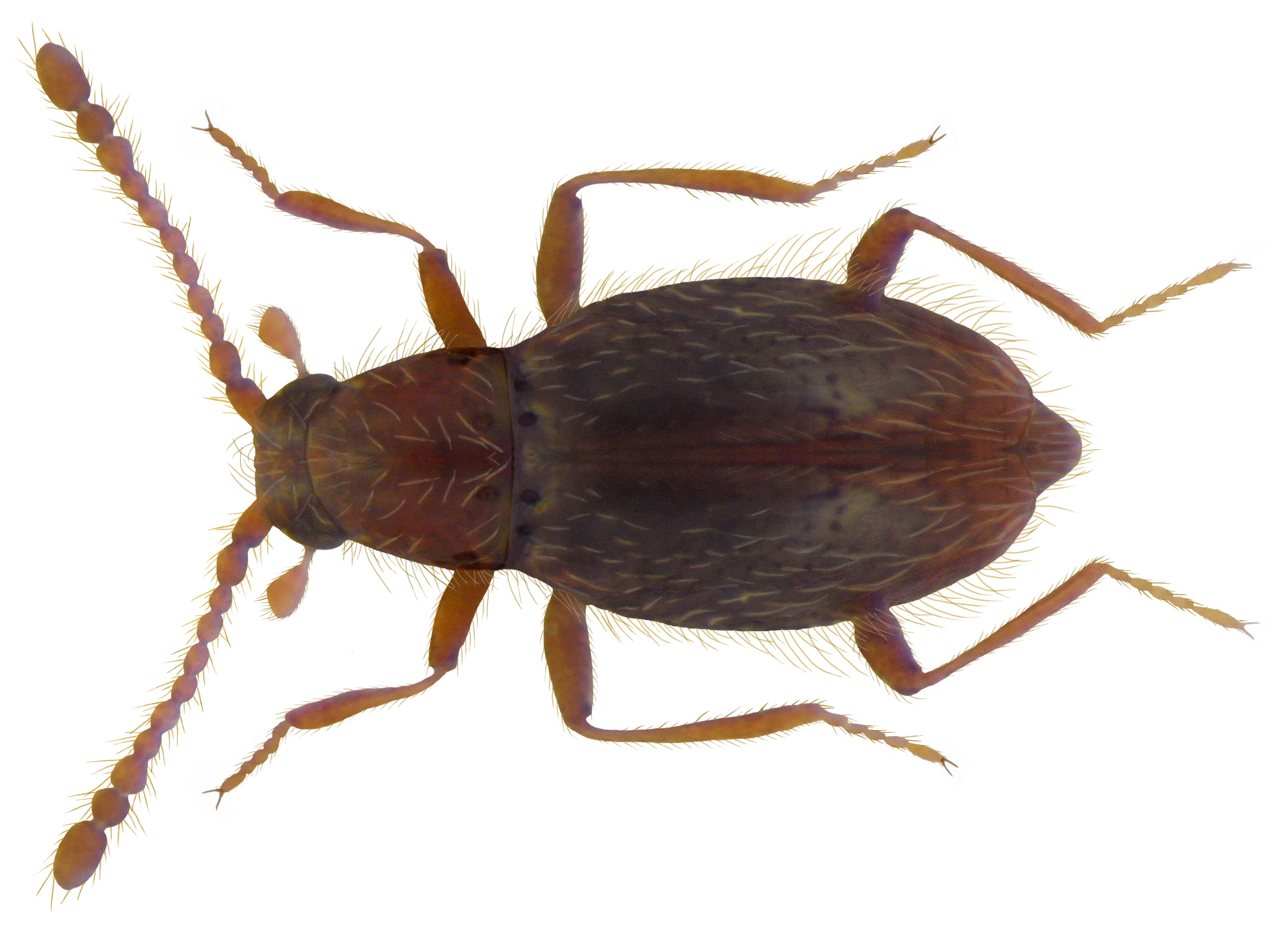

Scientific classification
- Kingdom: Animalia
- Phylum: Arthropoda
- Class: Insecta
- Order: Coleoptera
- Suborder: Polyphaga
- Infraorder: Staphyliniformia
- Family: Staphylinidae
- Tribe: Eutheiini
- Genus: Euthiconus; Reitter, 1882

= Euthiconus =

Genus of beetles

Euthiconus is a genus of beetles belonging to the family Staphylinidae.

The species of this genus are found in Europe and Northern America.

Species:

- Euthiconus conicicollis (Fairmaire & Laboulbène, 1855)
- Euthiconus latus (Brendel, 1893)
- Euthiconus lustrificus Kurbatov, 1990
- Euthiconus nopporoensis Jałoszyński, 2019
- Euthiconus tener (Casey, 1897)
