= Electroatopos =

Electroatopos Temporal range: Cretaceous

Scientific classification
- Kingdom: Animalia
- Phylum: Arthropoda
- Clade: Pancrustacea
- Class: Insecta
- Order: Coleoptera
- Suborder: Polyphaga
- Infraorder: Staphyliniformia
- Family: Staphylinidae
- Subfamily: Scydmaeninae
- Supertribe: †Hapsomelitae
- Genus: †Electroatopos; Chatzimanolis, Engel & Newton, 2010
- Species: †E. castaneus

Binomial name
- †Electroatopos castaneus Chatzimanolis, Engel & Newton, 2010

Genus of beetles

Electroatopos castaneus is an extinct species of ant-like stone beetle, described in 2010, and the only species in the genus Electroatopos. It existed in what is now Myanmar during the Middle Cretaceous period.
