= Clidicini =

Scientific classification
- Kingdom: Animalia
- Phylum: Arthropoda
- Clade: Pancrustacea
- Class: Insecta
- Order: Coleoptera
- Suborder: Polyphaga
- Infraorder: Staphyliniformia
- Family: Staphylinidae
- Supertribe: Mastigitae
- Tribe: Clidicini; Casey, 1897

Clidicini is a tribe of rove beetles in the supertribe Mastigitae. It was first described by Casey in 1897. It contains 3 genera and 41 species.

== Genera ==
- Aenictosoma
- Clidicus
- Palaeoleptochromus
