= Mastigitae =

Scientific classification
- Kingdom: Animalia
- Phylum: Arthropoda
- Clade: Pancrustacea
- Class: Insecta
- Order: Coleoptera
- Suborder: Polyphaga
- Infraorder: Staphyliniformia
- Family: Staphylinidae
- Subfamily: Scydmaeninae
- Supertribe: Mastigitae; Fleming, 1821

Tribe of beetles

Mastigitae is a supertribe of rove beetles in the subfamily Scydmaeninae. It was first described by Fleming in 1821. It contains 6 tribes with 16 genera, and 137 species.

== Tribes and genera ==
- Baltostigini
  - Baltostigus
- Clidicini
  - Aenictosoma
  - Clidicus
  - Palaeoleptochromus
- Leptochromini
  - Euroleptochromus
  - Leptochromus
  - Rovnoleptochromus
- Leptomastacini
  - Ablepton
  - Achremastax
  - Leptomastax
  - Taurablepton
- Mastigini
  - Clidicostigus
  - Mastigus
  - Palaeostigus
  - Stenomastigus
- Papusini
  - Papusus
- Archemastax (genus not under a tribe)
