= Aulacothorax melinus =

Scientific classification
- Kingdom: Animalia
- Phylum: Arthropoda
- Class: Insecta
- Order: Coleoptera
- Suborder: Polyphaga
- Infraorder: Cucujiformia
- Family: Chrysomelidae
- Subfamily: Galerucinae
- Tribe: Serraticollini
- Genus: Aulacothorax
- Species: A. melinus

Binomial name
- Aulacothorax melinus (Horn, 1889)

Species of beetle

Aulacothorax melinus, the poison ivy leaf beetle, is a species of leaf beetle in the family Chrysomelidae, formerly in the genus Orthaltica. It is found in North America.
