= Lynfield, New Zealand =

Lynfield
- Suburb
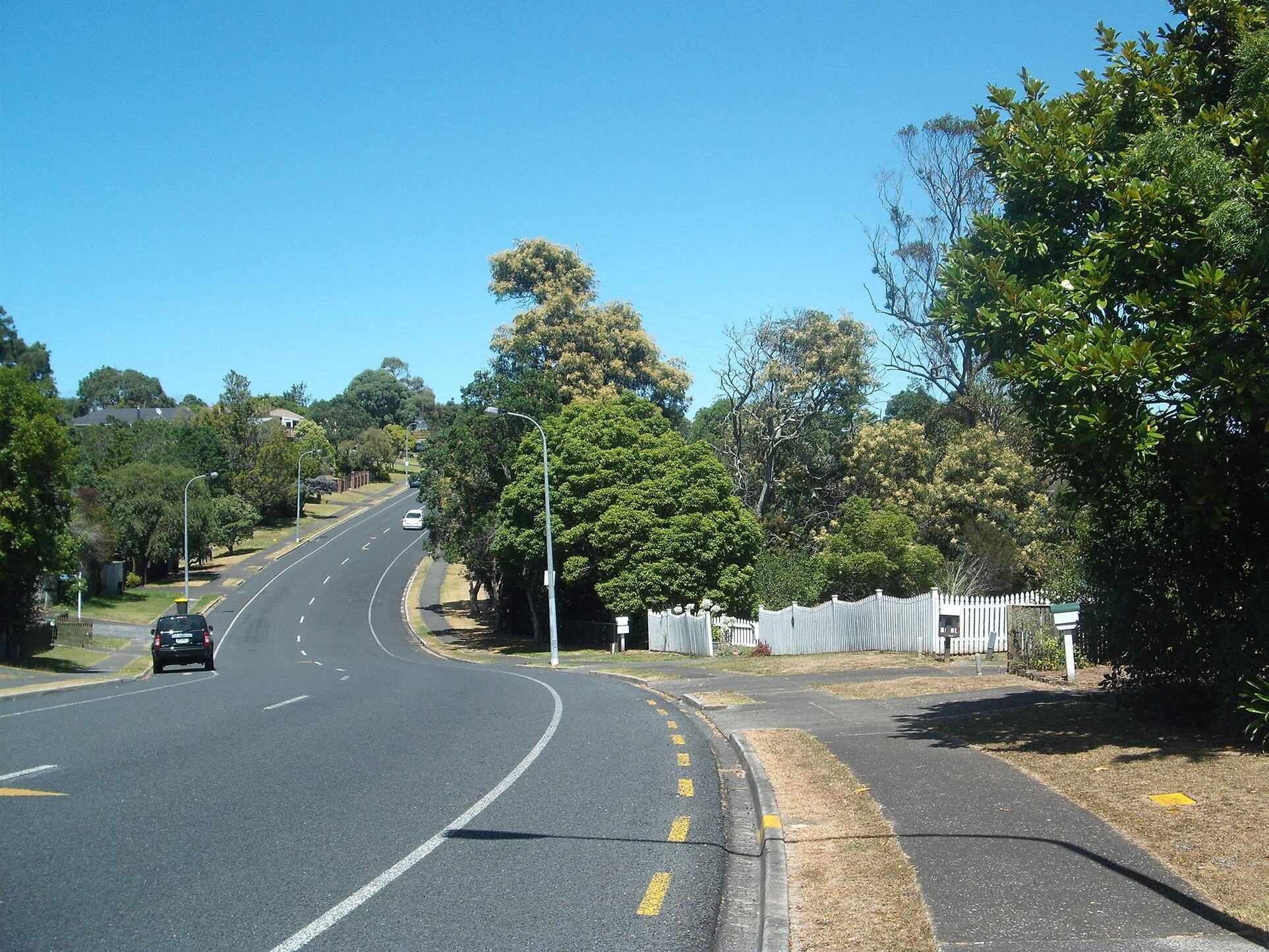
- Halsey Drive in Lynfield
- Interactive map of Lynfield
- Coordinates: 36.927109°S 174.722412°E
- Country: New Zealand
- City: Auckland
- Local authority: Auckland Council
- Electoral ward: Albert-Eden-Puketāpapa ward
- Local board: Puketāpapa Local Board

Area
  - Land: 252 ha (620 acres)

Population (June 2025)
  - Total: 8,830
  - Density: 3,500/km^{2} (9,080/sq mi)

New Windsor	Mount Roskill	Mount Roskill
Blockhouse Bay	Lynfield	Waikōwhai
(Manukau Harbour)	(Manukau Harbour)	(Manukau Harbour)

Lynfield is a suburb of Auckland, New Zealand. It is under the local governance of Auckland Council. The suburb is located on the southwestern Auckland isthmus bordering the Manukau Harbour, much of which is densely forested with native forest. Lynfield was developed for suburban housing in the late 1950s and 1960s, modelled after American-style suburbs.

== Etymology ==
Lynfield was the name of Albert William Irvine's farm. Irvine named the farm after Lindfield, New South Wales, which was the birthplace of his wife. Before Lynfield College opened in 1958, parents and teachers chose the name Lynfield, due to the Linfield poultry farm, owned by, adjacent to the school grounds. The college's name was adopted for the modern suburb, which developed south of the school.

== Geography ==
Lynfield is a peninsula of the southern Auckland isthmus bounded by the Manukau Harbour. It is bordered by Lynfield Cove in the west and Wattle Bay in the east.

The Wairaki Stream (also known as Duck Creek) flows through Lynfield, entering the Manukau Harbour at Lynfield Cove.

== History ==
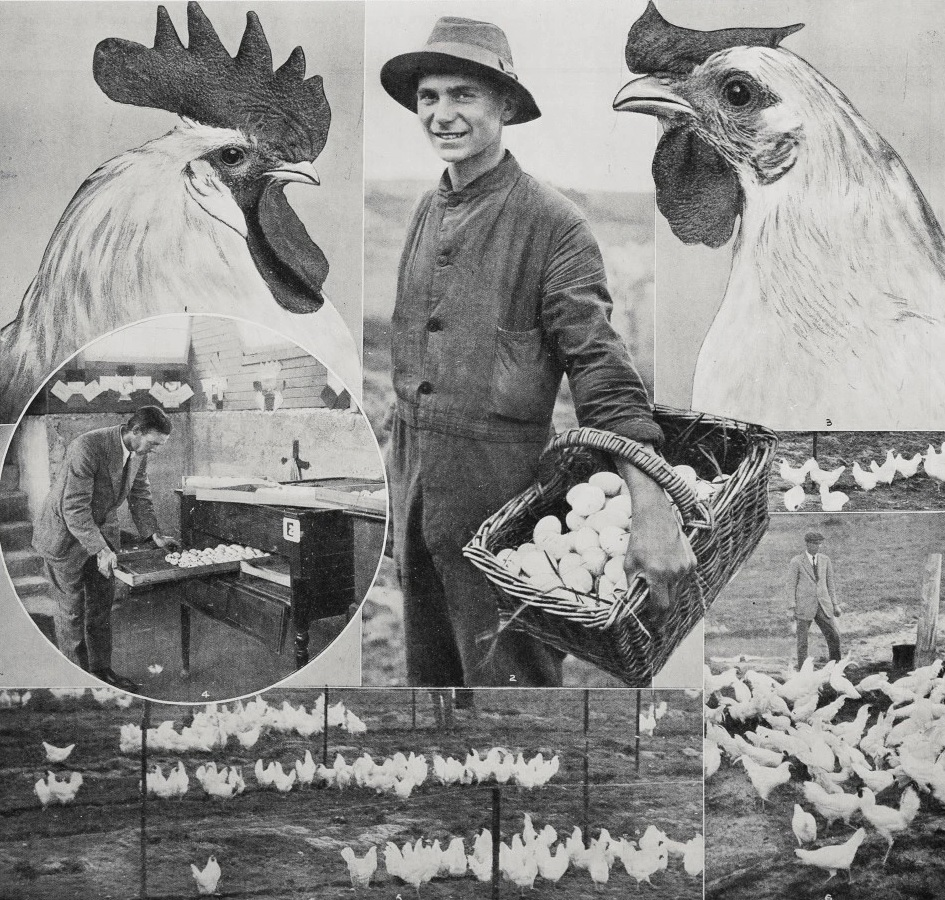
Scenes from the Linfield poultry farm in the 1910s

The area has been settled by Tāmaki Māori iwi hapū and since at least the 13th century. By the early 18th century, the area was within the rohe of Waiohua. After the defeat of Kiwi Tāmaki, the paramount chief of the iwi, the area became part of the rohe of Ngāti Whātua (modern-day Ngāti Whātua Ōrākei).

In 1910 Sir Alfred Bankart purchased an allotment of land between White Swan Road and the Wairaki Stream, naming his purchase the Gilletta Estate, and subdividing the area between 1919 and 1922. In 1913 farmer Albert William Irvine moved Linfield Poultry Farm from Pah Road in Epsom to the estate, after needing to upscale his business. By the next year, Irvine had moved the farm north to Boundary Road in Mount Roskill, but the name remained associated with the modern-day area.

In 1911, the Crown endowed the land to the Auckland Harbour Board, who developed the area into suburban housing in the late 1950s and 1960s. Town planner Robert Terence Kennedy was consulted to develop the suburb, who modelled the area after American-style suburbs. The area features one major road, Halsey Drive, which winds around the development. The suburb is bisected by the Avenue, which was developed as a Parisian-style boulevard. The developers chose to name the streets after luxury cruise liners that stopped in Auckland.

The Auckland Harbour Board initially offered the houses as rental properties, available on 21-year leases. Residents protested their lack of ability to purchase their homes, and in 1968 presented a 150-member petition to the Harbour Board. In 1974, the board agreed to let residents purchase their properties, due to the harbour board experiencing a shortage of funds.

The suburb's first shop was a Four Square which opened in 1965. Suburban housing continued to be built in the area until the late 1970s.

Microscydmus lynfieldi, one of the smallest beetle species in the world, was discovered at the Wairaki Stream in Lynfield in 1975.

== Demographics ==
Lynfield covers 2.52 km^{2} (0.97 sq mi) and had an estimated population of 8,830 as of June 2025, with a population density of 3,504 people per km^{2}.

Historical population
Year	Pop.	±% p.a.
2006	6,570	—
2013	6,765	+0.42%
2018	7,503	+2.09%
2023	7,866	+0.95%

Lynfield had a population of 7,866 in the 2023 New Zealand census, an increase of 363 people (4.8%) since the 2018 census, and an increase of 1,101 people (16.3%) since the 2013 census. There were 3,888 males, 3,954 females and 24 people of other genders in 2,451 dwellings. 2.7% of people identified as LGBTIQ+. The median age was 38.0 years (compared with 38.1 years nationally). There were 1,281 people (16.3%) aged under 15 years, 1,641 (20.9%) aged 15 to 29, 3,579 (45.5%) aged 30 to 64, and 1,362 (17.3%) aged 65 or older.

People could identify as more than one ethnicity. The results were 30.8% European (Pākehā); 4.8% Māori; 8.9% Pasifika; 60.1% Asian; 3.1% Middle Eastern, Latin American and African New Zealanders (MELAA); and 1.8% other, which includes people giving their ethnicity as "New Zealander". English was spoken by 90.9%, Māori language by 0.8%, Samoan by 2.8%, and other languages by 43.9%. No language could be spoken by 2.3% (e.g. too young to talk). New Zealand Sign Language was known by 0.3%. The percentage of people born overseas was 56.4, compared with 28.8% nationally.

Religious affiliations were 31.1% Christian, 22.4% Hindu, 8.4% Islam, 0.2% Māori religious beliefs, 1.9% Buddhist, 0.2% New Age, and 2.7% other religions. People who answered that they had no religion were 27.7%, and 5.5% of people did not answer the census question.

Of those at least 15 years old, 2,529 (38.4%) people had a bachelor's or higher degree, 2,298 (34.9%) had a post-high school certificate or diploma, and 1,755 (26.7%) people exclusively held high school qualifications. The median income was $43,400, compared with $41,500 nationally. 831 people (12.6%) earned over $100,000 compared to 12.1% nationally. The employment status of those at least 15 was that 3,468 (52.7%) people were employed full-time, 729 (11.1%) were part-time, and 168 (2.6%) were unemployed.

Individual statistical areas
Name	Area (km^{2})	Population	Density (per km^{2})	Dwellings	Median age	Median income
Mount Roskill West	0.94	3,357	3,571	1,023	38.3 years	$39,000
Lynfield Central	0.72	2,790	3,875	879	35.6 years	$46,600
Lynfield Harbour View	0.85	1,719	2,022	552	40.7 years	$48,900
New Zealand					38.1 years	$41,500

== Landmarks and amenities ==
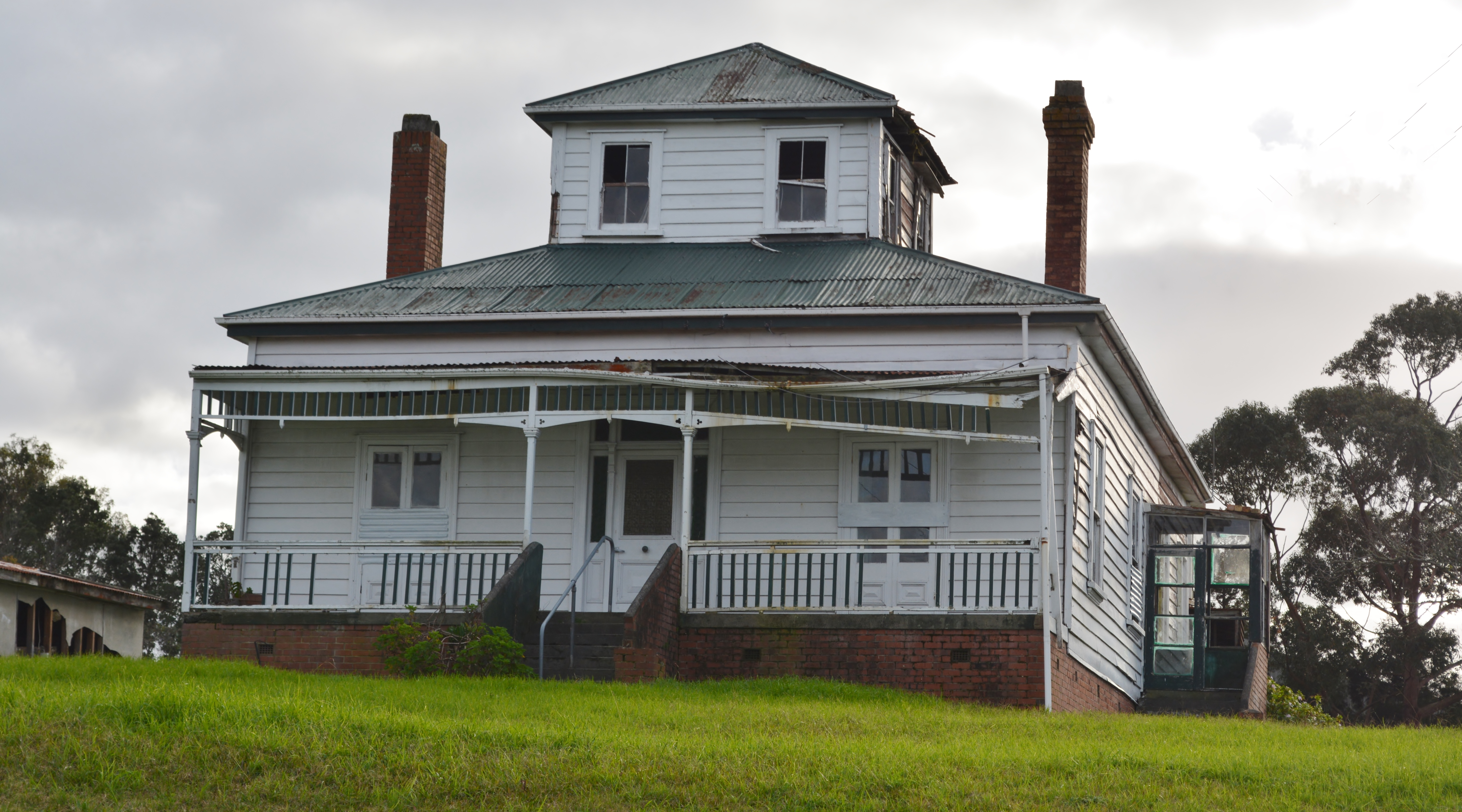
143 White Swan Road, a 1910s farmhouse which has since been developed as an early learning centre

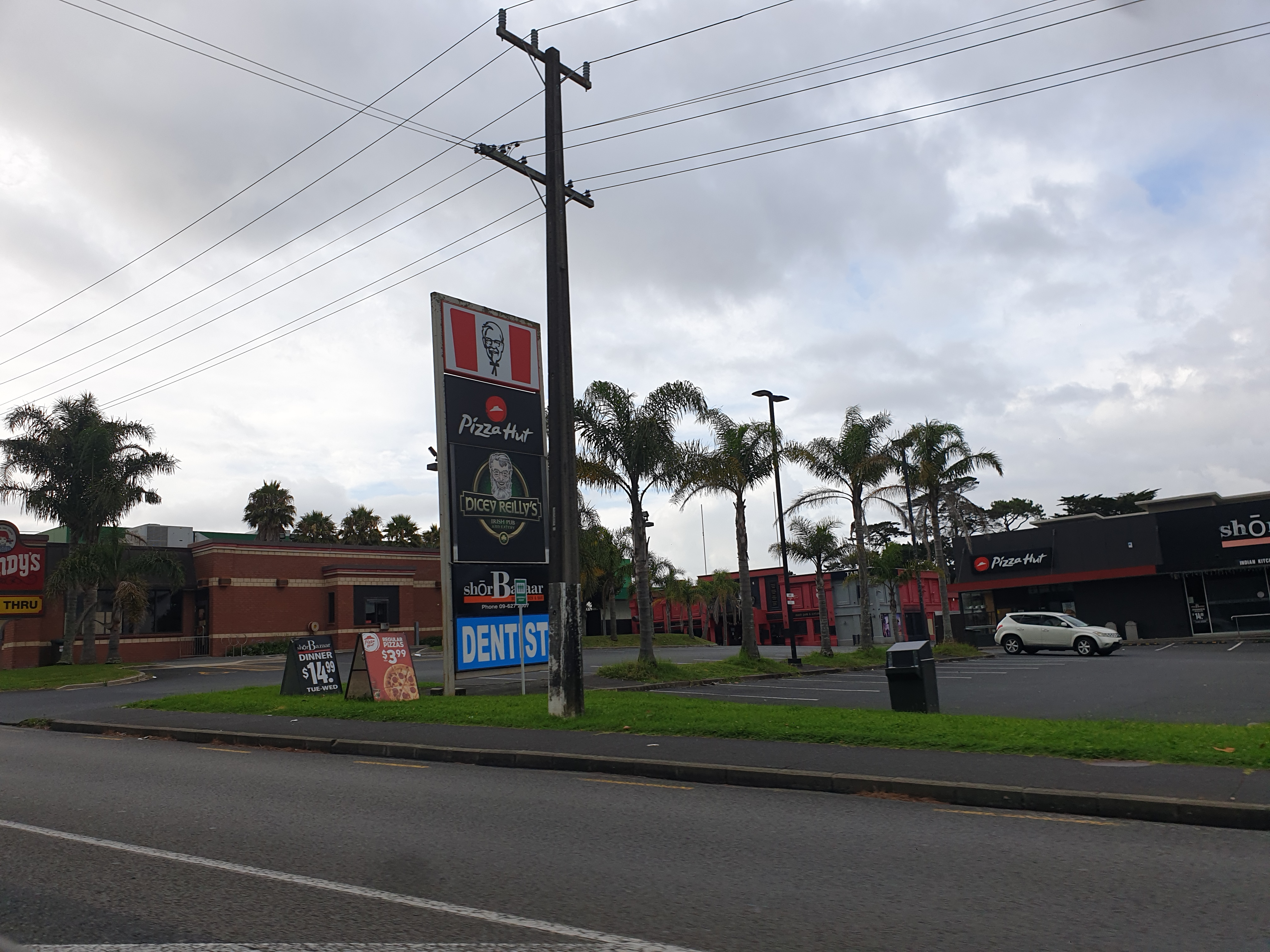
The Lynfield Shopping Centre

- 143 White Swan Road is a farmhouse built circa 1913, for Herbert William Brooks and Helen Brooks on the site of their pig farm, and one of the only remaining pre-1950s houses in the area. In 2017, an early learning centre opened on the site.
- Lynfield Community Church, which was established in 1967. In 2016, the church was the site of a protest in support of a large number of Indian students who were threatened with deportation.
- Lynfield Shopping Centre, a strip mall in Lynfield on the corner of Hillsborough Road and the Avenue.
- Lynfield Tennis Club, which opened in January 1972 in Oriana Reserve.
- Maungakiekie Golf Club is a large golf course that was established on Maungakiekie / One Tree Hill in 1909. The club moved from its location on the volcano in 1943, and opened at Lynfield in 1946.
- The Manukau Harbour coastline between Lynfield Cove and Wattle Bay. A series of nature reserves and parks border the coastline, including Lynfield Cove Reserve, Himalaya Reserve, Manukau Domain, Halsey Esplanade Reserve, Sylvania Crescent Esplanade Reserve and Wattle Bay Reserve. The Waikōwhai Walkway is a public walkway along the Manukau Harbou coastline, linking Lynfield Cove to Onehunga in the east.
- Opened Stone, a sculpture by Japanese artist Hiroaki Ueda, that was erected in 1972 in the Manukau Domain.
- The Wairaki Stream, a two-kilometre stream bordered by native forest. A local volunteer group, the Friends of Wairaki Stream (FOWS), was established in 2018 and undertakes conservation work on the stream.

== Education ==
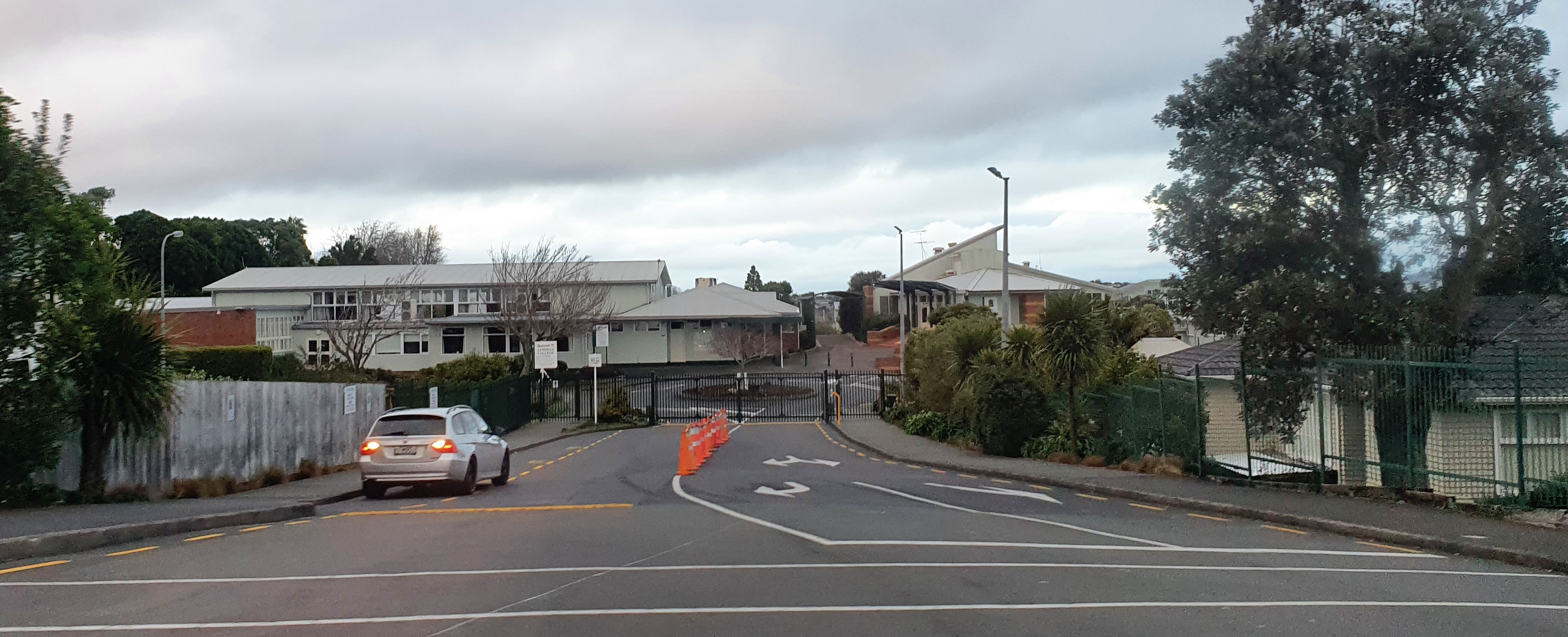
Lynfield College

Lynfield College is a secondary school for years 9–13 with a roll of 2,029. The school was established in 1958.

Halsey Drive School and Marshall Laing School are contributing primary schools for years 1–6 with rolls of 450 and 582 students, respectively. Marshall Laing School was established in 1962, and is named after the son of George Laing (of Laingholm), on the site of farmland previously owned by Marshall Laing. Halsey Drive School was established in 1968.

All these schools are coeducational. Rolls are as of March 2026.

== Notable residents ==
- Singer Daniel Bedingfield's family originates from Lynfield.
- Motor racing driver Mitch Evans lives in Lynfield with his family when he is not pursuing his career overseas.
- Housing developer and evangelist Bill Subritzky and his family lived in Lynfield from the 1960s until his death in 2015.

== Local government ==
The first local government in the area was the Mt Roskill Highway Board, that formed on 7 August 1868 to administer and fund the roads in the area. In 1883, the Highway Board became the Mt Roskill Road Board. The Lynfield area was a part of the Mt Roskill Borough between 1947 and 1989, after which it was amalgamated into Auckland City. On 1 November 2010, the Auckland Council was formed as a unitary authority governing the entire Auckland Region, and Wesley become a part of the Puketāpapa local board area, administered by the Puketāpapa Local Board. The Puketāpapa local board area forms a part of the Albert-Eden-Puketāpapa ward, which votes for two members of the Auckland Council. The Albert-Eden-Puketāpapa ward is represented by counsellors Christine Fletcher and Julie Fairey.

== Bibliography ==
- Reidy, Jade (2013). Not Just Passing Through: the Making of Mt Roskill (2nd ed.). Auckland: Puketāpapa Local Board. ISBN 978-1-927216-97-2. OCLC 889931177. Wikidata Q116775081.
