= Leptoscydmini =

Scientific classification
- Kingdom: Animalia
- Phylum: Arthropoda
- Clade: Pancrustacea
- Class: Insecta
- Order: Coleoptera
- Suborder: Polyphaga
- Infraorder: Staphyliniformia
- Family: Staphylinidae
- Supertribe: Scydmaenitae
- Tribe: Leptoscydmini; Casey, 1897

Tribe of beetle

Leptoscydmini is a tribe of rove beetles in the supertribe Scydmaenitae. It was first described by Casey in 1897. It contains one genus, Leptoscydmus, with two species, Leptoscydmus caseyi, and Leptscydmus cavifrons.
