= Marcepaniini =

Scientific classification
- Kingdom: Animalia
- Phylum: Arthropoda
- Clade: Pancrustacea
- Class: Insecta
- Order: Coleoptera
- Suborder: Polyphaga
- Infraorder: Staphyliniformia
- Family: Staphylinidae
- Tribe: Marcepaniini; Jałoszyński, 2013

Tribe of beetles

Marcepaniini is a tribe of rove beetles in the supertribe Cephenniitae. It was first described by Jałoszyński in 2013. It contains one genus, Marcepania, with 9 species.

== Species ==
- Marcepania daifuku
- Marcepania elongata
- Marcepania halva
- Marcepania krowka
- Marcepania minutissima
- Marcepania princesa
- Marcepania semengohensis
- Marcepania seramaensis
- Marcepania tuberculata
