= Hapsomelitae =

Scientific classification
- Kingdom: Animalia
- Phylum: Arthropoda
- Clade: Pancrustacea
- Class: Insecta
- Order: Coleoptera
- Suborder: Polyphaga
- Infraorder: Staphyliniformia
- Family: Staphylinidae
- Subfamily: Scydmaeninae
- Supertribe: †Hapsomelitae; Poinar & Brown, 2004

Extinct supertribe of beetles

Hapsomelitae is a supertribe of extinct rove beetles in the subfamily Scymaeninae. It was first described by Poinar and Brown in 2004. It contains three genera and five species. Recorded findings of members of Hapsomeliate have been made in Myanmar and China.

== Genera and species ==
- Ektatotricha
  - Ektatotricha paradoxa
- Electroatopos
  - Electratopos castaneus
- Hapsomela
  - Hapsomela burmitis
  - Hapsomela minor
  - Hapsomela tibialis
