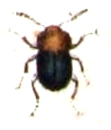
- Cephennium thoracicum

Scientific classification
- Kingdom: Animalia
- Phylum: Arthropoda
- Clade: Pancrustacea
- Class: Insecta
- Order: Coleoptera
- Suborder: Polyphaga
- Infraorder: Staphyliniformia
- Family: Staphylinidae
- Subfamily: Scydmaeninae
- Genus: Cephennium; Müller & Kunze, 1822

= Cephennium =

Genus of beetles

Cephennium is a genus of beetles belonging to the family Staphylinidae.

The genus was first described by Müller and Kunze in 1822.

The species of this genus are found in Europe and North America.

Species:

- Cephennium majus Reitter, 1882
