= Eutheiini =

Scientific classification
- Kingdom: Animalia
- Phylum: Arthropoda
- Clade: Pancrustacea
- Class: Insecta
- Order: Coleoptera
- Suborder: Polyphaga
- Infraorder: Staphyliniformia
- Family: Staphylinidae
- Supertribe: Cephenniitae
- Tribe: Eutheiini; Casey, 1897

Tribe of beetles

Eutheiini is a tribe of beetles belonging to the family Staphylinidae.

Genera:

- † Archeutheia Jałoszyński & Peris, 2016
- Eutheia Stephens, 1830
- Euthiconus Reitter, 1882
- Euthiopsis Müller, G., 1925
- Paeneutheia Jałoszyński, 2003
- Paraneseuthia Franz, 1986
- Veraphis Casey, 1897
- † Vertheia Jałoszyński & Perkovsky, 2016
