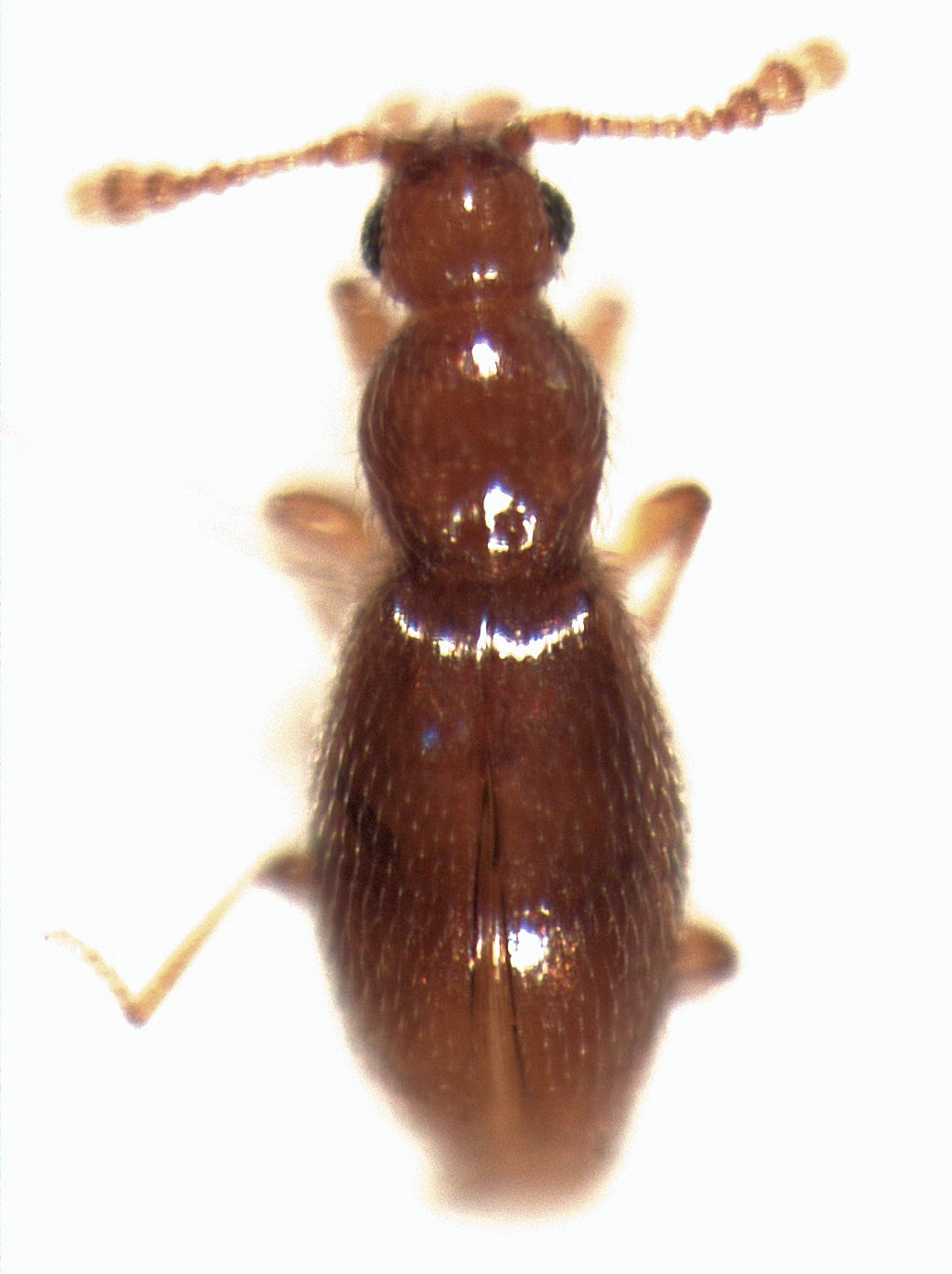

Scientific classification
- Domain: Eukaryota
- Kingdom: Animalia
- Phylum: Arthropoda
- Class: Insecta
- Order: Coleoptera
- Suborder: Polyphaga
- Infraorder: Staphyliniformia
- Family: Staphylinidae
- Tribe: Glandulariini
- Genus: Microscydmus; Saulcy & Croissandeau, 1893

= Microscydmus =

Genus of beetles

Microscydmus is a genus of beetles belonging to the family Staphylinidae.

The species of this genus are found in Europe, Australia and Northern America.

Species:

- Microscydmus abditus (Coquerel, 1860)
- Microscydmus aberrans Franz, 1986
- Microscydmus lynfieldi Franz, 1977
