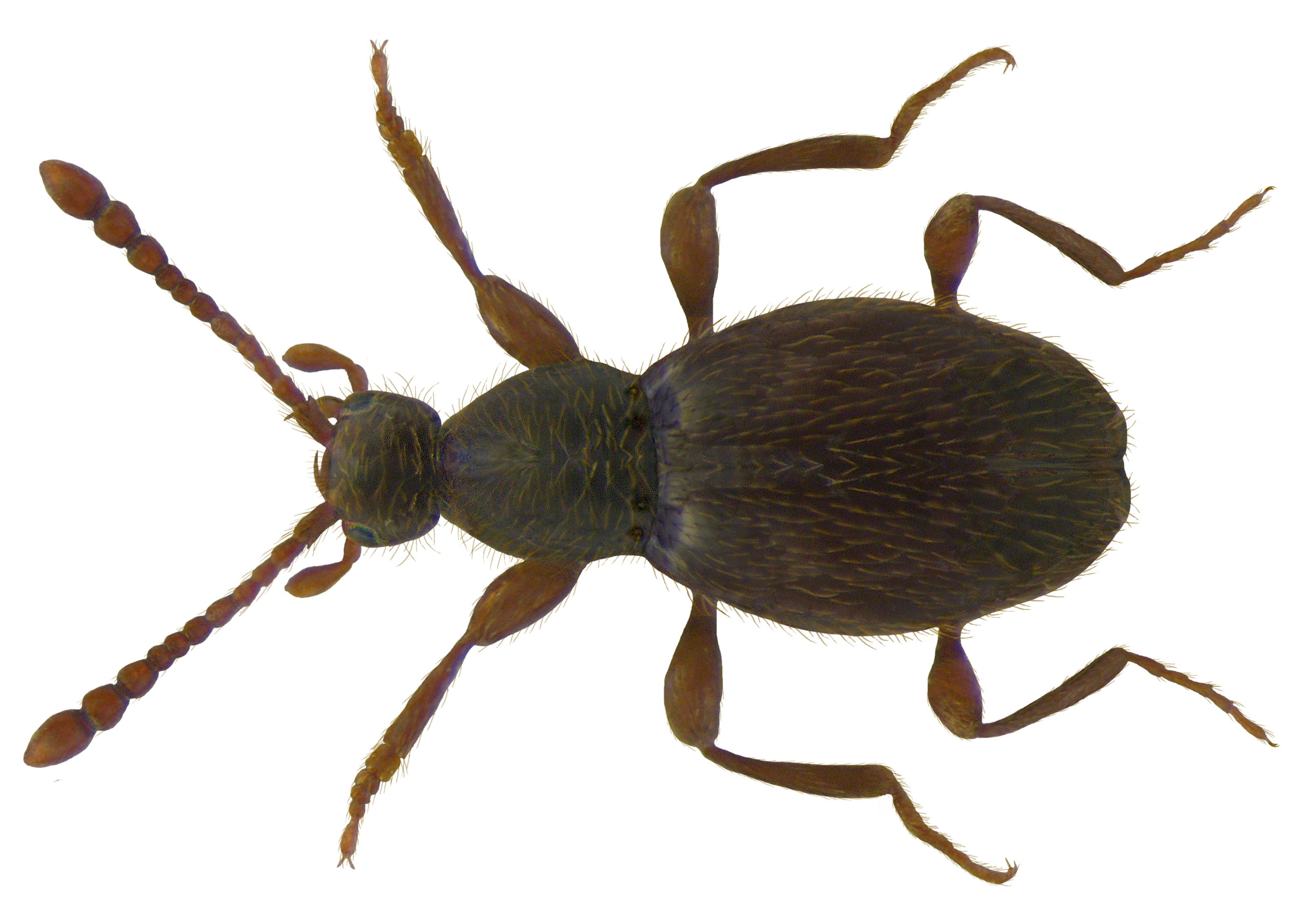
- Scydmaenus tarsatus

Scientific classification
- Kingdom: Animalia
- Phylum: Arthropoda
- Clade: Pancrustacea
- Class: Insecta
- Order: Coleoptera
- Suborder: Polyphaga
- Infraorder: Staphyliniformia
- Family: Staphylinidae
- Subfamily: Scydmaeninae
- Supertribe: Scydmaenitae; Leach

Tribes
- Chevrolatiini; Leptoscydmini; Scydmaenini; Stenichnini

= Scydmaenitae =

Supertribe of ant-like stone beetles

Scydmaenitae is a supertribe under subfamily Scydmaeninae. It includes tribus such as Glandulariini and Scydmaenini.
