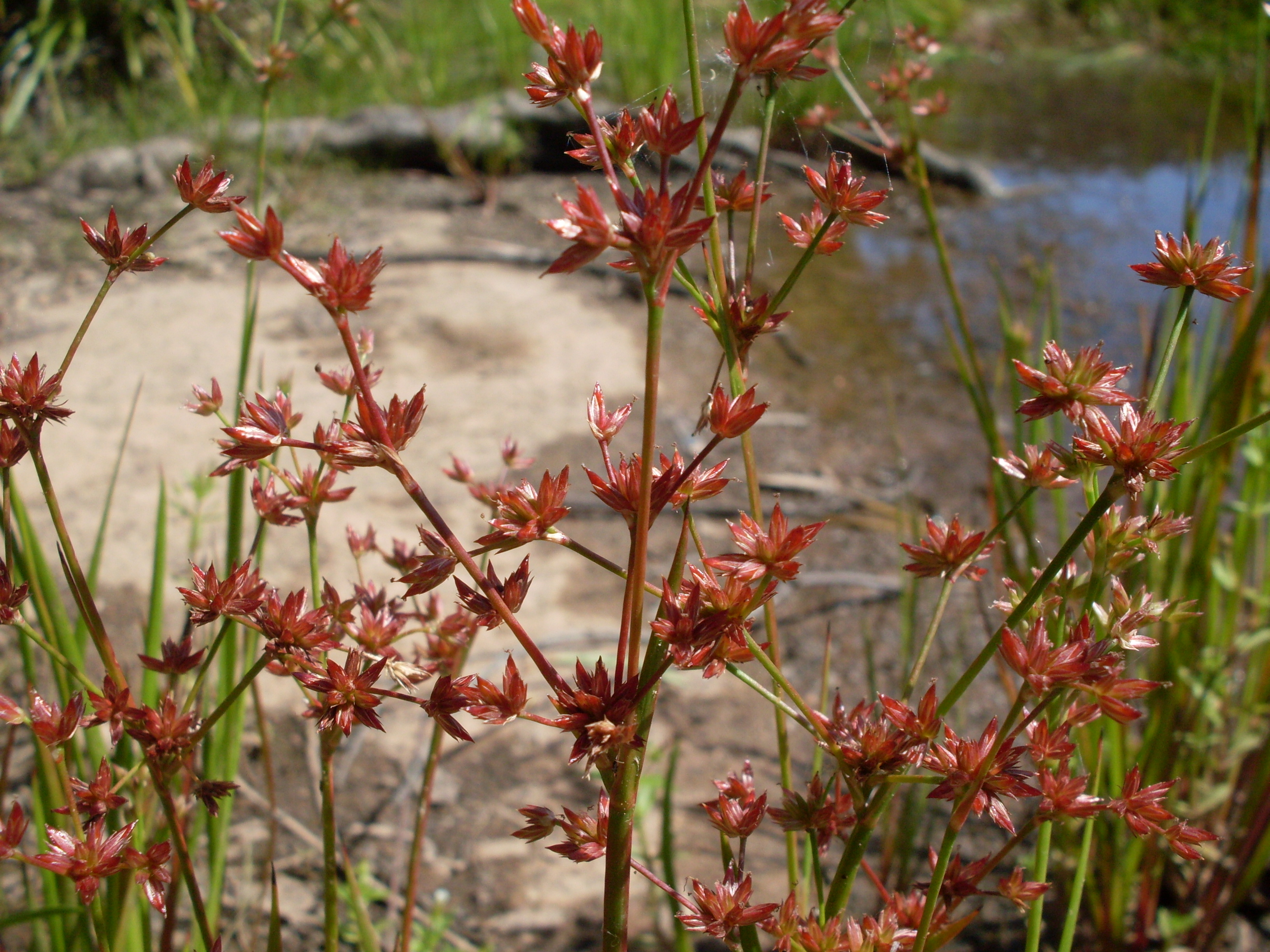

Scientific classification
- Kingdom: Plantae
- Clade: Tracheophytes
- Clade: Angiosperms
- Clade: Monocots
- Clade: Commelinids
- Order: Poales
- Family: Juncaceae
- Genus: Juncus
- Species: J. prismatocarpus

Binomial name
- Juncus prismatocarpus R.Br.

= Juncus prismatocarpus =

branching rush

Species of rush

Juncus prismatocarpus, the branching rush, is a tufted, perennial species of flowering plant in the rush family, Juncaceae. Found in moist situations, often on sandy ground. Grass-like leaves are 10 to 40 cm long, 1.3 to 3.0 mm in diameter. It grows in many parts of Australia, New Zealand and south east Asia. The specific epithet is derived from Latin, meaning prism-shaped fruit.

Due to its flattened unifacial leaves lacking adaxial identity, Juncus prismatocarpus has been used to study leaf development and faciality.
