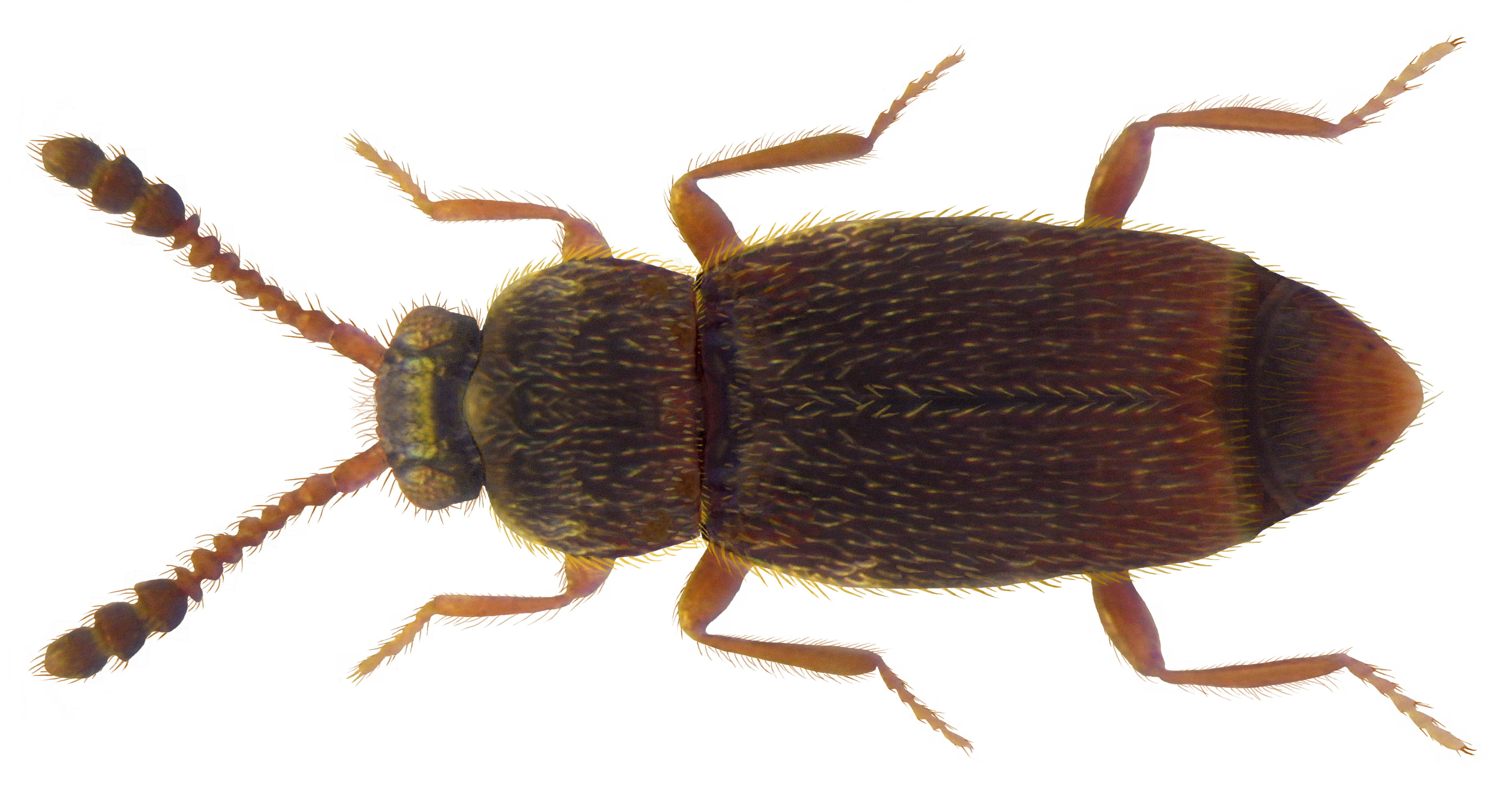
- Eutheia linearis

Scientific classification
- Kingdom: Animalia
- Phylum: Arthropoda
- Clade: Pancrustacea
- Class: Insecta
- Order: Coleoptera
- Suborder: Polyphaga
- Infraorder: Staphyliniformia
- Family: Staphylinidae
- Tribe: Eutheiini
- Genus: Eutheia; Stephens, 1830

= Eutheia =

Genus of beetles

Eutheia is a genus of beetles in the family Staphylinidae. It was first described by James Francis Stephens in 1830.

The species of this genus are found in Europe and North America.

Species:

- Eutheia plicata
- Eutheia schaumi
- Eutheia scydmaenoides
