= Scydmoraphes =

Scientific classification
- Kingdom: Animalia
- Phylum: Arthropoda
- Class: Insecta
- Order: Coleoptera
- Suborder: Polyphaga
- Infraorder: Staphyliniformia
- Family: Staphylinidae
- Genus: Scydmoraphes; Reitter, 1891

Genus of beetles

Scydmoraphes is a genus of beetles belonging to the family Staphylinidae.

Synonym: Atropidus Croissandeau, 1894

Species:

- Scydmoraphes helvolus (Schaum, 1844)
- Scydmoraphes minutus (Chaudoir, 1845)
