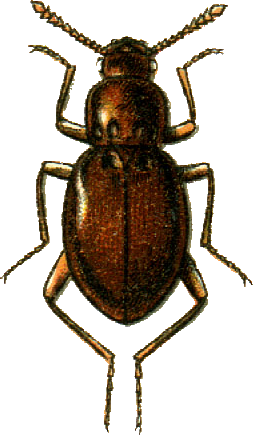

Scientific classification
- Kingdom: Animalia
- Phylum: Arthropoda
- Class: Insecta
- Order: Coleoptera
- Suborder: Polyphaga
- Infraorder: Staphyliniformia
- Family: Staphylinidae
- Genus: Neuraphes; Thomson, 1862

Synonyms
- Nevraphes Thomson, 1859

= Neuraphes =

Genus of beetles

Neuraphes is a genus of beetles belonging to the family Staphylinidae.

The species of this genus are found in Europe and Africa.

== Species ==
- Neuraphes agriatensis Orousset, 2013
- Neuraphes alexandrisi Franz, 1980
