= Cretaceous Research =

Academic journal by Elsevier

- Discipline: Geology, stratigraphy, palaeontology
- Language: English
- Edited by: Eduardo Koutsoukos

Publication details
- History: 1980–present
- Publisher: Elsevier
- Frequency: Bimonthly
- Open access: Hybrid
- Impact factor: 2.176 (2020)

Standard abbreviations
- ISO 4: Cretac. Res.

Indexing
- CODEN: CRRSDD
- ISSN: 0195-6671 (print); 1095-998X (web)
- LCCN: 85643474
- OCLC no.: 36935308

Links
- Journal homepage; Online access

Cretaceous Research is a bimonthly peer-reviewed scientific journal published by Elsevier. The journal focuses on topics dealing with the Cretaceous period and the Cretaceous–Paleogene boundary.

== Abstracting and indexing ==
The journal is abstracted and indexed in Scopus and the Web of Science. According to the Journal Citation Reports, the journal has a 2020 impact factor of 2.176.
