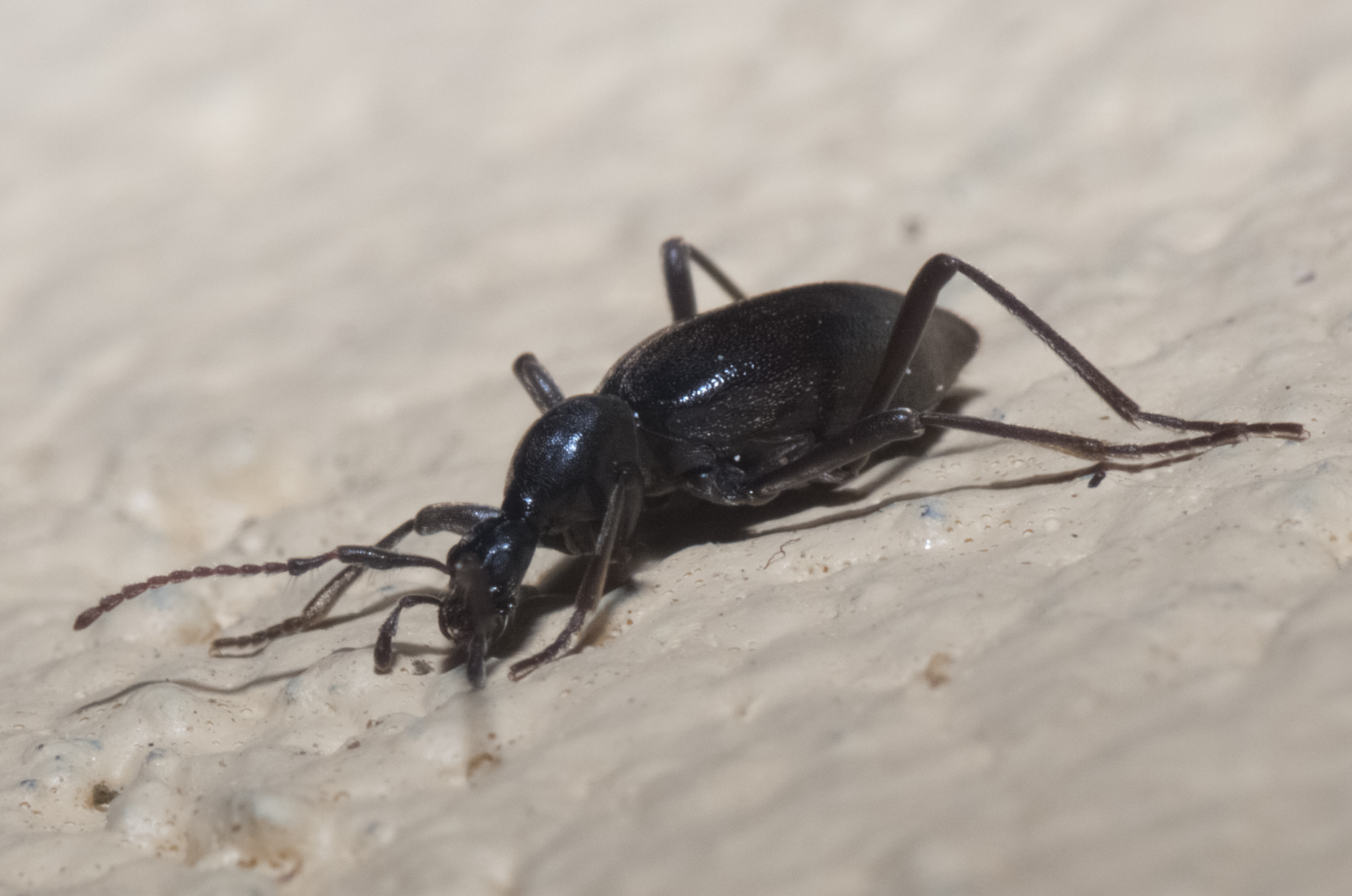
- Palaeostigus prolongatus

Scientific classification
- Kingdom: Animalia
- Phylum: Arthropoda
- Clade: Pancrustacea
- Class: Insecta
- Order: Coleoptera
- Suborder: Polyphaga
- Infraorder: Staphyliniformia
- Family: Staphylinidae
- Subfamily: Scydmaeninae; Leach, 1815

Genera
- See text

= Scydmaeninae =

Scydmaeninae Temporal range: Albian–Present

Subfamily of beetles

Scydmaeninae are a subfamily of small beetles, commonly called ant-like stone beetles or scydmaenines. These beetles occur worldwide, and the subfamily includes some 4,500 species in about 80 genera. Established as a family, they were reduced in status to a subfamily of Staphylinidae in 2009

Many scydmaenine species have a narrowing between head and thorax and thorax and abdomen, resulting in a passing resemblance to ants that inspires their common name. They are typically small beetles, with some very small species only half a millimeter in length. Scydmaenids typically live in leaf litter and rotting logs in forests, preferring moist habitats. A number of types are known to feed on oribatid mites, using "hole scraping" and "cutting" techniques to get through the mite's hard shells.

In addition to the two living subfamilies, the prehistoric subfamily Hapsomelinae, known only from fossils, has been placed here.

== Taxonomy ==
=== Supertribes ===
- Cephenniitae Reitter, 1882
- † Hapsomelitae Poinar & Brown, 2004
- Mastigitae Fleming, 1821
- Scydmaenitae Leach, 1815

=== Selected genera ===
- Cephennium
- Elacatophora Schaufuss, 1884 (including Borneosabahia)
- Euconnus Thomson, 1859
- Eutheia
- Horaeomorphus Schaufuss, 1889
- Loeblites Franz, 1986
- Microscydmus Saulcy & Croissandeau, 1893
- Nevraphes
- Parastenichnaphes Franz, 1984
- Penicillidmus Jałoszyński, 2014
- Protoscydmus Franz, 1992
- Scydmaenus
- Siamites Franz, 1989
- Stenichnus Thomson, 1859
- Synidcus Motschulsky, 1851

=== Extinct genera ===
- Clade Cephenniitae Reitter 1882
  - Tribe Cephenniini Reitter 1882
    - †Praphennium Jałoszyński 2018 Burmese amber, Myanmar, Cenomanian
  - Tribe Eutheiini Casey 1897
    - †Archeutheia Jałoszyński and Peris 2016 El Soplao amber (Spanish amber), Spain, Albian
- Clade Mastigitae Fleming 1821
  - Tribe Clidicini Casey 1897
    - †Palaeoleptochromus O'Keefe 1997 Canadian amber, Foremost Formation, Campanian
  - Tribe Leptochromini Jałoszyński and Brunke 2018
    - †Euroleptochromus Jałoszyński 2012 Baltic amber, Eocene
    - †Rovnoleptochromus Jałoszyński and Perkovsky 2016 Rovno amber, Ukraine, Eocene
- Clade Scydmaenitae Leach 1815
  - †Kachinus Chatzimanolis et al. 2010 Burmese amber, Myanmar, Cenomanian
    - Tribe Scydmaenini Leach 1815
      - †Kuafu Yin et al. 2017 Burmese amber, Myanmar, Cenomanian
    - Tribe Stenichnini Fauvel 1885
      - †Cenomaniola Jałoszyński and Yamamoto 2017 Burmese amber, Myanmar, Cenomanian
      - †Glaesoconnus Jałoszyński and Perkovsky 2016 Rovno amber, Ukraine, Eocene
      - †Hyperstenichnus Jałoszyński and Perrichot 2017 Vendée amber, France, Turonian
      - †Nuegua Yin et al. 2018 Burmese amber, Myanmar, Cenomanian
      - †Pangusyndicus Yin et al. 2018 Burmese amber, Myanmar, Cenomanian
      - †Scydmobisetia Jałoszyński and Yamamoto 2016 Burmese amber, Myanmar, Cenomanian
      - †Taimyraphes Jałoszyński and Perkovsky 2019 Taimyr amber, Russia, Santonian
- †Clade Hapsomelitae Poinar and Brown 2004
  - †Ektatotricha Chatzimanolis et al. 2010 Burmese amber, Myanmar, Cenomanian
  - †Electroatopos Chatzimanolis et al. 2010 Burmese amber, Myanmar, Cenomanian
  - †Hapsomela Poinar and Brown 2004 Burmese amber, Myanmar, Cenomanian
- Incertae sedis
  - †Cryptodiodon Schaufuss 1890 Baltic amber, Eocene
  - †Electroscydmaenus Schaufuss 1890 Baltic amber, Eocene
  - †Hetereuthia Schaufuss 1890 Baltic amber, Eocene
  - †Heuretus Schaufuss 1890 Baltic amber, Eocene
  - †Microlynx Kohring and Schlüter 1989 Sicilian amber, Miocene
  - †Palaeothia Schaufuss 1890 Baltic amber, Eocene
  - †Pinitoides Motschulsky 1856 Baltic amber, Eocene
  - †Scydmaenoides Motschulsky 1856 Baltic amber, Eocene
  - †Semnodioceras Schaufuss 1890 Baltic amber, Eocene
