= 2021 in paleoentomology =

This paleoentomology list records new fossil insect taxa that were described during the year 2021, as well as notes other significant paleoentomology discoveries and events which occurred during that year.

== Clade Amphiesmenoptera ==
=== Lepidoptera ===
==== New Lepidopteran taxa ====
Name	Novelty	Status	Authors	Age	Type locality	Country	Notes	Images
Acanthocorona	Gen. et 7 sp. nov	Valid	Mey, Léger & Lien	Cretaceous; Cenomanian	Burmese amber	Myanmar	A Lophocoronidae moth. The type species is A. skalskii The genus also includes A. bowangi, A. kuranishii, A. muelleri, A. sattleri, A. spinifera, & A. wichardi.	Acanthocorona skalskii
Agathiphagama	Gen. et sp. nov	Valid	Mey, Léger & Lien	Cretaceous; Cenomanian	Burmese amber	Myanmar	An agathiphagid aglossatan moth. The type species is A. perdita.	Agathiphagama perdita
Phyllocnistis cretacea	Sp. nov	Valid	Fischer	Late Cretaceous (Cenomanian)	Burmese amber	Myanmar	A species of Phyllocnistis	
Phyllonorycter inopinata	Sp. nov	Valid	Fischer	Lutetian	Baltic amber	Russia (Kaliningrad Oblast)	A species of Phyllonorycter	

==== Lepidopteran research ====
- The first known Cretaceous caterpillar armoured with spines is described from the Burmese amber by Haug & Haug (2021).
- Fossil leaf mine produced by a lyonetiid-like leaf-mining moth, representing the oldest record of such moths reported to date, is described from the Upper Cretaceous (Campanian) Kaiparowits Formation (Utah, United States) by Maccracken et al. (2021), who name a new ichnotaxon Leucopteropsa spiralae.

=== Trichopterans ===
Name	Novelty	Status	Authors	Age	Type locality	Country	Notes	Images
Archaeopolycentra achupomotet	Sp. nov	Valid	Melnitsky & Ivanov	Late Cretaceous (Santonian)	Kheta Formation (Taymyr amber)	Russia (Krasnoyarsk Krai)	A member of the family Polycentropodidae.	
Archaeopolycentra turvalsia	Sp. nov	Valid	Melnitsky & Ivanov	Late Cretaceous (Santonian)	Kheta Formation (Taymyr amber)	Russia (Krasnoyarsk Krai)	A member of the family Polycentropodidae.	
Cernotina fossilinova	Sp. nov	Valid	Wichard & Neumann	Probably early Miocene	Dominican amber	Dominican Republic	A caddisfly, a species of Cernotina.	
Electrotrichia rasnitsyni	Sp. nov	Valid	Melnitsky, Ivanov & Perkovsky	Late Eocene	Rovno amber	Ukraine	A member of the family Hydroptilidae.	
Folindusia aenigmatosa	Sp. nov	Valid	Sukacheva & Vasilenko	Early Cretaceous		Russia	A larval case of a caddisfly.	
Folindusia expansa	Sp. nov	Valid	Sukacheva & Vasilenko	Early Cretaceous		Russia	A larval case of a caddisfly.	
Folindusia inconspicua	Sp. nov	Valid	Sukacheva & Vasilenko	Early Cretaceous		Russia	A larval case of a caddisfly.	
Folindusia inventa	Sp. nov	Valid	Sukacheva & Vasilenko	Early Cretaceous		Russia	A larval case of a caddisfly.	
Folindusia robusta	Sp. nov	Valid	Sukacheva & Vasilenko	Early Cretaceous		Russia	A larval case of a caddisfly.	
Folindusia tortilis	Sp. nov	Valid	Sukacheva & Vasilenko	Early Cretaceous		Russia	A larval case of a caddisfly.	
Holocentropus tutkaktut	Sp. nov	Valid	Melnitsky, Ivanov & Perkovsky	Eocene (Priabonian)	Rovno amber	Ukraine	A species of Holocentropus.	
Palaeopsilotreta kachini	Sp. nov	Valid	Wichard, Müller & Xu	Cretaceous	Burmese amber	Myanmar	A member of the family Odontoceridae.	
Palaeopsilotreta succini	Sp. nov	Valid	Wichard, Müller & Xu	Cretaceous	Burmese amber	Myanmar	A member of the family Odontoceridae.	
Plectrocnemia kirmikhia	Sp. nov	Valid	Melnitsky, Ivanov & Perkovsky	Eocene (Priabonian)	Rovno amber	Ukraine	A species of Plectrocnemia.	
Psilotreta fossilis	Sp. nov	Valid	Wichard, Müller & Xu	Cretaceous	Burmese amber	Myanmar	A species of Psilotreta.	
Purbimodus khramovi	Sp. nov	Valid	Sukatsheva & Aristov	Early Cretaceous		Russia	A member of the family Vitimotauliidae.	
Terrindusia nova	Sp. nov	Valid	Sukacheva & Vasilenko	Early Cretaceous		Russia	A larval case of a caddisfly.	
Wormaldia denticulata	Sp. nov	In press	Wang et al.	Late Cretaceous (Cenomanian)	Burmese amber	Myanmar	A caddisfly, a species of Wormaldia.	
Wormaldia diplobifurca	Sp. nov	In press	Wang et al.	Late Cretaceous (Cenomanian)	Burmese amber	Myanmar	A caddisfly, a species of Wormaldia.	

== Clade Antliophora ==
=== Dipterans ===
==== New Dipteran taxa ====
Name	Novelty	Status	Authors	Age	Type locality	Country	Notes	Images
Acartophthalmites crassipes	Sp. nov	Valid	Roháček & Hoffeins	Eocene	Baltic amber	Russia (Kaliningrad Oblast)	A member of Opomyzoidea belonging to the new family Clusiomitidae.	
Acartophthalmites luridus	Sp. nov	Valid	Roháček & Hoffeins	Eocene	Baltic amber	Russia (Kaliningrad Oblast)	A member of Opomyzoidea belonging to the new family Clusiomitidae.	
Acartophthalmites rugosus	Sp. nov	Valid	Roháček & Hoffeins	Eocene	Baltic amber	Russia (Kaliningrad Oblast)	A member of Opomyzoidea belonging to the new family Clusiomitidae.	
Aleksiana	Gen. et sp. et comb. nov	Valid	Krzemiński et al.	Cretaceous	Burmese amber	Myanmar	A member of the crane fly family Limoniidae. The type species is A. rasnitsyni; genus also includes "Antocha" lapra Podenas & Poinar (2009).	
Allarete patriciae	Sp. nov	Valid	Nel	Early Eocene	Oise amber	France	A member of the family Cecidomyiidae.	
Allodia paleoafricana	Sp. nov	Valid	Bouju et al.	Early Miocene	Ethiopian amber	Ethiopia	A species of Allodia.	
Apocephalus chiapanecus	Sp. nov	In press	Solórzano-Kraemer et al.	Miocene	Mexican amber	Mexico	A species of Apocephalus.	
Apocephalus dominicanus	Sp. nov	In press	Solórzano-Kraemer et al.	Miocene	Dominican amber	Dominican Republic	A species of Apocephalus.	
Apocephalus miocenus	Sp. nov	In press	Solórzano-Kraemer et al.	Miocene			A species of Apocephalus.	
Araripogon pulchrus	Sp. nov	In press	Lamas, Sampronha & Ribeiro	Early Cretaceous (Aptian)	Crato Formation	Brazil	A member of the family Asilidae.	
Bashkonia	Gen. et sp. nov	Valid	Lukashevich	Middle Triassic	Röt Formation	Germany	A member of the family Nadipteridae. Genus includes new species B. franconica.	
Bibio castaneipennis	Sp. nov	Valid	Skartveit & Wedmann	Oligocene		Germany	A species of Bibio.	
Bibio succineus	Sp. nov	Valid	Skartveit	Eocene	Baltic amber	Europe (Baltic Sea region)	A species of Bibio.	
Burmahesperinus	Gen. et 3 sp. nov	Valid	Ševčík et al.	Late Cretaceous (Cenomanian)	Burmese amber	Myanmar	A member of the family Bibionidae. The type species is B. antennatus; genus also includes B. conicus and B. pedicellatus.	
Burmasymmerus	Gen. et 2 sp. nov	Valid	Ševčík, Hippa & Burdíková	Late Cretaceous (Cenomanian)	Burmese amber	Myanmar	A member of the family Ditomyiidae. The type species is B. korneliae; genus also includes B. wieslawi.	
Burmatricha	Gen. et sp. nov	Valid	Ševčík, Hippa & Burdíková	Late Cretaceous (Cenomanian)	Burmese amber	Myanmar	A member of Sciaroidea of uncertain phylogenetic placement. The type species is B. mesozoica.	
Cascomixticus	Gen. et sp. nov	Valid	Poinar & Vega	Cretaceous (Albian/Cenomanian)	Burmese amber	Myanmar	A member of the family Apsilocephalidae. The type species is C. tubuliferous.	
Clusiomites	Fam. et gen. et comb. et sp. nov	Valid	Roháček & Hoffeins	Eocene	Baltic amber	Russia (Kaliningrad Oblast)	A member of Opomyzoidea, the type genus of the new family Clusiomitidae. The type species is "Acartophthalmites" clusioides Roháček (2016); genus also includes new species C. ornatus.	
Crenoptychoptera gaoi	Sp. nov	Valid	Liu & Huang	Middle–Late Jurassic	Jiyuan Basin	China	A member of the family Ptychopteridae.	
Cretobibio rasnitsyni	Sp. nov	Valid	Lukashevich, Amorim & Ribeiro	Early Cretaceous (Aptian)	Crato Formation	Brazil	A member of the family Bibionidae.	
Cretolimonia dayana	Sp. nov	Valid	Kopeć in Kopeć et al.	Jurassic/Cretaceous boundary	Glushkovo Formation	Russia (Zabaykalsky Krai)	A member of the subfamily Architipulinae. Announced online in 2021; validated in 2026.	
Cretolimonia lukashevichae	Sp. nov	Valid	Kopeć & Krzemiński in Kopeć et al.	Jurassic/Cretaceous boundary	Dain Formation	Russia (Zabaykalsky Krai)	A member of the subfamily Architipulinae. Announced online in 2021; validated in 2026.	
Cretolimonia mikolajczyki	Sp. nov	Valid	Kopeć, Krzemiński, Soszyńska in Kopeć et al.	Late Cretaceous (Cenomanian)	Burmese amber	Myanmar	A member of the subfamily Architipulinae. Announced online in 2021; validated in 2026.	
Cretolimonia pseudojurassica	Sp. nov	Valid	Krzemiński in Kopeć et al.	Jurassic/Cretaceous boundary	Dain Formation	Russia (Zabaykalsky Krai)	A member of the subfamily Architipulinae. Announced online in 2021; validated in 2026.	
Cretothereva	Gen. et sp. nov	In press	Carmo, Lamas & Ribeiro	Early Cretaceous	Crato Formation	Brazil	A member of the family Therevidae. Genus includes new species C. antiqua.	
Cretpenthetria	Gen. et sp. nov	Valid	Li, Zhang & Xiao	Cretaceous	Burmese amber	Myanmar	A member of the family Bibionidae. Genus includes new species C. burmensis.	
Culex ekaterinae	Sp. nov	Valid	Giłka, Harbach & Perkovsky	Eocene	Rovno amber	Ukraine	A mosquito, a species of Culex.	
Culicoides paleopestis	Sp. nov	In press	Peñalver et al.	Eocene	Anglesea amber	Australia	A species of Culicoides.	
Cyttaromyia freiwaldi	Sp. nov	Valid	Kania-Kłosok et al.	Eocene	Green River Formation	United States	A member of the family Cylindrotomidae.	
Cyttaromyia gelhausi	Sp. nov	Valid	Kania-Kłosok et al.	Eocene	Green River Formation	United States	A member of the family Cylindrotomidae.	
Decessia	Gen. et sp. nov	Valid	Krzemiński et al.	Late Cretaceous (Cenomanian)	Burmese amber	Myanmar	A member of the crane fly family Limoniidae. The type species is D. podenasi.	
Elephantomyia christelae	Sp. nov	Valid	Kania-Kłosok & Krzemiński in Kopeć et al.	Eocene	Baltic amber	Europe (Baltic Sea region)	A species of Elephantomyia. Announced online in 2021; validated in 2026.	
Elephantomyia prima	Sp. nov	Valid	Kania-Kłosok & Krzemiński in Kopeć et al.	Eocene	Baltic amber	Europe (Baltic Sea region)	A species of Elephantomyia. Announced online in 2021; validated in 2026.	
Forcipomyia rasnitsyni	Sp. nov	Valid	Szadziewski, Sontag & Pankowski	Miocene	Ethiopian amber	Ethiopia	A species of Forcipomyia.	
Helius hispanicus	Sp. nov		Kania-Kłosok, Krzemiński & Arillo	Early Cretaceous (Albian)	Utrillas Group (Álava amber)	Spain	A species of Helius. Announced in 2021 but not registered in ZooBank at the time; in addition the specific name is preoccupied by Helius hispanicus Lackschewitz (1928). Validated in 2026 under the name Helius ibericus.	
Helius turolensis	Sp. nov		Kania-Kłosok, Krzemiński & Arillo	Early Cretaceous (Albian)	Utrillas Group (San Just amber)	Spain	A species of Helius. Announced in 2021 but not registered in ZooBank at the time; validated in 2026.	
Hirmoneura messelense	Sp. nov	Valid	Wedmann et al.	Eocene (Lutetian)	Messel Formation	Germany	A member of the family Nemestrinidae.	
Lebambromyia sacculifera	Sp. nov	Valid	Badano, Zhang, Yeates & Cerretti in Badano et al.	Late Cretaceous (Cenomanian)	Burmese amber	Myanmar	A member of Phoroidea.	
Leptotarsus andradei	Sp. nov	Valid	Ribeiro, Santos & Santos	Early Cretaceous	Crato Formation	Brazil	A species of Leptotarsus.	
Leptotarsus gelhausi	Sp. nov	Valid	Ribeiro, Santos & Santos	Early Cretaceous	Crato Formation	Brazil	A species of Leptotarsus.	
Leptotarsus ivoneae	Sp. nov	Valid	Ribeiro, Santos & Santos	Early Cretaceous	Crato Formation	Brazil	A species of Leptotarsus.	
Leptotarsus lemeae	Sp. nov	Valid	Ribeiro, Santos & Santos	Early Cretaceous	Crato Formation	Brazil	A species of Leptotarsus.	
Mesoacentron	Gen. et sp. nov	Valid	Giłka, Zakrzewska, Lukashevich & Cranston in Giłka et al.	Late Cretaceous (Santonian)	Kheta Formation (Taimyr amber)	Russia	A member of the family Chironomidae belonging to the subfamily Chironominae and the tribe Pseudochironomini. The type species is M. kaluginae.	
Meunierohelea anglesensis	Sp. nov	In press	Peñalver et al.	Eocene	Anglesea amber	Australia	A member of the family Ceratopogonidae.	
Minyohelea nexuosa	Sp. nov	In press	Pielowska-Ceranowska, Azar & Szwedo	Early Cretaceous (Barremian)	Lebanese amber	Lebanon	A member of the family Ceratopogonidae.	
Myriophora asiatica	Sp. nov	In press	Solórzano-Kraemer et al.	Miocene	Zhangpu amber	China	A species of Myriophora.	
Neoarisemus groehni	Sp. nov	Valid	Wagner	Eocene		Ukraine	A member of the family Psychodidae.	
Orimarguloides	Gen. et sp. nov	Valid	Men & Podenas	Cretaceous	Burmese amber	Myanmar	A member of the crane fly family Limoniidae. Genus includes new species O. simplex.	
Palaeocentron	Gen. et sp. nov	Valid	Giłka, Zakrzewska, Lukashevich & Cranston in Giłka et al.	Cretaceous (probably Albian–Cenomanian)	Burmese amber	Myanmar	A member of the family Chironomidae belonging to the subfamily Chironominae and the tribe Pseudochironomini. The type species is P. krzeminskii.	
Palaeoglaesum pilosus	Sp. nov	Valid	Skibińska, Krzemiński & Zhang in Skibińska et al.	Late Cretaceous (Cenomanian)	Burmese amber	Myanmar	A member of the family Psychodidae belonging to the subfamily Bruchomyiinae.	
Palaeoglaesum stebneri	Sp. nov	Valid	Skibińska & Krzemiński in Skibińska et al.	Late Cretaceous (Cenomanian)	Burmese amber	Myanmar	A member of the family Psychodidae belonging to the subfamily Bruchomyiinae.	
Palaeoglaesum teres	Sp. nov	Valid	Skibińska & Albrycht in Skibińska et al.	Late Cretaceous (Cenomanian)	Burmese amber	Myanmar	A member of the family Psychodidae belonging to the subfamily Bruchomyiinae.	
Paleoplatyura agnieszkae	Sp. nov	Valid	Ševčík, Krzemiński & Skibińska	Cretaceous	Burmese amber	Myanmar	A species of Paleoplatyura.	
Paleoplatyura magnifica	Sp. nov	Valid	Ševčík, Krzemiński & Skibińska	Cretaceous	Burmese amber	Myanmar	A species of Paleoplatyura.	
Paleoplatyura miae	Sp. nov	Valid	Ševčík, Krzemiński & Skibińska	Cretaceous	Burmese amber	Myanmar	A species of Paleoplatyura.	
Paleotelmatoscopus	Gen. et comb. et sp. nov	Valid	Curler & Skibińska	Eocene	Baltic amber	Europe (Baltic Sea region)	A member of the family Psychodidae. The type species is "Pericoma" formosa Meunier (1905); genus also includes new species P. madrizi.	
Polymera alexanderi	Sp. nov	Valid	Krzemiński et al.	Miocene	Dominican amber	Dominican Republic	A species of Polymera.	
Protopenthetria	Gen. et sp. nov	Valid	Li et al.	Cretaceous	Burmese amber	Myanmar	A member of the family Bibionidae. Genus includes new species P. skartveiti.	
Rhabdomastix asiatica	Sp. nov	Valid	Kania-Kłosok et al.	Late Cretaceous (Cenomanian)	Burmese amber	Myanmar	A species of Rhabdomastix.	
Rhabdomastix cretacica	Sp. nov	Valid	Kania-Kłosok et al.	Late Cretaceous (Cenomanian)	Burmese amber	Myanmar	A species of Rhabdomastix.	
Rhabdomastix krzeminskae	Sp. nov	Valid	Kania-Kłosok et al.	Late Cretaceous (Cenomanian)	Burmese amber	Myanmar	A species of Rhabdomastix.	
Rhabdomastix myanmae	Sp. nov	Valid	Kania-Kłosok et al.	Late Cretaceous (Cenomanian)	Burmese amber	Myanmar	A species of Rhabdomastix.	
Rhipidoxylomyia rasnitsyni	Sp. nov	Valid	Nel	Early Eocene	Oise amber	France	A member of the family Cecidomyiidae.	
Stempellinella gilkai	Sp. nov	Valid	Zakrzewska & Jankowska	Eocene	Baltic amber	Europe (Baltic Sea region)	A species of Stempellinella.	
Trichoneura xavieri	Sp. nov	Valid	Kania-Kłosok, Krzemiński, Kopeć & Arillo in Kopeć et al.	Early Cretaceous (Albian)	Utrillas Group	Spain	A species of Trichoneura. Announced online in 2021; validated in 2026.	
Zhangsolva burmensis	Sp. nov	In press	Zhang & Zhang	Cretaceous	Burmese amber	Myanmar	A member of the family Zhangsolvidae.	

==== Dipteran research ====
- Baranov et al. (2021) document a high diversity of fly larvae from the Eocene Baltic amber, preserving taxonomically, morphologically, and ecologically important characters, and evaluate the implications of this finding for the knowledge of the functional ecology of the Eocene fly larvae.

=== Mecopterans ===
Name	Novelty	Status	Authors	Age	Type locality	Country	Notes	Images
Conicholcorpa longa	Sp. nov		Zhang, Shih & Ren in Zhang et al.	Middle Jurassic	Jiulongshan Formation	China	A scorpionfly belonging to the family Holcorpidae.	
Glanomerope	Gen. et sp. nov	Valid	Poschmann & Nel	Permian	Meisenheim Formation	Germany	A scorpionfly belonging to the family Protomeropidae. Genus includes new species G. virgoferroa.	
Longiphlebia incompleta	Sp. nov	In press	Lian, Cai & Huang	Late Jurassic	Tiaojishan Formation	China	A scorpionfly belonging to the family Orthophlebiidae.	
Mesopsyche jinsuoguanensis	Sp. nov	Valid	Lian, Cai & Huang	Middle Triassic	Tongchuan Formation	China	A member of the family Mesopsychidae. Originally described as a species of Mesopsyche; transferred by Lian et al. (2024) to the genus Turbidapsyche.	
Mesopsyche liaoi	Sp. nov	Valid	Lian, Cai & Huang	Late Triassic	Huangshanjie Formation	China	A member of the family Mesopsychidae. Originally described as a species of Mesopsyche; transferred by Lian et al. (2024) to the genus Turbidapsyche.	

== Clade Archaeorthoptera ==
=== †Caloneurodea ===
Name	Novelty	Status	Authors	Age	Type locality	Country	Notes	Images
Aviobiella	Gen. et sp. nov	Valid	Nel & Roques	Carboniferous (Moscovian)		France	A member of Archaeorthoptera belonging to the order Caloneurodea. Genus includes new species A. garroustei.	
Oudardgramma	Gen. et sp. nov		Nel & Roques	Carboniferous (Bashkirian)		France	The type species is O. bruayensis.	
Paraspiculum	Gen. et sp. nov	In press	Dvořák et al.	Carboniferous (Moscovian)		Germany	A member of Archaeorthoptera belonging to the group Caloneurodea. Genus includes new species P. brauckmannii.	

=== †Cnemidolestodea ===
Name	Novelty	Status	Authors	Age	Type locality	Country	Notes	Images
Avionxixia	Gen. et sp. nov	Valid	Nel & Roques	Carboniferous (Moscovian)		France	A member of Archaeorthoptera belonging to the family Cnemidolestidae. The type species is A. gui.	
Ctenoptilus frequens	Sp. nov	Valid	Chen et al.	Carboniferous (Bashkirian to Moscovian)	Yanghugou Formation	China	A member of Archaeorthoptera belonging to the family Ctenoptilidae.	
Palatinarkema	Gen. et sp. nov	Valid	Nel & Poschmann	Early Permian (probably Asselian–?Sakmarian)	Meisenheim Formation	Germany	A member of Archaeorthoptera belonging to the family Cnemidolestidae. The type species is P. prokopi.	
Piesbergopterum	Gen. et 2 sp. nov	In press	Dvořák et al.	Carboniferous (Moscovian)		France; Germany	A member of Archaeorthoptera belonging to the group Cnemidolestodea. Genus includes new species P. punctatum Dvořák et al. and P. avionensis Nel & Roques.	

=== Orthopterans ===
==== New Orthopteran taxa ====
Name	Novelty	Status	Authors	Age	Type locality	Country	Notes	Images
Amberotridactylus	Gen. et sp. nov	In press	Du, Xu & Zhang	Cretaceous	Burmese amber	Myanmar	A member of the family Tridactylidae. Genus includes new species A. cheni.	
Archaboilus polyneurus	Sp. nov	Valid	Gu, Yue & Ren in Gu et al.	Middle Jurassic (Bathonian–Callovian)	Jiulongshan Formation	China	An ensiferan belonging to the group Hagloidea and the family Haglidae.	
Caelielca	Gen. et sp. nov	In press	Uchida	Cretaceous	Burmese amber	Myanmar	A member of the family Elcanidae. Genus includes new species C. spinocrus.	
Cascogryllus setosus	Sp. nov	In press	Du, Xu & Zhang	Cretaceous	Burmese amber	Myanmar	A member of the family Tridactylidae.	
Cratoelcana rasnitsyni	Sp. nov	Valid	Nel & Jouault	Early Cretaceous	Crato Formation	Brazil	A member of the family Elcanidae. Originally described as a species of Cratoelcana, but subsequently transferred to the genus Mesembrelcana.	
Hukawnelca	Gen. et sp. nov	In press	Uchida	Cretaceous	Burmese amber	Myanmar	A member of the family Elcanidae. Genus includes new species H. gracile.	
Panorpidium spica	Sp. nov	In press	Kim et al.	Early Cretaceous (Albian)	Jinju Formation	South Korea	An orthopteran belonging to the family Elcanidae.	
Permohagla	Gen. et sp. nov	Valid	Gorochov	Late Permian		Russia (Kemerovo Oblast)	A member of Hagloidea. Genus includes new species P. tomica.	
Phyllotridactylus	Gen. et sp. nov	In press	Xu et al.	Cretaceous	Burmese amber	Myanmar	A member of the family Tridactylidae. Genus includes new species P. wangi.	
Pseudoacrida sennlaubi	Sp. nov	Valid	Nel & Jouault	Early Cretaceous	Crato Formation	Brazil	A member of the family Locustopsidae.	

==== Orthopteran research ====
- Revision of the fossil record of the family Trigonidiidae is published by Desutter-Grandcolas et al. (2021).

=== †Titanoptera ===
Name	Novelty	Status	Authors	Age	Type locality	Country	Notes	Images
Theiatitan	Fam. et gen. et sp. nov	Valid	Schubnel, Roques & Nel in Schubnel et al.	Carboniferous (Moscovian)		France	A member of Titanoptera belonging to the new family Theiatitanidae. The type species is T. azari.	Theiatitan azari

=== Other archaeorthopterans ===
Name	Novelty	Status	Authors	Age	Type locality	Country	Notes	Images
Archaeogerarus	Fam. et gen. et sp. nov	Valid	Nel & Roques	Carboniferous (Moscovian)		France	A member of Archaeorthoptera belonging to the new family Archaeogeraridae. The type species is A. schubneli.	
Avionugonioneura	Gen. et sp. nov	Valid	Nel & Roques	Carboniferous (Moscovian)		France	A member of Archaeorthoptera possibly belonging to the family Nugonioneuridae. Genus includes new species A. jouaulti.	
Contracladus	Gen. et sp. nov	In press	Dvořák et al.	Carboniferous (Moscovian)		Germany	A member of Archaeorthoptera of uncertain phylogenetic placement. Genus includes new species C. impar.	
Duquesnia	Gen. et sp. nov	Valid	Nel & Roques in Nel, Roques & Duquesne	Carboniferous (Moscovian)		France	A member of Archaeorthoptera. Genus includes new species D. gallica.	
Penanoptera	Gen. et sp. nov	Valid	Nel & Poschmann	Early Permian	Saar–Nahe Basin	Germany	A member of Archaeorthoptera. Genus includes new species P. manseri.	

== Clade Coleopterida ==
=== Coleoptera ===
==== Adephaga ====
Name	Novelty	Status	Authors	Age	Type locality	Country	Notes	Images
Antephilorhizus	Gen. et sp. nov	Valid	Kirichenko-Babko, Perkovsky & Vasilenko	Eocene	Rovno amber	Ukraine	A ground beetle belonging to the tribe Lebiini. Genus includes new species A. pripiatiensis.	
Balticeler	Gen. et sp. nov	Valid	Schmidt & Maddison in Schmidt, Scholz & Maddison	Eocene	Baltic amber	Europe (Baltic Sea region)	A ground beetle belonging to the subfamily Trechinae. The type species is B. kerneggeri.	
Calosoma kimi	Sp. nov	Valid	Lee & Nam	Early Miocene	Geumgwangdong Formation	South Korea	A species of Calosoma.	

==== Archostemata ====
Name	Novelty	Status	Authors	Age	Type locality	Country	Notes	Images
Jurodes shef	Sp. nov	Valid	Yan, Strelnikova & Cai	Early Cretaceous (Berriasian-Barremian)	Gusinoe Ozero Group	Russia (Buryatia)	A Jurodid beetle.	
Kirejtomma	Gen. et comb. nov	Valid	Li & Cai	Cretaceous	Burmese amber	Myanmar	An Ommatid beetle The type species is "Clessidromma" zengi (2020).	Kirejtomma zengi
Limnomma	Gen. et sp. nov	Valid	Li & Cai in Li et al.	Middle Jurassic	Haifanggou Formation	China	An Ommatid beetle. The type species is L. daohugouense.	Limnomma daohugouense
Omma axsmithi	Sp. nov	In press	Jarzembowski, Zheng & Zhao	Cretaceous	Burmese amber	Myanmar	An Omma species Ommatid beetle.	
Omma forte	Sp. nov	Valid	Li & Cai in Li, Huang & Cai	Cretaceous (Albian to Cenomanian)	Burmese amber	Myanmar	An Omma species Ommatid beetle.	
Paraodontomma leptocristatum	Sp. nov	Valid	Li, Yamamoto & Cai in Li et al.	Cretaceous (Albian to Cenomanian)	Burmese amber	Myanmar	An Ommatid beetle.	Paraodontomma leptocristatum
Permocatinus	Gen. et sp. nov	Valid	Ponomarenko	Late Permian		Russia	A Coleocatiniid beetle. The type species is P. tomiensis.	
Tomiaplus	Gen. et comb. et sp. nov	Valid	Ponomarenko	Late Permian		Russia	A Triaplid beetle. The type species is "Triaplus" sibiricus (2013), as well as new species T. minimus.	
Tunguskagyrus уani	Sp. nov	Valid	Ponomarenko	Late Permian		Russia	A Triaplid beetle.	
Zygadenia alexrasnitsyni	Sp. nov	Valid	Strelnikova & Yan	Early Cretaceous	Zaza Formation	Russia	An Ommatid beetle.	

==== Myxophaga ====
Name	Novelty	Status	Authors	Age	Type locality	Country	Notes	Images
Triamyxa	Fam., Gen. et sp. nov	Valid	Qvarnström et al.	Late Triassic (Carnian)	Keuper succession (Drawno Beds)	Poland	A Triamyxid beetle in the suborder Myxophaga. The type species is T. coprolithica.	Triamyxa coprolithica

==== Polyphaga ====
===== Bostrichiformia =====
Name	Novelty	Status	Authors	Age	Type locality	Country	Notes	Images
Archaenosodendron	Gen. comb. et 3 sp. nov	Valid	Li & Cai in Li et al.	Cretaceous (Albian to Cenomanian)	Burmese amber	Myanmar	A nosodendrid beetle. The type species is "Nosodendron" cretaceum; genus also includes new species A. angulare, A. explanatum and A. remotidens.	
Cretomegatoma	Gen. et comb. nov	Valid	Háva	Late Cretaceous (Cenomanian)	Burmese amber	Myanmar	A carpet beetle. The type species is "Megatoma" atypica (2017).	
Mesonosa	Gen. et sp. nov	Valid	Tihelka et al.	Late Cretaceous (Cenomanian)	Burmese amber	Myanmar	A wounded-tree beetle. The type species is M. scandens.	
Petalium bruteno	Sp. nov	Valid	Alekseev & Bukejs	Late Eocene; Priabonian	Baltic amber	Russia (Kaliningrad Oblast)	A Petalium species death watch beetle.	
Petalium widewuto	Sp. nov	Valid	Alekseev & Bukejs	Eocene	Baltic amber	Russia (Kaliningrad Oblast)	A Petalium species death watch beetle.	
Trogoderma ainu	Sp. nov	Valid	Perkovsky, Háva & Zaitsev	Middle Eocene	Sakhalin amber	Russia	A Trogoderma species carpet beetle.	
Tuberphradonoma	Gen. et sp. nov	Valid	Háva	Late Cretaceous; Cenomanian)	Burmese amber	Myanmar	A carpet beetle. The type species is T. burmitica.	
Xyletinus lobanovi	Sp. nov	Valid	Bukejs, Alekseev & Háva	Eocene	Baltic amber	Russia (Kaliningrad Oblast)	A Xyletinusspecies death watch beetle.	

===== Cucujiformia =====
====== New Cucujiformian taxa ======
Name	Novelty	Status	Authors	Age	Type locality	Country	Notes	Images
Aberrokorynetes oceanojubilaei	Sp. nov	In press	Kolibáč et al.	Eocene	Baltic amber	Russia (Kaliningrad Oblast)	A Korynetinae checkered beetle.	
Aliattalus	Gen. et sp. nov	Valid	Tshernyshev	Late Eocene	Baltic amber	Europe	A Malachiinae malachite beetle. The type species is A. intercalaris.	
Archaeosciaphilus gyrommatus	Sp. nov	In press	Legalov & Poinar	Eocene	Baltic amber	Russia (Kaliningrad Oblast)	A Polydrusini Entiminae broad nosed weevil.	
Arkagalarhinus	Gen. et sp. nov	In press	Legalov	Late Cretaceous (Santonian-Campanian)	Arkagala Formation	Russia	A Chilecarinae ithycerid weevil. The type species is A. zherikhini.	
Asiomira dubrovinae	Sp. nov	Valid	Nabozhenko & Bukejs	Eocene	Baltic amber	Russia (Kaliningrad Oblast)	An Alleculinae darkling beetle.	
Aulacoscelis santanensis	Sp. nov	In press	Legalov	Early Cretaceous (Aptian-Albian)	Santana Group	Brazil	An orsodacnid leaf beetle.	
Baltocar sontagae	Sp. nov	Valid	Bukejs & Legalov	Eocene	Baltic amber	Russia (Kaliningrad Oblast)	A Sayrevilleinae tooth-nosed snout weevil.	
Baltosidis	Gen. et 3 sp. nov	Valid	Szawaryn	Eocene	Baltic amber	Europe	A Microweiseini Microweiseinae lady beetle. The type species is B. damzeni; genus also includes B. damgaardi and B. szadziewskii.	
Bronchotibia	Gen. et sp. nov	In press	Poinar & Legalov	Miocene (Burdigalian)	Dominican amber	Dominican Republic	A Lymantini Molytinae weevil. The type species is B. adunatus.	
Cathartosilvanus perkovskyi	Sp. nov	Valid	Alekseev & Bukejs	Late Eocene	Rovno amber	Ukraine	A silvanid beetle.	
Ceutorhynchus zerovae	Sp. nov	Valid	Legalov et al.	Late Eocene	Rovno amber	Ukraine	A weevil.	
Coslonatus	Gen. et sp. nov	Valid	Li & Cai	Cenomanian	Burmese amber	Myanmar	A Colydiinae? Zopheridae tenebrionoid beetle. The type species is C. rasnitsyni.	
Cretaidgia	Gen. et sp. nov	In press	Zhao, Liu & Yu	Late Cretaceous (Cenomanian)	Burmese amber	Myanmar	A prionocerid beetle. The type species is C. burmensis.	
Diapus ethiopicus	Sp. nov	In press	Solórzano-Kraemer et al.	Miocene	Ethiopian amber	Ethiopia	A Platypodinae pinhole borer ambrosia weevil.	
Diapus resinae	Sp. nov	In press	Solórzano-Kraemer et al.	Miocene	Zhangpu amber	China	A Platypodinae pinhole borer ambrosia weevil.	
Dorytomus mikhailovi	Sp. nov	Valid	Legalov, Nazarenko & Perkovsky	Late Eocene	Rovno amber	Ukraine	A species of Dorytomus Curculioninae weevil.	
Electroxylita	Gen. et sp. nov	Valid	Alekseev & Bukejs	Middle Eocene; Priabonian	Baltic amber	Russia (Kaliningrad Oblast)	A false darkling beetle. The type species is E. chronographica.	
Eurocrossotus	Gen. et sp. nov	Valid	Vitali	Eocene	Baltic amber	Europe (Baltic Sea region)	A longhorn beetle belonging to the tribe Crossotini. The type species is E. alekseevi.	
Glaesotropis rohdendorfi	Sp. nov	Valid	Legalov, Nazarenko & Perkovsky	Eocene (Priabonian)	Rovno amber	Ukraine	A zygaenodinin anthribine anthribid fungus weevil.	
Glesoconomorphus ekaterinae	Sp. nov	Valid	Telnov et al.	Late Eocene; Priabonian	Rovno amber	Ukraine	A mycterid palm beetle.	
Gracilenticrus	Gen. et sp. nov	Valid	Yu, Kolibáč & Ślipiński in Yu et al.	Late Cretaceous (Cenomanian)	Burmese amber	Myanmar	A lophocaterid beetle. The type species is G. burmiticus.	
Heterhelus buzina	Sp. nov	Valid	Kupryjanowicz, Lyubarsky & Perkovsky	Eocene	Rovno amber	Ukraine	A Kateretid short-winged flower beetle. Originally described as a species of Heterhelus, but Kirejtshuk, Jenkins Shaw & Smirnov (2023) transferred it to the genus Antirhelus.	
Isomira lobanovi	Sp. nov	Valid	Nabozhenko & Bukejs	Eocene	Baltic amber	Russia (Kaliningrad Oblast)	An Isomira species claw comb darkling beetle.	
Kaszubia	Gen. et sp. nov	Valid	Legalov, Kupryjanowicz & Perkovsky	Late Eocene; Priabonian	Baltic amber	Poland	A cossonine weevil. The type species is K. wanati.	
Kulindrobor	Gen. et 2 sp. nov	Valid	Tihelka et al.	Late Cretaceous; Cenomanian	Burmese amber	Myanmar	A tenebrionoid beetle of uncertain phylogenetic placement. Genus includes new species K. enigmaticus and K. magnus.	
Lobanoviella	Gen. et sp. nov	In press	Kirejtshuk & Reid	Eocene	Baltic amber	Europe	A lobanovielline palophagine megalopodid leaf beetle. The type species is L. andreyi.	
Madelinia capillata	Sp. nov	Valid	Alekseev & Bukejs	Middle Eocene; Priabonian	Baltic amber	Russia (Kaliningrad Oblast)	A false darkling beetle.	
Melanosiagon	Gen. et sp. nov	Valid	Batelka & Prokop	Late Cretaceous (Cenomanian)	Burmese amber	Myanmar	A wedge-shaped beetle. The type species is M. serraticornis.	
Metaclisa ottoi	Sp. nov	Valid	Nabozhenko, McKellar & Bukejs	Late Eocene; Priabonian	Baltic amber	Russia (Kaliningrad Oblast)	AMetaclisa species metaclisine darkling beetle.	
Microscapha kugelanni	Sp. nov	Valid	Alekseev & Bukejs	Middle Eocene; Priabonian	Baltic amber	Russia (Kaliningrad Oblast)	A false darkling beetle.	
Microtrogossita	Gen. et sp. nov	Valid	Li & Cai in Li et al.	Cretaceous; Cenomanian	Burmese amber	Myanmar	A Trogossitid bark-gnawing beetle. The type species is M. qizhihaoi.	
Monolepta rappsilberi	Sp. nov	Valid	Bukejs et al.	Late Eocene; Priabonian	Bitterfeld amber	Germany	A Monolepta species skeletonizing leaf beetle.	
Neolatitergum	Nom. nov	Valid	Zhang	Jurassic	Jiulongshan Formation	China	A Trogossitid bark-gnawing beetle. A replacement name for "Latitergum" Yu et al. (2014).	
Oedemera girulskii	Sp. nov	Valid	Szawaryn, Sontag & Kubisz	Late Eocene; Priabonian	Baltic amber	Russia (Kaliningrad Oblast)	An Oedemera species false blister beetle.	
Pacyclaxyra	Gen. et sp. nov	Valid	Tihelka, Huang & Cai	Late Cretaceous; Cenomanian	Burmese amber	Myanmar	A sooty mould beetle. The type species is P. azari.	
Palaeatalasis	Gen. et sp. nov	Valid	Legalov	Eocene (Ypresian)	Green River Formation	United States (Utah)	A Megamerini Sagrinae leaf beetle. The type species is P. monrosi.	
Palaeoanoplus	Trib., Gen., et sp. nov	Valid	Legalov	Late Eocene; Priabonian	Baltic amber	Europe	A Palaeoanoplini Curculioninae weevil. The type species is P. horridus.	
Paleopegorhinus	Gen. et sp. nov	Valid	Poinar, Brown & Legalov	Late Cretaceous (Cenomanian)	Burmese amber	Myanmar	A Chilecarinae new york weevil. The type species is P. micrommatus.	
Palaeopeplus	Gen. et sp. nov	Valid	Powell & Cline	Miocene (Burdigalina)	Dominican amber	Dominican Republic	A Cillaeinae sap beetle. The type species is P. cascus.	
Pelretes	Gen. et sp. nov	Valid	Tihelka et al.	Cretaceous	Burmese amber	Myanmar	Originally described as a short-winged flower beetle; subsequently argued to be a sap beetle belonging to the subfamily Apophisandrinae or a member of the separate family Apophisandridae. The type species is P. vivificus .	
Phloiotrya inmarinata	Sp. nov	Valid	Alekseev & Bukejs	Middle Eocene; Priabonian	Baltic amber	Russia (Kaliningrad Oblast)	A Phloiotrya species false darkling beetle.	
Protodasytes	Gen. et sp. nov	Valid	Tihelka et al.	Late Cretaceous (Cenomanian)	Charentese amber	France	A soft-wing flower beetle. The type species is P. cretaceus.	
Protomauroania	Gen. et 2 sp. nov	Valid	Tshernyshev in Tshernyshev & Shcherbakov	Late Eocene	Baltic amber Rovno amber	Baltic Sea region Ukraine	A Dasytinae malachite beetle. The type species P. chaetophorata Genus also includes P. mikhailovi.	
Protostomopsis	Gen. et sp. nov	Valid	Bukejs, Ślipiński & Alekseev in Bukejs et al.	Eocene	Baltic amber	Poland; Russia (Kaliningrad Oblast)	A cerylonid beetle. The type species is P. pandema.	
Pseudomesauletes lobanovi	Sp. nov	Valid	Bukejs & Legalov	Eocene	Baltic amber	Russia (Kaliningrad Oblast)	A Rhynchitinae tooth-nosed snout weevil.	
Pulchritudo	Gen. et sp. nov	Valid	Krell & Vitali	Eocene (Ypresian)	Green River Formation	United States (Colorado)	A Sagrinae leaf beetle. The type species is P. attenboroughi.	
Rhamphophorus	Trib., gen. et sp. nov	Valid	Poinar & Brown	Cretaceous; Cenomanian	Burmese amber	Myanmar	A Rhamphophorini Cimberidinae pine flower weevil. The type species is R. legalovii.	
Salignacicola	Gen. et comb. nov	Valid	Batelka & Prokop	Late Cretaceous (Cenomanian)		France	A wedge shaped beetle. The type species is "Macrosiagon" ebboi (2004).	
Symphora glaesonauta	Sp. nov	Valid	Alekseev & Bukejs	Middle Eocene; Priabonian	Baltic amber	Russia (Kaliningrad Oblast)	A false darkling beetle.	
Symphora pollocki	Sp. nov	Valid	Alekseev & Bukejs	Middle Eocene; Priabonian	Baltic amber	Russia (Kaliningrad Oblast)	A false darkling beetle.	
Teredolaemus primigenius	Sp. nov	Valid	Alekseev et al.	Late Eocene; Priabonian	Baltic amber	Russia (Kaliningrad Oblast)	A teredid beetle.	
Toxorhynchus michalskii	Sp. nov	Valid	Legalov	Late Eocene; Priabonian	Baltic amber	Europe	An Apioninae straight-snouted weevil.	
Trematosphindus	Gen. et sp. nov	Valid	Li & Cai in Li et al.	Cretaceous (Cenomanian)	Burmese amber	Myanmar	A slime mold beetle. The type species is T. newtoni	
Zaiwa	Gen. et sp. nov	Valid	Lyubarsky et al.	Cretaceous; Cenomanian	Burmese amber	Myanmar	A lophocaterid beetle. The type species is Z. pankowskiorum.	
Zherikhiniellus	Gen. et sp. nov	Valid	Legalov	late Eocene; Priabonian	Baltic amber	Europe	A Nanophyinae straight-snouted weevil. The type species is Z. rarus.	

===== Cucujiformia research =====
- A piece of Burmese amber preserving the complete series of free-living stages (except of the last larval instar) of a Cretaceous parasitoid beetle Paleoripiphorus is described by Batelka, Engel & Prokop (2021).

===== Elateriformia =====
====== New Elateriformian taxa ======
Name	Novelty	Status	Authors	Age	Type locality	Country	Notes	Images
Amberophytum maculatum	Sp. nov	Valid	Poinar, Vega & Legalov	Late Cretaceous (Cenomanian)	Burmese amber	Myanmar	A cerophytid rare click beetle.	
Anoeuma	Gen. et sp. nov	Valid	Li, Kundrata & Cai in Li et al.	Cretaceous (Albian to Cenomanian)	Burmese amber	Myanmar	An elateroid click beetle of uncertain phylogenetic placement. The type species is A. lawrencei.	
Arturmiles	Gen. et sp. nov	Valid	Fanti	Eocene	Prussian Formation (Baltic amber)	Poland	A soldier beetle belonging to the tribe Cantharini. The type species is A. pankowskiarum.	
Balistica vetai	Sp. nov	Valid	Muona	Eocene	Baltic amber	Europe	A Dirhagini Melasinae false click beetle.	
Baltodascillus	Gen. et sp. nov	Valid	Kundrata et al.	Eocene	Baltic amber	Russia (Kaliningrad Oblast)	A dascillid beetle. The type species is B. serraticornis.	
Burmagrilus	Gen. et sp. nov	Valid	Jiang, Song & Wang in Jiang et al.	Cretaceous	Burmese amber	Myanmar	A metallic wood-boring beetle. The type species is B. cretacus.	
Burmomiles bilineatimaculatus	Sp. nov	In press	Yang et al.	Cretaceous	Burmese amber	Myanmar	A soldier beetle. Fanti & Müller (2022) considered it to be a species belonging to the genus Elektrokleinia.	
Burmomiles laticollis	Sp. nov	In press	Yang et al.	Cretaceous	Burmese amber	Myanmar	A soldier beetle.	
Burmomiles oblongoculus	Sp. nov	In press	Yang et al.	Cretaceous	Burmese amber	Myanmar	A soldier beetle. Fanti & Müller (2022) considered it to be a species belonging to the genus Elektrokleinia.	
Captopus	Gen. et sp. nov	Valid	Li & Cai in Li, Huang & Cai	Cretaceous (Cenomanian)	Burmese amber	Myanmar	A throscid beetle. The type species is C. depressiceps.	
Chelonarium andabata	Sp. nov	Valid	Alekseev & Bukejs in Alekseev et al.	Eocene	Baltic amber	Russia (Kaliningrad Oblast)	A turtle beetle.	
Chelonarium dingansich	Sp. nov	Valid	Alekseev & Bukejs in Alekseev et al.	Eocene	Baltic amber	Russia (Kaliningrad Oblast)	A turtle beetle.	
Chelonarium dominicanum	Sp. nov	Valid	Poinar & Háva	Burdigalian	Dominican amber	Dominican Republic	A turtle beetle.	
Coomanius balticus	Sp. nov	Valid	Muona	Eocene	Baltic amber	Europe	A Nematodini Macraulacinae false click beetle.	
Cretocantharis	Gen. et sp. nov	Valid	Hsiao et al.	Late Cretaceous (Cenomanian)	Burmese amber	Myanmar	A soldier beetle. The type species is C. veda.	
Cretopachyderes	Gen. et sp. nov	Valid	Kundrata et al.	Cretaceous; Cenomanian	Burmese amber	Myanmar	An Agrypninae click beetle. The type species is C. burmitinus.	
Cretophengodes	Fam. nov., Gen. et sp. nov	Valid	Li, Kundrata, Tihelka & Cai in Li et al.	Cretaceous (Albian or Cenomanian)	Burmese amber	Myanmar	A cretophengodid elateroid beetle. The type species is C. azari.	
Dyscharachthis frickae	Sp. nov	Valid	Muona	Late Eocene; Priabonian	Baltic amber	Europe (Baltic Sea region)	A Dyscharachthini Eucneminae false click beetle.	
Electrothroscus	Gen. et sp. nov	Valid	Li & Cai	Cretaceous; Cenomanian	Burmese amber	Myanmar	A throscid false click beetle. The type species is E. yanpingae.	
Entomophthalmus antennalis	Sp. nov	Valid	Muona	Middle Eocene; Priabonian	Baltic amber	Europe (Baltic Sea region)	A Dirhagini Melasinae false click beetle.	
Erdaia bispinulosa	Sp. nov	Valid	Muona	Middle Eocene; Priabonian	Baltic amber	Europe	An Orodotini? Macraulacinae false click beetle.	
Erdaia longicornis	Sp. nov	Valid	Muona	Middle Eocene; Priabonian	Baltic amber	Europe	An Orodotini? Macraulacinae false click beetle.	
Erdaia longitarsis	Sp. nov	Valid	Muona	Middle Eocene; Priabonian	Baltic amber	Europe	An Orodotini? Macraulacinae false click beetle.	
Euryptychoides	Gen. et sp. nov	Valid	Muona	Middle Eocene; Priabonian	Baltic amber	Europe	An Euryptychini Macraulacinae false click beetle. The type species is E. magnus.	
Euryptychus decoratus	Sp. nov	Valid	Muona	Middle Eocene; Priabonian	Baltic amber	Europe	An Euryptychini Macraulacinae false click beetle.	
Euryptychus excavatus	Sp. nov	Valid	Muona	Middle Eocene; Priabonian	Baltic amber	Europe	An Euryptychini Macraulacinae false click beetle.	
Euryptychus helmwigae	Sp. nov	Valid	Muona	Middle Eocene; Priabonian	Baltic amber	Europe	An Euryptychini Macraulacinae false click beetle.	
Euryptychus sieglindae	Sp. nov	Valid	Muona	Middle Eocene; Priabonian	Baltic amber	Europe	An Euryptychini Macraulacinae false click beetle.	
Euryptychus waltrautae	Sp. nov	Valid	Muona	Middle Eocene; Priabonian	Baltic amber	Europe	An Euryptychini Macraulacinae false click beetle.	
Hukawngichthyurus maha	Sp. nov	Valid	Hsiao et al.	Late Cretaceous (Cenomanian)	Burmese amber	Myanmar	A soldier beetle.	
Isorhipis balticus	Sp. nov	Valid	Muona	Late Eocene; Priabonian	Baltic amber	Europe	An Isorhipis species melasine false click beetle	
Lycocerus crassepunctatus	Sp. nov	Valid	Kazantsev	Late Eocene; Priabonian	Baltic amber	Russia (Kaliningrad Oblast)	A soldier beetle.	
Malthodes aliger	Sp. nov	Valid	Kazantsev	Late Eocene; Priabonian	Baltic amber	Russia (Kaliningrad Oblast)	A soldier beetle	
Malthodes headsi	Sp. nov	Valid	Fanti	Late Eocene; Priabonian	Baltic amber	Poland	A soldier beetle.	
Malthodes jaredi	Sp. nov	Valid	Fanti	Late Eocene; Priabonian	Baltic amber	Poland	A soldier beetle, a species of Malthodes.	
Malthodes vladiceniensis	Sp. nov	Valid	Pintilioaie, Fanti & Ionesi	Middle Miocene	Bârnova-Muntele Formation	Romania	A soldier beetle.	
Microrhagus (Emyirhagus) vetai	Sp. nov	Valid	Muona	Late Eocene; Priabonian	Baltic amber	Europe	A Microrhagusspecies melasine false click beetle	
Murcybolus	Gen. et sp. nov	Valid	Li & Cai in Li et al.	Cretaceous; Cenomanian	Burmese amber	Myanmar	A Burmolycini dexorine net-winged beetle. The type species is M. longiantennus.	
Nematodes schwertleitae	Sp. nov	Valid	Muona	Middle Eocene; Priabonian	Baltic amber	Europe	A Nematodini Macraulacinae false click beetle.	
Neocharoides	Gen. et sp. nov	Valid	Muona	Middle Eocene; Priabonian	Baltic amber	Europe	A Nematodini? Macraulacinae false click beetle. The type species is N. balticus.	
Palaeocantharis	Gen. et sp. nov	Disputed	Hsiao et al.	Late Cretaceous (Cenomanian)	Burmese amber	Myanmar	A soldier beetle. The type species is P. panna. Fanti & Müller (2022) considered the genus Palaeocantharis to a be a junior synonym of the genus Elektrokleinia, though the authors maintained P. panna as a distinct species within the latter genus.	
Podistra guthriei	Sp. nov	Valid	Fanti	Late Eocene; Priabonian	Baltic amber	Poland	A soldier beetle.	
Poecilochrus balticus	Sp. nov	Valid	Muona	Late Eocene; Priabonian	Baltic amber	Europe	A Eucnemini Eucneminae false click beetle.	
Potergites brittoni	Sp. nov	Valid	Muona	Late Eocene; Priabonian	Baltic amber	Europe	A Dendrocharini Eucneminae false click beetle.	
Pseudomataeopsephus	Gen. et sp. nov	In press	Li, Huang & Cai	Cretaceous (Cenomanian)	Burmese amber	Myanmar	A water-penny beetle. The type species is P. burmensis.	
Pseudopactopus	Gen. et sp. nov	Valid	Li & Cai in Li, Huang & Cai	Cretaceous ( Cenomanian)	Burmese amber	Myanmar	A throscid false click beetle. The type species is P. robustus.	
Ptilodactyla eocenica	Sp. nov	Valid	Kundrata, Bukejs & Blank in Kundrata et al.	Late Eocene; Priabonian	Baltic amber	Russia (Kaliningrad Oblast)	APtilodactyla species toe winged beetle.	
Rhacopus balticus	Sp. nov	Valid	Muona	Late Eocene; Priabonian	Baltic amber	Europe	A Rhacopus species eucnemid false click beetle	
Rhagomicrus balticus	Sp. nov	Valid	Muona	Late Eocene; Priabonian	Baltic amber	Europe	A Dirhagini Melasinae false click beetle.	
Rheanischia	Gen. et sp. nov		Li, Chang & Muona	Early Cretaceous (Hauterivian to Aptian)	Yixian Formation	China	An Anischiinae false click beetle. The type species is R. brevicornis.	
Silis curleri	Sp. nov	Valid	Fanti & Pankowski	Burdigalian	Dominican amber	Dominican Republic	A species of Silis.	
Silis hegnai	Sp. nov	Valid	Fanti & Pankowski	Burdigalian	Dominican amber	Dominican Republic	A species of Silis.	
Xylophilus balticus	Sp. nov	Valid	Muona	Late Eocene; Priabonian	Baltic amber	Europe	A Xylophilus species eucnemid false click beetle.	

====== Elateriformia research ======
- A study on the anatomy and phylogenetic relationships of Archaeolus funestus is published by Li et al. (2021).
- A study on the morphological diversity of larvae of extant and fossil members of the family Brachypsectridae is published by Haug et al. (2021).

===== Scarabaeiformia =====
Name	Novelty	Status	Authors	Age	Type locality	Country	Notes	Images
Goriresina	Gen. et sp. nov	Valid	Matalin, Perkovsky & Vasilenko	Late Eocene; Priabonian	Rovno amber	Ukraine	A tiger beetle. The type species is G. fungifora.	
Onthophagus pilauco	Sp. nov	Valid	Tello et al.	Late Pleistocene	Pilauco Bajo	Chile	A scarab beetle.	

===== Staphyliniformia =====
Name	Novelty	Status	Authors	Age	Type locality	Country	Notes	Images
Acritus sutirca	Sp. nov	Valid	Alekseev & Bukejs	Eocene	Baltic amber	Russia (Kaliningrad Oblast)	A species of Acritus.	
Bacanius gorskii	Sp. nov	Valid	Alekseev & Bukejs	Eocene	Baltic amber	Poland	A species of Bacanius.	
Burmagluta	Gen. et sp. nov	Valid	Yin & Cai	Cretaceous	Burmese amber	Myanmar	A Brachyglutini Pselaphinae rove beetle. The type species is B. rougemonti.	
Carinumerus	Gen. et sp. nov	Valid	Caterino	Cretaceous	Burmese amber	Myanmar	An Onthophilinae clown beetle. The type species is C. maddisoni.	
Charhyphus serratus	Sp. nov	In press	Yamamoto & Shavrin	Eocene	Baltic amber	Europe	A Phloeocharinae rove beetle.	
Cretosaja	Gen. et sp. nov	In press	Sohn & Nam	Early Cretaceous	Jinju Formation	South Korea	A carrion beetle. The type species is C. jinjuensis.	
Druantia	Gen. et sp. nov	Valid	Caterino	Cenomianian	Burmese amber	Myanmar	A Dendrophilinae clown beetle. The type species is D. aeterna.	
Euconnus nathani	Sp. nov	Valid	Jałoszyński & Perkovsky	Eocene	Rovno amber	Ukraine	A Euconnus species Scydmaeninae rove beetle.	
Eusphalerum bukejsi	Sp. nov	Valid	Shavrin in Shavrin & Kairišs	Eocene	Baltic amber	Russia (Kaliningrad Oblast)	A Eusphalerum species Omaliinae rove beetle.	
Megabythinus	Gen. et sp. nov	Valid	Yin, Zhao & Cai	Cretaceous; Cenomanian	Burmese amber	Myanmar	A Bythinini Pselaphinae rove beetle. The type species is M. spinitibialis.	
Paroxyporus	Gen. et sp. nov	Valid	Cai	Early Cretaceous	Yixian Formation	China	A rove beetle. The type species is P. fossilis.	
Phasmister	Gen. et sp. nov	Valid	Caterino	Cretaceous	Burmese amber	Myanmar	An Onthophilinae clown beetle. The type species is P. cristatus.	
Ponohydrochus	Gen. et sp. nov	Valid	Prokin & Strelnikova	Early Cretaceous (Hauterivian)		Russia	A water scavenger beetle. The type species is P. buryaticus.	
Proptomaphaginus alleni	Sp. nov	Valid	Perreau & Haelewaters in Perreau, Haelewaters & Tafforeau	Miocene; Burdigalian	Dominican amber	Dominican Republic	A Ptomaphagini round fungus beetle.	
Trichophya minor	Sp. nov	Valid	Yamamoto & Newton	Cretaceous (Cenomanian)	Burmese amber	Myanmar	A Trichophya species Trichophyinae rove beetle.	
Yethiha	Gen. et sp. nov	Valid	Caterino	Cretaceous	Burmese amber	Myanmar	A Dendrophilinae clown beetle. The type species is Y. peregrina.	

==== other Coleopteran research ====
- A study on the evolution of beetles from the Early Permian to Middle Triassic, evaluating the impact of the Permian–Triassic extinction event on beetle diversity, is published by Zhao et al. (2021).
- Revision of Notocupes undatabdominus and N. ? multituberatus from the Lower Cretaceous of South China is published by Li, Huang & Cai (2021), who argue that both species do not belong to the genus Notocupes, transfer N. ? multituberatus to the genus Lasiosyne, and consider "N." undatabdominus to be likely a member of the family Artematopodidae.
- The oldest solid wood-borer larvae reported to date (belonging to the families Buprestidae and possibly Cerambycidae) are described from the Cretaceous amber from Myanmar by Haug et al. (2021).
- Mitochondrial genomes and nuclear ribosomal DNA of beetles, in some cases identifiable to species, are recovered from pack rat middens from California (United States) and Baja California (Mexico) dating up to ~ 34,355 years before present by Smith et al. (2021).

== Clade Dictyoptera ==
=== New Dictyopteran taxa ===
Name	Novelty	Status	Authors	Age	Type locality	Country	Notes	Images
Afrophaga	Gen. et sp. nov	In press	Vršanský et al.	Cretaceous (Hauterivian?)		Algeria	A cockroach belonging to the family Corydiidae. Genus includes new species A. extincta.	
Alienopterix mlynskyi	Sp. nov	In press	Sendi in Vršanský et al.	Cretaceous	Burmese amber	Myanmar	An alienopterid.	
Alienopterix smidovae	Sp. nov	In press	Hinkelman in Vršanský et al.	Cretaceous	Burmese amber	Myanmar	An alienopterid.	
Arceotermes	Fam. et gen. et sp. nov	Valid	Engel & Jiang in Jiang et al.	Cretaceous	Burmese amber	Myanmar	A termite belonging to the new family Arceotermitidae. Genus includes new species A. hospitis.	
Caligoptera	Gen. et sp. nov	In press	Sendi	Late Cretaceous (Cenomanian)	Burmese amber	Myanmar	A cockroach belonging to the family Ectobiidae. Genus includes new species C. hinkelmani.	
Chuanblatta	Gen. et 2 sp. nov	In press	Liang et al.	Middle Jurassic	Jiulongshan Formation	China	A cockroach belonging to the family Raphidiomimidae. Genus includes new species C. huntianlingensis and C. lata.	
Cuniculoblatta	Gen. et sp. nov	In press	Hinkelman	Cretaceous	Burmese amber	Myanmar	A cockroach. Genus includes new species C. brevialata .	
Ectoovia	Gen. et sp. nov	In press	Sendi	Late Cretaceous (Cenomanian)	Burmese amber	Myanmar	A cockroach belonging to the family Ectobiidae. Genus includes new species E. protecta.	
? Elisama algeriaensis	Sp. nov	In press	Vršanský et al.	Cretaceous (Hauterivian?)		Algeria	A member of the family Blattulidae.	
Eminespina	Gen. et sp. nov	Valid	Chen, Zhang Shi	Late Cretaceous (Cenomanian)	Burmese amber	Myanmar	An alienopterid. Genus includes new species E. burma.	
Fractalia	Fam. et gen. et 2 sp. nov	Valid	Hinkelman & Vršanský in Vršanský et al.	Late Jurassic–Late Cretaceous (Kimmeridgian–Cenomanian)	Burmese amber	Germany; Kazakhstan; Myanmar	A member of Corydioidea, the type genus of the new family Fractaliidae Vršanský & Hinkelman. The type species is F. articulata Hinkelman; genus also includes new species F. aristovi Vršanský.	
Fragosublatta	Gen. et sp. nov	Valid	Chen, Shih & Ren in Chen et al.	Late Cretaceous (Cenomanian)	Burmese amber	Myanmar	A cockroach belonging to the family Corydiidae. The type species is F. pectinata.	
Glyptotermes abyssinicus	Sp. nov	Valid	Bouju, Jouault & Perrichot	Early Miocene	Ethiopian amber	Ethiopia	A termite belonging to the family Kalotermitidae.	
Kinneyblatta	Gen. et sp. nov	Valid	Schneider et al.	Carboniferous (Kasimovian)	Atrasado Formation	United States (New Mexico)	A member of Blattodea belonging to the family Spiloblattinidae. The type species is K. huberi.	
Kriedoblatta	Gen. et sp. nov	In press	Vršanský et al.	Cretaceous (Hauterivian?)		Algeria	A member of the family Liberiblattinidae. Genus includes new species K. gondwanensis.	
? Kurablattina samsonovi	Sp. nov	In press	Vršanský et al.	Cretaceous (Hauterivian?)		Algeria	A member of the family Liberiblattinidae.	
Labradormantis	Gen. et sp. nov	Valid	Demers-Potvin et al.	Late Cretaceous (Cenomanian)	Redmond Formation	Canada	A praying mantis belonging to the family Baissomantidae. Genus includes new species L. guilbaulti.	
Latiblattella basaltica	Sp. nov	In press	Vršanský, Poschmann & Vidlička	Late Oligocene		Germany	A species of Latiblattella.	
Latiblattella karlgruberi	Sp. nov	In press	Sendi	Late Cretaceous (Cenomanian)	Burmese amber	Myanmar		
Laticephalana	Gen. et sp. nov	Valid	Luo et al.	Cretaceous	Burmese amber	Myanmar	A member of the family Umenocoleidae. Genus includes new species L. liuyani.	
Lukotermes	Gen. et sp. nov	Valid	Perkovsky & Nel	Eocene (Priabonian)	Rovno amber	Ukraine	A termite belonging to the family Rhinotermitidae. Genus includes new species L. milescaput.	
Meiatermes cretacicus	Sp. nov	In press	Bezerra et al.	Early Cretaceous	Crato Formation	Brazil	A termite.	
Meloblatta	Gen. et sp. nov	In press	Vršanský et al.	Cretaceous (Hauterivian?)		Algeria	A member of the family Mesoblattinidae. Genus includes new species M. brezinica.	
Milesitermes	Gen. et sp. nov	Valid	Jouault et al.	Cretaceous	Burmese amber	Myanmar	A termite belonging to the family Mastotermitidae. Genus includes new species M. engeli.	
Miniblattina	Gen. et sp. nov	In press	Sendi	Early Cretaceous (Barremian)	Lebanese amber	Lebanon	A cockroach belonging to the family Liberiblattinidae. Genus includes new species M. libera.	
Mongolblatta sendii	Sp. nov	In press	Hinkelman	Cretaceous	Burmese amber	Myanmar	A member of the family Mesoblattinidae.	
Morphna cenozoica	Sp. nov	In press	Šmídová, Vidlička & Wedmann	Eocene	Messel pit	Germany	A cockroach belonging to the family Blaberidae.	
Morphna cretacica	Sp. nov	In press	Šmídová, Vidlička & Wedmann	Cretaceous	Burmese amber	Myanmar	A cockroach belonging to the family Blaberidae.	
Nadveruzenie	Gen. et sp. nov	In press	Vršanský, Hinkelman & Sendi in Vršanský et al.	Cretaceous	Burmese amber	Myanmar	An alienopterid. Genus includes new species N. postava.	
Nodosigalea simplivena	Sp. nov	Valid	Šmídová	Cretaceous	Burmese amber	Myanmar	A cockroach belonging to the family Corydiidae.	
Ocelloblattula margarita	Sp. nov	Valid	Koubová & Vršanský in Vršanský et al.	Late Cretaceous (Cenomanian)	Burmese amber	Myanmar	A member of Corydioidea.	
Olenablatta	Gen. et sp. nov	Valid	Šmídová	Cretaceous	Burmese amber	Myanmar	A cockroach; originally assigned to the family Olidae, but subsequently transferred to the family Corydiidae. Genus includes new species O. vrsanskyi.	
Otazka	Gen. et sp. nov	In press	Vršanský et al.	Cretaceous (Hauterivian?)		Algeria	A member of the family Mesoblattinidae. Genus includes new species O. systematicka.	
Pabuonqed magna	Sp. nov	In press	Song et al.	Cretaceous	Burmese amber	Myanmar	A member of Mastotermitoidea belonging to the family Pabuonqedidae.	
Paekthoblatta	Gen. et sp. nov	Valid	So et al.	Early Cretaceous	Sinuiju Formation	North Korea	A member of the family Raphidiomimidae. Genus includes new species P. coreanica.	
Periplaneta (?) perialla	Sp. nov	Valid	Anisyutkin & Perkovsky	Eocene	Rovno amber	Ukraine	A cockroach, possibly a species of Periplaneta.	
Petropterix fukuiensis	Sp. nov	In press	Oyama, Yukawa & Imai	Early Cretaceous	Kitadani Formation	Japan	A member of the family Umenocoleidae.	
Praeblattella arcuata	Sp. nov	In press	Oyama, Yukawa & Imai	Early Cretaceous	Kitadani Formation	Japan	A member of the family Mesoblattinidae.	
Praeblattella inexpecta	Sp. nov	In press	Oyama, Yukawa & Imai	Early Cretaceous	Kitadani Formation	Japan	A member of the family Mesoblattinidae.	
Pseudomantina	Gen. et 2 sp. nov	Valid	Sendi & Vršanský in Vršanský et al.	Late Jurassic–Early Cretaceous (Kimmeridgian–Barremian)	Lebanese amber	Kazakhstan; Lebanon	A member of the family Liberiblattinidae. The type species is P. occisor Sendi; genus also includes new species P. nigroalba Vršanský.	
Reticulitermes grimaldii	Sp. nov	Valid	Jouault et al.	Eocene	Baltic amber	Europe (Baltic Sea region)	A termite, a species of Reticulitermes.	
Sajda	Gen. et sp. nov	Junior homonym	Vršanský et al.	Cretaceous (Hauterivian?)		Algeria	A member of Holocompsinae. Genus includes new species S. equatorialis. The generic name is preoccupied by Sajda Dworakowska (1981); Jiang, Xing & Li (2023) coined a replacement name Vrsanskysajda.	
Spinaeblattina baekthoensis	Sp. nov	Valid	So et al.	Early Cretaceous	Sinuiju Formation	North Korea	A member of the family Mesoblattinidae.	
Stavba delicata	Sp. nov	In press	Sendi	Late Cretaceous (Cenomanian)	Burmese amber	Myanmar	A cockroach belonging to the family Liberiblattinidae.	
Stavba magnoculara	Sp. nov	In press	Sendi	Late Cretaceous (Cenomanian)	Burmese amber	Myanmar	A cockroach belonging to the family Liberiblattinidae.	
Tanytermitalis	Gen. et sp. nov	Valid	Engel & Cai in Jiang et al.	Cretaceous	Burmese amber	Myanmar	A termite belonging to the family Tanytermitidae. Genus includes new species T. philetaerus.	

=== Dictyopteran research ===
- A study on the phylogenetic placement of the family Umenocoleidae, based on data from a new specimen of Umenocoleus sinuatus from the Lower Cretaceous Zhonggou Formation (China), is published by Liuo et al. (2021).
- Description of new alienopterid nymphs from the Cretaceous Burmese amber, and a study on life history and affinities of alienopterids, is published by Luo et al. (2021).
- A study on the sensory organs of Huablattula hui, and on their implications for the knowledge of the ecology of this cockroach, is published by Taniguchi et al. (2021).

== Clade †Glosselytrodea ==
Name	Novelty	Status	Authors	Age	Type locality	Country	Notes	Images
Moltenojurina	Gen. et sp. nov	Valid	Béthoux & Anderson	Late Triassic (Carnian)	Molteno Formation	South Africa	A polycytellid Glosselytrodean. The type species is M. parva.	
Polycytella rasnitsyni	Sp. nov	Valid	Béthoux & Anderson	Late Triassic (Carnian)	Molteno Formation	South Africa	A polycytellid Glosselytrodea.	

== Hymenopterans ==
=== New Hymenopteran taxa ===
Name	Novelty	Status	Authors	Age	Type locality	Country	Notes	Images
Aethemelikertes	Gen. et sp. nov	Valid	Engel in Engel & Davis	Eocene	Baltic amber	Russia (Kaliningrad Oblast)	A bee belonging to the tribe Melikertini. The type species is A. emunctorii.	
Alivespa gracilenta	Sp. nov	In press	Wu et al.	Cretaceous	Burmese amber	Myanmar	A member of the family Vespidae.	
Allommation	Fam. nov., Gen. et 3 sp. nov	Valid	Rosa & Melo	Late Cretaceous (Cenomanian)	Burmese amber	Myanmar	A member of Apoidea in the new family Allommationidae. Genus includes new species A. procerum, A. elongatum and A. grande.	
Amelikertotes	Gen. et comb. nov	Valid	Engel in Engel & Davis	Eocene	Baltic amber Bitterfeld amber	Germany; Russia (Kaliningrad Oblast)	A bee belonging to the tribe Melikertini. The type species is "Melikertes" clypeatus Engel (2001).	
Ammosphecium	Gen. et sp. nov	Valid	Rosa & Melo	Late Cretaceous (Cenomanian)	Burmese amber	Myanmar	A member of Crabroninae. Genus includes new species A. diabolicum.	
Anochetus miosumatrensis	Sp. nov	Valid	Ngô-Muller, Garrouste & Nel in Ngô-Muller et al.	Miocene		Indonesia	An ant, a species of Anochetus.	
Archaeovespa incompleta	Sp. nov	In press	Wu et al.	Cretaceous	Burmese amber	Myanmar	A member of the family Vespidae.	
Archeonesia	Gen. et sp. nov	Valid	Tribull, Pankowski & Colombo	Eocene	Baltic amber	Russia (Kaliningrad Oblast)	A Pristocerinae Bethylid. The type species is A. eocena.	Archeonesia eocena
Arkadiserphus	Gen. et sp. nov	Valid	Rasnitsyn	Late Jurassic	Karabastau Formation	Kazakhstan	A member of Proctotrupoidea belonging to the family Peleserphidae. The type species is A. leleji.	
Ascogaster (Syntaphus) latitibialis	Sp. nov	Valid	Belokobylskij et al.	Eocene	Baltic amber	Europe (Baltic Sea region)	A member of the family Braconidae belonging to the subfamily Cheloninae.	
Aulacicosmus	Gen. et sp. nov	Valid	Rosa & Melo	Late Cretaceous (Cenomanian)	Burmese amber	Myanmar	A member of the family Heterogynaidae. Genus includes new species A. setosus.	
Austroplebeia fujianica	Sp. nov	Valid	Engel in Engel et al.	Miocene (Langhian)	Zhangpu amber	China	A stingless bee, a species of Austroplebeia.	
Burmabracon	Gen. et 2 sp. nov	Valid	Li et al.	Cretaceous	Burmese amber	Myanmar	A member of the family Braconidae belonging to the subfamily Protorhyssalinae. Genus includes new species B. gracilens and B. grossus.	
Burmapyris	Gen. et sp. nov	Valid	Jouault, Perrichot & Nel	Cretaceous (Albian-Cenomanian)	Burmese amber	Myanmar	A member of the family Bethylidae belonging to the subfamily Lancepyrinae. Genus includes new species B. azevedoi.	
Burmoxyela	Gen. et sp. nov	Valid	Zheng et al.	Late Cretaceous (Cenomanian)	Burmese amber	Myanmar	A sawfly belonging to the family Syspastoxyelidae. Genus includes new species B. lii.	
Burmusculus angustus	Sp. nov	In press	Li et al.	Cretaceous	Burmese amber	Myanmar	A member of Apocrita belonging to the family Burmusculidae.	
Buserphites	Gen. et 2 sp. nov	In press	Herbert & McKellar	Cretaceous	Burmese amber	Myanmar	A member of the family Serphitidae. Genus includes new species B. applanatus and B. myanmarensis.	
Chainochora	Gen. et sp. nov	Valid	Chen, van Achterberg & Hong	Late Cretaceous (Cenomanian)	Burmese amber	Myanmar	A member of the family Braconidae belonging to the subfamily Protobraconinae. The type species is C. syntoma.	
Chlorepyris deploegi	Sp. nov	Valid	Colombo & Azevedo in Colombo et al.	Eocene (Priabonian)	Rovno amber	Ukraine	A member of the family Bethylidae.	
Chlorepyris engeli	Sp. nov	Valid	Colombo & Azevedo in Colombo et al.	Eocene (Priabonian)	Baltic amber	Russia	A member of the family Bethylidae.	
Chlorepyris hopei	Sp. nov	Valid	Colombo & Azevedo in Colombo et al.	Eocene (Priabonian)	Baltic amber	Russia	A member of the family Bethylidae.	
Chlorepyris jouaulti	Sp. nov	Valid	Colombo & Azevedo in Colombo et al.	Eocene (Priabonian)	Rovno amber	Ukraine	A member of the family Bethylidae.	
Chlorepyris mckellari	Sp. nov	Valid	Colombo & Azevedo in Colombo et al.	Eocene (Priabonian)	Rovno amber	Ukraine	A member of the family Bethylidae.	
Chlorepyris meunieri	Sp. nov	Valid	Colombo & Azevedo in Colombo et al.	Eocene (Priabonian)	Baltic amber	Russia	A member of the family Bethylidae.	
Chlorepyris neli	Sp. nov	Valid	Colombo & Azevedo in Colombo et al.	Eocene (Priabonian)	Baltic amber Rovno amber	Russia; Ukraine	A member of the family Bethylidae.	
Chlorepyris perrichoti	Sp. nov	Valid	Colombo & Azevedo in Colombo et al.	Eocene (Priabonian)	Baltic amber	Russia	A member of the family Bethylidae.	
Christophus	Gen. et 2 sp. nov	In press	Brazidec et al.	Late Cretaceous (Cenomanian)	Burmese amber	Myanmar	A member of the family Diapriidae. Genus includes new species C. myanmarensis and C. ohmkuhnlei.	
Cretastatus	Gen. et sp. nov	Valid	Rosa & Melo	Late Cretaceous (Cenomanian)	Burmese amber	Myanmar	A member of Astatinae. Genus includes new species C. longevus.	
Cretorussus	Gen. et sp. nov	In press	Jouault, Perrichot & Nel	Cretaceous	Burmese amber	Myanmar	A member of Orussoidea. Genus includes new species C. vilhelmseni.	
Curiosivespa sennlaubi	Sp. nov	Valid	Jouault, Rasnitsyn & Nel in Jouault et al.	Early Cretaceous	Crato Formation	Brazil	A member of the family Vespidae.	
Diameneura	Gen. et sp. nov	In press	Santer & Álvarez-Parra in Santer et al.	Early Cretaceous (Albian)	Escucha Formation	Spain	A member of the family Spathiopterygidae. The type species is D. marveni.	
Drymomyrmex rasnitsyni	Sp. nov	Valid	Radchenko	Late Eocene	Rovno amber	Ukraine	An ant belonging to the subfamily Formicinae.	
Elasmosomites arkadyleleji	Sp. nov	Valid	Belokobylskij in Belokobylskij et al.	Eocene	Baltic amber	Europe (Baltic Sea region)	A member of the family Braconidae belonging to the subfamily Euphorinae.	
Electrofoenops exaltatus	Sp. nov	In press	Li et al.	Cretaceous	Burmese amber	Myanmar	A member of the family Aulacidae.	
Embolemus brachypterus	Sp. nov	Valid	Olmi et al.	Cretaceous	Burmese amber	Myanmar	A member of the family Embolemidae.	
Embolemus micropterus	Sp. nov	Valid	Olmi et al.	Cretaceous	Burmese amber	Myanmar	A member of the family Embolemidae.	
Eopelecinus marechali	Sp. nov	Valid	Jouault	Late Cretaceous (Cenomanian)	Burmese amber	Myanmar	A member of the family Pelecinidae.	
Eoteredon	Gen. et sp. nov	Valid	Archibald, Aase & Nel	Early Eocene	Green River Formation	United States (Wyoming)	A horntail. Genus includes new species E. lacoi.	
Ephedrus rasnitsyni	Sp. nov	Valid	Davidian & Kaliuzhna in Davidian, Kaliuzhna & Perkovsky	Middle Eocene	Sakhalinian amber	Russia	A member of the family Braconidae belonging to the subfamily Aphidiinae.	
Exilaulacus advenus	Sp. nov	In press	Li et al.	Cretaceous	Burmese amber	Myanmar	A member of the family Aulacidae.	
Exilaulacus eximius	Sp. nov	In press	Li et al.	Cretaceous	Burmese amber	Myanmar	A member of the family Aulacidae.	
Formica ribbeckei	Sp. nov	Valid	Radchenko & Perkovsky in Radchenko, Perkovsky & Vasilenko	Late Eocene	Rovno amber	Ukraine	An ant, a species of Formica.	
Glenocephalus	Gen. et sp. nov	Valid	Rosa & Melo	Late Cretaceous (Cenomanian)	Burmese amber	Myanmar	A member of Apoidea in the new family Cirrosphecidae. Genus includes new species G. mandibularis.	
Gloxinius	Gen. et comb. nov	Valid	Colombo & Azevedo in Colombo et al.	Eocene (Priabonian)	Baltic amber	Russia	A member of the family Bethylidae; a new genus for "Epyris" bifossatus Brues (1939).	
Grandixyela	Gen. et sp. nov	Valid	Zheng in Zheng et al.	Cretaceous	Burmese amber	Myanmar	A member of the family Syspastoxyelidae. The type species is G. rasnitsyni.	
Haidomelikertes	Gen. et sp. nov	Valid	Engel in Engel & Davis	Eocene	Baltic amber	Russia (Kaliningrad Oblast)	A bee belonging to the tribe Melikertini. The type species is H. uraeus.	
Haptodioctes	Gen. et sp. nov	Valid	Rosa & Melo	Late Cretaceous (Cenomanian)	Burmese amber	Myanmar	A member of Apoidea in the new family Cirrosphecidae. Genus includes new species H. apiformis.	
Helosericus	Gen. et sp. nov	Valid	Rosa & Melo	Late Cretaceous (Cenomanian)	Burmese amber	Myanmar	A member of Psenini. Genus includes new species H. verrucosus.	
Heteroichneumon	Gen. et sp. nov	Valid	Kopylov, Zhang & Zhang	Cretaceous	Burmese amber	Myanmar	A member of the family Ichneumonidae. The type species is H. rasnitsyni.	
Heteropimpla pulverulenta	Sp. nov	Valid	Kopylov, Zhang & Zhang	Cretaceous	Burmese amber	Myanmar	A member of the family Ichneumonidae.	
Holepyris rasnitsyni	Sp. nov	Valid	Colombo & Azevedo in Colombo et al.	Eocene (Priabonian)	Baltic amber	Russia	A member of the family Bethylidae.	
Holepyris terayamai	Sp. nov	Valid	Colombo & Azevedo in Colombo et al.	Eocene (Priabonian)	Rovno amber	Ukraine	A member of the family Bethylidae.	
Holopsenella antiqua	Sp. nov	In press	Lepeco & Melo	Cretaceous	Burmese amber	Myanmar	A member of Aculeata of uncertain phylogenetic placement.	
Holopsenella burmitica	Sp. nov	In press	Lepeco & Melo	Cretaceous	Burmese amber	Myanmar	A member of Aculeata of uncertain phylogenetic placement.	
Holopsenella gothica	Sp. nov	In press	Lepeco & Melo	Cretaceous	Burmese amber	Myanmar	A member of Aculeata of uncertain phylogenetic placement.	
Hybristodryinus castaneus	Sp. nov	Valid	Olmi, Guglielmino & Chen in Olmi et al.	Late Cretaceous (Cenomanian)	Burmese amber	Myanmar	A member of the family Dryinidae.	
Hybristodryinus viriosus	Sp. nov	Valid	Wang et al.	Late Cretaceous (Cenomanian)	Burmese amber	Myanmar	A member of the family Dryinidae.	
Hybristodryinus zaifui	Sp. nov	Valid	Chen, Olmi & Perkovsky in Olmi et al.	Late Cretaceous (Cenomanian)	Burmese amber	Myanmar	A member of the family Dryinidae.	
Janzenella theia	Sp. nov	Valid	Bremer & Talamas in Bremer, van de Kamp & Talamas	Eocene	Baltic amber	Russia (Kaliningrad Oblast)	A species of Janzenella.	
Karataus ryonsangensis	Sp. nov	In press	Won & So	Early Cretaceous (Barremian–Aptian)	Sinuiju Formation	North Korea	A wasp belonging to the family Ephialtitidae.	
Keratodellitha	Gen. et 3 sp. nov	Valid	Jouault et al.	Cretaceous	Burmese amber	Myanmar	A member of Evanioidea belonging to the family Othniodellithidae. Genus includes new species K. anubis, K. basilisci and K. kirin.	
Kleistochora	Gen. et sp. nov	Valid	Chen, van Achterberg & Hong	Late Cretaceous (Cenomanian)	Burmese amber	Myanmar	A member of the family Braconidae belonging to the subfamily Protobraconinae. The type species is K. dolichura.	
Lelejus	Gen. et sp. nov	Valid	Radchenko & Proshchalykin	Late Eocene	Rovno amber	Ukraine	An ant belonging to the subfamily Myrmicinae. The type species is L. venustus.	
Lonchodryinus groehni	Sp. nov	Valid	Olmi et al.	Late Eocene	Baltic amber	Europe (Baltic Sea region)	A member of the family Dryinidae.	
Mael	Gen. et comb. nov	Valid	Colombo & Azevedo in Colombo et al.	Eocene (Priabonian)	Baltic amber	Russia	A member of the family Bethylidae belonging to the subfamily Scleroderminae; a new genus for "Calyoza" longiceps Brues (1923).	
Megalyrhyssalus	Gen. et sp. nov	Valid	Belokobylskij & Jouault	Late Cretaceous (Cenomanian)	Burmese amber	Myanmar	A member of the family Braconidae. Genus includes new species M. clavicornis.	
Megarolium	Gen. et sp. nov	Valid	Rosa & Melo	Late Cretaceous (Cenomanian)	Burmese amber	Myanmar	A member of Bembicinae. Genus includes new species M. paradoxum.	
Merascylla	Gen. et comb. nov	Valid	Colombo & Azevedo in Colombo et al.	Late Cretaceous (Cenomanian)	Burmese amber	Myanmar	A member of the family Bethylidae belonging to the subfamily Pristocerinae; a new genus for "Epyris" atavellus Cockerell (1920).	
Mesoserphites	Gen. et 5 sp. nov	In press	Herbert & McKellar	Cretaceous	Burmese amber	Myanmar	A member of the family Serphitidae. Genus includes new species M. annulus, M. giganteus, M. engeli, M. scutatus and M. viraneacapitis.	
Meteorus arasnitsyni	Sp. nov	Valid	Belokobylskij et al.	Eocene	Baltic amber	Europe (Baltic Sea region)	A species of Meteorus.	
Microtypus eocenus	Sp. nov	Valid	Belokobylskij et al.	Eocene	Rovno amber	Ukraine	A member of the family Braconidae belonging to the subfamily Microtypinae.	
Mintara	Gen. et sp. nov	In press	Brazidec et al.	Late Cretaceous (Cenomanian)	Burmese amber	Myanmar	A member of the family Diapriidae. Genus includes new species M. parva.	
Odontosericus	Gen. et sp. nov	Valid	Rosa & Melo	Late Cretaceous (Cenomanian)	Burmese amber	Myanmar	A member of Psenini. Genus includes new species O. burmensis.	
Orthosyntexis	Gen. et 2 sp. nov	Valid	Gao, Engel, Shih, Gao in Gao et al.	Cretaceous	Burmese amber	Myanmar	A member of the family Anaxyelidae. The type species is O. elegans; genus also includes O. thanti.	
Palaeocolastes	Gen. et sp. nov	Valid	Belokobylskij et al.	Eocene	Baltic amber	Europe (Baltic Sea region)	A member of the family Braconidae belonging to the subfamily Exothecinae. The type species is P. bruesi.	
Paleoaulacus	Gen. et sp. nov	Valid	Jouault & Nel	Late Cretaceous (Cenomanian)	Burmese amber	Myanmar	A member of the family Aulacidae. Genus includes new species P. minutus.	
Paleoxyela	Gen. et sp. nov	Valid	Jouault, Aase & Nel	Eocene (Chadronian)	Florissant Formation	United States (Colorado)	A member of the family Xyelidae. The type species is P. nearctica.	
Peleserphus qufuensis	Sp. nov	In press	Yu et al.	Late Cretaceous (Cenomanian)	Burmese amber	Myanmar	A member of the family Peleserphidae.	
Pheidole pauchil	Sp. nov	Valid	Varela-Hernández & Riquelme	Miocene	Mexican amber	Mexico	An ant, a species of Pheidole.	
Pinguixyela	Gen. et comb. nov	Valid	Zheng et al.	Late Cretaceous (Cenomanian)	Burmese amber	Myanmar	A sawfly belonging to the family Syspastoxyelidae; a new genus for "Syspastoxyela" pinguis.	
Platyxyela tenuis	Sp. nov	Valid	Zheng et al.	Middle Jurassic (Callovian-Bathonian boundary)	Jiulongshan Formation	China	A member of the family Xyelidae.	
Pompilopterus ryonsangensis	Sp. nov	In press	Won & So	Early Cretaceous (Barremian–Aptian)	Sinuiju Formation	North Korea	A wasp belonging to the family Angarosphecidae.	
Pristinopterus	Gen. et sp. nov	Valid	Rosa & Melo	Late Cretaceous (Cenomanian)	Burmese amber	Myanmar	A member of Bembicinae. Genus includes new species P. spectabilis.	
Pristopsen	Gen. et sp. nov	Valid	Rosa & Melo	Late Cretaceous (Cenomanian)	Burmese amber	Myanmar	A member of Psenini. Genus includes new species P. obscurus.	
Prosyntexis sennlaubi	Sp. nov	Valid	Jouault & Nel	Early Cretaceous (Aptian)	Crato Formation	Brazil	A member of the family Sepulcidae.	
Protopyris	Gen. et sp. nov	Valid	Jouault & Nel in Jouault, Perrichot & Nel	Early Cretaceous (Albian)	Hkamti amber	Myanmar	A member of the family Bethylidae belonging to the subfamily Lancepyrinae. Genus includes new species P. myanmarensis.	
Prototeleia	Gen. et sp. nov	Valid	Talamas et al.	Late Cretaceous (Cenomanian)	Burmese amber	Myanmar	A member of the family Platygastridae. The type species is P. kleio.	
Proxyelia	Gen. et sp. nov	Valid	Jouault, Aase & Nel	Eocene (Ypresian)	Green River Formation	United States (Wyoming)	A member of the family Xyelidae. The type species is P. pankowskii.	
Ptilocosmus	Gen. et sp. nov	Valid	Rosa & Melo	Late Cretaceous (Cenomanian)	Burmese amber	Myanmar	A member of the family Heterogynaidae. Genus includes new species P. corniculatus.	
Ramageoptera	Gen. et sp. nov	Valid	Jouault & Brazidec	Cretaceous	Burmese amber	Myanmar	A member of the family Bethylidae belonging to the subfamily Protopristocerinae. Genus includes new species R. platycephala.	
Rasnichneumon	Gen. et 2 sp. nov	Valid	Kopylov, Zhang & Zhang	Cretaceous	Burmese amber	Myanmar	A member of the family Ichneumonidae. The type species is R. alexandri; genus also includes R. gracilis.	
Rasnitsynum	Gen. et sp. nov	Valid	Olmi et al.	Cretaceous	Burmese amber	Myanmar	A member of the family Dryinidae. Genus includes new species R. burmense.	
Rogichneumon	Gen. et sp. nov	Valid	Kopylov, Zhang & Zhang	Cretaceous	Burmese amber	Myanmar	A member of the family Ichneumonidae. The type species is R. braconidicus.	
Rovenosa alexrasnitsyni	Sp. nov	Valid	Manukyan in Manukyan & Zhindarev	Late Eocene	Prussian Formation (Baltic amber)	Russia (Kaliningrad Oblast)	A member of the family Ichneumonidae.	
Rovenosa khalaimi	Sp. nov	Valid	Manukyan in Manukyan & Zhindarev	Late Eocene	Prussian Formation (Baltic amber)	Russia (Kaliningrad Oblast)	A member of the family Ichneumonidae.	
Sakhalinencyrtus	Gen. et sp. nov	Valid	Simutnik in Simutnik, Perkovsky & Vasilenko	Middle Eocene	Sakhalinian amber	Russia	A member of the family Encyrtidae. The type species is S. leleji.	
Sakhalinoctonus	Gen. et sp. nov	Valid	Davidian in Davidian, Manukyan & Belokobylskij	Middle Eocene	Sakhalinian amber	Russia	A member of the family Braconidae belonging to the subfamily Aphidiinae. Genus includes new species S. alexrasnitsyni.	
Scleroxyela	Gen. et sp. nov	Valid	Zheng et al.	Middle Jurassic (Callovian-Bathonian boundary)	Jiulongshan Formation	China	A member of the family Xyelidae. The type species is S. daohugouensis.	
Spalangiopelta darlingi	Sp. nov	Valid	Moser in Moser et al.	Eocene	Baltic amber	Europe (Baltic Sea region)	A member of the family Pteromalidae.	
Spalangiopelta semialba	Sp. nov	Valid	Moser in Moser et al.	Eocene	Baltic amber	Europe (Baltic Sea region)	A member of the family Pteromalidae.	
Spheciellus	Fam. nov., Gen. et sp. nov.	Valid	Rosa & Melo	Late Cretaceous (Cenomanian)	Burmese amber	Myanmar	A member of Apoidea in the new family Spheciellidae. Genus includes new species S. aenigmaticus.	
Stephanorhyssalus	Gen. et sp. nov	Valid	Belokobylskij & Jouault	Late Cretaceous (Cenomanian)	Burmese amber	Myanmar	A member of the family Braconidae. Genus includes new species S. longiscapus.	
Tetragonula florilega	Sp. nov	Valid	Engel in Engel et al.	Miocene (Langhian)	Zhangpu amber	China	A stingless bee, a species of Tetragonula.	
Thigmocosmus	Gen. et sp. nov	Valid	Rosa & Melo	Late Cretaceous (Cenomanian)	Burmese amber	Myanmar	A member of the family Heterogynaidae. Genus includes new species T. longicornis.	
Tyrannomecia	Gen. et sp. nov	In press	Jouault & Nel	Paleocene	Menat Formation	France	An ant belonging to the stem group of the subfamily Myrmeciinae. Genus includes new species T. inopinata.	
Vespula? hassiaca	Sp. nov	In press	Abels & Wedmann	Eocene	Messel pit	Germany	A member of the family Vespidae.	
Xeris dorbnikensis	Sp. nov	Valid	Manukyan in Manukyan & Smirnova	Eocene	Baltic amber	Europe (Baltic Sea region)	A horntail. Originally described as a species of Xeris; Archibald & Rasnitsyn (2022) transferred it to the genus Urocerus.	
Zigrasimecia goldingot	Sp. nov	In press	Zhuang et al.	Cretaceous	Burmese amber	Myanmar	An ant in the tribe Sphecomyrmini.	

=== Hymenopteran Research ===
- Guo et al. (2021) report the discovery of two queen ant specimens from Burmese amber, belonging to the species Haidomyrmex cerberus and including the first known alate queen in Haidomyrmex.
- Cooccurrence of ants belonging to extant Holarctic genus Lasius and a tropical weaver ant in the same piece of amber is reported from the Bitterfeld amber (Germany) by Radchenko & Perkovsky (2021).
- Original claims that both Melittosphex burmensis and Discoscapa apicula were primitive bees have been rejected by Rosa & Melo, who instead consider the former to be an aculeate wasp of uncertain affinity, and the latter to belong within the crabronid wasp subfamily Crabroninae, a lineage not directly related to bees.

== Clade Neuropterida ==
=== Neuropterans ===
==== New Neuropteran taxa ====
Name	Novelty	Status	Authors	Age	Type locality	Country	Notes	Images
Ankyloleon	Gen. et sp. nov	Valid	Badano, Haug & Cerretti in Badano et al.	Late Cretaceous (Cenomanian)	Burmese amber	Myanmar	An early representative of the clade Myrmeleontiformia. The type species is A. caudatus.	
Astioberotha coutreti	Sp. nov	In press	Jouault	Late Cretaceous (Cenomanian)	Burmese amber	Myanmar	A member of the family Rhachiberothidae belonging to the subfamily Paraberothinae.	
Burmotachinymphes	Gen. et sp. nov	Valid	Cao, Wang & Liu	Cretaceous	Burmese amber	Myanmar	A member of the family Mesochrysopidae. Genus includes new species M. bilobata.	
Calobabinskaia	Gen. et sp. nov	Valid	Lu, Wang & Liu	Late Cretaceous (Cenomanian)	Burmese amber	Myanmar	A member of the family Babinskaiidae. The type species is C. xiai.	
Fuscopolystoechotes	Gen. et sp. nov	Valid	Xu, Zheng, Shih & Wang in Xu et al.	Middle Jurassic	Jiulongshan Formation	China	A member of the family Ithonidae. Genus includes new species F. reticulatus.	
Karenina cuneiformis	Sp. nov	Valid	Nakamine	Early Cretaceous (Aptian)	Crato Formation	Brazil	A member of the family Mesochrysopidae.	
Lichenipolystoechotes fenestratus	Sp. nov	Valid	Xu, Fang, Shih & Wang in Xu et al.	Middle Jurassic	Jiulongshan Formation	China	A member of the family Ithonidae.	
Osmylidia donnae	Sp. nov	Valid	Makarkin, Archibald, & Mathewes	Ypresian	Quilchena site	Canada; British Columbia	A protosmyline Osmylid lance lacewing	
Osmylidia glastrai	Sp. nov	Valid	Makarkin, Archibald, & Mathewes	Ypresian	Klondike Mountain Formation	United States; Washington	A protosmyline Osmylid lance lacewing	
Osmylidia picta	Comb. nov	Valid	(Hagen)	Priabonian	Baltic amber	Europe	A protosmyline Osmylid lance lacewing Moved from "Protosmylus" picta (1913)	
Osmylidia taliae	Sp. nov	Valid	Makarkin, Archibald, & Mathewes	Ypresian	Green River Formation; Parachute Creek Member	United States; Colorado	A protosmyline Osmylid lance lacewing	
Osmyloberotha	Gen. et sp. nov	Valid	Khramov	Late Cretaceous (Cenomanian)	Burmese amber	Myanmar	A beaded lacewing. Genus includes new species O. simpla.	
Paradoxoberotha	Gen. et sp. nov	In press	Nakamine et al.	Late Cretaceous (Cenomanian)	Burmese amber	Myanmar	A member of the family Rhachiberothidae. Genus includes new species P. chimaera.	
Paraneliana	Gen. et sp. nov	Valid	Jouault & Nel	Early Cretaceous	Crato Formation	Brazil	A member of the family Babinskaiidae. Genus includes new species P. sennlaubi.	
Rasnitsyneura	Gen. et comb. nov	Valid	Makarkin, Ansorge & Khramov	Early Jurassic (Toarcian)		Germany	A member of the family Ithonidae sensu lato belonging to the subfamily Epigambriinae. The type species is "Prohemerobius" aequabilis Bode (1953).	
Sinonothochrysa	Gen. et sp. nov	In press	Huang & Nel in Huang et al.	Paleocene	Buxin Formation	China	A member of the family Chrysopidae. Genus includes new species S. zhangi	
Stenobabinskaia	Gen. et sp. nov	Valid	Lu, Wang & Liu	Late Cretaceous (Cenomanian)	Burmese amber	Myanmar	A member of the family Babinskaiidae. The type species is S. punctata.	
Xiaobabinskaia	Gen. et sp. nov	Valid	Lu, Wang & Liu	Late Cretaceous (Cenomanian)	Burmese amber	Myanmar	A member of the family Babinskaiidae. The type species is X. lepidotricha.	

==== Neuropteran research ====
- Review of the known record of spoon-winged lacewing larvae is published Haug, Haug & Haug (2021), who report two specimens from the Cretaceous amber from Myanmar which might represent the first known larvae of members of the subfamily Nemopterinae in the fossil record.
- New lacewing larvae with elongated mouthparts are described from the Cretaceous amber from Myanmar by Haug et al. (2021), who also review the morphological diversity of fossil lacewing larvae.

=== Raphidiopterans ===
Name	Novelty	Status	Authors	Age	Type locality	Country	Notes	Images
Archiinocellia protomaculata	comb nov	valid	(Engel)	Lutetian	Green River Formation	USA; Colorado	A raphidiid snakefly. Moved from Agulla protomaculata (2011)	Archiinocellia protomaculata
Electrobaissoptera liui	Sp. nov	In press	Jouault, Engel & Nel	Late Cretaceous (Cenomanian)	Burmese amber	Myanmar	A baissopterid snakefly.	
Megaraphidia antiquissima	Sp. nov	Valid	Archibald & Makarkin	Ypresian	Tranquille Formation	Canada; British Columbia	A raphidiid snakefly.	
Megaraphidia hopkinsi	Sp. nov	Valid	Archibald & Makarkin	Ypresian	Allenby Formation	Canada; British Columbia	A raphidiid snakefly.	
Megaraphidia klondika	Sp. nov	Valid	Archibald & Makarkin	Ypresian	Klondike Mountain Formation	United States; Washington	A raphidiid snakefly.	
Megaraphidia ootsa	Sp. nov	Valid	Archibald & Makarkin	Ypresian	"Unnamed unit" Ootsa Group	Canada; British Columbia	A raphidiid snakefly.	
Mesoraphidia baekthoensis	Sp. nov	In press	Ri et al.	Early Cretaceous (Barremian–Aptian)	Sinuiju Formation	North Korea	A member of the family Mesoraphidiidae.	
Mesoraphidia ryonsangensis	Sp. nov	In press	Ri et al.	Early Cretaceous (Barremian–Aptian)	Sinuiju Formation	North Korea	A member of the family Mesoraphidiidae.	

== Clade †Palaeodictyopteroidea ==
=== †Megasecoptera ===
Name	Novelty	Status	Authors	Age	Type locality	Country	Notes	Images
Anhuihymen	Gen. et sp. nov	In press	Huang & Nel in Huang et al.	Middle Permian	Yinping Formation	China	A protohymenid Megasecoptera. The type species is A. medianelongata.	

=== †Palaeodictyoptera ===
==== New Palaeodictyopteran taxa ====
Name	Novelty	Status	Authors	Age	Type locality	Country	Notes	Images
Dictyoneura goujonorum	Sp. nov	In press	Logghe et al.	Carboniferous-Permian (Gzhelian-Asselian)		France	A member of Palaeodictyoptera.	
Sandiella herbigi	Sp. nov	In press	Brauckmann, Herd & Leipner	Carboniferous (Moscovian)		Germany	A member of Palaeodictyoptera belonging to the family Eugereonidae.	

==== Palaeodictyopteran research ====
- A study on the anatomy of fossil specimens described as consecutive series of different larval stages of palaeodictyopteran species Tchirkovaea guttata and Paimbia fenestrata, evaluating their implications for the knowledge of wing development in palaeodictyopterans, is published by Rosová, Sinitshenkova & Prokop (2021).

== Clade Palaeoptera ==
=== Ephemeroptera ===
==== New Ephemeropteran taxa ====
Name	Novelty	Status	Authors	Age	Type locality	Country	Notes	Images
Astraeoptera	Gen. et sp. nov	Valid	Brandão et al.	Early Cretaceous	Crato Formation	Brazil	A mayfly of uncertain phylogenetic placement. Genus includes new species A. cretacica.	
Burmella	Gen. et 2 sp. nov	Valid	Godunko, Martynov & Staniczek	Late Cretaceous (Cenomanian)	Burmese amber	Myanmar	A vietnamellid mayfly. The type species is B. paucivenosa; genus also includes B. clypeata.	
Protoligoneuria heloisae	Sp. nov	In press	Storari et al.	Early Cretaceous (Aptian)	Crato Formation	Brazil	A hexagenitid mayfly.	
Triassodotes rasnitsyni	Sp. nov	Valid	Sinitshenkova	Triassic		Russia	A misthodotid mayfly.	

==== Ephemeropteran research ====
- Sroka et al. (2021) provide new information on the morphology of Permian stem-mayflies Misthodotes sharovi and M. zalesskyi from the Tshekarda locality (Kungurian Koshelevka Formation; Perm Krai, Russia), and infer the life history traits of both the adult and larval stages of these insects.
- Possible underwater mayfly burrows are described from the Turonian Ferron Sandstone (Utah, United States) by King et al. (2021), who interpret this finding as evidence that burrowing mayflies adapted to domicile filter-feeding during or prior to the Turonian, and name a new ichnospecies Glossifungites gingrasi.

=== Odonatoptera ===
==== Odonata ====
===== New Odonatan taxa =====
Name	Novelty	Status	Authors	Age	Type locality	Country	Notes	Images
Chalcolestes tibetensis	Sp. nov	In press	Xia et al.	Late Eocene	Nima Basin	China	A species of Chalcolestes.	
Cretaphylolestes	Gen. et sp. nov	In press	Huang et al.	Early Cretaceous (Aptian)	Shouchang Formation	China	A damselfly belonging to the family Synlestidae. Genus includes new species C. cretacicus.	
Dakotaeschnidium	Gen. et sp. nov	Valid	Nel	Late Cretaceous (Maastrichtian)	Fox Hills Formation	United States (South Dakota)	A dragonfly belonging to the family Aeschnidiidae. Genus includes new species D. spedeni.	
Dysagrion pruettae	Sp. nov	Valid	Archibald & Cannings in Archibald et al.	Eocene (Ypresian)	Klondike Mountain Formation	United States (Washington)	A member of the family Dysagrionidae.	Dysagrion pruettae
Dysagrionites	Gen. et sp. nov	Valid	Archibald & Cannings in Archibald et al.	Eocene (Ypresian)	Klondike Mountain Formation	United States (Washington)	A collective group name for any fossil species referable to the Dysagrioninae whose orthotaxon generic affinity is unclear. Includes new species D. delinei.	
Epilestes rasnitsyni	Sp. nov	Valid	Felker & Vasilenko	Permian		Russia	A damselfly belonging to the family Permagrionidae.	
Jingguaeshna	Gen. et sp. nov	Valid	Zheng et al.	Miocene		China	A dragonfly belonging to the group Aeshnoidea, possibly a member of the family Telephlebiidae. Genus includes new species J. taoae.	
Marado	Gen. et sp. nov	Valid	Petrulevičius	Paleocene	Maíz Gordo Formation	Argentina	A damselfly belonging to the family Coenagrionidae. The type species is M. marado.	
Moltenophlebia	Gen. et sp. nov	Valid	Deregnaucourt et al.	Triassic	Molteno Formation	South Africa	A member of the stem group of Odonata, belonging to the group Zygophlebiida within the Triadophlebiomorpha. Genus includes new species M. lindae.	
Okanagrion	Gen. et 8 sp. nov	Valid	Archibald & Cannings in Archibald et al.	Eocene (Ypresian)	Klondike Mountain Formation	United States (Washington)	A member of the family Dysagrionidae. The type species is O. threadgillae; genus also includes new species O. hobani, O. beardi, O. lochmum, O. angustum, O. dorrellae, O. liquetoalatum and O. worleyae.	Okanagrion threadgillae
Okanopteryx	Gen. et 3 sp. nov	Valid	Archibald & Cannings in Archibald et al.	Eocene (Ypresian)	Tranquille Formation	Canada (British Columbia)	A member of the family Dysagrionidae. The type species is O. macabeensis; genus also includes new species O. fraseri and O. jeppesenorum.	
Phyonganpodagrion	Gen. et sp. nov	In press	So & Won	Early Cretaceous (Barremian–Aptian)	Sinuiju Formation	North Korea	A damselfly in the family Megapodagrionidae. Genus includes new species P. ryonsangae.	
Protohemiphlebia	Fam. et gen. et 2 sp. nov	In press	Zheng, Jarzembowski & Nel in Zheng et al.	Cretaceous	Burmese amber	Myanmar	A stem hemiphlebioid damselfly belonging to the new family Protohemiphlebiidae. Genus includes new species P. zhangi and P. meiyingae.	
Pulchrairina	Gen. et sp. nov	In press	Martynov, Vasilenko & Perkovsky	Late Eocene	Rovno amber	Ukraine	A damselfly belonging to the group Coenagrionoidea. Genus includes new species P. electra.	
Republica	Gen. et sp. nov	Valid	Archibald & Cannings	Eocene (Ypresian)	Klondike Mountain Formation	United States (Washington)	A euphaeid damselfly. Type species is R. weatbrooki. Not to be confused with the plant genus Republica also from the formation.	Republica weatbrooki
Stenodiafanus	Gen. et sp. nov	Valid	Archibald & Cannings in Archibald et al.	Eocene (Ypresian)	Klondike Mountain Formation	United States (Washington)	A dysagrionid odonate. Type species is S. westersidei.	Stenodiafanus westersidei
Stenophlebia ryonsangensis	Sp. nov	In press	Won, So & Kim	Early Cretaceous	Sinuiju Formation	North Korea	A stenophlebiid odonate.	
Whetwhetaksa	Fam. Nov., Gen. et sp. nov	Valid	Archibald & Cannings in Archibald et al.	Eocene (Ypresian)	Klondike Mountain Formation	United States	The type genus of Whetwhetaksidae, a new family of uncertain placement. The type species is W. millerae.	Whetwhetaksa millerae

===== Odonate research =====
- Archibald et al. (2021) establish a new, extinct suborder of Odonata named Cephalozygoptera, close to but distinct from damselflies, composed of the families Dysagrionidae, Sieblosiidae and possibly Whetwhetaksidae; their study is subsequently criticized by Nel & Zheng (2021), who consider evidence presented by Archibald et al. to be insufficient to support a new clade, and reject the suborder Cephalozygoptera as unfounded.

==== †Protozygoptera ====
Name	Novelty	Status	Authors	Age	Type locality	Country	Notes	Images
Kennedya kedrovkensis	Sp. nov	Valid	Felker	Early Triassic		Russia	A member of Protozygoptera belonging to the family Kennedyidae.	
Kennedya suchonensis	Sp. nov	Valid	Felker	Late Permian		Russia		
Progoneura kemerovensis	Sp. nov	Valid	Felker	Early Triassic		Russia	A member of Protozygoptera belonging to the family Kennedyidae.	

==== Other odonatopterans ====
Name	Novelty	Status	Authors	Age	Type locality	Country	Notes	Images
Brunellopteron	Gen. et sp. nov	Valid	Béthoux, Deregnaucourt & Norrad in Béthoux et al.	Carboniferous (Moscovian)	Sunbury Creek Formation	Canada (New Brunswick)	A member of Neodonatoptera of uncertain phylogenetic placement. The type species is B. norradi.	
Osnabruggiala	Gen. et sp. nov	Valid	Zessin, Brauckmann & Gröning	Carboniferous (Pennsylvanian)	Osnabrück Formation	Germany	Probably a basal member of Odonatoptera. The type species is O. seppelti.	

== Clade †Paoliidea ==
=== †Paoliida ===
Name	Novelty	Status	Authors	Age	Type locality	Country	Notes	Images
Avionblattinopsis	Gen. et sp. nov	Valid	Quispe et al.	Carboniferous (Moscovian)		France	A blattinopsid Paoliidan. The type species is A. oudardi. Béthoux (2026) reinterpreted A. oudardi as a junior synonym of Gulou oudardi Schubnel et al. (2019), and transferred this species to the genus Avionblattinopsis.	
Blattinopsis indefinitus	Sp. nov	Valid	Rasnitsyn & Aristov	Permian (Kungurian)		Russia (Krasnoyarsk Krai)	A Blattinopsidae Paoliidan	
Glaphyrophlebia borea	Sp. nov	Valid	Aristov, Rasnitsyn & Naugolnykh	Permian	Inta Formation	Russia (Komi Republic)	A Blattinopsid.	
Glaphyrophlebia iva	Sp. nov	Valid	Aristov & Rasnitsyn	Middle Permian		Russia	A member of the family Blattinopsidae.	
Glaphyrophlebia komia	Sp. nov	Valid	Aristov, Rasnitsyn & Naugolnykh	Permian	Inta Formation	Russia (Komi Republic)	A member of the family Blattinopsidae.	
Glaphyrophlebia vorkutensis	Sp. nov	Valid	Aristov, Rasnitsyn & Naugolnykh	Permian	Inta Formation	Russia (Komi Republic)	A member of the family Blattinopsidae.	

== Clade Paraneoptera ==
=== Hemipterans ===
==== New Hemipteran taxa ====
Name	Novelty	Status	Authors	Age	Type locality	Country	Notes	Images
Acrotiara	Trib. et gen. et sp. nov	In press	Bourgoin & Luo in Luo et al.	Late Cretaceous (Cenomanian)	Burmese amber	Myanmar	A member of the family Cixiidae; the type genus of the new tribe Acrotiarini. The type species is A. multigranulata Luo & Bourgoin.	
Aneurus damzeni	Sp. nov	Valid	Heiss in Heiss, Kairišs & Bukejs	Eocene	Baltic amber	Russia (Kaliningrad Oblast)	A species of Aneurus.	
Aphelicophontes	Gen. et sp. nov	Valid	Swanson et al.	Eocene	Green River Formation	United States	A member of the family Reduviidae belonging to the subfamily Harpactorinae. Genus includes new species A. danjuddi.	
Baltiomiris	Gen. et sp. nov	Valid	Kim, Chérot & Jung	Eocene	Baltic amber	Europe (Baltic Sea region)	A member of the family Miridae. The type species is B. herczeki.	
Barremixius	Gen. et comb. nov	In press	Bourgoin & Szwedo in Luo et al.	Early Cretaceous	Weald Clay	United Kingdom	A member of the family Cixiidae; a new genus for "Cixius" petrinus Fennah.	
Beaconiella cincta	Sp. nov	Valid	Shcherbakov	Triassic (Ladinian–Carnian)	Madygen Formation	Kyrgyzstan	A member of Cicadomorpha belonging to the superfamily Pereborioidea and the family Curvicubitidae.	
Beaconiella pulchra	Sp. nov	Valid	Shcherbakov	Triassic (Ladinian–Carnian)	Madygen Formation	Kyrgyzstan	A member of Cicadomorpha belonging to the superfamily Pereborioidea and the family Curvicubitidae.	
Burmacader bicoloripennis	Sp. nov	Valid	Souma, Yamamoto & Takahashi	Late Cretaceous (Cenomanian)	Burmese amber	Myanmar	A member of the family Tingidae.	
Burmacader grandis	Sp. nov	Valid	Heiss & Guilbert	Cretaceous	Burmese amber	Myanmar	A member of the family Tingidae.	
Burmala	Gen. et sp. nov	Valid	Liu et al.	Cretaceous	Burmese amber	Myanmar	A member of the family Malmopsyllidae. Genus includes new species B. liaoyaoi.	
Burmaprosbole	Gen. et sp. nov	Valid	Qiao et al.	Cretaceous	Burmese amber	Myanmar	A member of the family Tettigarctidae. Genus includes new species B. nervosa.	
Burmavianaida	Gen. et sp. nov	Valid	Souma, Yamamoto & Takahashi	Cretaceous (Albian or Cenomanian)	Burmese amber	Myanmar	A member of the family Tingidae. The type species is B. anomalocapitata.	
Cretamystilus	Gen. et sp. nov	Valid	Kim, Lim & Jung	Late Cretaceous (Cenomanian)	Burmese amber	Myanmar	A member of the family Miridae belonging to the tribe Mecistoscelini. Genus includes new species C. herczeki.	
Cretodorus rostellatus	Sp. nov	In press	Zhang et al.	Late Cretaceous (Cenomanian)	Burmese amber	Myanmar	A member of the family Mimarachnidae.	
Cretomultinervis	Gen. et sp. nov	Valid	Fu & Huang	Cretaceous	Burmese amber	Myanmar	A member of the family Sinoalidae. Genus includes new species C. burmensis.	
Dachibangus hui	Sp. nov	Valid	Zhang, Yao & Pang in Zhang et al.	Late Cretaceous (Cenomanian)	Burmese amber	Myanmar	A member of the family Mimarachnidae. Originally described as a species of Dachibangus, but subsequently transferred to the genus Xiaochibangus.	
Delphitiara	Gen. et sp. nov	In press	Bourgoin & Luo in Luo et al.	Late Cretaceous (Cenomanian)	Burmese amber	Myanmar	A member of the family Cixiidae belonging to the tribe Acrotiarini. The type species is D. tibiocoronata Luo & Bourgoin.	
Dorytocus jiaxiaoae	Sp. nov	Valid	Song, Szwedo & Bourgoin in Song et al.	Late Cretaceous (Cenomanian)	Burmese amber	Myanmar	A planthopper.	
Duyana	Gen. et sp. nov	Valid	Chen et al.	Late Cretaceous (Cenomanian)	Burmese amber	Myanmar	A leafhopper belonging to the subfamily Ledrinae. Genus includes new species D. electronica.	
Electromyiomma herczeki	Sp. nov	Valid	Kim & Jung	Eocene	Baltic amber	Europe (Baltic Sea region)	A member of the family Miridae.	
Eospinosus	Gen. et 2 sp. nov	Valid	Wedmann et al.	Eocene	Messel pit	Germany; United States (Colorado)	A member of the family Pentatomidae. The type species is E. peterkulkai; genus also includes E. greenriverensis.	
Ferriantenna	Gen. et sp. nov	Valid	Cumming & Le Tirant	Late Cretaceous (Cenomanian)	Burmese amber	Myanmar	A member of the family Coreidae belonging to the subfamily Coreinae. The type species is F. excalibur.	
Hallex martinsnetoi	Sp. nov	In press	Monferran et al.	Early Cretaceous	Crato Formation	Brazil	A leafhopper.	
Hypsotsijilia	Gen. et sp. nov	Valid	Cifuentes-Ruiz & Brailovsky in Cifuentes-Ruiz et al.	Early Miocene	La Quinta Formation (Mexican amber)	Mexico	A member of the family Schizopteridae. The type species is H. bretoni.	
Inoderbe	Fam. et gen. et sp. nov	Valid	Shcherbakov & Emeljanov	Cretaceous (Albian–Cenomanian)	Burmese amber	Myanmar	A planthopper belonging to the new family Inoderbidae. The type species is I. rapunzel.	
Juroala pulchra	Sp. nov	Valid	Fu & Huang	Late Jurassic	Daohugou Beds	China	A member of the family Sinoalidae.	
Karatauella	Nom. nov	Valid	Doweld	Jurassic (Bathonian-Oxfordian)		Kazakhstan	A member of the family Protopsyllidiidae; a replacement name for Carpenterella Becker-Migdisova (1968).	
Latidorsum	Gen. et sp. nov		Wang, Tang & Yao in Wang et al.	Late Cretaceous (Cenomanian)	Burmese amber	Myanmar	A member of the family Tingidae. The type species is L. carinbifarium.	
Microtingis	Gen. et sp. nov	Junior synonym	Heiss & Golub	Cretaceous	Burmese amber	Myanmar	A member of the family Tingidae. Genus includes new species M. leptosoma. Subsequently Heiss & Golub (2021) considered this species to be a junior synonym of Burmavianaida anomalocapitata.	
Multistria	Gen. et sp. nov	Valid	Zhang, Yao & Pang in Zhang et al.	Late Cretaceous (Cenomanian)	Burmese amber	Myanmar	A member of the family Mimarachnidae. The type species is M. orthotropa.	
Paleocader balticus	Sp. nov	Valid	Heiss & Golub	Eocene	Baltic amber	Europe (Baltic Sea region)	A member of the family Tingidae.	
Paleocader pulchellus	Sp. nov	Valid	Heiss & Golub	Eocene	Baltic amber	Europe (Baltic Sea region)	A member of the family Tingidae.	
Paleocader rovnensis	Sp. nov	Valid	Heiss & Golub	Eocene	Rovno amber	Ukraine	A member of the family Tingidae.	
Parasinalda sukachevae	Sp. nov	Valid	Golub, Perkovsky & Vasilenko	Late Eocene	Rovno amber	Ukraine	A member of the family Tingidae.	
Pentacarinus	Gen. et sp. nov	In press	Bourgoin & Luo in Luo et al.	Late Cretaceous (Cenomanian)	Burmese amber	Myanmar	A member of the family Cixiidae belonging to the tribe Acrotiarini. The type species is P. kachinensis Luo & Bourgoin.	
Pseudocaulisoculus	Gen. et sp. nov	Valid	Kóbor & Roca-Cusachs	Cretaceous	Burmese amber	Myanmar	A member of the family Yuripopovinidae. Genus includes new species P. longicornis.	
Pubivetanthocoris	Gen. et sp. nov	In press	Tang, Wang & Yao in Tang et al.	Cretaceous	Burmese amber	Myanmar	A member of the family Vetanthocoridae. Genus includes new species P. carinalis.	
"Pyrrhocoris" rottensis	Nom. nov	Valid	Kment	Late Oligocene		Germany	A member of Lygaeoidea of uncertain phylogenetic placement; a replacement name for Pyrrhocoris tibialis Statz & Wagner (1950).	
Rovnoxestus	Gen. et sp. nov	Valid	Dietrich, Dmitriev & Perkovsky	Late Eocene	Rovno amber	Ukraine	A leafhopper. Genus includes new species R. rasnitsyni.	
Saltissus fennahi	Sp. nov	In press	Luo, Liu & Jarzembowski in Luo et al.	Early Cretaceous	Weald Clay	United Kingdom	A member of the family Mimarachnidae.	
Scytinoptera tongchuanensis	Sp. nov	In press	Zhang, Zheng & Zhang in Zhang et al.	Middle Triassic	Tongchuan Formation	China	A member of the family Scytinopteridae.	
Sinogranulus	Gen. et sp. nov	In press	Zhang, Chen & Zhang	Middle Triassic	Tongchuan Formation	China	A member of Scytinopteroidea belonging to the family Granulidae. Genus includes new species S. qishuiheensis.	
Spinonympha	Gen. et sp. nov	Valid	Luo, Wang & Jarzembowski	Late Cretaceous (Cenomanian)	Burmese amber	Myanmar	A planthopper of uncertain phylogenetic placement. The type species is S. shcherbakovi.	
Szeiinia	Fam. nov., Gen. et sp. nov	Valid	Zhang et al.	Late Triassic	Yanchang Formation	China	A planthopper in the new family Szeiiniidae. Genus includes new species S. huanglongensis	
Tennentsia orientalis	Sp. nov	In press	Fu, Azar & Huang	Middle Triassic	Yanchang Formation	China	A member of Cicadomorpha belonging to the family Dysmorphoptilidae.	
Triknightia	Gen. et sp. nov	Valid	Shcherbakov	Triassic (Ladinian–Carnian)	Madygen Formation	Kyrgyzstan	A member of Cicadomorpha belonging to the superfamily Scytinopteroidea and the family Paraknightiidae. The type species is T. mira.	
Tuthillia maculosa	Sp. nov	Valid	Poinar & Brown		Dominican amber	Dominican Republic	A member of Psylloidea.	
Valdicopis	Gen. et sp. nov	Valid	Li, Chen & Jarzembowski	Early Cretaceous		United Kingdom	A member of the family Procercopidae. Genus includes new species V. tonyi.	
Youngeewa simillima	Sp. nov	Valid	Gębicki & Walczak in Gębicki, Walczak & Zmarzły	Eocene	Baltic amber	Europe (Baltic Sea region)	A leafhopper belonging to the subfamily Mileewinae.	

==== Hemipteran research ====
- Grimaldi & Vea (2021) reinterpret Mesophthirus engeli as a scale insect, and reject the interpretation of this insect as an ectoparasite.
- Redescription of the holotype specimen of Paranoika placida is published by Moura-Júnior et al. (2021), who transfer this species to the genus Lethocerus, and consider this species to be the senior synonym of Lethocerus vetus.
- A fulgorid specimen, representing the oldest occurrence of this family in the fossil record in Asia, is described from the Eocene Lunpola Basin (Qinghai-Tibetan Plateau, China) by Xu et al. (2021).
- Revision of the fossil record of Fulgoromorpha and Cicadomorpha from the Jurassic and Cretaceous of eastern Asia is published by Chen (2021).

=== Psocodeans ===
==== New Psocodean taxa ====
Name	Novelty	Status	Authors	Age	Type locality	Country	Notes	Images
Burmesopsocus	Gen. et sp. nov	Valid	Yoshizawa in Yoshizawa & Yamamoto	Cretaceous (Albian–Cenomanian)	Burmese amber	Myanmar	A member of Homilopsocidea of uncertain phylogenetic placement. The type species is B. lienhardi.	
Cormopsocus baleoi	Sp. nov	Valid	Hakim, Azar & Huang	Cretaceous	Burmese amber	Myanmar	A member of Trogiomorpha belonging to the family Cormopsocidae.	
Cormopsocus neli	Sp. nov	Valid	Hakim, Azar & Huang in Hakim et al.	Cretaceous	Burmese amber	Myanmar	A member of Trogiomorpha belonging to the family Cormopsocidae.	
Empherium	Gen. et sp. nov	Valid	Hakim, Huang & Azar	Late Cretaceous		Russia	A member of Trogiomorpha belonging to the family Empheriidae. Genus includes new species E. rasnitsyni.	
Eolepinotus zherikhini	Sp. nov	Valid	Hakim, Huang & Azar	Late Cretaceous		Russia	A member of Trogiomorpha belonging to the family Trogiidae.	
Heliadesdakruon	Gen. et sp. nov	Valid	Cumming & Le Tirant	Late Cretaceous (Cenomanian)	Burmese amber	Myanmar	A member of Trogiomorpha belonging to the family Archaeatropidae. The type species is H. morganae.	
Longiglabellus	Gen. et 2 sp. nov	In press	Wang, Li & Yao in Wang et al.	Cretaceous	Burmese amber	Myanmar	A member of the family Cormopsocidae. Genus includes new species L. edentatus and L. pedhyalinus.	
Palaeosiamoglaris hammanaensis	Sp. nov	In press	Hakim, Huang & Azar	Early Cretaceous (Barremian)	Lebanese amber	Lebanon	A member of Psocodea belonging to the family Prionoglarididae.	
Palaeosiamoglaris hkamtiensis	Sp. nov	In press	Jouault et al.	Early Cretaceous	Hkamti amber	Myanmar	A member of Psocodea belonging to the family Prionoglarididae.	
Psyllipsocus myanmarensis	Sp. nov	In press	Jouault et al.	Late Cretaceous (Cenomanian)	Burmese amber	Myanmar	A member of Psocodea belonging to the family Psyllipsocidae, a species of Psyllipsocus.	
Psyllipsocus yangi	Sp. nov	Valid	Liang & Liu	Cretaceous	Burmese amber	Myanmar	A member of Psocodea belonging to the family Psyllipsocidae, a species of Psyllipsocus.	
Stimulopsocus	Gen. et sp. nov	In press	Liang & Liu	Cretaceous	Burmese amber	Myanmar	A member of the family Cormopsocidae. Genus includes new species S. jiewenae.	

==== Psocodean research ====
- Four bark lice carrying sand granules and organic material atop their back are described from the Cretaceous amber from Myanmar by Kiesmüller et al. (2021), who interpret this finding as the first fossil evidence of masking behaviour in Cretaceous representatives of Psocodea.

== Clade Perlidea ==
=== Dermapterans ===
==== New Dermapteran ====
Name	Novelty	Status	Authors	Age	Type locality	Country	Notes	Images
Aglyptoderma	Gen. et 2 sp. nov	Valid	Xiong et al.	Middle Jurassic	Jiulongshan Formation	China	A semenoviolid eodermapteran earwig. Genus includes the new species A. elongatum and A. cylindratum.	
Aneuroderma	Gen. et sp. nov	Valid	Xiong, Engel & Ren in Xiong et al.	Middle Jurassic	Jiulongshan Formation	China	A member of the family Protodiplatyidae. The type species is A. oiodes.	
Dacryoderma	Gen. et comb. nov	Valid	Engel	Early Jurassic (Sinemurian)	Charmouth Mudstone Formation	United Kingdom	A dermapterid earwig. The type species is "Brevicula" teres Tihelka (2019).	
Eminepygia	Gen. et sp. nov	Valid	Chen & Zhang	Cenomanian	Burmese amber	Myanmar	A pygidicranid earwig. Genus includes new species E. myanmarensis.	
Sinopalaeodermata concavum	Sp. nov	Valid	Xiong, Engel & Ren in Xiong et al.	Middle Jurassic	Jiulongshan Formation	China	A member of the family Dermapteridae.	

=== Plecoptera ===
==== New Plecopteran taxa ====
Name	Novelty	Status	Authors	Age	Type locality	Country	Notes	Images
Balticonemoura	Gen. et sp. nov	In press	Chen	Eocene	Baltic amber	Europe (Baltic Sea region)	A nemourid stonefly. Genus includes new species B. bulbosus.	
Billoperla	Gen. et sp. nov	In press	Chen & Xu	Cretaceous	Burmese amber	Myanmar	A perlid stonefly belonging to the family. Genus includes new species B. starki.	
Isoperla baltica	Sp. nov	Valid	Jouault et al.	Eocene	Baltic amber	Europe (Baltic Sea regon)	A perlodid stonefly.	

== Other insects ==
=== New taxa ===
Name	Novelty	Status	Authors	Age	Type locality	Country	Notes	Images
Anakitala	Gen. et sp. nov	Valid	Aristov	Late Permian		Russia	A mesorthopterid Eoblattidan Polyneopteran. The type species is A. intermittendia.	
Baharellinus elegans	Sp. nov	Valid	Aristov	Late Permian		Russia	A member of Polyneoptera belonging to the group Eoblattida and the family Blattogryllidae.	
Belmophenopterum rasnitsyni	Sp. nov	Valid	Storozhenko & Aristov	Triassic (Ladinian-Carnian)	Madygen Formation	Kyrgyzstan	A member of the family Mesorthopteridae.	
Cabarzopterum	Gen. et sp. nov	Valid	Cui et al.	Early Permian	Goldlauter Formation	Germany	A member of Grylloblattida of uncertain phylogenetic placement. Genus includes new species C. magnificus.	
Delopterinus alsenzensis	Sp. nov	Valid	Nel & Poschmann	Early Permian	Saar–Nahe Basin	Germany	A miomopteran belonging to the family Palaeomanteidae.	
Delopterum novokshonovi	Sp. nov	Valid	Nel & Poschmann	Early Permian	Saar–Nahe Basin	Germany	A miomopteran belonging to the family Palaeomanteidae.	
Elmocladus	Gen. et comb. nov	Valid	Rasnitsyn & Aristov	Early Permian		United States	A member of Polyneoptera belonging to the group Eoblattida and the family Tococladidae. The type species is "Opisthocladus" strictus Carpenter (1976).	
Galloembia	Gen. et sp. nov	Valid	Falières, Engel & Nel	Earliest Eocene	Oise amber	France	A webspinner belonging to the family Embiidae. The type species is G. raholai.	
Gnethoda odontophora	Sp. nov	In press	Lai et al.	Cretaceous	Burmese amber	Myanmar	A webspinner belonging to the family Clothodidae.	
Kamopanorpa rasnitsyni	Sp. nov	Valid	Bashkuev & Sukatsheva	Permian	Minusinsk Coal Basin	Russia	A member of the (stem-trichopteran or stem-amphiesmenopteran) family Microptysmatidae.	
Kamopanorpa rotunda	Sp. nov	Valid	Bashkuev & Sukatsheva	Permian	Minusinsk Coal Basin	Russia	A member of the family Microptysmatidae.	
Kamopanorpa sivchikovi	Sp. nov	Valid	Bashkuev & Sukatsheva	Permian	Minusinsk Coal Basin	Russia	A member of the family Microptysmatidae.	
Liomopterites sperbersbachensis	Sp. nov	Valid	Cui et al.	Early Permian	Goldlauter Formation	Germany	A member of Grylloblattida belonging to the family Liomopteridae.	
Liomopterum fuscatum	Sp. nov	Valid	Cui et al.	Early Permian	Goldlauter Formation	Germany	A member of Grylloblattida belonging to the family Liomopteridae.	
Madygembia	Gen. et sp. nov	Valid	Aristov & Storozhenko	Triassic (Ladinian or Carnian)	Madygen Formation	Kyrgyzstan	A webspinner belonging to the family Alexarasniidae. The type species is M. rasnitsyni.	
Magicivena	Fam. et gen. et 3 sp. nov	Valid	Yang et al.	Early Cretaceous	Yixian Formation	China	A member of Polyneoptera of uncertain phylogenetic placement, belonging to the new family Magicivenidae. The type species is M. sticta; genus also includes M. elegans and M. antennalis.	
Multivena	Gen. et sp. nov	In press	Lai et al.	Cretaceous	Burmese amber	Myanmar	A webspinner belonging to the family Sorellembiidae. Genus includes new species M. curvivena.	
Pictoborella	Gen. et sp. et comb. nov	Valid	Cui et al.	Early Permian		Germany	A member of Grylloblattida. Genus includes new species P. clara, as well as "Oborella" germanica Prokop et al. (2021).	
Rasnalexia	Fam. et gen. et sp. nov	Valid	Gorochov	Triassic		Kyrgyzstan	A member of Embioptera belonging to the new family Rasnalexiidae. Genus includes new species R. rasnitsyni.	
Uralioma thuringiensis	Sp. nov	Valid	Cui et al.	Early Permian	Goldlauter Formation	Germany	A member of Grylloblattida belonging to the family Liomopteridae.	

=== Other insect research ===
- A well-preserved full-body impression of an elongate winged insect strongly resembling stick insects is described from the Permian (Wordian) Pelitic Formation (France) by Logghe et al. (2021), who name a new ichnotaxon Phasmichnus radagasti.
- A dragonfly-type odonatopteran larva, preserving ancestral morphological characters maintained in mayflies but lost in modern odonatan larvae, is described from the Cretaceous Burmese amber by Haug, Müller & Haug (2021).

== General research ==
- Revision of the fossil record of insects from the Triassic of China is published by Zhang et al. (2021).
- A study on the diversity of insect damage types in fossil plants from the Cretaceous (Albian to Cenomanian) Dakota Formation (United States), evaluating their implications for the knowledge of the early evolution of angiosperm florivory and associated pollination, is published by Xiao et al. (2021).
