= Paleoplatyura johnsoni =

Scientific classification
- Domain: Eukaryota
- Kingdom: Animalia
- Phylum: Arthropoda
- Class: Insecta
- Order: Diptera
- Family: Keroplatidae
- Tribe: Orfeliini
- Genus: Paleoplatyura
- Species: P. johnsoni

Binomial name
- Paleoplatyura johnsoni Johannsen, 1910

Species of fly

Paleoplatyura johnsoni is a species of predatory fungus gnat in the family Keroplatidae.
