= Discoscapa =

Discoscapa Temporal range: Upper Cretaceous (Cenomanian?) 92 Ma

Scientific classification
- Kingdom: Animalia
- Phylum: Arthropoda
- Clade: Pancrustacea
- Class: Insecta
- Order: Hymenoptera
- Family: Crabronidae
- Subfamily: Crabroninae
- Tribe: †Discoscapini; Poinar, 2020
- Genus: †Discoscapa; Poinar, 2020
- Species: †D. apicula

Binomial name
- †Discoscapa apicula Poinar, 2020

Extinct species of wasp

Discoscapa is an extinct genus of crabronid wasp, formerly considered one of the two oldest-known species of bees. The genus contains only one species Discoscapa apicula. The genus was described from an amber inclusion in Burmese Amber in 2020 by George Poinar Jr., a zoologist at Oregon State University. The fossil was found in a mine in the Hukawng Valley of northern Myanmar and is believed to date from the Cretaceous Period, 100 million years ago, the same age as Melittosphex burmensis, likewise previously considered the oldest known bee species; as it comes from the same amber deposit, these two specimens are considered to be the same approximate age. More recent research has concluded that D. apicula is a wasp belonging to the subfamily Crabroninae, placed in its own tribe, Discoscapini.
