= Ujna =

Paramelia

Scientific classification
- Domain: Eukaryota
- Kingdom: Animalia
- Phylum: Arthropoda
- Class: Insecta
- Order: Hemiptera
- Suborder: Auchenorrhyncha
- Family: Cicadellidae
- Subfamily: Mileewinae
- Genus: Ujna; Distant, 1907

Genus of true bugs

Ujna is a genus of leafhoppers belonging to the family Cicadellidae, subfamily Mileewinae. They are known from India, Madagascar and Seychelles.

== Species ==
Some species of this genus are:

- Ujna acuta Krishnankutty & Dietrich, 2011
- Ujna affinis Krishnankutty & Dietrich, 2011
- Ujna alba Krishnankutty & Dietrich, 2011
- Ujna bimaculata Krishnankutty & Dietrich, 2011
- Ujna bicolorata Rao 1995
- Ujna consors Distant 1908
- Ujna delicatula Distant, 1908
- Ujna exigua Melichar 1903
- Ujna flavidipes Distant, 1917
- Ujna gagatina Melichar 1903
- Ujna maolanana Yang & Li 2000
- Ujna philippinensis Baker 1914
- Ujna rostrata Krishnankutty & Dietrich, 2011
- Ujna trishula Krishnankutty & Dietrich, 2011
- Ujna variabilis Krishnankutty & Dietrich, 2011
