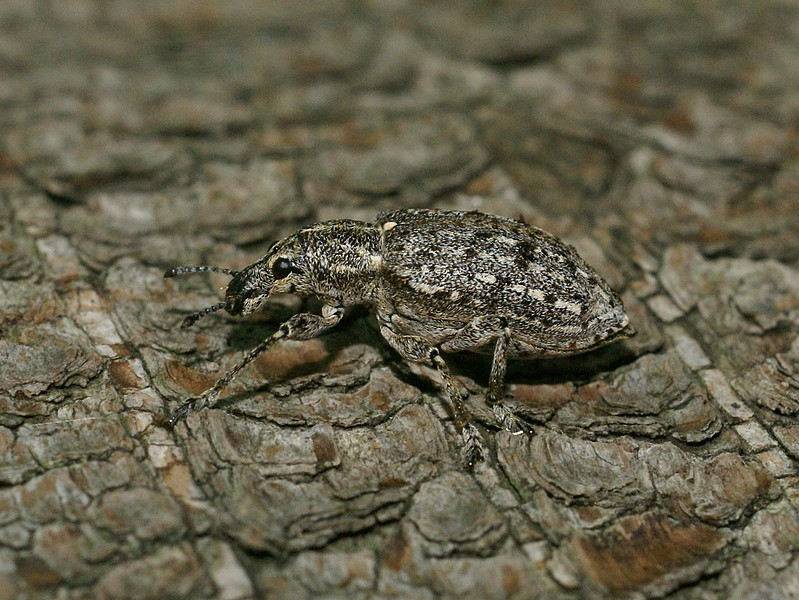

Scientific classification
- Domain: Eukaryota
- Kingdom: Animalia
- Phylum: Arthropoda
- Class: Insecta
- Order: Coleoptera
- Suborder: Polyphaga
- Infraorder: Cucujiformia
- Family: Brentidae
- Subfamily: Ithycerinae
- Genus: Ithycerus
- Species: I. noveboracensis

Binomial name
- Ithycerus noveboracensis Forster, 1771

= New York weevil =

Species of beetle

The New York weevil (Ithycerus noveboracensis) is a species of primitive weevil; large for weevils (12–18 mm), it is covered with fine bristles and has a regular pattern of light and dark spots. It occurs in the eastern United States and southern Canada.

The rostrum (snout) is broad and stout, while the antennae are straight and thin, with the final three antennomeres making a small club.

This weevil is found in association with various plants of Fagaceae, Betulaceae, and Juglandaceae, in particular white oak and American beech. Adults feed on new growth and other soft parts, such as leaf petioles and buds. They lay their eggs in the ground, and the grubs then eat the roots of the same plants.

Though it was originally placed in Curculionidae, coleopterists have long agreed that Ithycerus belongs in a different family, as it does not have geniculate (elbowed) antennae, a characteristic of true weevils. It has been traditionally considered as the only species in its own family, Ithyceridae, but more recent classifications place it as the sole member of the subfamily Ithycerinae in the family Brentidae.
