= Szeiinia =

Szeiinia Temporal range: Late Triassic

Scientific classification
- Kingdom: Animalia
- Phylum: Arthropoda
- Class: Insecta
- Order: Hemiptera
- Suborder: Auchenorrhyncha
- Infraorder: Fulgoromorpha
- Family: †Szeiiniidae; Zhang, Jiang, Szwedo & Zhang, 2021
- Genus: †Szeiinia; Zhang, Jiang, Szwedo & Zhang, 2021

Type species
- Szeiinia huanglongensis Zhang, Jiang, Szwedo & Zhang, 2021

Genus of Triassic planthoppers

Szeiinia is an extinct genus of planthoppers from the Late Triassic of China. It was named by Zhang, Jiang, Szwedo, and Zhang in 2021, and is the only genus of the family Szeiiniidae. It itself comprises the single species Szeiinia huanglongensis.

Discovered in the Upper Triassic Yanchang Formation, the genus is distinguished from its relatives in Fulgoroidea by the less elongated shape of its forewings, as well as different patterns of wing venation.
