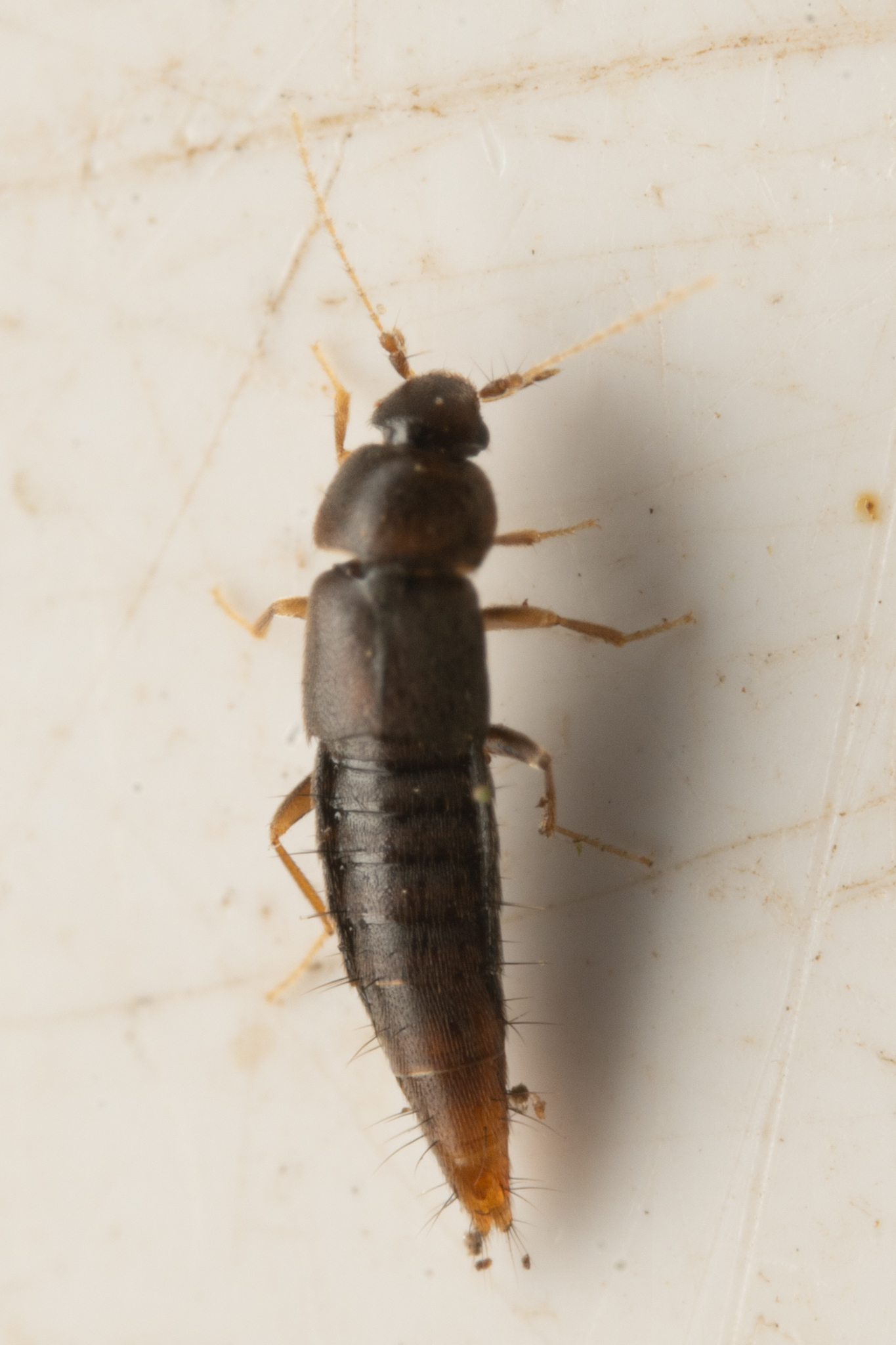
- Trichophya tarsalis

Scientific classification
- Kingdom: Animalia
- Phylum: Arthropoda
- Clade: Pancrustacea
- Class: Insecta
- Order: Coleoptera
- Suborder: Polyphaga
- Infraorder: Staphyliniformia
- Family: Staphylinidae
- Subfamily: Trichophyinae
- Genus: Trichophya; Mannerheim, 1830

= Trichophya =

Genus of beetles

Trichophya is a genus of beetles belonging to the family Staphylinidae. It is the only genus in the subfamily Trichophyinae.

The species of this genus are found in Europe and North America.

Species:

- Trichophya andrewesi Cameron, 1944
- Trichophya antennalis Cameron, 1932
