= Mileewinae =

Scientific classification
- Domain: Eukaryota
- Kingdom: Animalia
- Phylum: Arthropoda
- Class: Insecta
- Order: Hemiptera
- Suborder: Auchenorrhyncha
- Family: Cicadellidae
- Subfamily: Mileewinae; Evans, 1947

Tribes
- Makilingiini; Mileewini; Tinteromini; Tungurahualini

Subfamily of leafhoppers

Mileewinae is a small subfamily in the family Cicadellidae (leafhoppers). It is closely related to Typhlocybinae and contains species that were previously part of Cicadellinae.

== Description ==
Mileewinae leafhoppers are small, slender, and usually quite dark in colouration, with blue and yellow accents. They often rest with their wings unfolded, unlike most leafhoppers.

== Distribution ==
Members of the subfamily are found feeding on Dicotyledon herbs in the Afrotropical, Indomalayan, Neotropical, and Australian realms.

== Tribes and genera ==
There are four tribes in the subfamily.

=== Makilingini ===
Erected by Evans in 1947. A monotypic tribe found in the Indomalayan realm.

- Makilingia Baker, 1914

=== Mileewini ===
Erected by Evans in 1947. They are found throughout the entire range of the subfamily.

- Amahuaka Melichar, 1926
- Archeguina Young, 1993
- Eomileewa Gebicki & Szwedo, 2001
- Mileewa Distant, 1908
- Teniwitta Szwedo, 2019
- Ujna Distant, 1908
- Youngeewa Gebicki & Szwedo, 2001

=== Tinteromini ===
A monotypic tribe erected by Godoy & Webb in 1994.

- Tinteromus Godoy & Webb, 1994

=== Tungurahualini ===
Erected by Dietrich in 2011

- Ilyapa Dietrich, 2011
- Tungurahuala Kramer, 1965
