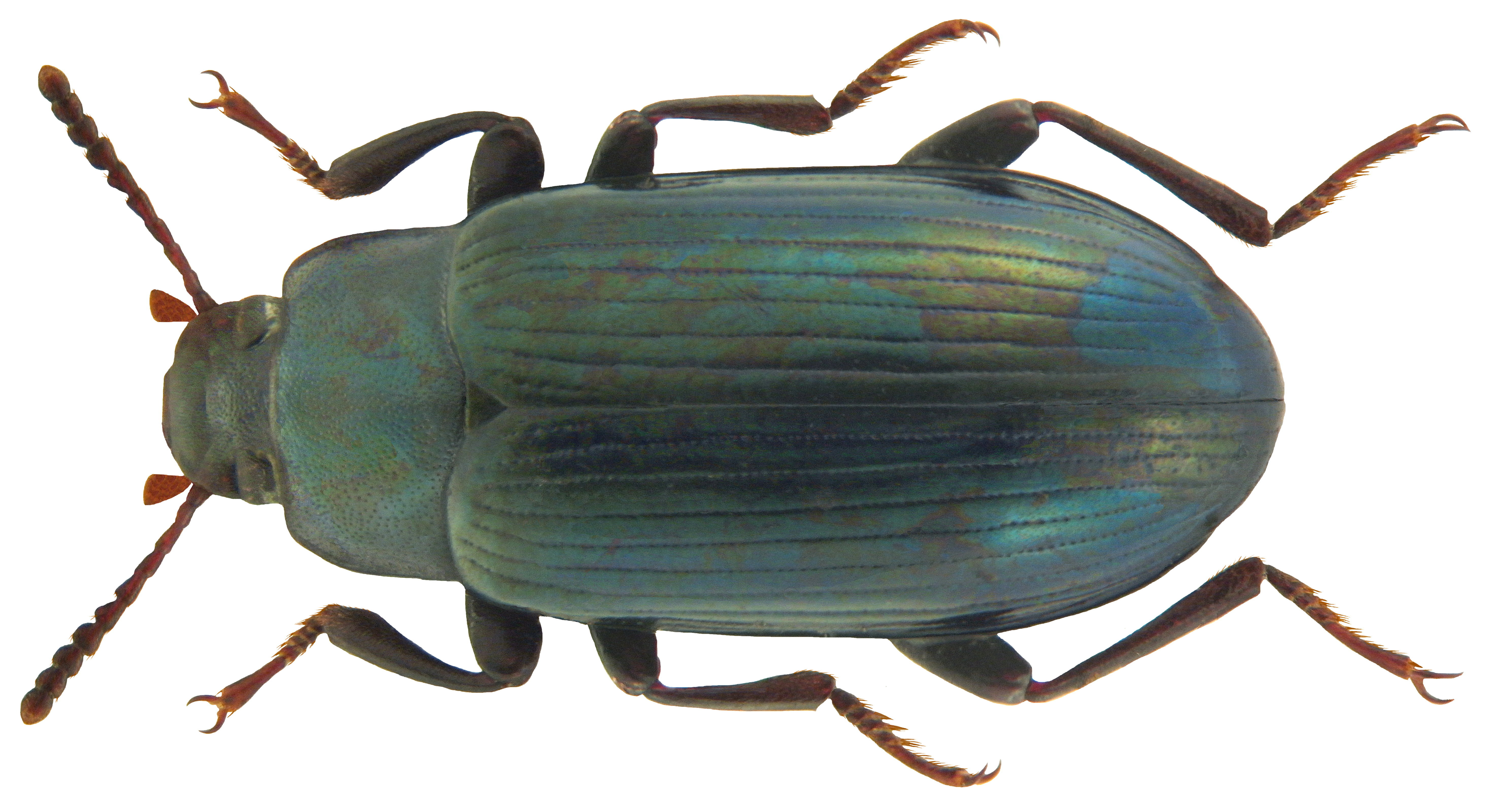
- Metaclisa viridis, Iran

Scientific classification
- Domain: Eukaryota
- Kingdom: Animalia
- Phylum: Arthropoda
- Class: Insecta
- Order: Coleoptera
- Suborder: Polyphaga
- Infraorder: Cucujiformia
- Family: Tenebrionidae
- Subfamily: Tenebrioninae
- Tribe: Metaclisini
- Genus: Metaclisa; Jacquelin du Val, 1861

= Metaclisa =

Genus of darkling beetles

Metaclisa is a genus of darkling beetles in the family Tenebrionidae, the sole genus of the tribe Metaclisini. There are at least four described species in Metaclisa, found in North America, the Neotropics, the Palearctic, and Indomalaya.

== Species ==
These species belong to the genus Metaclisa:

- Metaclisa atra LeConte, 1866
- Metaclisa azurea (Waltl, 1838)
- Metaclisa marginalis Horn, 1870
- Metaclisa seditiosa (LeConte 1866)
