= Paleoplatyura =

Paleoplatyura Temporal range: Cenomanian–Recent

Scientific classification
- Domain: Eukaryota
- Kingdom: Animalia
- Phylum: Arthropoda
- Class: Insecta
- Order: Diptera
- Family: Keroplatidae
- Subfamily: Keroplatinae
- Tribe: Orfeliini
- Genus: Paleoplatyura; Meunier, 1899

Genus of flies

Paleoplatyura is a genus of predatory fungus gnats in the family Keroplatidae. There are about seven described species in Paleoplatyura. Fossil species are known from the mid-Cretaceous Burmese amber of Myanmar, dating to around 100 million years ago.

== Species ==
These seven species belong to the genus Paleoplatyura:

- P. aldrichii Johannsen, 1909
- P. johnsoni Johannsen, 1910
- P. melanderi Fisher, 1941
- † M. macrocera (Meunier, 1899)
- † P. eocenica Cockerell, 1921
- † P. loewi Meunier, 1922
- † P. macrocera Meunier, 1899
