= Cretamystilus =

Cretamystilus Temporal range: Cenomanian, 99 Ma

Scientific classification
- Domain: Eukaryota
- Kingdom: Animalia
- Phylum: Arthropoda
- Class: Insecta
- Order: Hemiptera
- Suborder: Heteroptera
- Family: Miridae
- Genus: †Cretamystilus; Kim, Lim & Jung, 2021
- Species: †C. herczeki

Binomial name
- †Cretamystilus herczeki Kim, Lim & Jung, 2021

Extinct genus of true bugs

Cretamystilus (meaning "Cretaceous Mystilus") is an extinct genus of mirid insect in the tribe Mecistoscelini known from a fossil preserved in a piece of Cenomanian (Late Cretaceous) Burmese amber from the Hukawng Valley, Myanmar. Cretamystilus, which was the first extinct genus to be named in 2021, contains a single species, C. herczeki. Cretamystilus is the first member of the Miridae in the fossil record known to date. It probably had a host association with bamboo plants, which is only hypothesized, and morphological characters of the holotype and similarity to the extant genus Mystilus (Distant, 1904) are also present in Cretamystilus.
