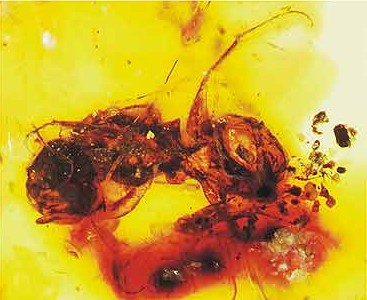

Scientific classification
- Kingdom: Animalia
- Phylum: Arthropoda
- Clade: Pancrustacea
- Class: Insecta
- Order: Hymenoptera
- Infraorder: Aculeata
- Family: †Melittosphecidae; Poinar & Danforth, 2006
- Genus: †Melittosphex; Poinar & Danforth, 2006
- Species: †M. burmensis

Binomial name
- †Melittosphex burmensis Poinar & Danforth, 2006

= Melittosphex =

Melittosphex Temporal range: Upper Cretaceous (Cenomanian?) 92 Ma

Extinct species of bee

Melittosphex is an aculeate wasp genus, the only genus in the family Melittosphecidae, that contains only one species, Melittosphex burmensis, which was formerly considered one of the two oldest-known species of bees. The species was described from an inclusion in Burmese amber in the year 2006 by George Poinar Jr., a zoologist at Oregon State University. The fossil was found in a mine in the Hukawng Valley of northern Myanmar and is believed to date from the Cretaceous Period, 100 million years ago.

== Etymology ==
Melitta is a form of the Greek word μέλισσα (melissa), "honey bee", while Sphex is a transliteration of the Greek word σφήξ, wasp.

== Description ==
Melittosphex is approximately one-fifth the size of the extant honeybee, at about 3 millimetres long. Mellitosphex has some anatomical features similar to those of flesh-eating wasps, including the shape of its hind legs, but also some features of pollen-collecting bees, such as branched hairs on the body.

The sample discovered is thought to be 100 million years old, 40 million years older than the oldest known bee species. Subsequent research has rejected the claim that Melittosphex is a bee, or even a member of the superfamily Apoidea to which bees belong, instead treating the lineage as incertae sedis within the Aculeata.
