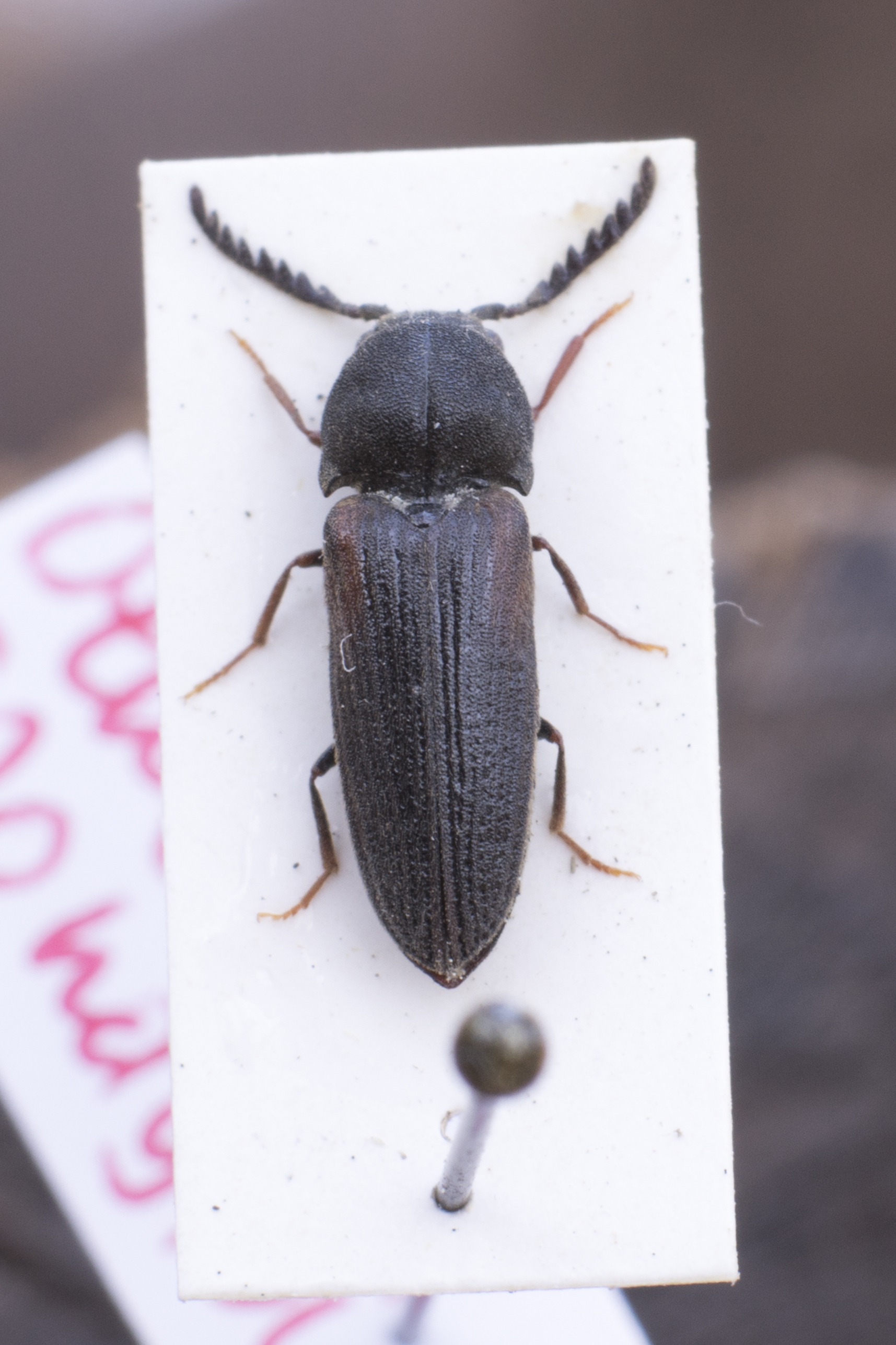
- Otho sphondyloides

Scientific classification
- Kingdom: Animalia
- Phylum: Arthropoda
- Clade: Pancrustacea
- Class: Insecta
- Order: Coleoptera
- Suborder: Polyphaga
- Infraorder: Elateriformia
- Family: Eucnemidae
- Subfamily: Melasinae
- Tribe: Calyptocerini
- Genus: Otho; Lacordaire (1857)

Species
- see text

Synonyms
- Otho Kiesenwetter, 1858

= Otho (beetle) =

Genus of beetles

Otho is a genus of Palaearctic and Indomalayan false click beetle in the Eucnemidae family, erected by Jean Théodore Lacordaire in 1857. Species have been recorded from Eastern Europe, Siberia, East Asia, South Asia, Indochina, and Malesia.

== Description ==
=== Habitus ===
On species in Otho, the body as a whole is elongate, making it oblong, and cylindrical. Posteriorly, it narrows conspicuously.

=== Head ===
The frontoclypeal region's apical margin has a minuscule trilobed division. The area is twice as wide at the apex as between the antennal sockets. The antennae are 11-segmented. The shape of the antennae can either be pectinate or flabellate/strongly serrate in segments IV-X. The antennomeres II and III are short in length and subequal. They are short enough to measure shorter combined than antennomere IV. A medio-longitudinal keel spans the frons, sometimes along with the vertex and clypeus. The epistome (part directly behind the labrum) is strongly narrowed. On the sides, it is bordered by a thin keel, meanwhile anteriorly, it is sinuous in the middle. The last segment of the maxillary palps is securiform.

=== Thorax ===
The pronotum’s hypomera (portion of the pronotum inflexed ventrally due to lateral folding, visible from the ventral side as a result), including the propectus (propleuron and prosternum), lack antennal grooves. They narrow craniad (towards the head). The pronotum is strongly convex and has a median groove. The prosternal sutures are simple. In the mesothorax, the mesepisterna and mesepimeron are fused together. Ending with the metathorax, the metathoracic coxal plates are wider laterally than medially and are parallel-sided. The plates push slightly upward the posterior parts of the episternums (postepisternums). This genus shares a similar shape of the plates, only slightly expanded on the inside and not narrowed on the outside, with Xylobius and Hylochares. Bearing in mind these connections, Kiesenwetter identifies a possible grouping of these three genera which he deems fairly natural. Species in Otho distinctively have the plates slightly expanded or dilated outward. The last visible ventrite is strongly produced.

=== Legs and aedeagus ===
The only areas of the mesothoracic and metathoracic tibiae with setae are the lateral surfaces. In males, the first protarsomere lacks a sex comb. The first tarsomeres of the hind legs are especially long, often as long as the others combined. The male aedeagus is dorsoventrally compressed in shape, creating a bulbous appearance. It has simple and entire lateral lobes unaccompanied by secondary lateral lobes, along with a simple median lobe usually pointed at the apex to form a triangular or globular shape. At the apex, the lateral lobes are non-bilobed. The flagellum of the aedeagus is complex and broad. The aedeagus often has comb-like processes.

== Phylogeny and evolution ==
In Jyrki Elias Muona's phylogeny of Eucnemidae based on male genitalia, Otho is one of the 15 genera that fall under Melasis, the first of the six groups in the system. This group's genitalia are characterized by a free median lobe and short and stout median struts often present. Muona's classification relates Otho with Hemiopsida, Phlegon, Epiphanis, Ceratotaxia, Isoriphis, Melasis, Xylophilus, Bioxylus, Hylochares, Phyllocerus, Anelastes, Palaeoxenus, Hylis, and Euryptychus. Otho is also included in the Zhang et al. 2018 cladogram of Coleoptera, where it is the sister group to Hemiopsida and has Anischia as its outgroup. Muona's (1991) study of Asian and Pacific Eucnemidae, with a focus on the Laurasia-Gondwana break-up model, divides Otho into two groups. One has the more northern Otho sphondyloides and the other has the Vietnamese Otho coomani and four other southern species. Muona categorizes the Otho genus as one of six Laurasian invaders. He speculates that the Laurasian branch came first and colonized the south. This eventually gave rise to the southern branch.

== Taxonomy ==
The type species, Otho sphondyloides, was originally part of the Melasis genus, as Melasis sphondyloides, until Lacordaire decided that it be moved to the new, separate genus. In doing so, he counteracted confusion with the Microrhagus genus. Previously, he noticed, the species had sometimes been wrongly placed within Microrhagus in specimen collections. Lacordaire got the name Otho from Faustin de La Ferté-Sénectère's collection, which set apart the species into its own genus and listed the genus as Otho. However, the etymology is unknown. In 1858, Ernst August Hellmuth von Kiesenwetter, the alternative taxon authority, derived the name from the same collection as Lacordaire did. Since he was the first to describe the genus for identification, while Lacordaire only formed and named the genus, some writers have credited Kiesenwetter as the taxon authority with the junior synonym Otho Kiesenwetter, 1858. Otho was in the tribe Xylobiini, until Jyrki Muona in 1993 formed Calyptocerini, the current tribe.

=== List of species ===
Sources:

- Otho amamiensis (Nakane, 1987)
- Otho borneensis (Lucht, 1989)
- Otho coomani (Fleutiaux, 1924)
- Otho dohertyi (Flentiaux, 1899)
- Otho himalayensis (Lucht, 1989)
- Otho modiglianii (Flentiaux, 1896)
- Otho nipponicus (Fleutiaux, 1923)
- Otho opacus (Lucht, 1989)
- Otho rutriclypeus (Muona & Meng, 2023)
- Otho sibiricus (Motschulsky, 1845)
- Otho sphondyloides (Germar, 1818)
