= Melasis fermini =

Conservation status
- Vulnerable (IUCN 3.1)

Scientific classification
- Kingdom: Animalia
- Phylum: Arthropoda
- Class: Insecta
- Order: Coleoptera
- Suborder: Polyphaga
- Infraorder: Elateriformia
- Family: Eucnemidae
- Genus: Melasis
- Species: M. fermini

Binomial name
- Melasis fermini Sanchez-Ruiz & de la Rosa (2003)

Species of beetle

Melasis fermini is a rare species of soldier beetles native to a small area of Spain. It has only been found in three locations in Guadalajara, Caceres, and Ciudad Real, and its estimated range is less than twelve square kilometers. The species was named in honor of the late Fermín Martín Piera, a Spanish biologist and taxonomist who specialized in the study of dung beetles.

== Description ==
=== Male ===
Males of the species are small, measuring 4–4.4 millimetres (0.16–0.17 in) long by 1.1–1.2 millimetres (0.043–0.047 in) wide. They are mostly parallel for almost their entire length. They have dark ventral regions of a slightly lighter color than the pronotum. The body is covered in fine, short hairs of a golden color.

Their head is black and the pronotum is black or dark brown with hints of red. The vertical head is deeply embedded in the pronotum. The pronotum is wider than it is long, and it is widest at the front third. A line runs longitudinally down the pronotum, and there are divergent acute angles near the rear of the pronotum in front of which it is sinuate (wavy with notches and lobes). There is a uniform dotted texture to the pronotum which is superficial and umbilicated, giving the pronotum a rough appearance. The front edge of the pronotum rises in a thornlike manner.

Their elytra are much lighter color than the pronotum, of an orange-reddish color akin to chestnut. They have small marked grooves along their surface, though these do not form a clear line from one end to the other. Rather, they are present from the center region of the elytra to the apex. In some cases, these grooves join or separate. Between these grooves the elytra is almost flat, with only a very slightly rough appearance. The antennae and legs are of a color similar to the elytra. The legs are very flat, and their femurs have a lateral line cup.

=== Female ===
The females of the species are similar in appearance to the males, but are slightly larger. They measure 5–5.3 millimetres (0.20–0.21 in) long by 1.3–1.4 millimetres (0.051–0.055 in). There are also small differences in the shape of their antennae and pronata.

=== Similar species ===
Melasis fermini is most closely related in morphology to M. buprestoides, but can be told apart by a few key differences. Its antenna have the fewest pectinate projections of any in the genus and it is the smallest species in the genus. Additionally, its aedeagus is of a different form and color, that being an orange-brown or reddish-tan.

== Distribution and habitat ==
Melasis fermini is one of two species of the genus Melasis to be present on the European continent, along with M. buprestoides. It is presumed to have a discontinuous and scattered distribution within a relatively small area of Spain.

In general, the species lives on dead wood of deciduous trees which have been decomposing for several years in areas of high humidity and protection from the elements (especially direct sunlight). It can be found at elevations of 700–1,500 metres (770–1,640 yd) above sea level. The type specimen of the species was collected inside a beech trunk on the ground in an area with moist and shady soil, such that the wood was extremely decomposed. M. fermini has also been collected from the bottom of a standing alder trunk which had been dead for roughly two years.

Collected Specimens of M. fermini
Specimen	Locality	Collector	Date of Collection	Current location
Holotype	Cantalojas, Guadalajara	Juan J. de la Rosa	23 June 1996	National Museum of Natural Sciences
Paratype 1	Villar del Pedroso, Caceres	Juan J. de la Rosa	16 May 2002	Collection of Juan J. de la Rosa
Paratype 2	Villar del Pedroso, Caceres	Juan J. de la Rosa	16 May 2002	National Museum of Natural Sciences

== Ecology ==
The diet of Melasis fermini is not fully understood. While they live on dead wood, their jaws are shaped such that a type of liquid feeding is most likely. This makes the prospect of predation unlikely, since the jaws are not opposed. It is therefore postulated that the wood they eat is decomposed externally and then consumed in liquid form. Only very specific types of wood would allow for this kind of diet, making the species especially vulnerable.

The species was assessed by the IUCN Red List on 3 December 2015 and listed as Vulnerable to extinction. The IUCN noted a trend of decline in the quality and area of the species' habitat. Specifically, it is threatened by the continued logging of its habitat and forest management techniques that remove the dead wood on which they live. The species is currently under no protections, and does not have any habitat areas which are protected from development or destruction.
