= E. cornutus =

E. cornutus may refer to:

- Eleutherodactylus cornutus, a frog species
- Eobasileus cornutus, an extinct mammal species
- Epiphanis cornutus, a beetle species in the genus Epiphanis
- Eriauchenius cornutus, a spider species in the genus eriauchenius
- Eunymphicus cornutus, a parakeet species
- Euonymus cornutus, a tree species in the genus Euonymus

== See also ==
- Cornutus (disambiguation)
