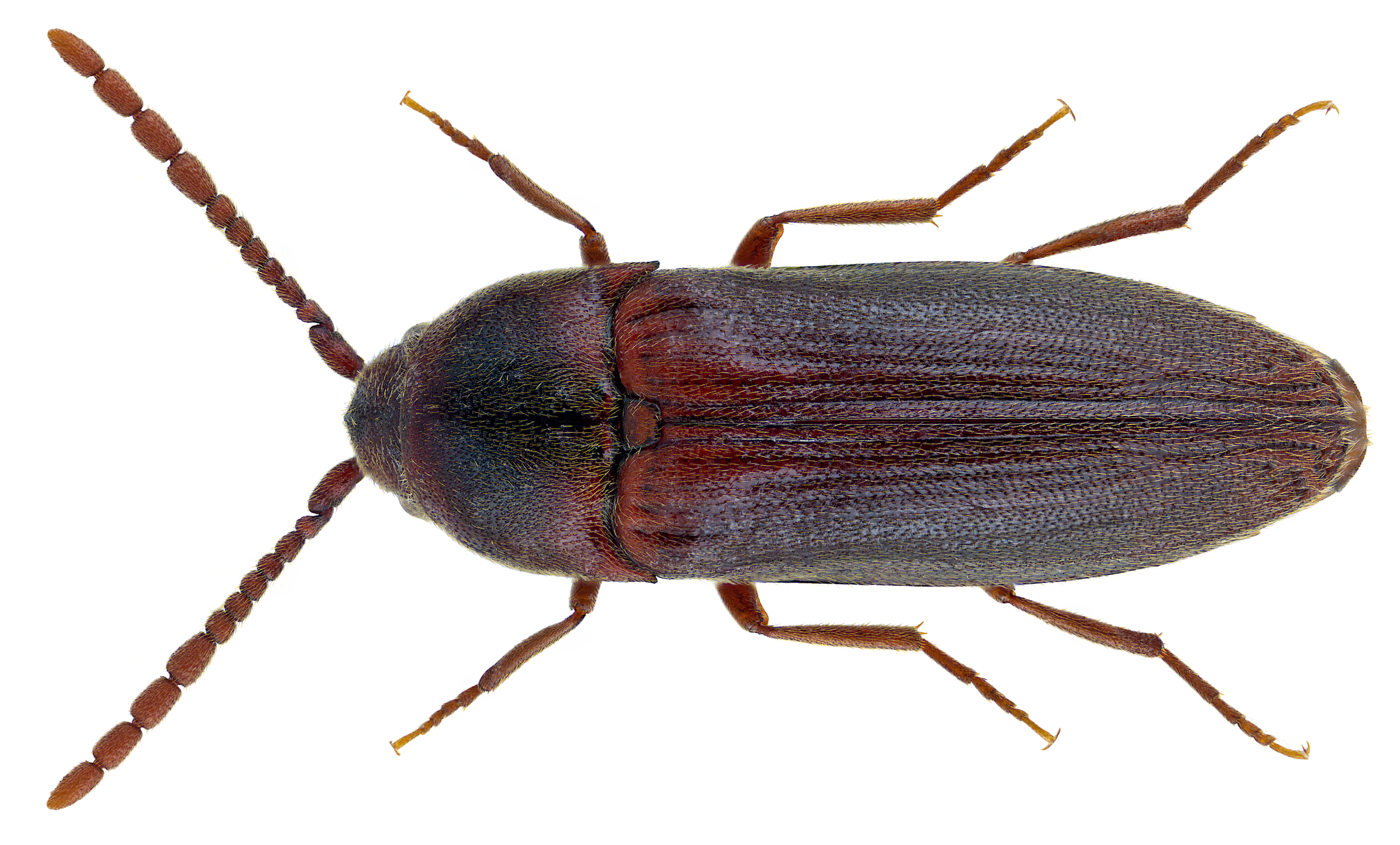

Scientific classification
- Domain: Eukaryota
- Kingdom: Animalia
- Phylum: Arthropoda
- Class: Insecta
- Order: Coleoptera
- Suborder: Polyphaga
- Infraorder: Elateriformia
- Family: Eucnemidae
- Subfamily: Melasinae
- Tribe: Epiphanini
- Genus: Epiphanis
- Species: E. cornutus

Binomial name
- Epiphanis cornutus Eschscholtz, 1829

= Epiphanis cornutus =

Species of beetle

Epiphanis cornutus is a species of false click beetle in the family Eucnemidae, found in Europe (including the British Isles) and North America.
