= Heterotaxis =

Scientific classification
- Domain: Eukaryota
- Kingdom: Animalia
- Phylum: Arthropoda
- Class: Insecta
- Order: Coleoptera
- Suborder: Polyphaga
- Infraorder: Elateriformia
- Family: Eucnemidae
- Subfamily: Macraulacinae
- Tribe: Macraulacini
- Genus: Heterotaxis; Bonvouloir, 1875

Type species
- Heterotaxis myrmidon Bonvouloir, 1875

Genus of beetles

Heterotaxis is a genus of mostly Asian click beetle allies in the subfamily Macraulacinae and tribe Macraulacini, erected by Viscount Henri Achard de Bonvouloir in 1875.

== Species ==
The following species are recognized in this genus:

- Heterotaxis dubia Fleutiaux, 1896
- Heterotaxis elongata Otto, 2016
- Heterotaxis myrmidon Bonvouloir, 1875
- Heterotaxis nipparensis Hisamatsu, 1957
