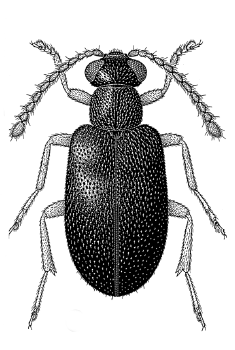

Scientific classification
- Kingdom: Animalia
- Phylum: Arthropoda
- Class: Insecta
- Order: Coleoptera
- Suborder: Polyphaga
- Infraorder: Elateriformia
- Family: Eucnemidae
- Genus: Xylophilus
- Species: X. luniger

Binomial name
- Xylophilus luniger Champion, 1916

= Xylophilus luniger =

Species of beetle

Xylophilus luniger is a beetle that is endemic to New Zealand. This member of the family Aderidae is commonly collected by beating vegetation around the margins of native forest. The species has been collected in the North Island only.

== Taxonomy ==
This species was described by the British entomologist George Champion in 1916. X. luniger is one of at least 9 species found in the genus Xylophilus in New Zealand.

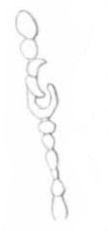
In males of Xylophilus luniger, antennomeres 7-9 are highly modified.

== Biology ==
The adult beetle is 1.33-1.66 millimetres in length and 0.6-0.8 millimetres in width.

Xylophilus luniger is sexually dimorphic; many male members of the genus Xylophilus have strangely modified antennae while females have unmodified straight antennae. In males of Xylophilus luniger, antennomeres 7-9 are highly modified.
