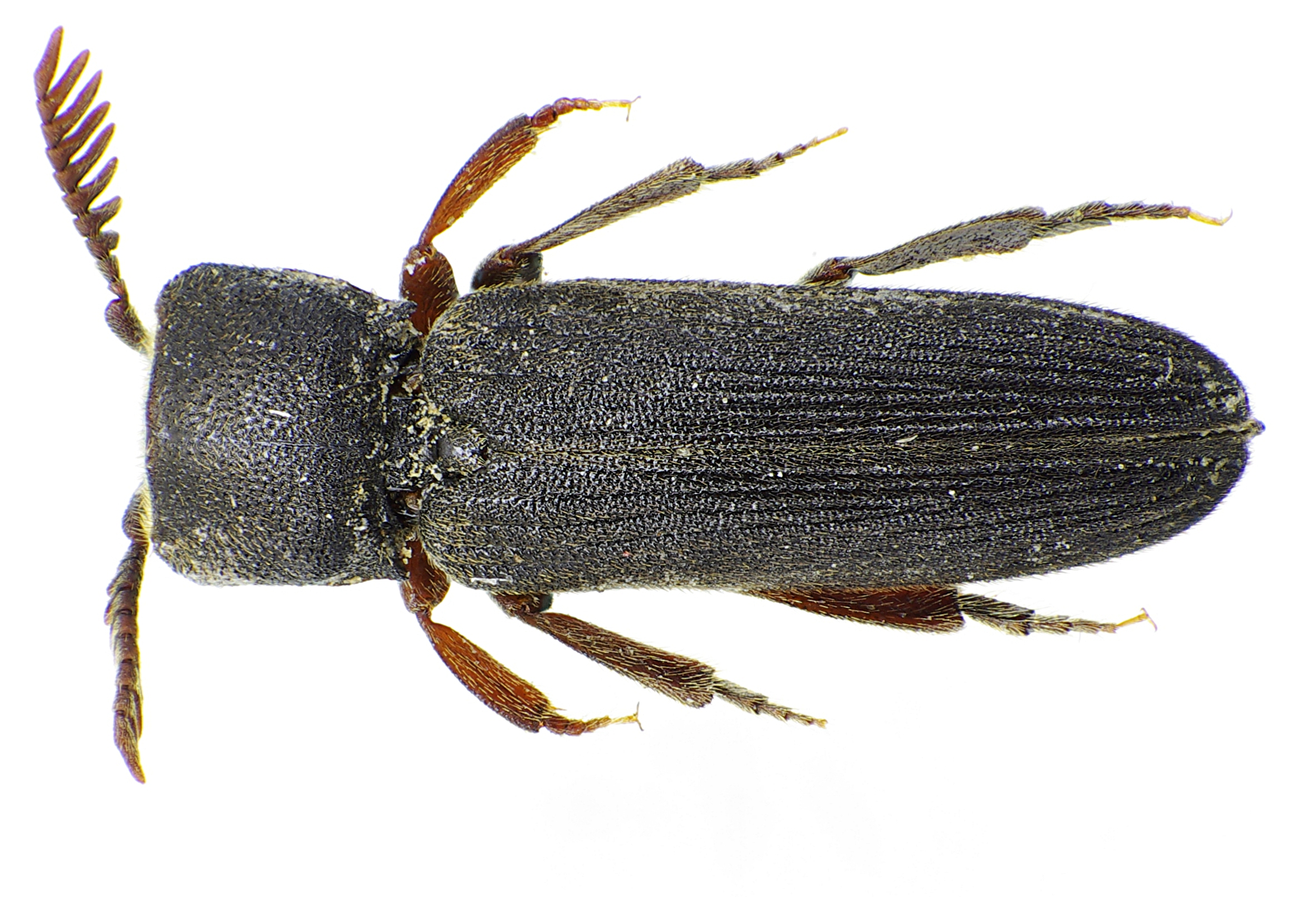
- Melasis bupestroides

Scientific classification
- Kingdom: Animalia
- Phylum: Arthropoda
- Class: Insecta
- Order: Coleoptera
- Suborder: Polyphaga
- Infraorder: Elateriformia
- Family: Eucnemidae
- Subfamily: Melasinae
- Tribe: Melasini
- Genus: Melasis
- Species: M. buprestoides

Binomial name
- Melasis buprestoides (Linnaeus, 1761)

= Melasis buprestoides =

Species of beetle

Melasis buprestoides is a species of false click beetles native to Europe.

The species name buprestoides (from the beetle genus Buprestis, and Ancient Greek ειδής eidēs, "like") refers to the species' body shape. Linnaeus's original name for the beetle was Elater buprestoides. The genus name Melasis (from Ancient Greek μέλας mélas, "black") refers to the black color of the member species' body.

== Description ==
The cylindrical beetle is between six and nine millimeters long. The body's greatest width occurs on the leading edge of the scutum.
