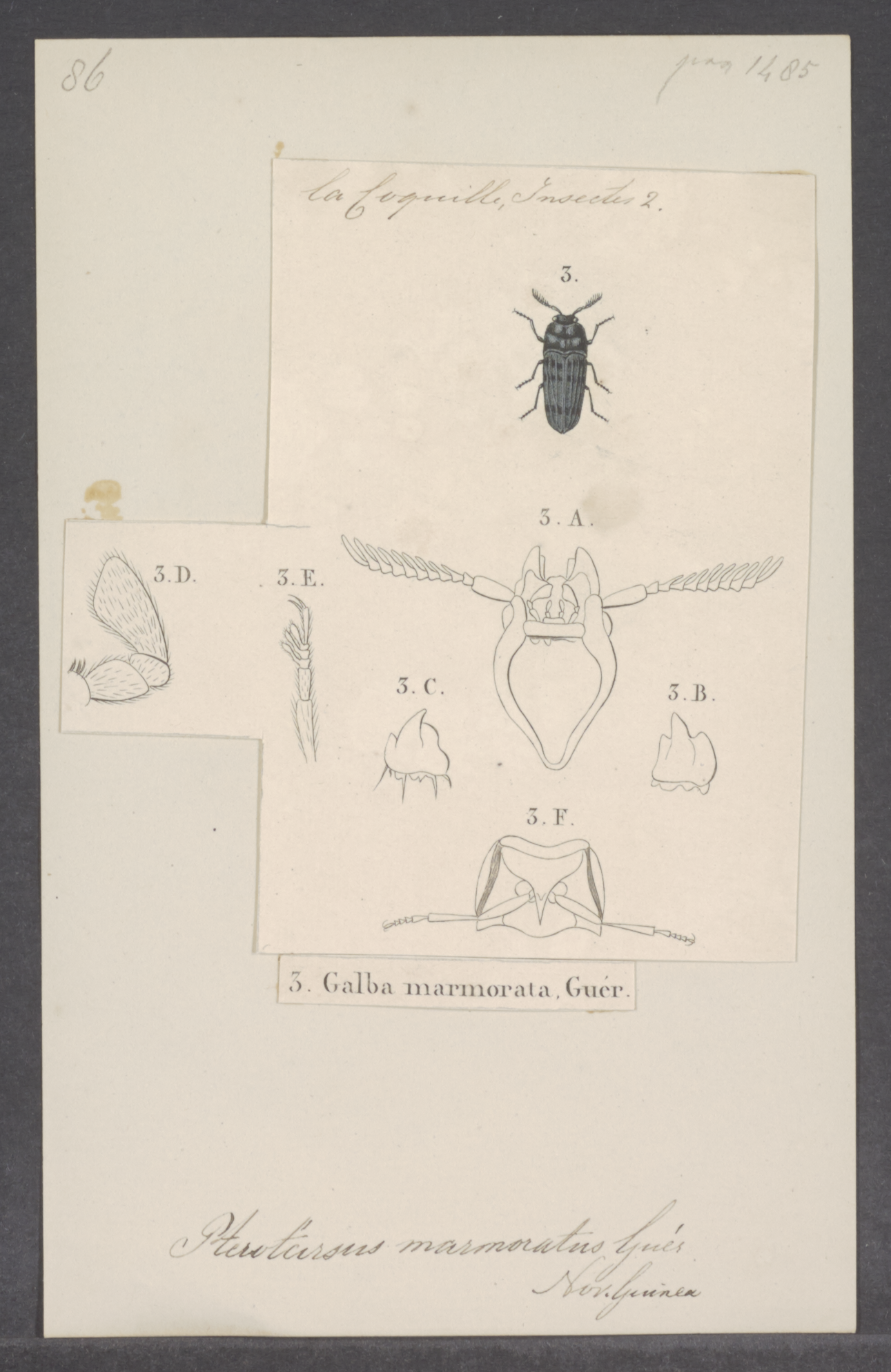
- Galbites marmoratus (previously Galba marmorata)

Scientific classification
- Domain: Eukaryota
- Kingdom: Animalia
- Phylum: Arthropoda
- Class: Insecta
- Order: Coleoptera
- Suborder: Polyphaga
- Infraorder: Elateriformia
- Family: Eucnemidae
- Subfamily: Eucneminae
- Genus: Galbites; Fleutiaux, 1918

Synonyms
- Galba Guérin, 1830; Galba Latreille, 1829

= Galbites =

Genus of beetles

Galbites is a genus of mostly Asian click beetle allies in the subfamily Eucneminae and typical of the tribe Galbitini, erected by Edmond Fleutiaux in 1918. Species have been recorded from Indochina, Malesia, New Guinea and northern Australia.

== Species ==
The Global Biodiversity Information Facility lists:

1. Galbites australiae (Lea, 1919)
2. Galbites chevrolati (Fleutiaux, 1923)
3. Galbites girardi Muona, 1991
4. Galbites gressitti Muona, 1991
5. Galbites marmoratus Guérin, 1830
6. Galbites menieri Muona, 1991
7. Galbites nigrita Muona, 1991
8. Galbites samuelsoni Muona, 1991
9. Galbites sauteri Muona, 1991
10. Galbites sedlaceki Muona, 1991
11. Galbites tigrina Muona, 1991
12. Galbites tomentosa (Montrouzier, 1855)
13. Galbites tuberculata (Redtenbacher, 1868)
14. Galbites wallacei (Perroud & Montrouzier, 1864)
15. Galbites wilsoni Muona, 1991
