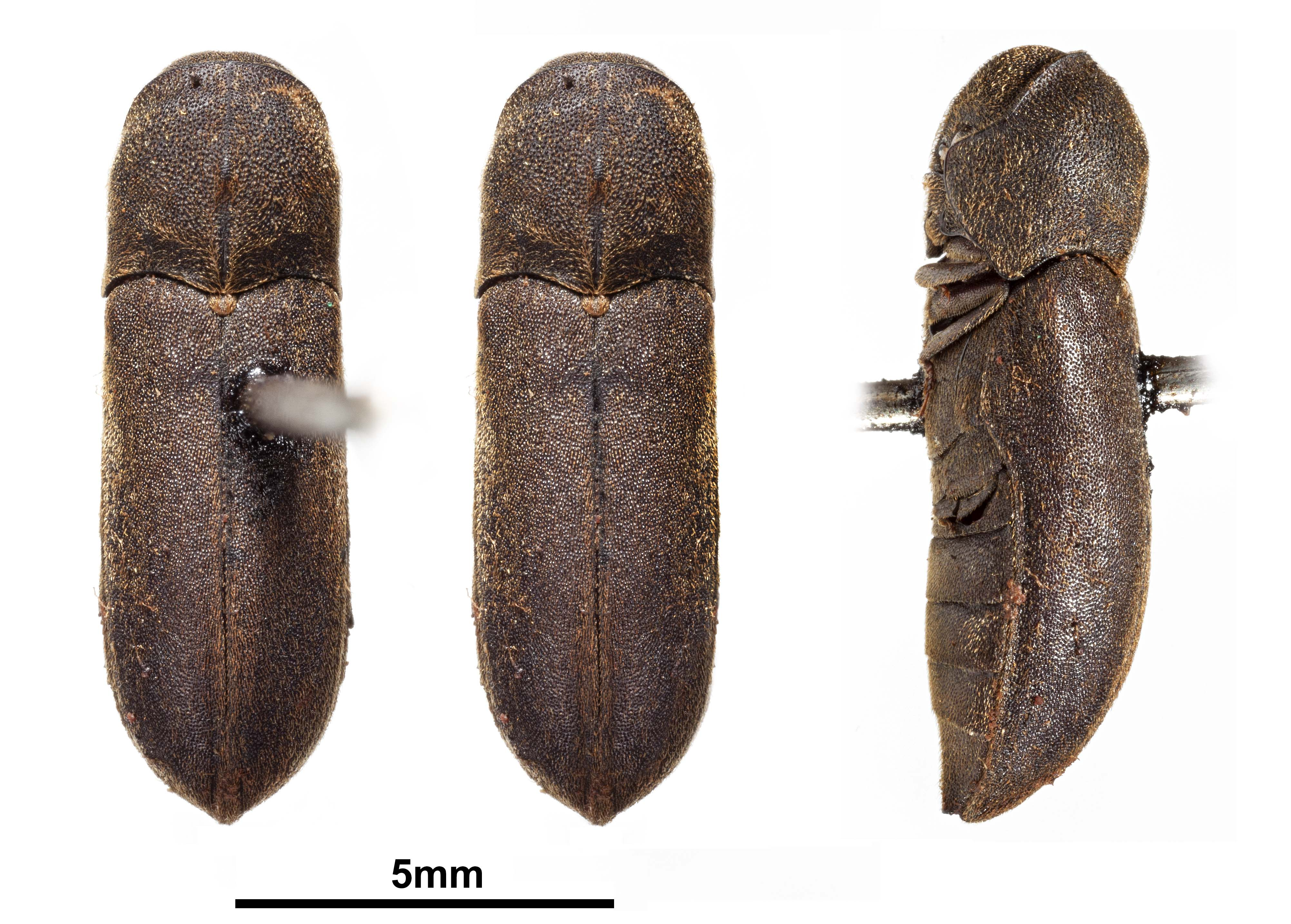
- Dendrocharis rouyeri

Scientific classification
- Domain: Eukaryota
- Kingdom: Animalia
- Phylum: Arthropoda
- Class: Insecta
- Order: Coleoptera
- Suborder: Polyphaga
- Infraorder: Elateriformia
- Family: Eucnemidae
- Subfamily: Eucneminae
- Genus: Dendrocharis; Guérin-Ménéville, 1843

= Dendrocharis =

Genus of beetles

Dendrocharis is a genus of Asian click beetle allies in the subfamily Eucneminae and typical of the tribe Dendrocharini; it was erected by Félix Guérin-Méneville in 1843.

== Species ==
1. Dendrocharis alternans Bonvouloir
2. Dendrocharis bicolor Redtenbacher, 1867
3. Dendrocharis bombycina Guérin-Méneville, 1843
4. Dendrocharis flavicornis Guérin-Méneville, 1843
5. Dendrocharis inexspectata Muona, 2000
6. Dendrocharis intermedia Fleutiaux, 1896
7. Dendrocharis jansoni Fleutiaux, 1912
8. Dendrocharis rouyeri Fleutiaux, 1912
