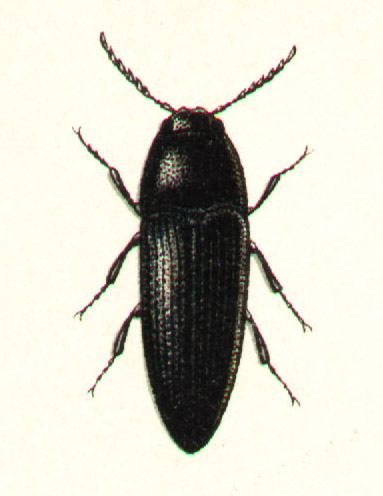
- Eucnemis capucinus

Scientific classification
- Kingdom: Animalia
- Phylum: Arthropoda
- Clade: Pancrustacea
- Class: Insecta
- Order: Coleoptera
- Suborder: Polyphaga
- Infraorder: Elateriformia
- Superfamily: Elateroidea
- Family: Eucnemidae
- Subfamily: Eucneminae; Eschscholtz, 1829

= Eucneminae =

Subfamily of beetles

External image
- Images at iNaturalist

The Eucneminae are a subfamily of "false click beetle" genera, erected by Johann von Eschscholtz in 1889.

== Tribes and genera ==
Ten tribes are included in BioLib.cz:

Dendrocharini Fleutiaux, 1920

1. Bossionus Fleutiaux, 1922
2. Buckia Cobos, 1956
3. Dendrocharis Guérin-Ménéville, 1843
4. Scopulifer Fleutiaux, 1896

Dyscharachthini Muona, 1993

1. Dyscharachthis Blackburn, 1900

Entomosatopini Muona, 1993

1. Entomosatopus Bonvouloir, 1871

Eucnemini Eschscholtz, 1829

1. Epipleurus Fleutiaux, 1928
2. Eucnemis Ahrens, 1812 - type genus

Galbitini Muona, 1991

1. Achaica Muona, 1991
2. Agastocerus Bonvouloir, 1871
3. Galbimorpha Fleutiaux, 1920
4. Galbites Fleutiaux, 1918

=== Mesogenini ===
Authority: Muona, 1993

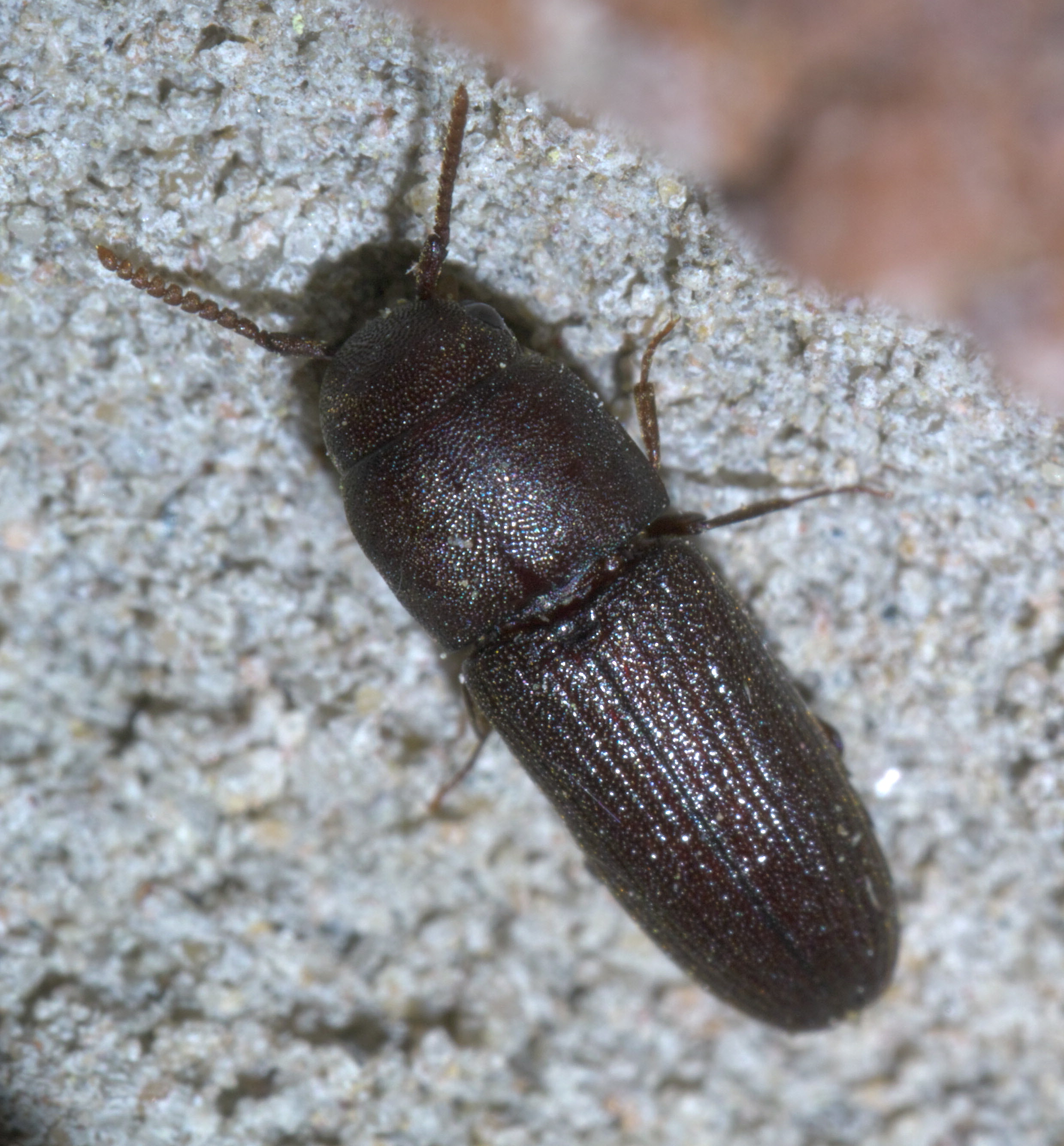
Stethon pectorosus

1. Anabolodes Strand, 1928
2. Arisus Bonvouloir, 1871
3. Baryus Fleutiaux, 1921
4. Chropoecilus Fleutiaux, 1902
5. Euryostus Bonvouloir, 1871
6. Feaia Fleutiaux, 1896
7. Mesogenus Bonvouloir, 1871
8. Stethon LeConte, 1866
9. Submesogenus Fleutiaux, 1921
10. Temnillus Bonvouloir, 1871
11. Temnus Fleutiaux, 1920
12. Vitellius (beetle) Bonvouloir, 1871

Muonajini Özdikmen, 2008

1. Muonaja Özdikmen, 2008

Note: Yanga Muona, 1993 - preoccupied by Yanga (cicada) Distant, 1904

Perrotiini Muona, 1993

1. Perrotius Fleutiaux, 1938

Phaenocerini Muona, 1993

1. Phaenocerus Bonvouloir, 1871
2. Pinaroo Muona, 1993

Proutianini Muona, 1993

1. Myall Muona, 1993
2. Onya Muona, 1993
3. Proutianus Muona, 1993 - monotypic Proutianus americanus (Horn, 1872)
