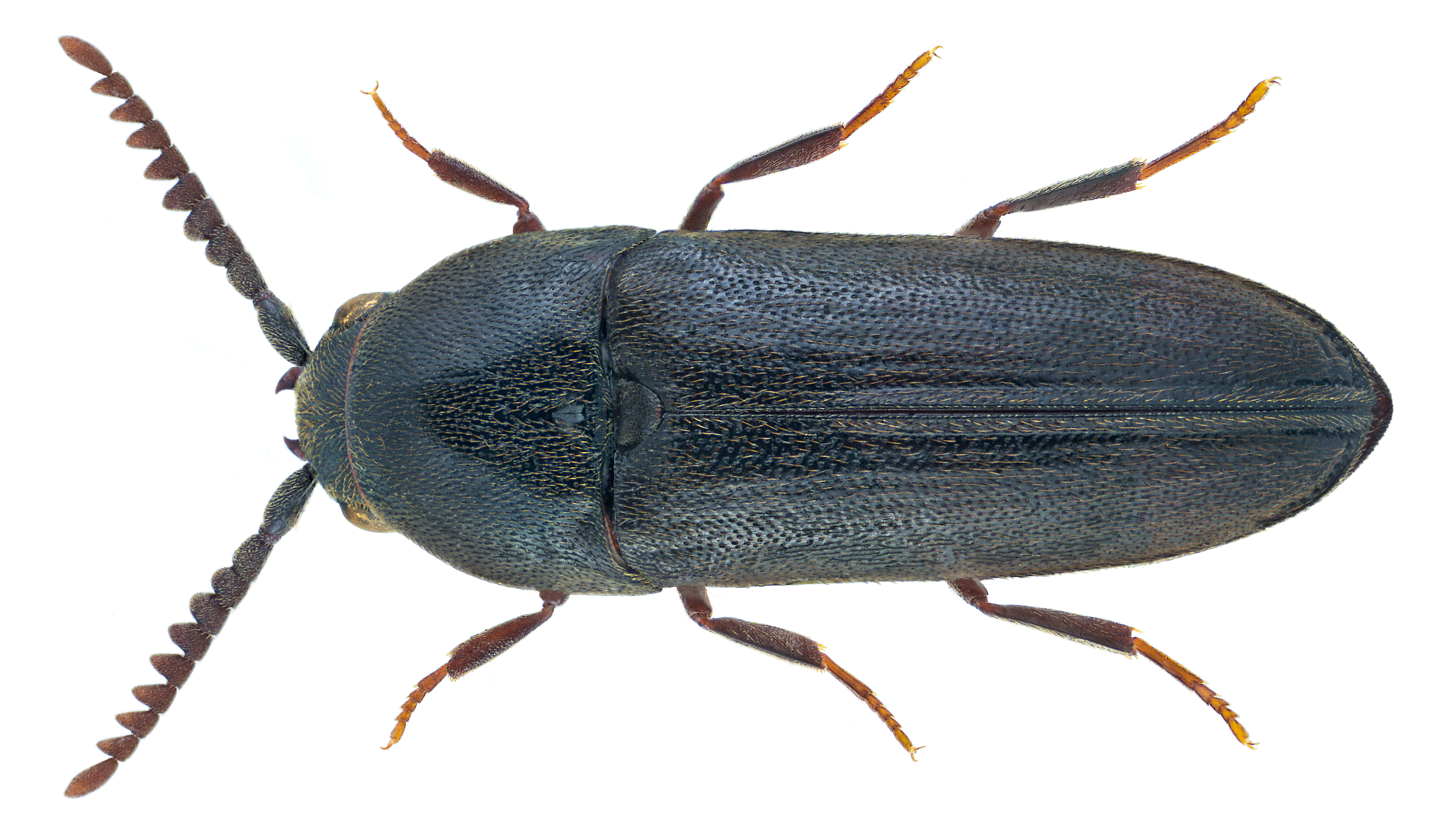
- Eucnemis capucina

Scientific classification
- Kingdom: Animalia
- Phylum: Arthropoda
- Class: Insecta
- Order: Coleoptera
- Suborder: Polyphaga
- Infraorder: Elateriformia
- Superfamily: Elateroidea
- Family: Eucnemidae
- Subfamily: Eucneminae
- Genus: Eucnemis; Ahrens, 1812

Synonyms
- Euchnemis Comolli, 1837

= Eucnemis =

Genus of beetles

Eucnemis is a genus of mostly Palaearctic click beetle allies in the subfamily Eucneminae, erected by August Ahrens in 1812.

== Species ==
The Global Biodiversity Information Facility lists:

1. Eucnemis americana Horn, 1886
2. Eucnemis capucina Ahrens, 1812 - type species (as Eucnemis capucinus Ahrens)
3. Eucnemis quadricollis Say, 1839
4. Eucnemis zaitzevi Mamaev, 1976
