= Scopulifer =

Scientific classification
- Domain: Eukaryota
- Kingdom: Animalia
- Phylum: Arthropoda
- Class: Insecta
- Order: Coleoptera
- Suborder: Polyphaga
- Infraorder: Elateriformia
- Family: Eucnemidae
- Subfamily: Eucneminae
- Genus: Scopulifer; Fleutiaux, 1896

Genus of beetles

Scopulifer is a genus of Asian click beetle allies in the subfamily Eucneminae and tribe Dendrocharini, erected by Edmond Fleutiaux in 1896.

Note This genus should not be confused with the genus of African skipper butterflies: Scopulifera Libert, 2014 - (tribe Celaenorrhinini).

== Species ==
1. Scopulifer alternans (Bonvouloir, 1875)
2. Scopulifer asiaticus Otto, 2016
3. Scopulifer atkinsoni Fleutiaux, 1912
4. Scopulifer laosianus Otto, 2016
