= Sarfus =

Scientific classification
- Kingdom: Animalia
- Phylum: Arthropoda
- Class: Insecta
- Order: Coleoptera
- Suborder: Polyphaga
- Infraorder: Elateriformia
- Family: Eucnemidae
- Subfamily: Melasinae
- Tribe: Dirhagini
- Genus: Sarfus; Fleutiaux, 1925

Genus of beetles

Sarfus is a genus of click beetle allies in the subfamily Melasinae and tribe Dirhagini, erected by Edmond Fleutiaux in 1925.
