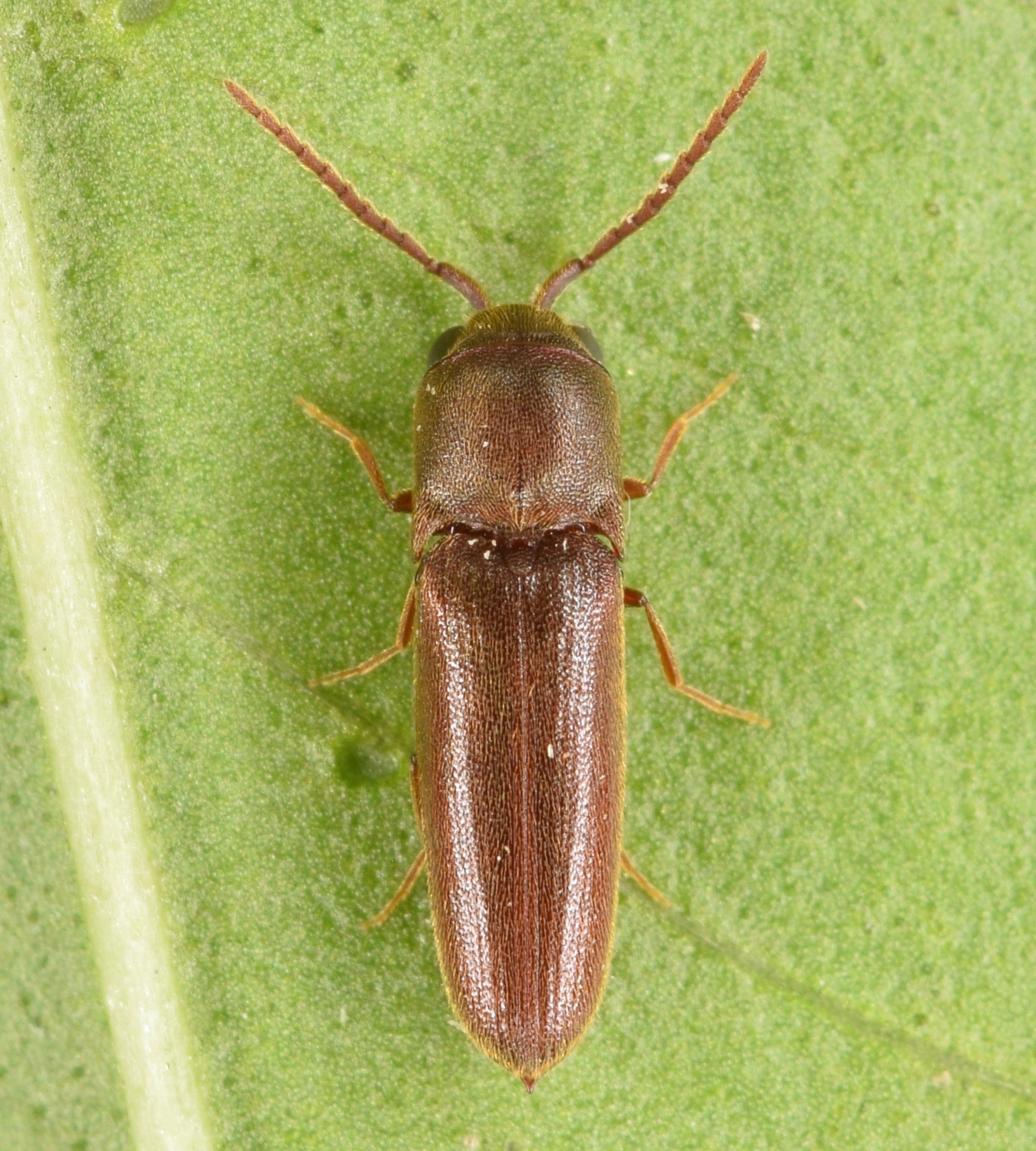
- Dirrhagofarsus sp.

Scientific classification
- Kingdom: Animalia
- Phylum: Arthropoda
- Class: Insecta
- Order: Coleoptera
- Suborder: Polyphaga
- Infraorder: Elateriformia
- Family: Eucnemidae
- Subfamily: Melasinae
- Tribe: Dirhagini
- Genus: Dirrhagofarsus; Fleutiaux, 1935

= Dirrhagofarsus =

Genus of beetles

Dirrhagofarsus is a genus of beetles belonging to the family Eucnemidae.

The species of this genus are found in Europe and Northern America.

Species:

- Dirrhagofarsus attenuatus (Mäklin, 1845)
- Dirrhagofarsus ernae Fleutiaux, 1935
