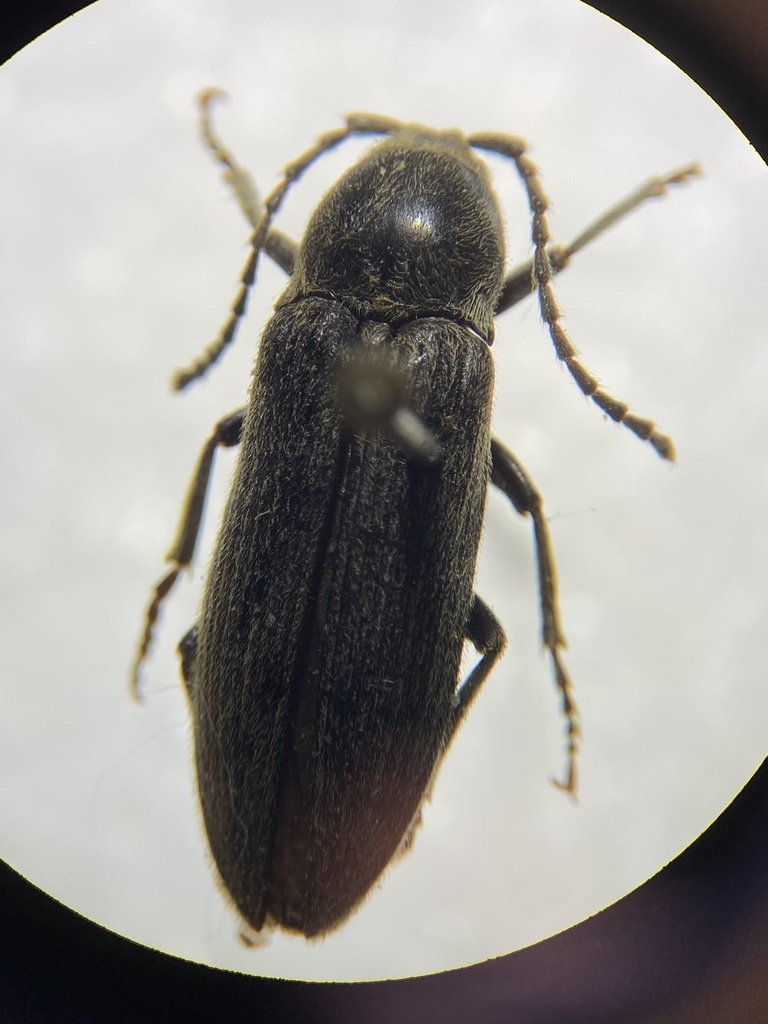
- Perothops muscidus

Scientific classification
- Kingdom: Animalia
- Phylum: Arthropoda
- Clade: Pancrustacea
- Class: Insecta
- Order: Coleoptera
- Suborder: Polyphaga
- Infraorder: Elateriformia
- Family: Eucnemidae
- Subfamily: Perothopinae; Lacordaire, 1857
- Genus: Perothops; Eschscholtz, 1836

= Perothops =

Genus of beetles

Perothops is a genus of false click beetles in the family Eucnemidae containing 3 species. They are known as beech-tree beetles or perothopid beetles. They are small as they are only 10–18 millimeters long. It is the only genus in the monotypic subfamily Perothopinae. They are dark-colored beetles that are found across the United States, generally in forests. The genus was discovered by Johann Friedrich von Eschscholtz in 1836. It used to be considered a family not part of Eucnemidae. The genus's name is from Greek, translating to "maimed/crippled eye" or "eye of little necklaces/bands", referring to the placement of perothopid eyes.

== Adult morphology ==
=== General description ===
These beetles are small, measuring 10–18 mm in length. Their bodies are slightly flattened or somewhat convex, with sides that are not evenly curved. They cannot roll into a ball and their upper surfaces are covered in hairs, setae, or scales, but not stiff bristles. They lack deep grooves or pits on their upper surfaces.

=== Head and mouthparts ===
The head is not wider than the prothorax, or the first segment of the thorax, and is moderately to strongly declined. It has no snout or neck, and the temples are either absent or not closely pressed against the prothorax. There are no ridges on the top of the head, and the beetles do not have a stridulatory file, a part used to make sound. The eyes are large and protuberant, with finely facetted ommatidia, and the antennae are 11-segmented and reach past the middle of the prothorax but not the middle of the elytra. They are shaped like thread and may have single branches on some segments.

The mouthparts are not modified for piercing or sucking. The mandibles are moderately long and curved, with a simple incisor edge. The maxillae have distinct paired appendages and the labial palps, =which are also paired appendages, are slightly to strongly expanded at the tip.

=== Prothorax and pterothorax ===
The prothorax is wider at the back than at the front, and the sides are more or less straight. There are no deep pits or grooves on the sides or disc of the pronotum – the anterior angles are absent or rounded, and the posterior angles are acute and strongly produced. The pronotum has no average lengthwise groove or line.

The scutellum, a posterior part of the thorax, is well-developed and abruptly elevated. The mesoventrite, a hard plate of the thorax, is divided by a lengthwise groove and has a large and deep cavity. The metaventrite, another hard plate of the thorax, is longer than the first abdominal ventrite, or hard plate, and has a moderately to very long average discrimen. The metacoxae, the base of the hind legs, are adjacent or narrowly separated and extend to the side to meet the elytra or sides of the body.

=== Elytra and hind wings ===
The elytra are longer than the prothorax and meet at the ridges of the pointed tip of the elytron. They have more than 5 grooves and the side edge of the elytron is straight or slightly curved.

The hind wings are well-developed as well as their elongate membrane, enclosed by veins on the wing. The center of the hind wing has 5 or 6 free veins. The wedge cell, an enclosed area within of the hind wing, is well-developed and has an acute tip.

=== Legs, abdomen and male genitalia ===
The legs are slender, and the tarsi, the final segments of the legs, are 5-segmented. There are two mesotibial spurs, which are small spine-like projections, and if there are any on them, they are without hair. They can be absent. The claws are paired, subequal in length, and toothed or have narrow projections. The metatibial spurs are single.

The abdomen has 5 visible hard plates, with the first two connate. The 4th hard plate is joined with both the 3rd and the 5th. Perothopids do not have a terminal spine. There are functional spiracles, or small openings, on abdominal segments 5–8.

The male genitalia is three-lobed and symmetrical. Its anterior edges lack any struts or projections. Each side part is joined individually with the base of the male genitalia. It is not curved outwards. The aedeagus, the male genitalia of arthropods, is simple, lacking separate dorsal and ventral lobes. Similar to the base of the penis, the aedeagus's anterior edge also lacks any struts.

== Larvae morphology ==
=== Body ===
Larvae of these species have an elongate and parallel-sided body, exceeding 15 mm in length. The body is circular or slightly flattened in cross-section, not broadly ovate or strongly flattened ventrally. Part of the body is composed solely of fine hairs or setae, and the dorsal surfaces are lightly pigmented or hardened and generally smooth. The ventral surfaces are also lightly pigmented.

=== Head ===
The head is prognathous or slightly declined – protracted or slightly retracted. It is visible from above because it is not concealed by the prothorax. It is narrower than the thorax, lacking a wedge-like, notched plate. The head capsule is strongly depressed and wedge-shaped anteriorly, with a distinct posterior notch, and the top of the head with a lengthwise groove for muscle attachment. V-shaped or U-shaped frontal arms are present and not joined anteriorly or extended to meet the mandibles. The bases of the frontal arms are distinctly separated.

The antennae consist of two segments, with a length-to-head-width ratio of less than 0.15. The antennal segment sensors are present, shorter than the apical segment, and cone or club-shaped. The antennal segment's tip ends abruptly, with the sensors and apical segment arising together. The antennae are separated from the mandibles by a narrow strip of membrane or cuticle. The line separating the top and lower portions of the head shield can be absent or vaguely indicated. The larvae's labrum is completely fused to the head capsule, lacking a crenulate groove. The epipharyngeal rods, or hardened structures inside of the mouth, are absent.

=== Mandibles ===
The mandibles are symmetrical, non-opposable, straight, or curved at the tip. They are diverging and divided lengthwise, narrow and hooked, or possibly broad at the base and narrow at the tip, which is narrow when viewed from the front, with a single lobe or tooth. There is an incisor edge with 1 or 2 teeth located below the tip and the surface of the mandibular base has a brush of hairs or spines. The larvae do not have mandibular molars.

=== Mouthparts ===
In perothopid larvae, the ventral mouthparts are retracted. The cardo (the joint of the maxilla) is either absent, indistinct, or membranous, lying transversely or slightly obliquely and leaving the cardines separated by the labium (lower lip). The stipes are elongated, surpassing their width, and lack a maxillary articulating area. The mala, the single fixed lobe of the maxilla, remains simple at the tip and avoids any clefts, with its inner apical angle also maintaining a basic form. The maxillary palps comprise four segments, with the first lacking a digitiform appendage. The labium itself is formed by the prementum and postmentum, hard plates that are either completely or almost completely fused with the maxillae.

The postmentum, subquadrate or trapezoidal in shape, possesses a blunt posterior edge and avoids lengthwise division. The ligula is absent, while the labial palps (a pair of sensory structures attached to the labium) consist of two segments separated by a distance exceeding the width of the first segment. Additionally, a hypopharyngeal bracon (mouth appendage) is present, although the sclerome is, too, absent. The hypostomal region serves to separate the labium from the thorax, while ventral epicranial ridges and hypostomal rods are absent. Furthermore, the gula, wider than long with distinct gular sutures, is fused to the labium. Finally, the occipital foramen remains undivided by a tentorial bridge.

=== Thorax ===
The prothorax remains narrow or barely surpasses the abdomen in width, and falls short of the combined length of the meso- and metathorax. Additionally, the absence of asperities or carinae on the thoracic terga adds to the streamlined form. Sclerotized plates are absent on the protergum, meso- and metaterga, further emphasizing the reduction of structural complexity. This minimalism extends to the lateral tergal processes, which are either weakly developed or entirely absent. The prosternum also lacks any armature, contributing to the overall smooth body contour.

Further underscoring the streamlined form, the mesocoxae are positioned distinctly apart, separated by a distance exceeding twice their basal diameter. The mesothoracic legs, with their three segments and minimal number of components (five or less including the claw), exemplify this reduction. These highly miniaturized legs, barely reaching 0.2 times the head width in length, further accentuate the larvae's simplified form. Notably, the metathoracic legs mirror the mesothoracic legs in size, and neither pair participates in the formation of stridulatory organs. The rounded or truncated apical leg segments, devoid of any acute or claw-like features, round out this description of the larvae's unique thoracic morphology.

=== Abdomen ===
The abdomen of perothopid larvae exhibits a distinct morphology characterized by specific features. Most notably, the abdomen is elongated and exceeds twice the length of the thorax when appendages are excluded. Ten visible segments are present, with the terga (dorsal plates) not extending laterally beyond the sterna (ventral plates). Notably, the abdomen lacks several defining characteristics, including patches or rows of asperities (roughened areas), well-developed lateral processes, transverse dorsal folds/lobes on the third tergum, paired abdominal glands, balloon-like tracheal gills, long and narrow lateral gills, patches/rows of asperities on sterna, paired ventral prolegs, ventral abdominal gill tufts, special armature on the eighth tergum, and a respiratory chamber at the tip.

Further distinguishing features include a ninth abdominal segment shorter than the eighth (excluding appendages), tergum nine extending onto the ventral surface and forming paired urogomphi (tail-like appendages) that are fixed at the base, unsegmented, and dorsally or posterodorsally oriented. These urogomphi are separated by less than two basal widths and the ninth sternum is partially or entirely exposed. The abdominal tip lacks a hinged closing structure and the tenth segment lacks both oval lobes with a lengthwise groove. The eighth opening is functional and positioned sidewise or backward and to the side.

== Taxonomy ==
Perothops was put under the family Eucnemidae in 1993 by Jyrki Muona and demoted to the rank of genus, after being formerly considered a separate family. The genus contains three species, P. witticki, P. cervinus and P. muscidus. P. witticki was discovered by John Lawrence LeConte, P. muscidus was discovered by Johann Friedrich von Eschscholtz, and P. cervinus was discovered by Jean Théodore Lacordaire.

There are synonyms for P. muscidus and P. cervinus, P. muscida and P. cervina respectively.

== Etymology ==
The name of the genus of beetles is derived from Greek. The suffix, "thops", means "eye". The prefix, though, is harder to identify. It most likely is referring to "maimed/crippled" or "little necklaces/bands". This name may refer to the placement of the eyes on these beetles. The specimens in this genus are known as Beech-tree beetles. This is most likely due to Willis Blatchley finding adult specimens of P. muscidus on old beech trees.

== Differentiation ==
There are multiple factors to help differentiate the species of Perothops from each other. Perothops witticki is reddish-brown and its hairs are yellowish-gray. It has rounded sides but a sharp posterior angle. Perothops cervinus, on the other hand, has a divergent, acute, and long posterior angle. The two mentioned species are found in southern California.

To contrast, Perothops muscidus is widely distributed across the Eastern U.S.A. P. muscidus has a shorter posterior angle and shorter lateral lobes.

== Distribution, habitat and other information ==
P. muscidus is distributed across the Eastern United States, and the other 2 species in the genus are spread out across California. The species of the genus generally appear in forested areas. As of January 2024, their diet is unknown, along with their conservation status – no research is taking place. They appear from the middle of May into June. The subfamily this genus belongs to was described first by Jean Théodore Lacordaire in 1857. This genus was described by Johann Friedrich von Eschscholtz in 1836.

On June 16, 1969, over 3 days in Oakzanita Springs Park, southern California, hundreds of Perothops witticki were seen falling from a large oak tree. Observations, including this one, suggest that the aggregations of P. witticki may be yearly occurrences at specific locations. No flights occurred before or after the beetles fell from the tree, and no mating was observed. It was estimated that about 500 beetles dropped. Based on these observations, it seems from May to June adult P. witticki look for aggregation areas in places that are associated, somehow, with oak trees. As is typical of false click beetles, this genus bores across the grain.
