= Clypeorhagus =

Scientific classification
- Domain: Eukaryota
- Kingdom: Animalia
- Phylum: Arthropoda
- Class: Insecta
- Order: Coleoptera
- Suborder: Polyphaga
- Infraorder: Elateriformia
- Family: Eucnemidae
- Tribe: Dirhagini
- Genus: Clypeorhagus; Olexa, 1975

Genus of beetles

Clypeorhagus is a genus of beetles belonging to the family Eucnemidae.

The species of this genus are found in Europe and Asia.

== Species ==
There are at least two species:

- Clypeorhagus clypeatus (Hampe, 1850)
- Clypeorhagus elongatus (Fleutiaux, 1923)
