= Mesogenus =

Scientific classification
- Domain: Eukaryota
- Kingdom: Animalia
- Phylum: Arthropoda
- Class: Insecta
- Order: Coleoptera
- Suborder: Polyphaga
- Infraorder: Elateriformia
- Family: Eucnemidae
- Subfamily: Eucneminae
- Tribe: Mesogenini
- Genus: Mesogenus; Bonvouloir, 1871

Genus of beetles

Mesogenus is a genus of mostly Asian click beetle allies in the subfamily Eucneminae and typical of the tribe Mesogenini, erected by Viscount Henri de Bonvouloir in 1871.

== Species ==
1. Mesogenus austrocaledonicus (Perroud & Montrouzier, 1864) - New Caledonia
2. Mesogenus blumei Fleutiaux, 1896 - Australia
3. Mesogenus cavifrons - New Guinea
4. Mesogenus harmandi Fleutiaux, 1922 - Vietnam
5. Mesogenus laosianus Cobos, 1979 - Laos
6. Mesogenus sicardi Fleutiaux, 1926 - Madagascar
7. Mesogenus sumatrensis Fleutiaux, 1896 - Sumatra
