= Buckiella =

Scientific classification
- Domain: Eukaryota
- Kingdom: Animalia
- Phylum: Arthropoda
- Class: Insecta
- Order: Coleoptera
- Suborder: Polyphaga
- Infraorder: Elateriformia
- Family: Eucnemidae
- Subfamily: Melasinae
- Tribe: Dirhagini
- Genus: Buckiella; Cobos, 1964

Genus of beetles

Buckiella is a genus of South American click beetle allies in the subfamily Melasinae and tribe Dirhagini, erected by Cobos in 1964. It contains the single species Buckiella novissima Cobos, 1964.
