= Henri Achard de Bonvouloir =

French nobleman and entomologist

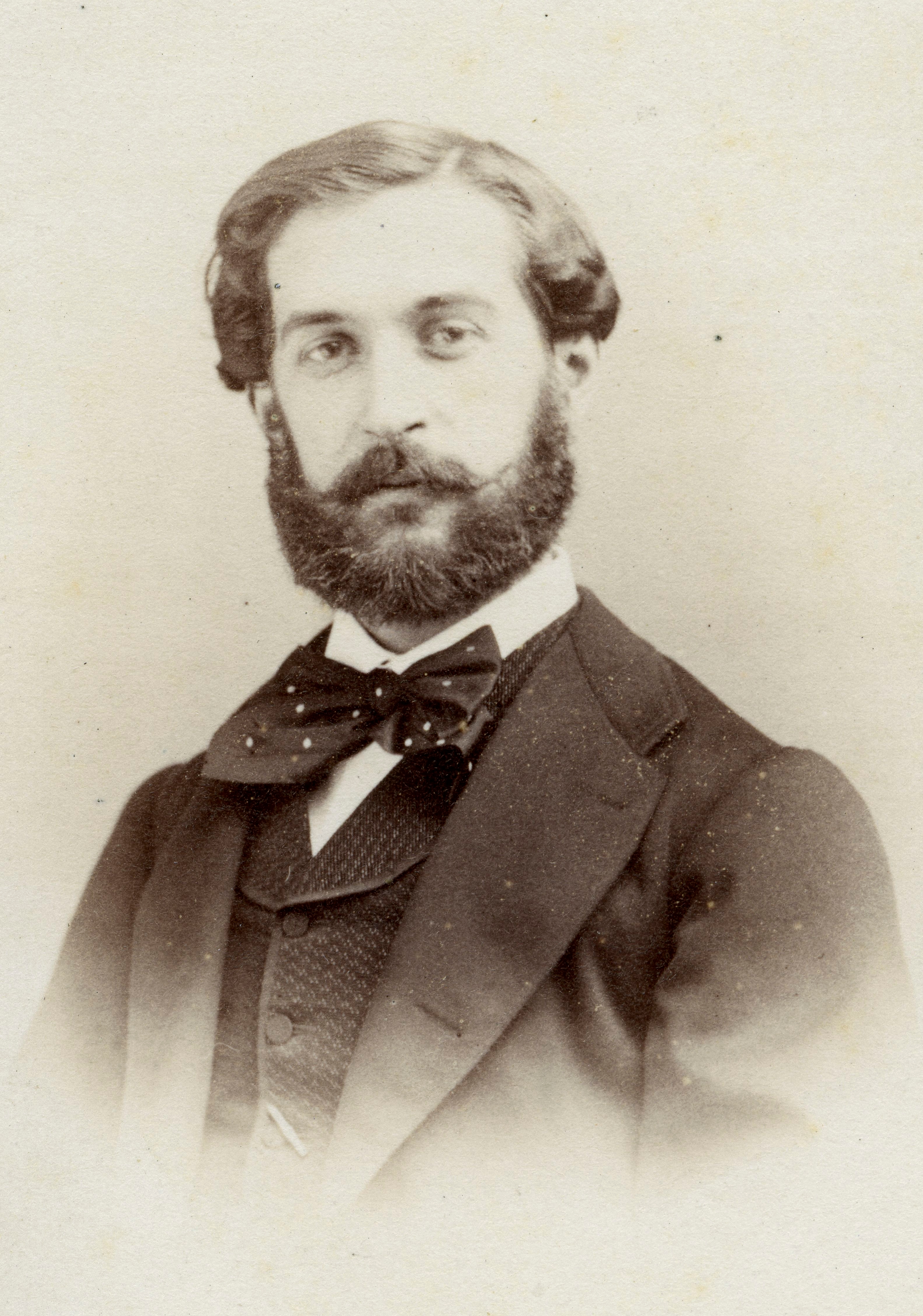

Victor Henri Achard de Bonvouloir (25 May 1839 - 13 July 1914) was a French nobleman and entomologist. He came from a noble family who owned Villa Bonvouloir in Bagnères-de-Bigorre which became the centre for many entomologists to meet in summers. A member of the French Entomological Society, he specialized in the Throscidae and the false click beetles, Eucnemidae. He also encouraged the study of cave beetles in the Pyrenees.

De Bonvouloir was born in Paris, the son of Comte Auguste Guy Joseph Achard de Bonvouloir (1811-1881) and Countess Charlotte de la Tour du Pin Achard (1819-1911). He became a member of the Entomological Society of France on 9 March 1859 and he became keenly involved in the study of beetles. He served as archivist and librarian for the society and was involved in changing the annals of the Society into a bi-monthly from what used to be a quarterly. He married Marie-Thérèse du Pin in 1871 and each summer their home Villa Bonvouloir in Bagnères-de-Bigorre was visited by entomologists from around Europe. They often went in search of cave beetles in the Pyrenees. Jules Linder (1830–1869) described several species of Anophthalmus (now placed in Aphaenops, Hydraphaenops and Geotrechus) from the region. He worked particularly on the family Throscidae with support from C. Jacquelin-Duval and worked on a monograph on the family Eucnemidae from 1871 to 1875 with plates by J. Migneaux.
