= Temnus =

Scientific classification
- Kingdom: Animalia
- Phylum: Arthropoda
- Class: Insecta
- Order: Coleoptera
- Suborder: Polyphaga
- Infraorder: Elateriformia
- Family: Eucnemidae
- Subfamily: Eucneminae
- Tribe: Mesogenini
- Genus: Temnus; Fleutiaux, 1920

Genus of beetles

Temnus is a genus of click beetles in the subfamily Eucneminae and tribe Mesogenini, erected by Edmond Fleutiaux in 1920.

== Species ==
1. Temnus alius (Fleutiaux, 1912)
2. Temnus differens (Fleutiaux, 1896)
3. Temnus sumatrensis (Fleutiaux, 1896)
