= Rhacopus =

Scientific classification
- Kingdom: Animalia
- Phylum: Arthropoda
- Clade: Pancrustacea
- Class: Insecta
- Order: Coleoptera
- Suborder: Polyphaga
- Infraorder: Elateriformia
- Family: Eucnemidae
- Tribe: Dirhagini
- Genus: Rhacopus; Hampe, 1855

Genus of beetles

Rhacopus is a genus of beetles belonging to the family Eucnemidae.

The species of this genus are found in Europe and Japan.

Species:

- Rhacopus olexai (Hisamatsu, 1963)
- Rhacopus sahlbergi (Mannerheim, 1823)
