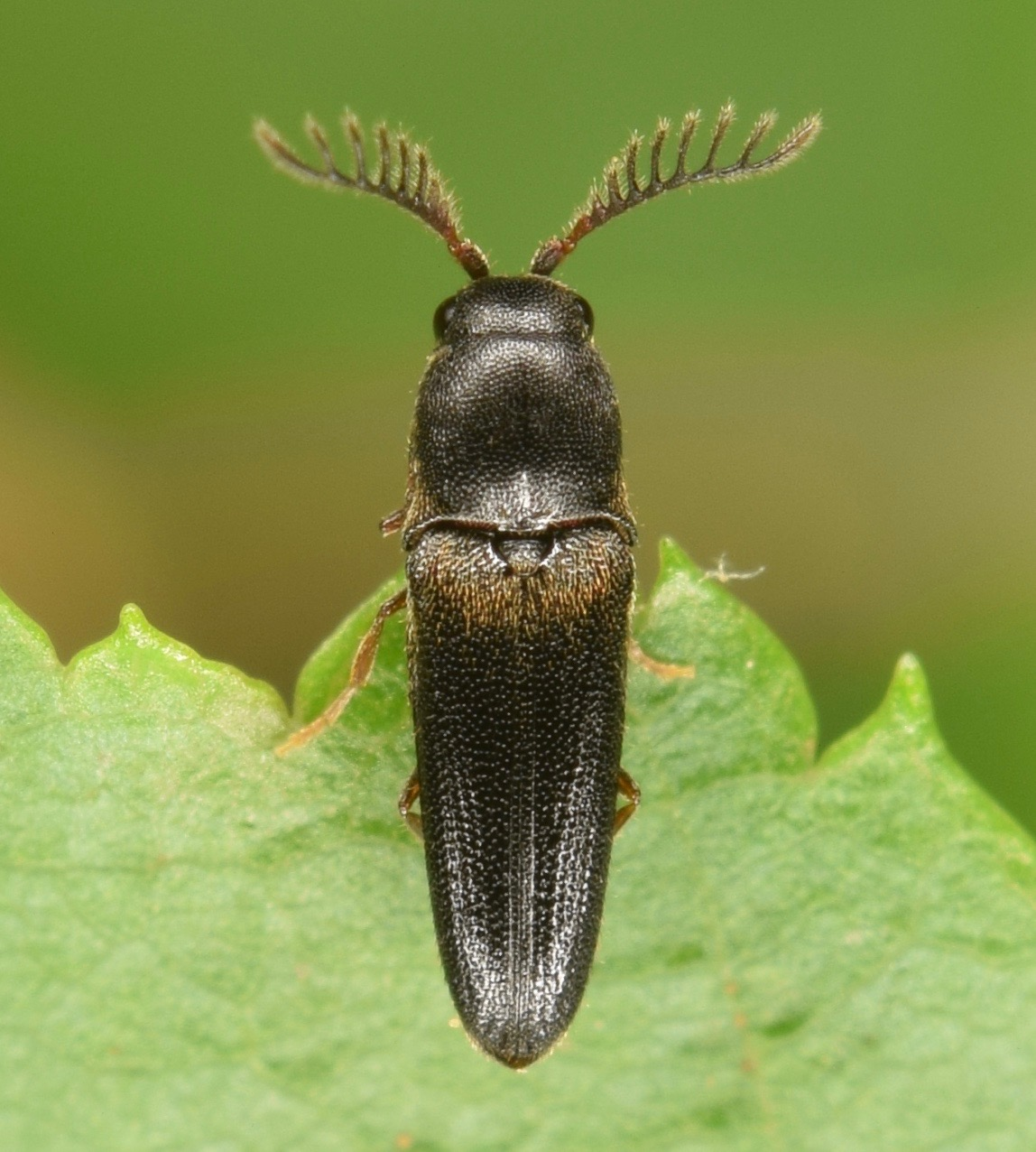
- Deltometopus amoenicornis (Macraulacini)

Scientific classification
- Kingdom: Animalia
- Phylum: Arthropoda
- Clade: Pancrustacea
- Class: Insecta
- Order: Coleoptera
- Suborder: Polyphaga
- Infraorder: Elateriformia
- Superfamily: Elateroidea
- Family: Eucnemidae
- Subfamily: Macraulacinae; Fleutiaux, 1922

= Macraulacinae =

Subfamily of beetles

The Macraulacinae are a subfamily of the Eucnemidae family, erected by Edmond Fleutiaux in 1918.

== Tribes and genera ==
Eight extant and one fossil tribes are included in BioLib.cz:

Anelastidini Muona, 1993

1. Anelastidius Jacquelin du Val, 1863

Echthrogasterini Cobos, 1965

1. Dictyeucnemis Lea, 1919
2. Echthrogaster Blackburn, 1900
3. Hemiopsida W.J. Macleay, 1872

Euryptychini Mamaev, 1976

1. Euryptychus LeConte, 1852

Jenibuntorini Muona, 1993

1. Jenibuntor Muona, 1993

=== Macraulacini ===
Authority: Fleutiaux, 1923

1. Absensiugum Otto, Muona & Córdoba-Alfaro, 2023
2. Asiocnemis Mamaev, 1976
3. Ceratus Bonvouloir, 1871
4. Chapianus Fleutiaux, 1921
5. Deltometopus Bonvouloir, 1871
6. Discaptothorax Blackburn, 1900
7. Dorsifornax Fleutiaux, 1926
8. Dromaeoloides Cobos, 1965
9. Dromaeolus Kiesenwetter, 1858
10. Fornax (beetle) Laporte da Castelnau, 1835
11. Galbodema Laporte de Castelnau, 1835
12. Heterotaxis Bonvouloir, 1875
13. Hodocerus Bonvouloir, 1871
14. Isarthrus LeConte, 1852
15. Lacus (beetle) Bonvouloir, 1871
16. Macroscython Fleutiaux, 1902
17. Maelodrus Fleutiaux, 1928
18. Melanoscython Fleutiaux, 1926
19. Onichodon Newman, 1838
20. Plesiofornax Coquerel, 1866
21. Procladidus Fleutiaux, 1921
22. Raapia Fleutiaux, 1898
23. Scython Laporte de Castelnau, 1835
24. Semnodema Bonvouloir, 1871
25. Serrifornax Fleutiaux, 1926
26. Spinifornax Fleutiaux, 1926
27. Thambus Bonvouloir, 1871
28. Xylofornax Otto, 2016

Nematodini Leiler, 1976

1. Coomanius Fleutiaux, 1924
2. Graciliforma Otto, 2016
3. Microtrigonius Bonvouloir, 1871
4. Miruantennus Otto, 2016
5. Nematodes (beetle) Berthold, 1827
6. Neomathion Fleutiaux, 1930
7. Trigonopleurus Bonvouloir, 1871

Oisocerini Muona, 1993

1. Oisocerus Bonvouloir, 1868

Orodotini Muona, 1993

1. Orodotes Bonvouloir, 1871

†Throscogeniini Yablokoff-Khnzorian, 1962

1. †Throscogenius Yablokov-Khnzoryan, 1962
