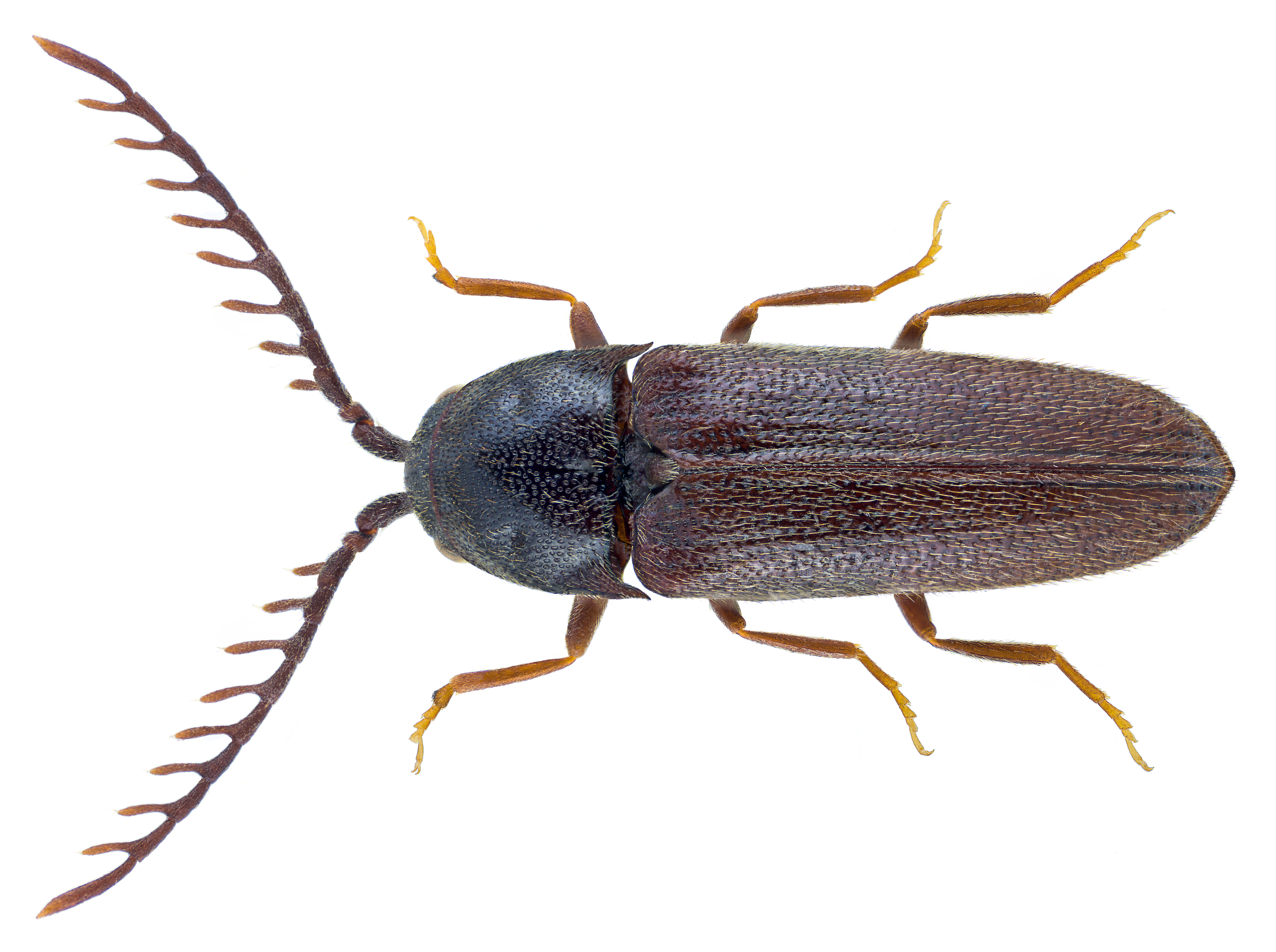
- Microrhagus pygmaeus

Scientific classification
- Kingdom: Animalia
- Phylum: Arthropoda
- Class: Insecta
- Order: Coleoptera
- Suborder: Polyphaga
- Infraorder: Elateriformia
- Family: Eucnemidae
- Tribe: Dirhagini
- Genus: Microrhagus; Dejean, 1833

= Microrhagus =

Genus of beetles

Microrhagus is a genus of beetles belonging to the family Eucnemidae.

The species of this genus are found in Europe, Japan and North America.

Species:

- Microrhagus audax Horn, 1886
- Microrhagus breviangularis Otto, 2015
