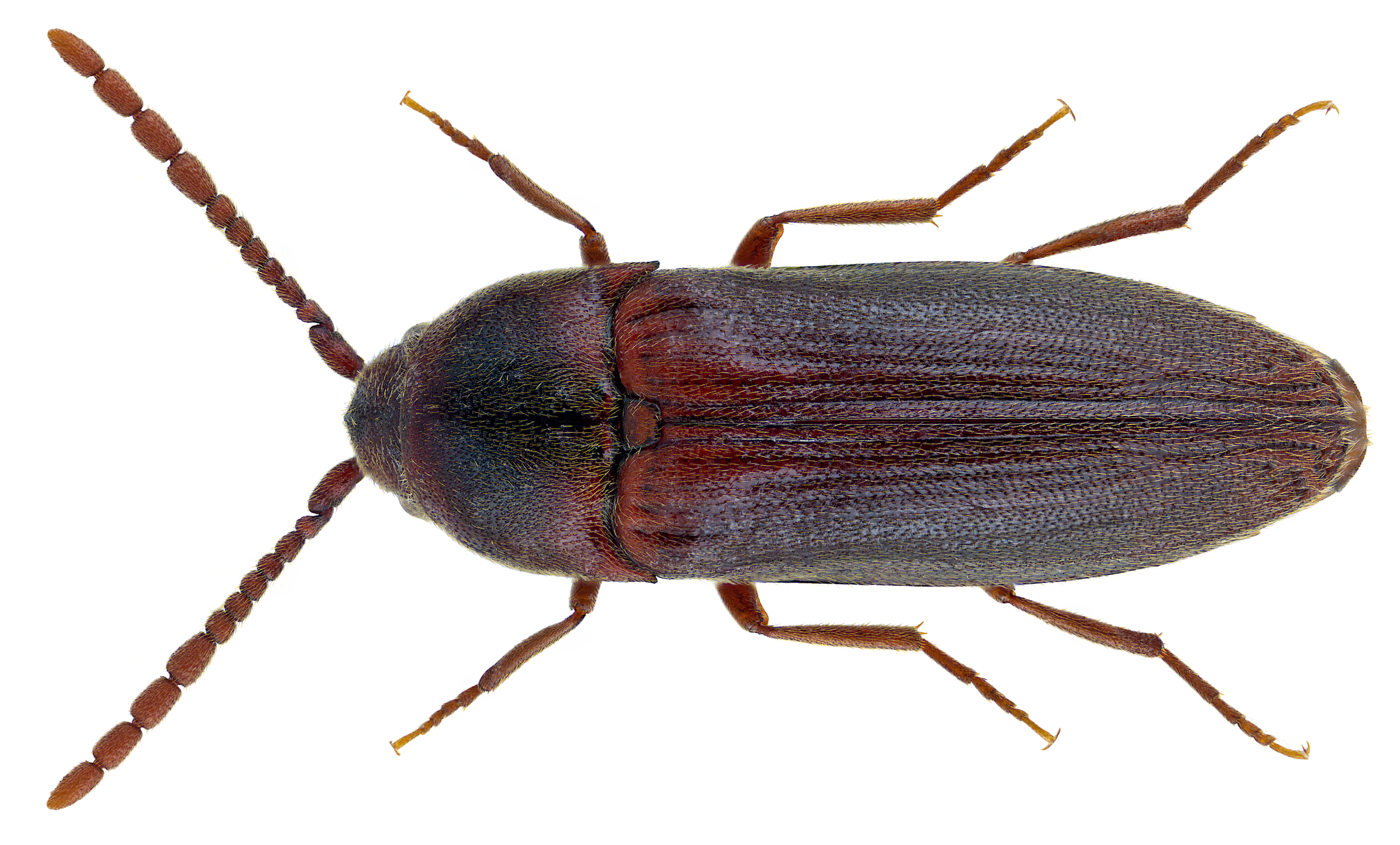
- Epiphanis cornutus

Scientific classification
- Kingdom: Animalia
- Phylum: Arthropoda
- Clade: Pancrustacea
- Class: Insecta
- Order: Coleoptera
- Suborder: Polyphaga
- Infraorder: Elateriformia
- Family: Eucnemidae
- Subfamily: Melasinae; Fleming, 1821

= Melasinae =

Subfamily of beetles

Melasinae is a subfamily of false click beetles in the family Eucnemidae.

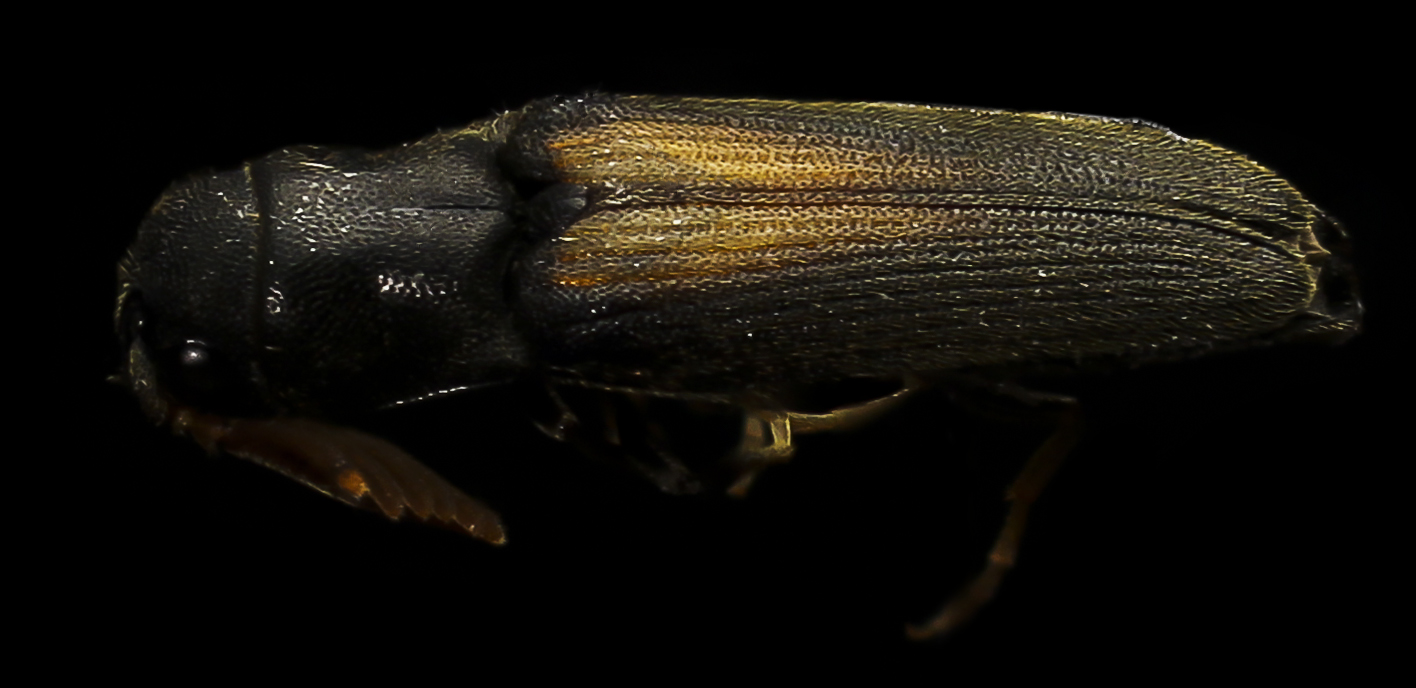
Isorhipis obliqua

== Tribes and Genera ==
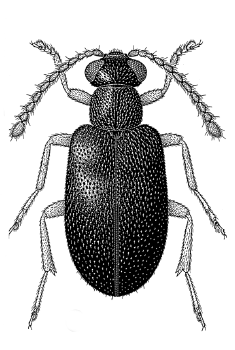
Xylophilus sp.

BioLib includes eight tribes:

Calyptocerini Muona, 1993

1. Calyptocerus Guérin-Ménéville, 1843
2. Otho (beetle) Lacordaire, 1857

Ceballosmelasini Muona, 1993

1. Ceballosmelasis Cobos, 1965

=== Dirhagini ===
Authority: Reitter, 1911

1. Adelorhagus Horn, 1890
2. Adelothyreus Chevrolat, 1868
3. Arganus de Bonvouloir, 1871
4. Arrhipis Gemminger, 1869
5. Balistica Motschoulsky, 1861
6. Buckiella Cobos, 1964
7. Cafolus de Bonvouloir, 1875
8. Clypeorhagus Olexa, 1975
9. Dirrhagofarsus Fleutiaux, 1935^{g b}
10. Entomophthalmus Bonvouloir, 1871^{g b}
11. Farsus Jacquelin de Val, 1863
12. Freyiola Cobos, 1964
13. Fryanus Fleutiaux, 1902
14. Golbachia Cobos, 1955^{b}
15. Haywardius Cobos, 1958
16. Melocarvalhosia Cobos, 1957
17. Microrhagus Dejean, 1833^{g b}
18. Porraulacus Fleutiaux, 1896
19. Prodirhagus Fleutiaux, 1925
20. Protofarsus Muona, 2000
21. Quirsfeldia Cobos, 1965
22. Rhacopus Hampe, 1855
23. Rhagomicrus Fleutiaux, 1902
24. Sarfus Fleutiaux, 1925
25. Sarpedon (beetle) Bonvouloir, 1871^{g b}
26. Talerax Sharp, 1877
27. Weyrauchiella Cobos, 1972

=== Epiphanini ===
Authority: Muona, 1993

1. Epiphanis Eschscholtz, 1829^{i c g b}
2. Hylis Des Gozis, 1886^{g b}

Hylocharini Jacquelin du Val, 1859

1. Hylochares Latreille, 1834^{g b}

=== Melasini ===
Authority: Leach, 1817

1. Compsocnemis de Bonvouloir, 1875
2. Isorhipis Boisduval & Lacordaire, 1835^{g b}
3. Melasis Olivier, 1790^{g b}

Neocharini Muona, 1993

1. Neocharis Sharp, 1877

Xylobiini Reitter, 1911

1. Agalba Broun, 1893
2. Basilewskydia Cobos, 1959
3. Bioxylus Fleutiaux, 1923
4. Cedraderus Leschen & Gimmel, 2023
5. Paraxylophilus Cobos, 1965
6. Proxylobius Fleutiaux, 1900
7. Saproxylobius Leiler, 1990
8. Xylophilus Mannerheim, 1823^{i c g b}
9. Xylotho Lucht, 1990

Other data sources: i = ITIS, c = Catalogue of Life, g = GBIF, b = Bugguide.net
