= Xylophilus (beetle) =

Scientific classification
- Kingdom: Animalia
- Phylum: Arthropoda
- Class: Insecta
- Order: Coleoptera
- Suborder: Polyphaga
- Infraorder: Elateriformia
- Family: Eucnemidae
- Subfamily: Melasinae
- Genus: Xylophilus; Mannerheim 1823

Genus of beetles

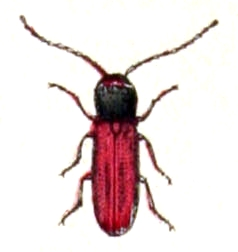
Xylophilus corticalis specimen

Xylophilus is a genus of beetles belonging to the family Eucnemidae.

Species:

- Xylophilus constrictus Fall 1901
- Xylophilus corticalis (Paykull 1800) Paykull 1800
- Xylophilus cylindriformis (Horn 1871)
- Xylophilus luniger (Champion 1916)
