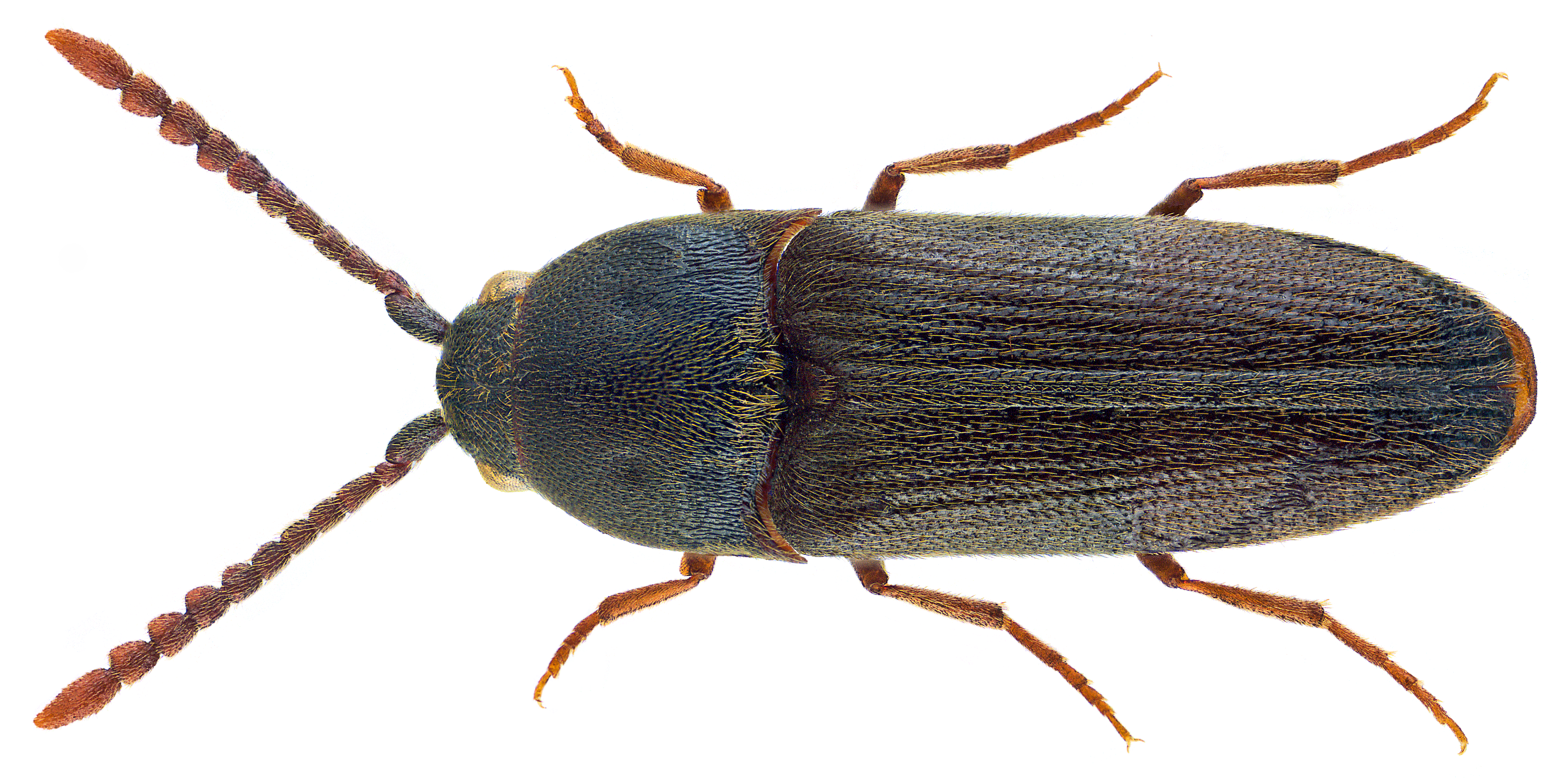
- Hylis olexai

Scientific classification
- Kingdom: Animalia
- Phylum: Arthropoda
- Class: Insecta
- Order: Coleoptera
- Suborder: Polyphaga
- Infraorder: Elateriformia
- Family: Eucnemidae
- Subfamily: Melasinae
- Tribe: Epiphanini
- Genus: Hylis; Gozis, 1886

Synonyms
- Elatocoelus Hyslop, 1921; Hylus Van Dyke, 1943; Hypocaelus Eschscholtz, 1836; Hypocaelus Guérin-Ménéville, 1843; Hypocoelus Guérin-Ménéville, 1843; Hypohylis Reitter, 1911

= Hylis =

Genus of beetles

Hylis is a genus of false click beetles belonging to the subfamily Melasinae and tribe Epiphanini, erected by Maurice des Gozis in 1866.

The species of this genus are found in Europe and Northern America.

== Species ==
The Global Biodiversity Information Facility lists:

1. Hylis cariniceps (Reitter, 1902)
2. Hylis foveicollis (Thomson, 1874)
3. Hylis frickae Muona, 1993
4. Hylis irvinei Muona, 2000
5. Hylis olexai (Palm, 1955)
6. Hylis procerulus (Mannerheim, 1823)
7. Hylis simonae (Olexa, 1970)
8. Hylis slipinskii Burakowski & Buchholz, 1991
9. Hylis terminalis (LeConte, 1866)
