= Myall =

Myalls are any of a group of closely related and very similar species of Acacia:

- Acacia binervia, commonly known as coast myall;
- A. papyrocarpa, commonly known as western myall;
  - a weeping form of the species, commonly known as water myall;
- A. pendula, commonly known as weeping myall, true myall, or myall;
- A. sibilans, commonly known as northern myall.

Note: Myall Muona, 1993 is a beetle genus in the subfamily Eucneminae.
