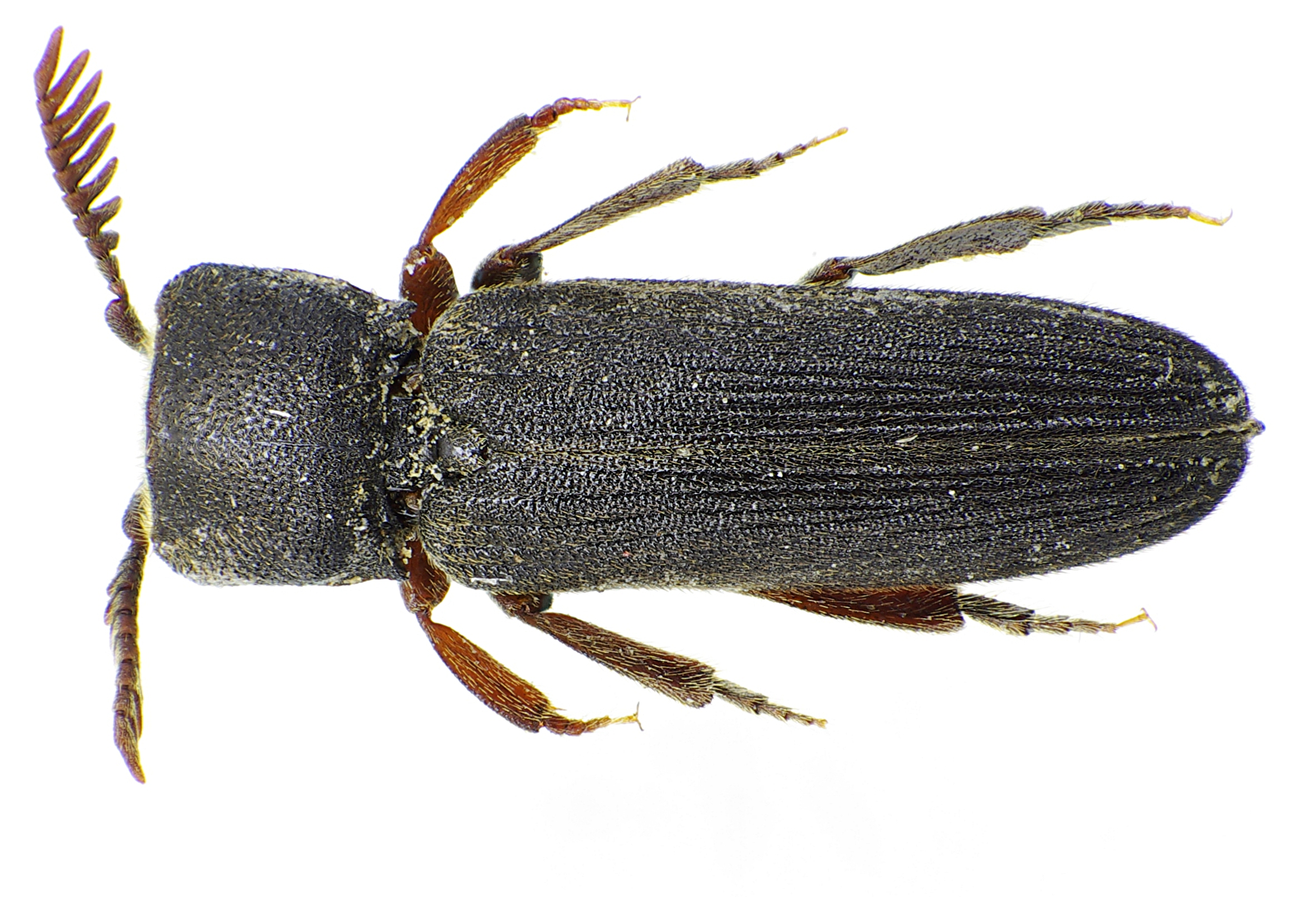
- Melasis bupestroides

Scientific classification
- Domain: Eukaryota
- Kingdom: Animalia
- Phylum: Arthropoda
- Class: Insecta
- Order: Coleoptera
- Suborder: Polyphaga
- Infraorder: Elateriformia
- Family: Eucnemidae
- Subfamily: Melasinae
- Tribe: Melasini
- Genus: Melasis; Olivier (1790)

Species
- see text

= Melasis =

Genus of beetles

Melasis is the type genus of false click beetles of subfamily Melasinae and tribe Melasini. It contains fourteen species, native to North America and parts of Europe, four of which can be found in the Nearctic realm.

== Description ==
The species in the genus are approximately 4.0-13.0 mm long. They can be identified by their flat tibiae, lack of antennal grooves on the prothorax, and the pectinate antennae of male specimens.

== Species ==
- M. brinchangi
- M. pectinicornis Melsheimer
- M. buprestoides L.
- M. fermini Sanchez-Ruiz & de la Rosa
- M. japonica Hisamatsu
- M. rufipalis Chevrolat
- M. rufipennis Horn
- M. shikokensis Hisamatsu
- M. sinensis Lucht.
- M. tibialis Lucht.
- M. tsugae Hopping

== Distribution and habitat ==
The species are found across North America, and more densely in Europe. One species is found only in the southwestern United States, two others only on the Western Coast, and another is more widespread in the region, being found across southern Canada and the Eastern United States. Only M. bupestroides is widespread in Europe, but M. fermini can also be found in Spain.

The species are largely found in forested areas in late April through July. Their larvae usually feed on conifers like firs, and usually develop in hard wood.
