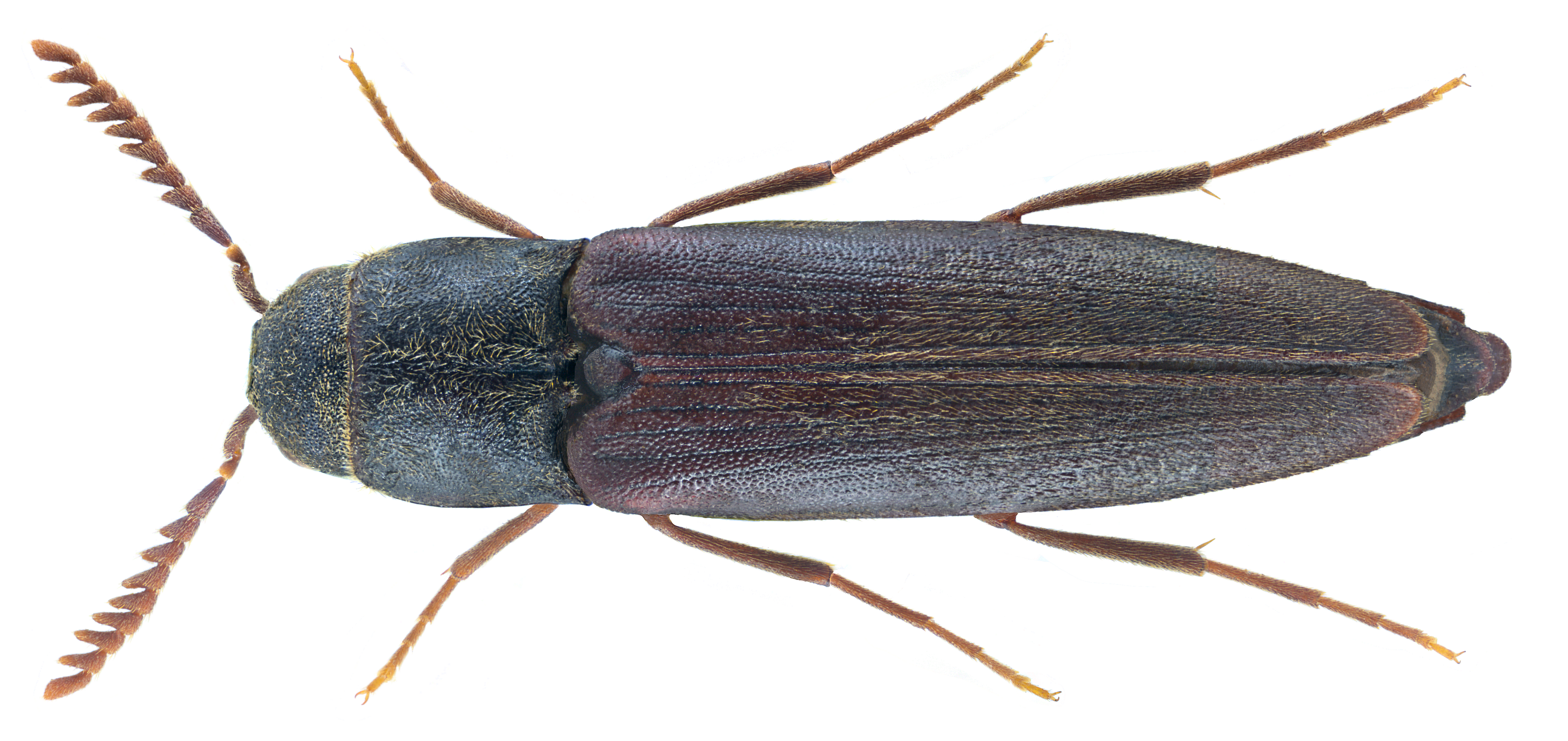

Scientific classification
- Kingdom: Animalia
- Phylum: Arthropoda
- Class: Insecta
- Order: Coleoptera
- Suborder: Polyphaga
- Infraorder: Elateriformia
- Family: Eucnemidae
- Subfamily: Melasinae
- Genus: Isorhipis; Boisduval & Lacordaire, 1835

Synonyms
- Isoriphis

= Isorhipis =

Genus of beetles

Isorhipis is a genus of beetles belonging to the family Eucnemidae.

The species of this genus are found in Europe, Japan and North America.

Species:

- Isorhipis bicolor Otto, 2024
- Isorhipis foveata Hisamatsu, 1955
- Isorhipis marmottani Bonvouloir, 1871
- Isorhipis nubila (Bonvouloir, 1871)
- Isorhipis obliqua (Say, 1836)
- Isorhipis occidentalis Muona, 2000
