= Hylochares =

Scientific classification
- Kingdom: Animalia
- Phylum: Arthropoda
- Class: Insecta
- Order: Coleoptera
- Suborder: Polyphaga
- Infraorder: Elateriformia
- Family: Eucnemidae
- Genus: Hylochares; Latreille, 1834

Genus of beetles

Hylochares is a genus of beetles belonging to the family Eucnemidae.

Species:

- Hylochares cruentatus (Gyllenhal, 1808) – funnet i Finland
- Hylochares harmandi Fleutiaux, 1900
- Hylochares nigricornis (Say, 1823)
- Hylochares populi Brüstle & Muona, 2009
