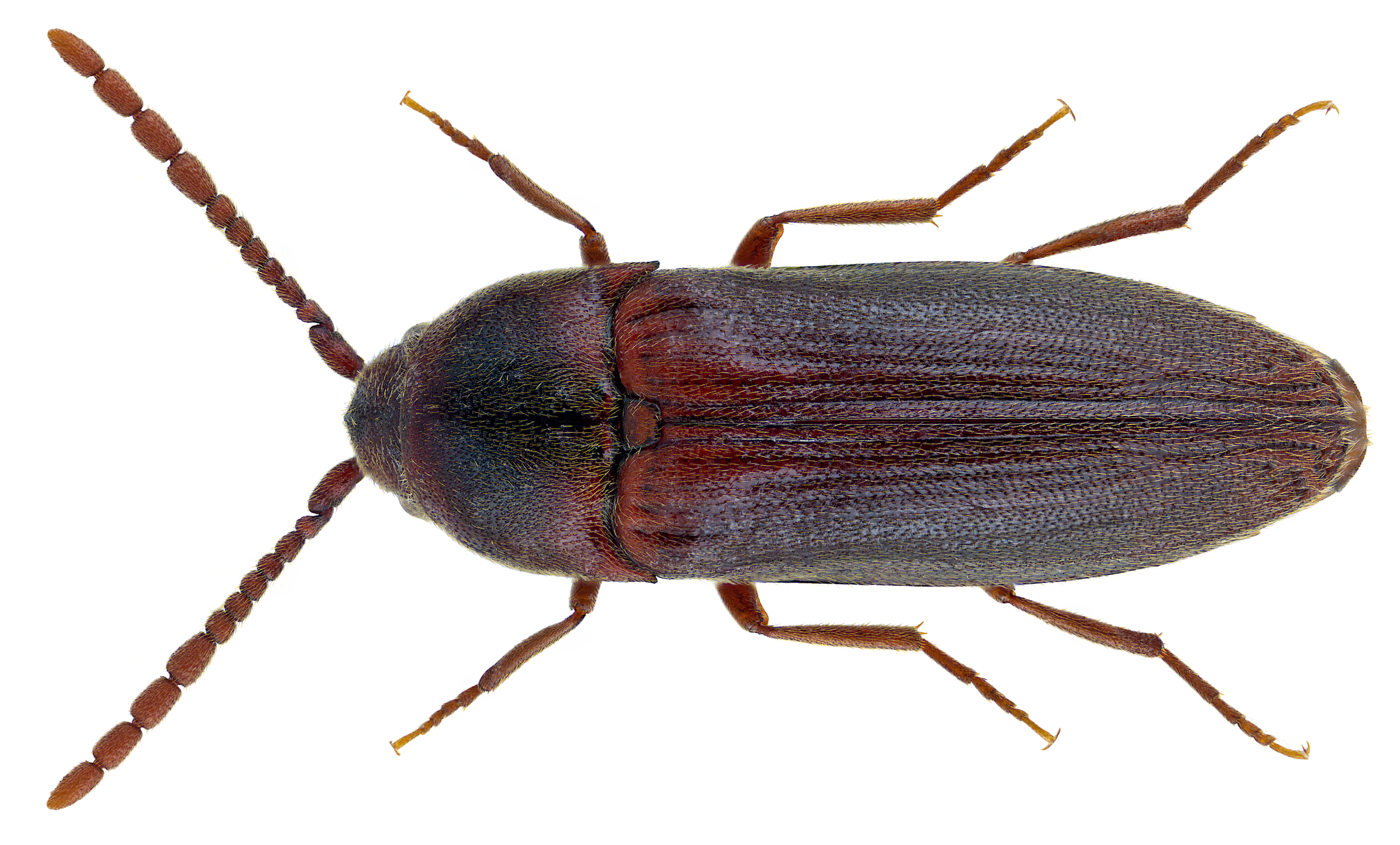
- Epiphanis cornutus

Scientific classification
- Domain: Eukaryota
- Kingdom: Animalia
- Phylum: Arthropoda
- Class: Insecta
- Order: Coleoptera
- Suborder: Polyphaga
- Infraorder: Elateriformia
- Family: Eucnemidae
- Tribe: Epiphanini
- Genus: Epiphanis; Eschscholtz, 1829

= Epiphanis =

Genus of beetles

Epiphanis is a genus of false click beetles in the family Eucnemidae, and typical of the tribe Epiphanini, erected by Johann Friedrich von Eschscholtz in 1829.

== Species ==
The Global Biodiversity Information Facility includes:

1. Epiphanis burmensis Muona, 2020
2. Epiphanis cornutus Eschscholtz, 1829 - Europe (including the British Isles) and N. America
3. †Epiphanis deletus Scudder, 1876
4. Epiphanis tristis (Sharp, 1908)^{i c g} - North America

Data sources: i = ITIS, c = Catalogue of Life, g = GBIF, b = Bugguide.net
