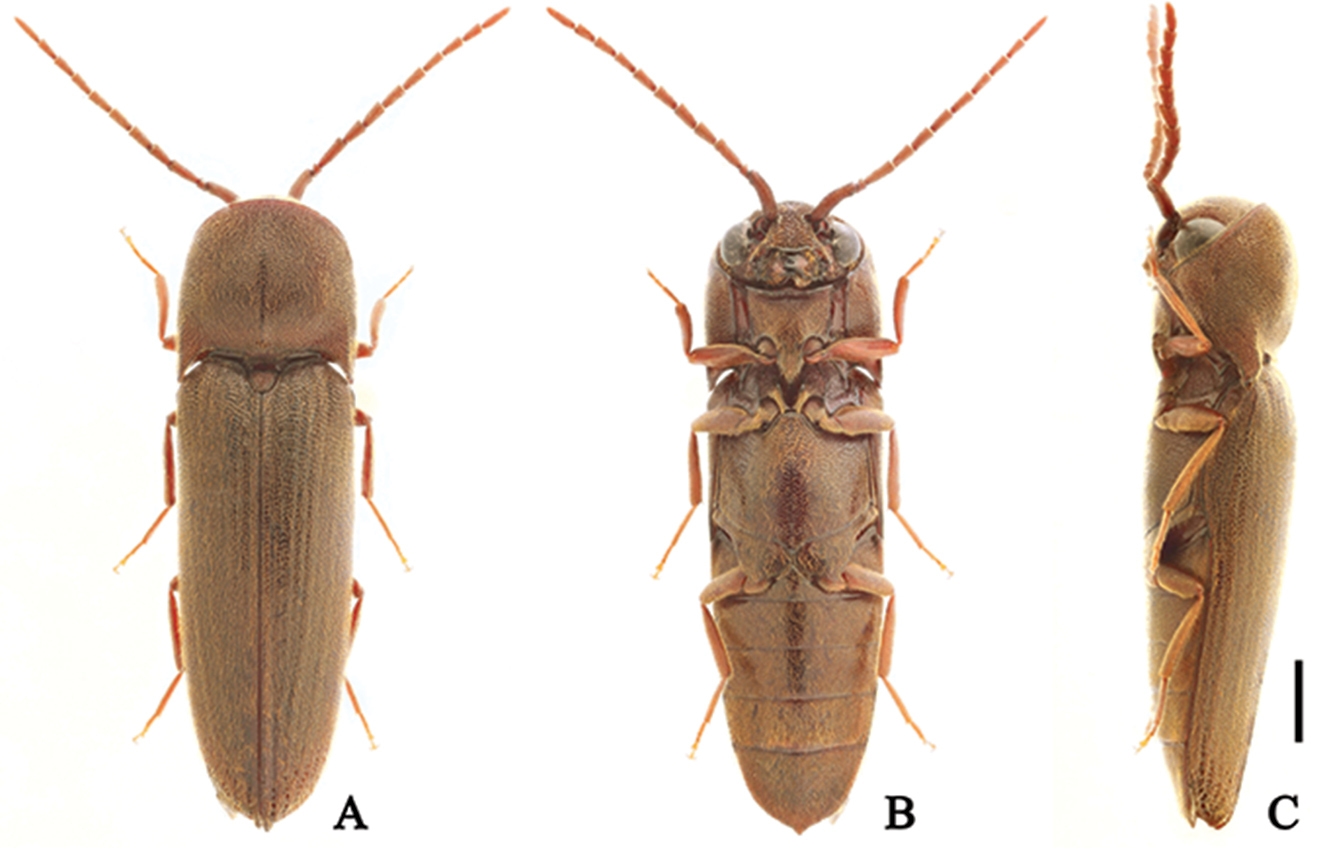
- Dirrhagofarsus lewisi

Scientific classification
- Kingdom: Animalia
- Phylum: Arthropoda
- Clade: Pancrustacea
- Class: Insecta
- Order: Coleoptera
- Suborder: Polyphaga
- Infraorder: Elateriformia
- Superfamily: Elateroidea
- Family: Eucnemidae; Eschscholtz, 1829

Subfamilies
- Anischiinae Fleutiaux, 1936; Eucneminae Eschscholtz, 1829; Macraulacinae Fleutiaux, 1922; Melasinae Leach, 1817; Palaeoxeninae Muona, 1993; Perothopinae Lacordaire, 1857 – perothopid beetles; Phlegoninae Muona, 1993; Phyllocerinae Reitter, 1905; Pseudomeninae Muona, 1993

Synonyms
- Anischiidae Fleutiaux, 1936; Phylloceridae Reitter, 1905; Melasidae Leach, 1817; Perothopidae Lacordaire, 1857

= Eucnemidae =

Eucnemidae Temporal range: Tithonian–Recent

Family of beetles

Eucnemidae, or false click beetles, are a family of elateroid beetles based on the type genus Eucnemis; they include about 1700 species, distributed worldwide.

== Description ==
Closely related to the family Elateridae, specimens of Eucnemidae can reach a length of 2–30 mm (0.079–1.181 in). Bodies are slightly flattened and convex. The upper surfaces of the body usually has hairs, setae or scales.

== Ecology ==
The larvae are typically legless, and generally develop feeding on the fluids of rotting wood, likely vomiting digestive enzymes into the wood to break apart the fungal hyphae, moving using their shovel shaped heads to force apart the wood. Adults, which are typically found on broken surfaces of trunks and stumps, have a short lifespan and it is unclear whether they feed, though they are capable fliers, and like some other elateroids are capable of clicking.

== Taxonomy ==
=== Extant Genera ===
The Global Biodiversity Information Facility includes:

1. Acedax de Bonvouloir, 1875
2. Achaica Muona, 1991
3. Adelorhagus Horn, 1890
4. Adelothyreus Chevrolat, 1868
5. Adelothyreus Horn, 1890
6. Agalba Broun, 1893
7. Agastocerus de Bonvouloir, 1871
8. Anabolodes Strand, 1928
9. Anelastes Kirby, 1818
10. Anelastidius Jacquelin du Val, 1860
11. Anischia Fleutiaux, 1896
12. Arganus de Bonvouloir, 1871
13. Arhipis Bonvouloir, 1871
14. Arisus de Bonvouloir, 1871
15. Arrhipis Bonvouloir, 1871
16. Aruanus Fleutiaux, 1902
17. Asiocnemis Mamaev, 1976
18. Aubailius Fleutiaux, 1921
19. Balistica Motschulsky, 1861
20. Baryus Fleutiaux, 1921
21. Basilewskydia Cobos, 1959
22. Bermillus de Bonvouloir, 1871
23. Bioxylus Fleutiaux, 1923
24. Bonvouloiriella Otto & Kovalev, 2013
25. Bossionus Fleutiaux, 1922
26. Bothrion Fleutiaux, 1921
27. Buckia Cobos, 1956
28. Buckiella Cobos, 1964
29. Cafolus de Bonvouloir, 1875
30. Calyptocerus Guérin, 1843
31. Ceballosmelasis Cobos, 1965
32. Ceratogonys Perty, 1830
33. Ceratus Bonvouloir, 1871
34. Chapianus Fleutiaux, 1921
35. Chropoecilus Fleutiaux, 1902
36. Cladidus Fleutiaux, 1918
37. Cladoscython Fleutiaux, 1921
38. Cladus Bonvouloir, 1871
39. Clyeorhagus Olexa, 1975
40. Clypeorhagus Olexa, 1975
41. Cobosiantha Alonso-Zarazaga, 1998
42. Cobosidea Chassain, 2015
43. Compsocnemis de Bonvouloir, 1875
44. Coomanius Fleutiaux, 1924
45. Cretopityobius Otto, 2019
46. Cryptostoma (beetle) Latreille, 1829
47. Cupressicharis Muona, 2020
48. Curtocephalus Fleutiaux, 1912
49. Cylus Muona, 2020
50. Cyrtostethus de Bonvouloir, 1872
51. Deltometopus Bonvouloir, 1871
52. Dendrocharis Guérin-Méneville, 1843
53. Diacerus de Bonvouloir, 1871
54. Diapodius de Bonvouloir, 1875
55. Dictyeucnemis Lea, 1919
56. Diphytaxis Horn, 1890
57. Dirrhagofarsus Fleutiaux, 1935
58. Discaptothorax Blackburn, 1900
59. Dorsifornax Fleutiaux, 1926
60. Dromaeocnemis de Bonvouloir, 1872
61. Dromaeoloides Cobos, 1964
62. Dromaeolus Kiesenwetter, 1858
63. Dyscharachthis Blackburn, 1900
64. Dyscolotaxia Horn, 1890
65. Echthrogaster Blackburn, 1900
66. Entomophthalmus Bonvouloir, 1871
67. Entomosatopus de Bonvouloir, 1871
68. Epiphanis Eschscholtz, 1829
69. Epipleurus Fleutiaux, 1928
70. Erdaia Muona, 1993
71. Eucalodemas Bonvouloir, 1871
72. Eucalosoma Laporte, 1840
73. Eucnemis Ahrens, 1812
74. Eudorus (beetle) Laporte, 1835
75. Eurachis Horn, 1890
76. Euryaulacus Bonvouloir, 1871
77. Euryostus de Bonvouloir, 1871
78. Euryptychoides Muona, 2021
79. Euryptychus Leconte, 1852
80. Falsothambus Muona, 2020
81. Farsus Jacquelin du Val, 1860
82. Feaia Fleutiaux, 1896
83. Fiegelia Muona, 2020
84. Fleutimelasa Otto & Kovalev, 2013
85. Fornax Laporte, 1835
86. Fornaxiella Cobos, 1965
87. Freudenia Cobos, 1965
88. Freyiola Cobos, 1965
89. Fryanus Fleutiaux, 1902
90. Gagatellus Fleutiaux, 1912
91. Galbimorpha Fleutiaux, 1920
92. Galbites Fleutiaux, 1918
93. Galbodema Laporte, 1835
94. Gastraulacus Guérin, 1843
95. Golbachia Cobos, 1955
96. Goudotus Fleutiaux, 1926
97. Haywardinia Cobos, 1965
98. Haywardius Cobos, 1958
99. Hemiopsida MacLeay, 1873
100. Henecocrus Bonvouloir, 1871
101. Henecosoma Horn, 1890
102. Heterotaxis de Bonvouloir, 1875
103. Hodocerus de Bonvouloir, 1872
104. Hylis Gozis, 1886
105. Hylochares Latreille, 1834
106. Hylotastella Fisher, 1945
107. Hylotastes de Bonvouloir, 1875
108. Hyperpalpus Lucht, 1990
109. Hypocoelus Latreille, 1834
110. Hyporrhagus Reitter, 1921
111. Idiotarsus Bonvouloir, 1871
112. Insulanus Fleutiaux, 1930
113. Isarthrus LeConte, 1852
114. Isoriphis Boisduval & Lacordaire, 1835
115. Jenibuntor Muona, 1993
116. Lacus (beetle) Bonvouloir, 1871
117. Lamprotrichus Bonvouloir, 1871
118. Langurioscython Heller, 1917
119. Macraulacus de Bonvouloir, 1872
120. Macroscython Fleutiaux, 1902
121. Maelodrus Fleutiaux, 1928
122. Mahatsinjus Fleutiaux, 1926
123. Melanocoleus Bonvouloir, 1872
124. Melanoscython Fleutiaux, 1926
125. Melasis Olivier, 1790
126. Melocarvalhosia Cobos, 1957
127. Mesogenus Bonvouloir, 1871
128. Microrhagus Dejean, 1833
129. Microtrigonus Bonvouloir, 1871
130. Modius (beetle) Fleutiaux, 1918
131. Monrosina Cobos, 1958
132. Muonaja Özdikmen, 2008
133. Myall Muona, 1993
134. Namolius Bonvouloir, 1875
135. Nebulatorpidus Lucht, 1998
136. Nematodes (beetle) Berthold, 1827
137. Neocharis Sharp, 1877
138. Neocharoides Muona, 2021
139. Neodema Fleutiaux, 1921
140. Neodiaeretus Cobos, 1956
141. Neodiapodius Fisher, 1945
142. Neofornax Cobos, 1958
143. Neomathion Fleutiaux, 1930
144. Neusiokia Muona, 2022
145. Oisocerus Bonvouloir, 1868
146. Olbrechtsia Cobos, 1959
147. Onichodon Newman, 1838
148. Onya Muona, 1993
149. Orodotes Bonvouloir, 1875
150. Otho (beetle) Lacordaire, 1857
151. Pachyfornax Fleutiaux, 1902
152. Palaeoxenus Horn, 1891
153. Paleoeucnemis Muona, 2020
154. Paradema Cobos, 1986
155. Paraxylophilus Cobos, 1965
156. Pereirella Cobos, 1956
157. Perothops Eschscholtz, 1836
158. Perrotius Fleutiaux, 1938
159. Phaenobolus Horn, 1890
160. Phaenocerus Bonvouloir, 1871
161. Phanerochroeus Bonvouloir, 1871
162. Phlegon (beetle) Laporte de Castelnau, 1840
163. Phyllocerus Lepeletier & Serville, 1828
164. Piestocera Perty, 1830
165. Pinaroo Muona, 1993
166. Plesiofornax Bonvouloir, 1866
167. Plesiofornax Coquerel, 1866
168. Pocoelus Fleutiaux, 1926
169. Poecilochrus Bonvouloir, 1871
170. Porraulacus Fleutiaux, 1896
171. Potergites Britton, 1960
172. Procladidus Fleutiaux, 1921
173. Prodirhagus Fleutiaux, 1925
174. Profornax Fleutiaux, 1896
175. Prolycaon Fleutiaux, 1923
176. Prosassanus Fleutiaux, 1945
177. Protofarsus Muona, 2000
178. Protomicrorhagus Muona, 2020
179. Protovitellius Muona, 2020
180. Proutianus Muona, 1993
181. Proxylobius Fleutiaux, 1900
182. Pseudochapianus Lucht, 1987
183. Pseudodiaeretus Fleutiaux, 1902
184. Pseudomenes Fleutiaux, 1902
185. Pseudomyall Muona, 2020
186. Pseudorhacopus Olexa, 1975
187. Pseudoscython Fleutiaux, 1902
188. Pseudotemnillus Muona, 2021
189. Quirsfeldia Cobos, 1965
190. Raapia Fleutiaux, 1899
191. Rhacopus Hampe, 1855
192. Rhagomicrus Fleutiaux, 1902
193. Rheanischia Li, Chang & Muona, 2021
194. Sakalavus Fleutiaux, 1926
195. Saproxylobius Leiler, 1990
196. Sarfus Fleutiaux, 1925
197. Sarpedon (beetle) Bonvouloir, 1871
198. Sassanus Fleutiaux, 1925
199. Schizophilus Bonvouloir, 1871
200. Scopulifer Fleutiaux, 1896
201. Scython Laporte, 1835
202. Semnodema Bonvouloir, 1875
203. Serrifornax Fleutiaux, 1926
204. Sieglindea Muona, 1993
205. Silveriola Cobos, 1956
206. Similifornax Fleutiaux, 1926
207. Somahenecus Cobos, 1965
208. Spinifornax Fleutiaux, 1926
209. Stethon LeConte, 1866
210. Submesogenus Fleutiaux, 1921
211. Tacerus Fleutiaux, 1928
212. Tachycnemis Bonvouloir, 1872
213. Talerax Sharp, 1877
214. Temnillus Bonvouloir, 1871
215. Temnus Fleutiaux, 1920
216. Thambus Bonvouloir, 1871
217. Torigaia Hisamatsu & Sato, 1959
218. Trigonopleurus Bonvouloir, 1875
219. Vitellius (beetle) Bonvouloir, 1871
220. Weyrauchiella Cobos, 1972
221. Xylophilus (beetle) Mannerheim, 1823
222. Xylotho Lucht, 1990

Note misplaced names: Aulacosternus Motschoulsky, 1861

=== Fossil genera ===
- †Beattieellus Oberprieler et al. 2016 – Talbragar Fossil Bed, Australia, Late Jurassic (Tithonian)
- †Cenomana Otto, 2019 – Burmese amber, Myanmar, Late Cretaceous (Cenomanian)
- †Lissantauga Poinar 2013 – Dominican amber, Miocene
- †Muonabuntor Li, Tihelka & Cai, 2020 – Burmese amber, Myanmar, Cenomanian
