= List of Malthodes species =

This is a list of 126 species in the genus Malthodes.

== Malthodes species ==
- Malthodes abruptus Fender, 1951
- Malthodes aciculatus Fender, 1972
- Malthodes acuticauda Fender, 1951
- Malthodes adoxus Fender, 1951
- Malthodes albimontanus Fender, 1951
- Malthodes alexanderi Fender, 1949
- Malthodes analis LeConte, 1881
- Malthodes anatiformis Fender, 1951
- Malthodes angustifurca Fender, 1969
- Malthodes appendiculatus Fall, 1919
- Malthodes arcifer LeConte, 1881
- Malthodes arieticornus Fender, 1969
- Malthodes arizonensis Fender, 1951
- Malthodes atrocoeruleus Fender, 1951
- Malthodes bakeri Fender, 1951
- Malthodes barri Fender, 1951
- Malthodes basalis Fall, 1919
- Malthodes bicurvatus Fall, 1919
- Malthodes bifurcula Fender, 1951
- Malthodes bisinuatus Fender, 1951
- Malthodes bissellarum Fender, 1969
- Malthodes blackwelderi Fender, 1951
- Malthodes californicus Fender, 1951
- Malthodes canadensis Fender, 1951
- Malthodes canaliculatus Fender, 1951
- Malthodes captiosus LeConte, 1881
- Malthodes chapini Fender, 1951
- Malthodes chiricahuae Fender, 1951
- Malthodes columbiensis Fender, 1951
- Malthodes complexipygus Fender, 1951
- Malthodes complexus Fender, 1951
- Malthodes complicatus Fall, 1919
- Malthodes concavus (LeConte, 1851)
- Malthodes congruus LeConte, 1881
- Malthodes contortus Fender, 1951
- Malthodes cordicauda Fender, 1951
- Malthodes curvatus LeConte, 1881
- Malthodes diamondensis Fender, 1951
- Malthodes diegae Fender, 1951
- Malthodes dorothae Fender, 1951
- Malthodes downiei Fender, 1951
- Malthodes evanidus Fender, 1951
- Malthodes evexus Fender, 1951
- Malthodes exilis (Melsheimer, 1846)
- Malthodes eximius Fender, 1951
- Malthodes flexuosus Fender, 1951
- Malthodes forficatus Fender, 1951
- Malthodes fracidus Fender, 1951
- Malthodes fragilis (LeConte, 1851)
- Malthodes frisoni Fender, 1946
- Malthodes frosti Fender, 1943
- Malthodes fuliginosus LeConte, 1866
- Malthodes furcifer LeConte, 1881
- Malthodes fusculus (LeConte, 1851)
- Malthodes glyphidius Fender, 1951
- Malthodes greeni Fender, 1949
- Malthodes hatcheana Fender, 1951
- Malthodes humidus Fender, 1943
- Malthodes idahoensis Fender, 1951
- Malthodes immodestus Fender, 1969
- Malthodes insipidus Fender, 1951
- Malthodes intermedius Fender, 1951
- Malthodes intricatus Fender, 1951
- Malthodes knowltoni Fender, 1951
- Malthodes knulli Fender, 1951
- Malthodes lattini Fender, 1964
- Malthodes laurae Fender, 1968
- Malthodes lawrencei Fender, 1951
- Malthodes leechi Fender, 1951
- Malthodes ligulifer Bergroth, 1889
- Malthodes longipennis Fall, 1919
- Malthodes mackenziei Fender, 1951
- Malthodes macnabi Fender, 1946
- Malthodes magister Fall, 1919
- Malthodes margaritae Fender, 1951
- †Malthodes markpankowskii Pankowski & Fanti, 2022
- Malthodes medioccidens Fender, 1951
- Malthodes megapygus Fender, 1951
- Malthodes mitificus Fall, 1919
- Malthodes mollis Fall, 1919
- Malthodes neomexicanus Fender, 1972
- Malthodes niger (LeConte, 1851)
- Malthodes obductus Fall, 1919
- Malthodes oregonus Fender, 1943
- Malthodes orovillensis Fender, 1951
- Malthodes ovatus Fender, 1951
- Malthodes parvulus (LeConte, 1851)
- Malthodes piceolus Fall, 1919
- Malthodes pictithorax Fender, 1951
- Malthodes pictus Fender, 1951
- Malthodes piperi Fender, 1951
- Malthodes profusus Fender, 1951
- Malthodes provoensis Fender, 1951
- Malthodes quadricollis LeConte, 1881
- Malthodes ramsbyorum Fender, 1968
- Malthodes rectus LeConte, 1881
- Malthodes rhadinus Fender, 1963
- Malthodes robertae Fender, 1968
- Malthodes rotgeri Fender, 1946
- Malthodes sanbernadensis Fender, 1966
- Malthodes sandersoni Fender, 1951
- Malthodes selmaensis Fender, 1964
- Malthodes sericeiventris Fall, 1919
- Malthodes shenefelti Fender in Hatch, 1962
- Malthodes similis Fender, 1951
- Malthodes singularis Fender, 1951
- Malthodes sinuatus Fender, 1951
- Malthodes siskiyouensis Fender, 1964
- Malthodes spado LeConte, 1866
- Malthodes spinicauda Fender, 1951
- Malthodes stacesmithi Fender, 1954
- Malthodes stephani Fender, 1972
- Malthodes terraenovae Fender, 1964
- Malthodes thedae Fender, 1968
- Malthodes tribulus Fender, 1951
- Malthodes truncatus Fender, 1951
- Malthodes tularensis Fall, 1919
- Malthodes tumidicollis Fender, 1951
- Malthodes ute Fender, 1951
- Malthodes vanduzeeana Fender, 1951
- Malthodes vandykei Fender, 1951
- Malthodes vapidus Fall, 1919
- Malthodes vigilans Fall, 1919
- Malthodes visceratus Fall, 1919
- Malthodes werneri Fender, 1951
- Malthodes whittakeri Fender, 1951
- Malthodes williami Fender, 1968
