= Eurypogon harrisii =

Scientific classification
- Domain: Eukaryota
- Kingdom: Animalia
- Phylum: Arthropoda
- Class: Insecta
- Order: Coleoptera
- Suborder: Polyphaga
- Infraorder: Elateriformia
- Family: Artematopodidae
- Genus: Eurypogon
- Species: E. harrisii

Binomial name
- Eurypogon harrisii (Westwood, 1862)

Species of beetle

Eurypogon harrisii is a species of soft-bodied plant beetle in the family Artematopodidae. It is found in North America.
