= Aulonothroscus distans =

Scientific classification
- Domain: Eukaryota
- Kingdom: Animalia
- Phylum: Arthropoda
- Class: Insecta
- Order: Coleoptera
- Suborder: Polyphaga
- Infraorder: Elateriformia
- Family: Throscidae
- Genus: Aulonothroscus
- Species: A. distans

Binomial name
- Aulonothroscus distans Blanchard, 1917

Species of beetle

Aulonothroscus distans is a species of small false click beetle in the family Throscidae. It is found in North America.
