= Eurypogon californicus =

Scientific classification
- Domain: Eukaryota
- Kingdom: Animalia
- Phylum: Arthropoda
- Class: Insecta
- Order: Coleoptera
- Suborder: Polyphaga
- Infraorder: Elateriformia
- Family: Artematopodidae
- Genus: Eurypogon
- Species: E. californicus

Binomial name
- Eurypogon californicus Horn, 1880

Species of beetle

Eurypogon californicus is a species of soft-bodied plant beetle in the family Artematopodidae. It is found in North America.
