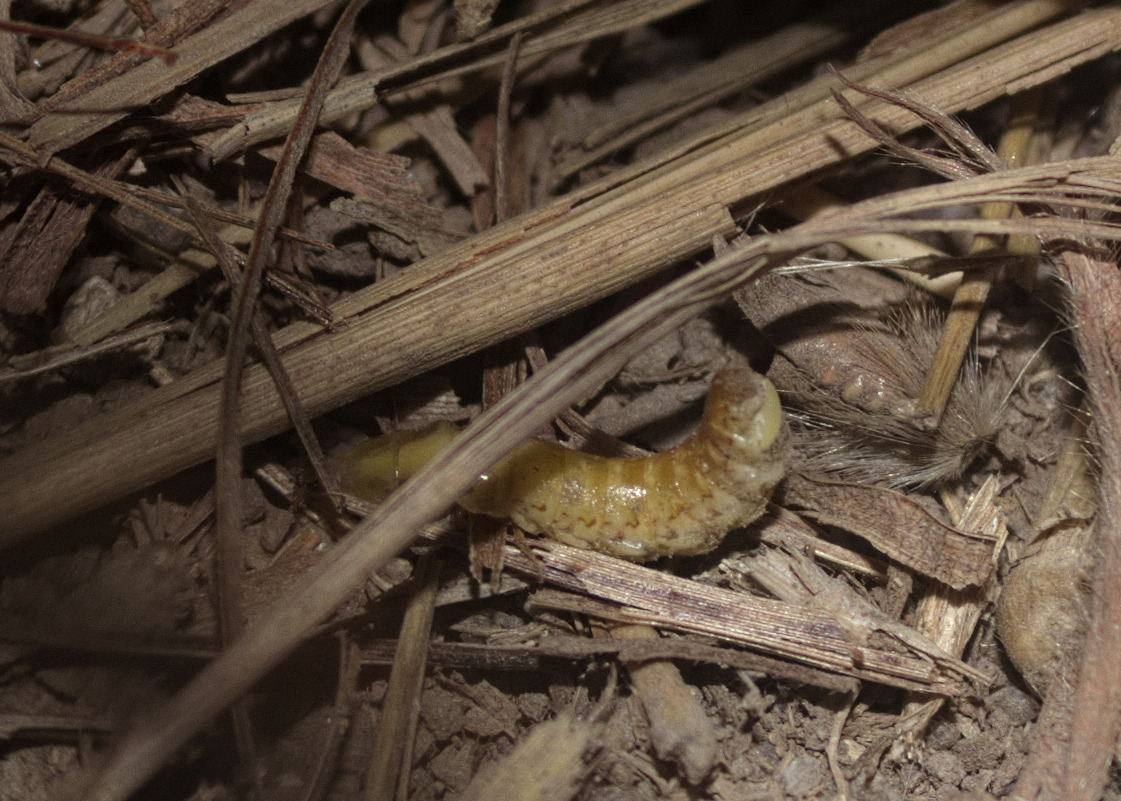
- Rhagophthalmus hiemalis

Scientific classification
- Kingdom: Animalia
- Phylum: Arthropoda
- Class: Insecta
- Order: Coleoptera
- Suborder: Polyphaga
- Infraorder: Elateriformia
- Superfamily: Elateroidea
- Family: Rhagophthalmidae
- Genus: Rhagophthalmus; Motschulsky, 1854

Synonyms
- Ochotyra Pascoe, 1862

= Rhagophthalmus =

Genus of beetles

Rhagophthalmus is the type genus of the Rhagophthalmidae: a family of Asian glow-worm beetles erected by Victor Motschulsky in 1854. Species have been recorded from India, China, Taiwan, Japan and Indochina.

== Species ==
The Global Biodiversity Information Facility lists:

1. Rhagophthalmus angulatus Wittmer, 1997
2. Rhagophthalmus beigansis Ho, 2012
3. Rhagophthalmus brevipennis Fairmaire, 1888
4. Rhagophthalmus burmensis Wittmer, 1994
5. Rhagophthalmus confusus E.Olivier, 1912
6. Rhagophthalmus elongatus Wittmer, 1994
7. Rhagophthalmus filiformis E.Olivier, 1912
8. Rhagophthalmus flavus Kawashima & Satô, 2001
9. Rhagophthalmus formosanus Kawashima & Sugaya, 2003
10. Rhagophthalmus fugongensis Li & Liang, 2008
11. Rhagophthalmus giallolateralus Ho, 2012
12. Rhagophthalmus gibbosulus Fairmaire, 1900
13. Rhagophthalmus giganteus Fairmaire, 1888
14. Rhagophthalmus hiemalis Yiu, 2017
15. Rhagophthalmus ingens (Fairmaire, 1896)
16. Rhagophthalmus jenniferae Kawashima & Satô, 2001
17. Rhagophthalmus kiangsuensis Wittmer, 1994
18. Rhagophthalmus laosensis Pic, 1917
19. Rhagophthalmus longipennis (Pic, 1923)
20. Rhagophthalmus lufengensis Li & Liang, 2008
21. Rhagophthalmus minutus Kawashima & Satô, 2001
22. Rhagophthalmus motschulskyi E.Olivier, 1912
23. Rhagophthalmus neoobscurus Wittmer & Ohba, 1994
24. Rhagophthalmus notaticollis Pic, 1916
25. Rhagophthalmus obscurus Pic, 1917
26. Rhagophthalmus ohbai Wittmer, 1994
27. Rhagophthalmus sausai Wittmer, 1997
28. Rhagophthalmus scutellatus Motschulsky, 1854
29. Rhagophthalmus semisulcatus Wittmer, 1997
30. Rhagophthalmus semiusta (Pascoe, 1862)
31. Rhagophthalmus sulcatus Pic, 1925
32. Rhagophthalmus sulcicollis E.Olivier, 1912
33. Rhagophthalmus sumatrensis E.Olivier, 1885
34. Rhagophthalmus tienmushanensis Wittmer, 1994
35. Rhagophthalmus tonkineus Fairmaire, 1888
36. Rhagophthalmus xanthogonus E.Olivier, 1912
