= Aulonothroscus validus =

Scientific classification
- Domain: Eukaryota
- Kingdom: Animalia
- Phylum: Arthropoda
- Class: Insecta
- Order: Coleoptera
- Suborder: Polyphaga
- Infraorder: Elateriformia
- Family: Throscidae
- Genus: Aulonothroscus
- Species: A. validus

Binomial name
- Aulonothroscus validus (LeConte, 1868)

Species of beetle

Aulonothroscus validus is a species of small false click beetle in the family Throscidae. Aulonothroscus validus is found in North America, specifically Canada and the United States. The species was discovered by Leconte in 1868. A. validus is around 2.5 to 5 mm long.
