= Macropogon testaceipennis =

Scientific classification
- Domain: Eukaryota
- Kingdom: Animalia
- Phylum: Arthropoda
- Class: Insecta
- Order: Coleoptera
- Suborder: Polyphaga
- Infraorder: Elateriformia
- Family: Artematopodidae
- Genus: Macropogon
- Species: M. testaceipennis

Binomial name
- Macropogon testaceipennis Motschulsky, 1859

Synonyms
- Macropogon rubricollis Pic, 1927

Species of beetle

Macropogon testaceipennis is a species of soft-bodied plant beetle in the family Artematopodidae. It is found in North America.
