= Trixagus mendax =

Scientific classification
- Domain: Eukaryota
- Kingdom: Animalia
- Phylum: Arthropoda
- Class: Insecta
- Order: Coleoptera
- Suborder: Polyphaga
- Infraorder: Elateriformia
- Family: Throscidae
- Genus: Trixagus
- Species: T. mendax

Binomial name
- Trixagus mendax (Horn, 1885)

Species of beetle

Trixagus mendax is a species of small false click beetle in the family Throscidae. It is found in North America.
