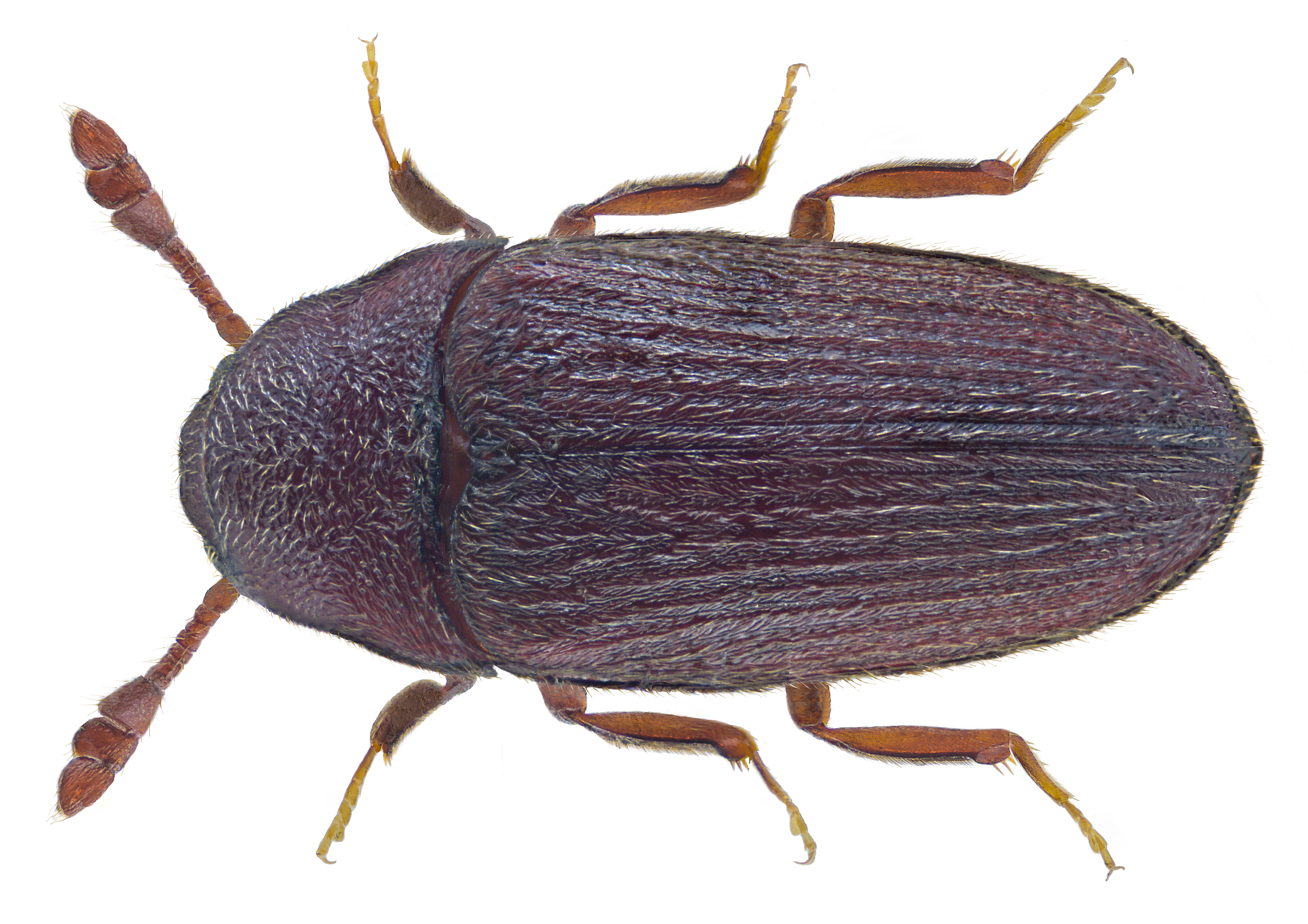
- Trixagus dermestoides 3.0 mm (2,8 to 3,3 mm)

Scientific classification
- Kingdom: Animalia
- Phylum: Arthropoda
- Class: Insecta
- Order: Coleoptera
- Suborder: Polyphaga
- Infraorder: Elateriformia
- Family: Throscidae
- Genus: Trixagus
- Species: T. dermestoides

Binomial name
- Trixagus dermestoides (Linnaeus, 1767)

= Trixagus dermestoides =

Species of beetle

Trixagus dermestoides is a species of false metallic wood-boring beetles native to Europe.
