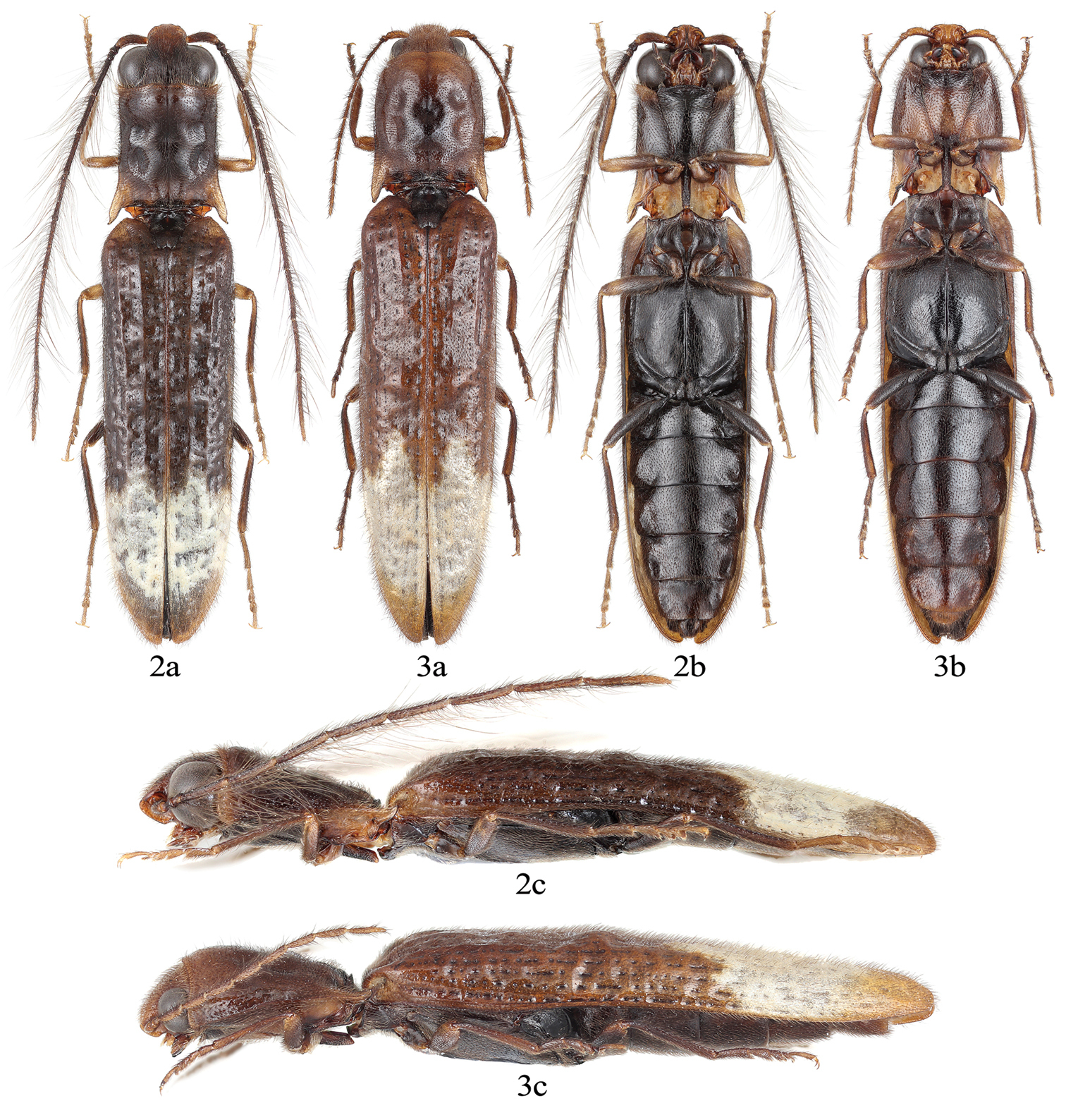
- Male (labelled "2") and female (labelled "3") specimens of Sinopyrophorus schimmeli

Scientific classification
- Domain: Eukaryota
- Kingdom: Animalia
- Phylum: Arthropoda
- Class: Insecta
- Order: Coleoptera
- Suborder: Polyphaga
- Infraorder: Elateriformia
- Superfamily: Elateroidea
- Family: Sinopyrophoridae; Bi & Li, 2019
- Genus: Sinopyrophorus; Bi & Li, 2019
- Species: S. schimmeli

Binomial name
- Sinopyrophorus schimmeli Bi & Li, 2019

= Sinopyrophorus =

Genus of click beetles

Sinopyrophorus is a genus of bioluminescent hard-bodied clicking beetles in the superfamily Elateroidea, and is the sole member of the recently recognized family Sinopyrophoridae. The genus currently contains a single species, Sinopyrophorus schimmeli, which was described in 2019 from the subtropical evergreen broadleaf forests of western Yunnan, China.

Sinopyrophorus was previously thought to represent the only bioluminescent click beetles (Elateridae) known from Asia, however, despite their similar "clicking" mechanism & light organ structure when compared to the true bioluminescent click beetles (e.g. Pyrophorini), phylogenomic analyses revealed they are phylogenetically outside the Elateridae proper, and therefore were elevated to their own independent family, the Sinopyrophoridae.

Sinopyrophorus is only distantly related to the hard bodied true bioluminescent click beetles, such as the Pyrophorini. Instead, Sinopyrophorus represents the earliest diverging member of the monophyletic clade of bioluminescent beetles known as the lampyroid beetles, which includes Sinopyrophoridae, Rhagophthalmidae, Phengodidae, and Lampyridae.
