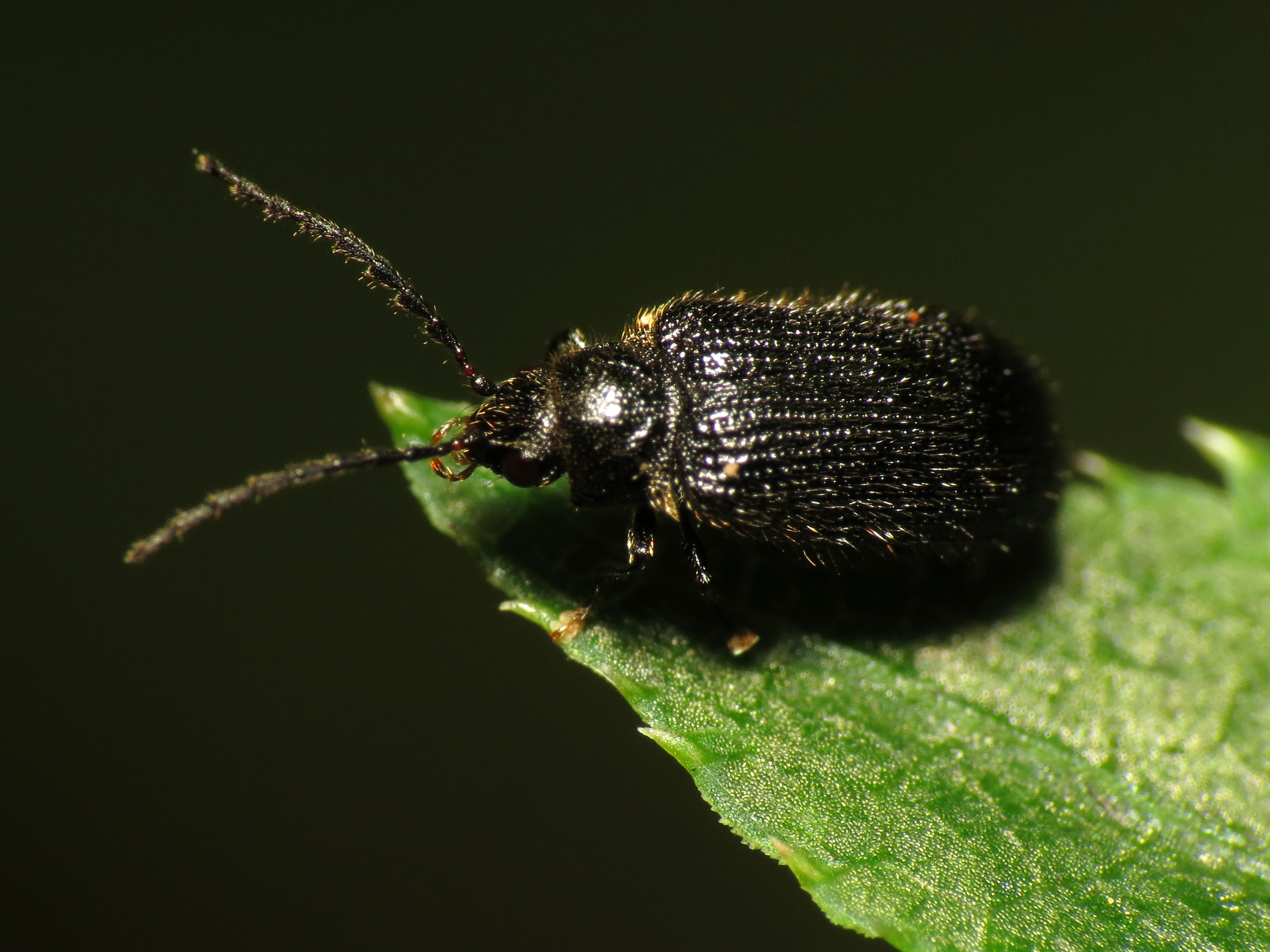

Scientific classification
- Domain: Eukaryota
- Kingdom: Animalia
- Phylum: Arthropoda
- Class: Insecta
- Order: Coleoptera
- Suborder: Polyphaga
- Infraorder: Elateriformia
- Family: Artematopodidae
- Genus: Eurypogon
- Species: E. niger

Binomial name
- Eurypogon niger (Melsheimer, 1846)

= Eurypogon niger =

Species of beetle

Eurypogon niger is a species of soft-bodied plant beetle in the family Artematopodidae. It is found in North America.

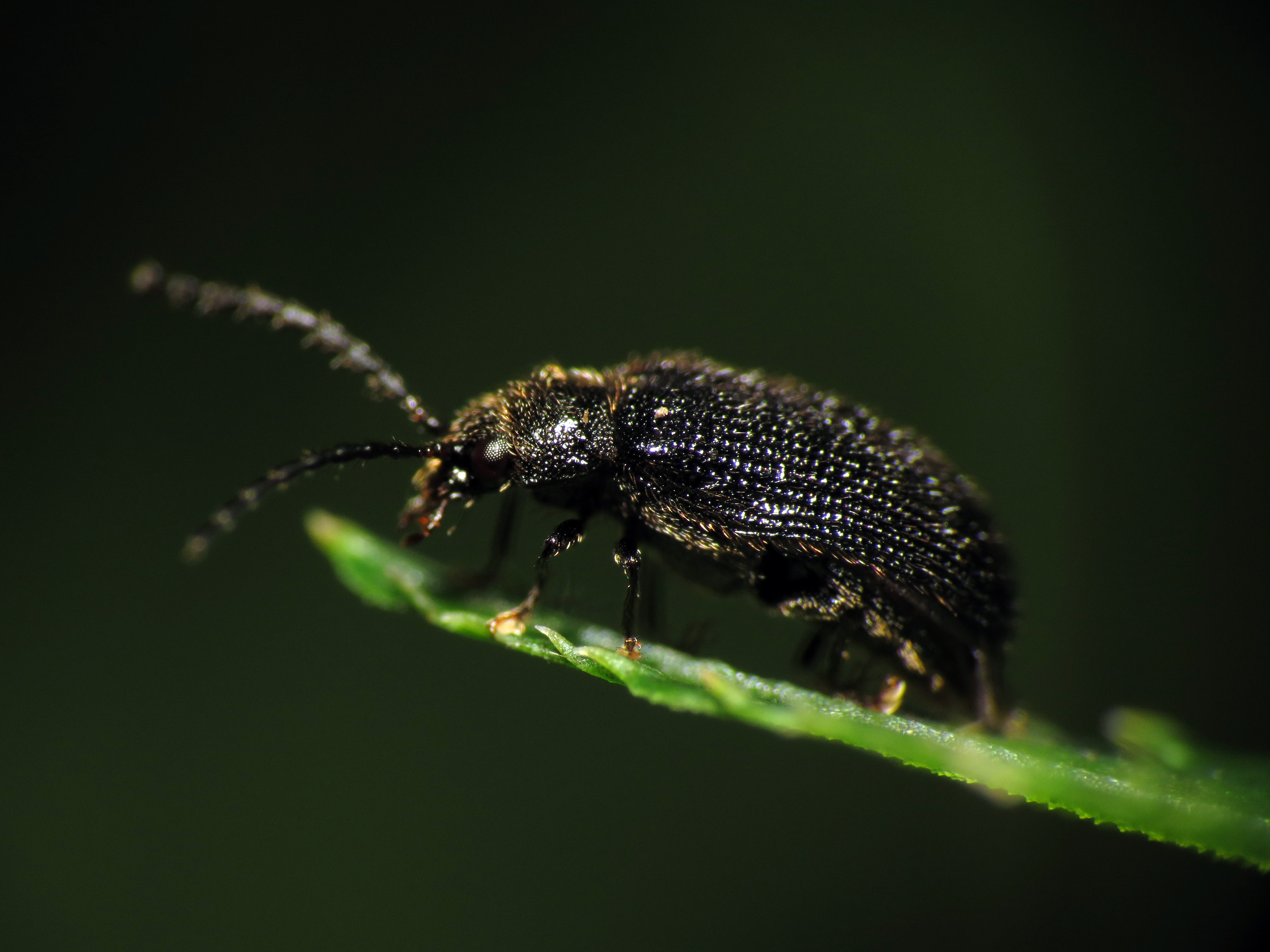
