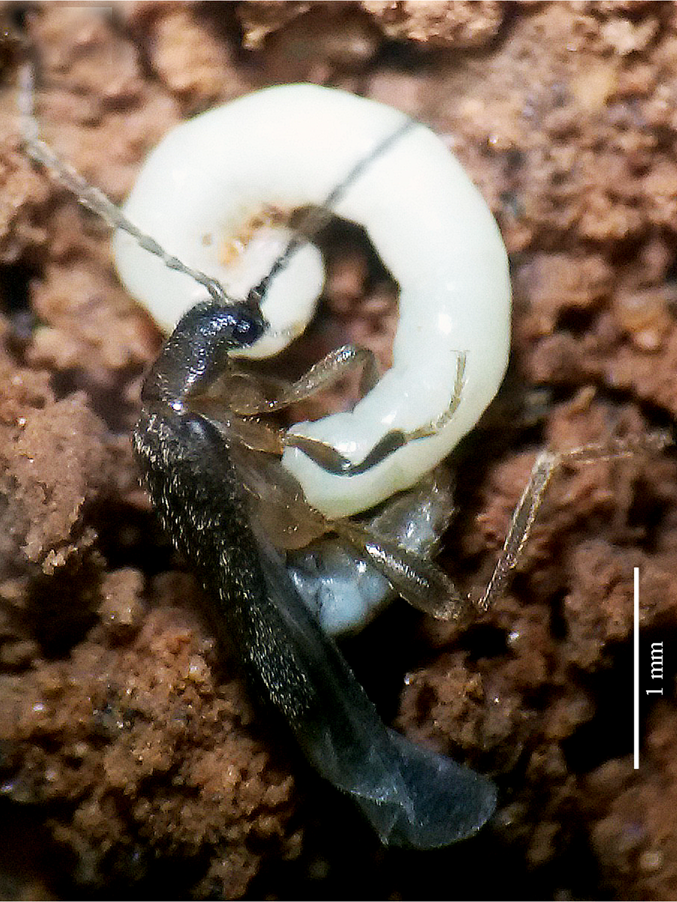
- Male Jurasai itajubense mating with a neotenic female which resembles their larval forms.

Scientific classification
- Kingdom: Animalia
- Phylum: Arthropoda
- Clade: Pancrustacea
- Class: Insecta
- Order: Coleoptera
- Suborder: Polyphaga
- Infraorder: Elateriformia
- Family: Jurasaidae
- Genus: Jurasai; Rosa, C. Costa, Kramp & Kundrata, 2020

Species
- 6 (See text)

= Jurasai =

Genus of beetles

Jurasai is a genus of elateroid beetles that belongs to the family Jurasaidae. Members of this genus can be found in South America within the Atlantic Rainforest and the Caatinga ecoregion of northeastern Brazil.

== Description ==
They have small body sizes that are weakly sclerotized making them soft. Members of this genus resemble soldier beetles (Cantharidae) and more specifically those of the subfamily Malthininae.

All known members of the family Jurasaidae have neotenic females that resemble their larval forms with only some parts of their head displaying adult features.

== Taxonomy ==
The genus Jurasai are beetles of the superfamily Elateroidea. Within the superfamily, they belong to the family Jurasaidae along with the genus Tujamita.

=== Species ===
The genus currently contains six described species. They are a cryptic species and there may be a large number of undescribed species. They are listed below:

- Jurasai digitusdei Rosa et al., 2020
- Jurasai itajubense Rosa et al., 2020
- Jurasai miraculum Biffi et al., 2021
- Jurasai parahybanum Nunes et al., 2023
- Jurasai vanini Biffi et al., 2021
- Jurasai ypauoca Roza, 2021
