= Macropogon sequoiae =

Scientific classification
- Domain: Eukaryota
- Kingdom: Animalia
- Phylum: Arthropoda
- Class: Insecta
- Order: Coleoptera
- Suborder: Polyphaga
- Infraorder: Elateriformia
- Family: Artematopodidae
- Genus: Macropogon
- Species: M. sequoiae

Binomial name
- Macropogon sequoiae Hopping, 1936

Species of beetle

Macropogon sequoiae is a species of soft-bodied plant beetle in the family Artematopodidae. It is found in North America.
