= Malthodes curvatus =

Scientific classification
- Kingdom: Animalia
- Phylum: Arthropoda
- Class: Insecta
- Order: Coleoptera
- Suborder: Polyphaga
- Infraorder: Elateriformia
- Family: Cantharidae
- Genus: Malthodes
- Species: M. curvatus

Binomial name
- Malthodes curvatus LeConte, 1881

Species of beetle

Malthodes curvatus is a species of soldier beetle in the family Cantharidae. It is found in North America.
