= Cerophytum convexicolle =

Scientific classification
- Domain: Eukaryota
- Kingdom: Animalia
- Phylum: Arthropoda
- Class: Insecta
- Order: Coleoptera
- Suborder: Polyphaga
- Infraorder: Elateriformia
- Family: Cerophytidae
- Genus: Cerophytum
- Species: C. convexicolle

Binomial name
- Cerophytum convexicolle LeConte, 1866

Species of beetle

Cerophytum convexicolle is a species of rare click beetle in the family Cerophytidae. It is found in North America.
