= Malthodes oregonus =

Scientific classification
- Kingdom: Animalia
- Phylum: Arthropoda
- Class: Insecta
- Order: Coleoptera
- Suborder: Polyphaga
- Infraorder: Elateriformia
- Family: Cantharidae
- Genus: Malthodes
- Species: M. oregonus

Binomial name
- Malthodes oregonus Fender, 1943

Species of beetle

Malthodes oregonus is a species of soldier beetle in the family Cantharidae. It is found in North America.
