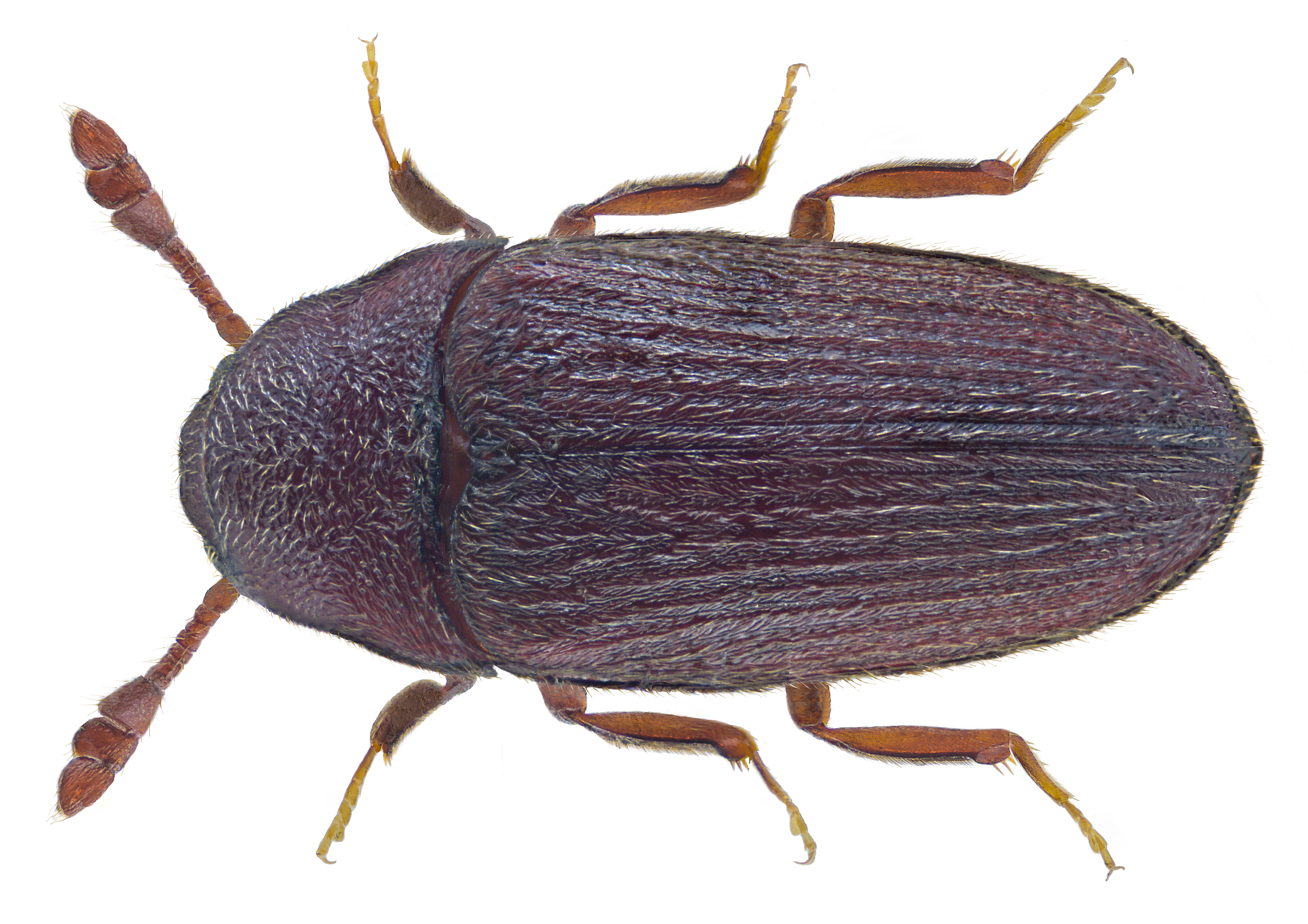
- Trixagus dermestoides

Scientific classification
- Domain: Eukaryota
- Kingdom: Animalia
- Phylum: Arthropoda
- Class: Insecta
- Order: Coleoptera
- Suborder: Polyphaga
- Infraorder: Elateriformia
- Family: Throscidae
- Genus: Trixagus; Kugelann, 1794

= Trixagus =

Genus of beetles

Trixagus is a genus of small false click beetles in the family Throscidae. There are more than 30 described species in Trixagus.

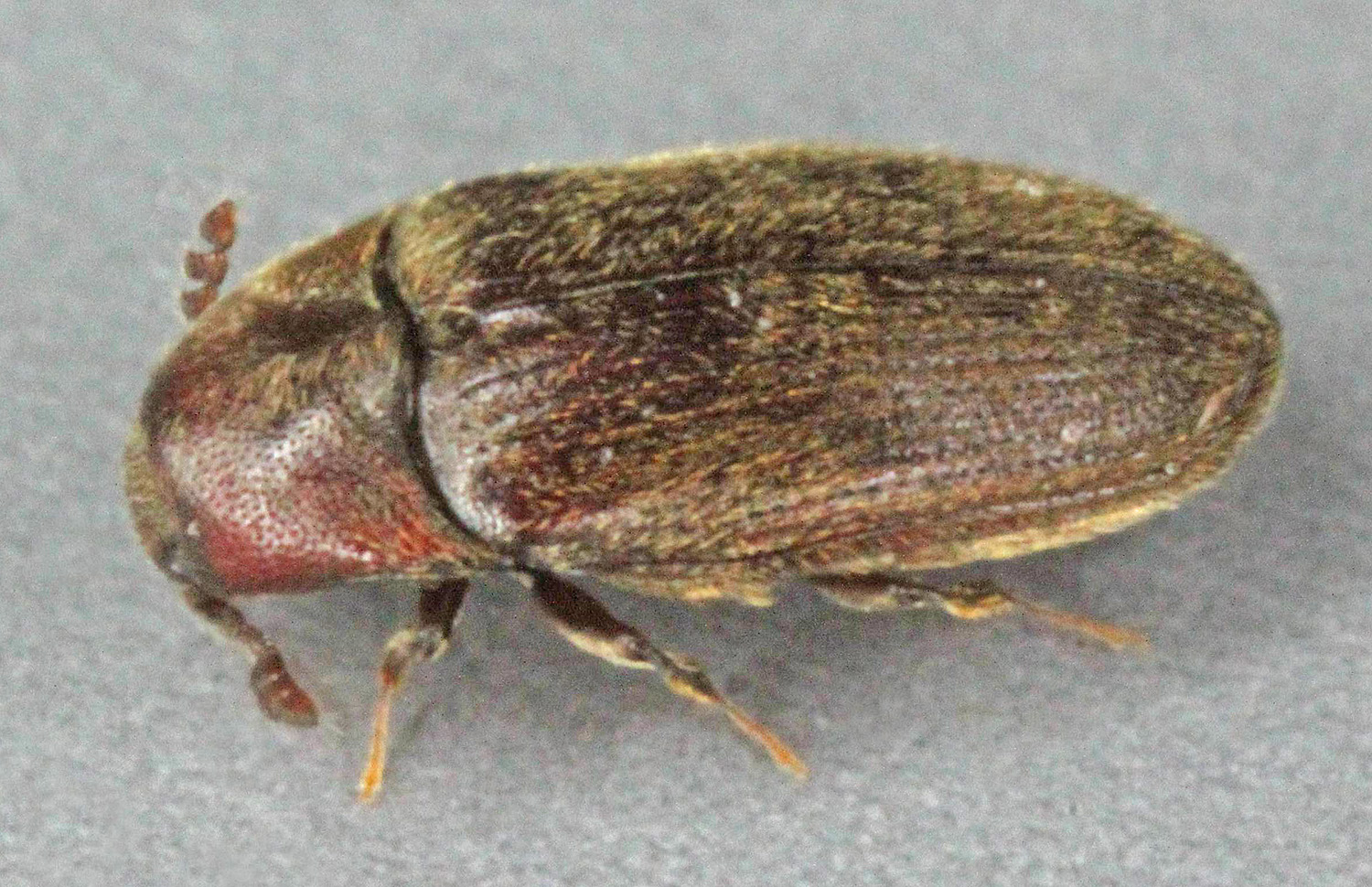
Trixagus dermestoides

== Species ==
These 32 species belong to the genus Trixagus:

- Trixagus acutus (Horn, 1890)
- Trixagus algiricus (Bonvouloir, 1861)
- Trixagus asiaticus (Bonvouloir, 1859)
- Trixagus atticus Reitter, 1921
- Trixagus bachofeni Reitter, 1905
- Trixagus carinicollis (Schaeffer, 1916)
- Trixagus carinifrons (Bonvouloir, 1859)
- Trixagus chevrolati (Bonvouloir, 1859)
- Trixagus cobosi Yensen, 1980
- Trixagus dermestoides (Linnaeus, 1767)
- Trixagus duvalii (Bonvouloir, 1859)
- Trixagus elateroides (Heer, 1841)
- Trixagus extraneus Fisher, 1942
- Trixagus exul (Bonvouloir, 1859)
- Trixagus gracilis Wollaston, 1854
- Trixagus horni (Blanchard, 1917)
- Trixagus leseigneuri Muona, 2002
- Trixagus majusculus Kovalev & al., 2012
- Trixagus mendax (Horn, 1885)
- Trixagus meybohmi Leseigneur, 2005
- Trixagus micado
- Trixagus minutus Rey, 1891
- Trixagus obtusus (Curtis, 1827)
- Trixagus orientalis (Bonvouloir, 1859)
- Trixagus ovalis Reitter, 1921
- Trixagus peritulus Cockerell, 1925
- Trixagus rougeti (Fauvel, 1885)
- Trixagus sericeus (LeConte, 1868)
- Trixagus sosnovskyi (Yablokov-Khnzorian, 1962)
- Trixagus trivialis (Horn, 1890)
- Trixagus turgidus Hisamatsu, 1985
- † Throscus peritulus Cockerell, 1925
