= Malthodes parvulus =

Scientific classification
- Domain: Eukaryota
- Kingdom: Animalia
- Phylum: Arthropoda
- Class: Insecta
- Order: Coleoptera
- Suborder: Polyphaga
- Infraorder: Elateriformia
- Family: Cantharidae
- Genus: Malthodes
- Species: M. parvulus

Binomial name
- Malthodes parvulus (LeConte, 1851)

Species of beetle

Malthodes parvulus is a species of soldier beetle in the family Cantharidae. It is found in North America.
