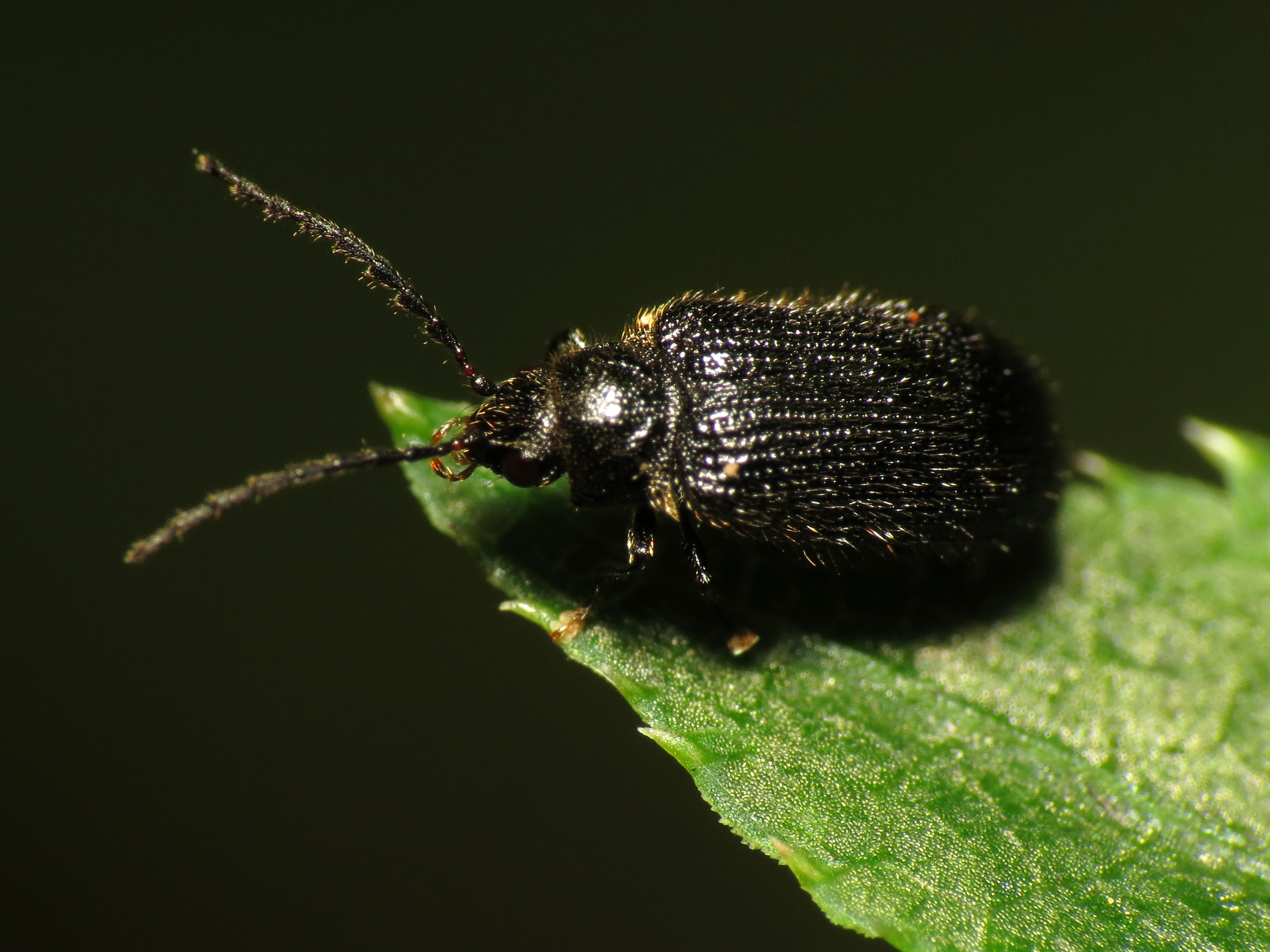
- Eurypogon niger

Scientific classification
- Kingdom: Animalia
- Phylum: Arthropoda
- Class: Insecta
- Order: Coleoptera
- Suborder: Polyphaga
- Infraorder: Elateriformia
- Family: Artematopodidae
- Genus: Eurypogon; Motschulsky, 1859

= Eurypogon =

Genus of beetles

Eurypogon is a genus of soft-bodied plant beetles in the family Artematopodidae. There are about 11 described species in Eurypogon.

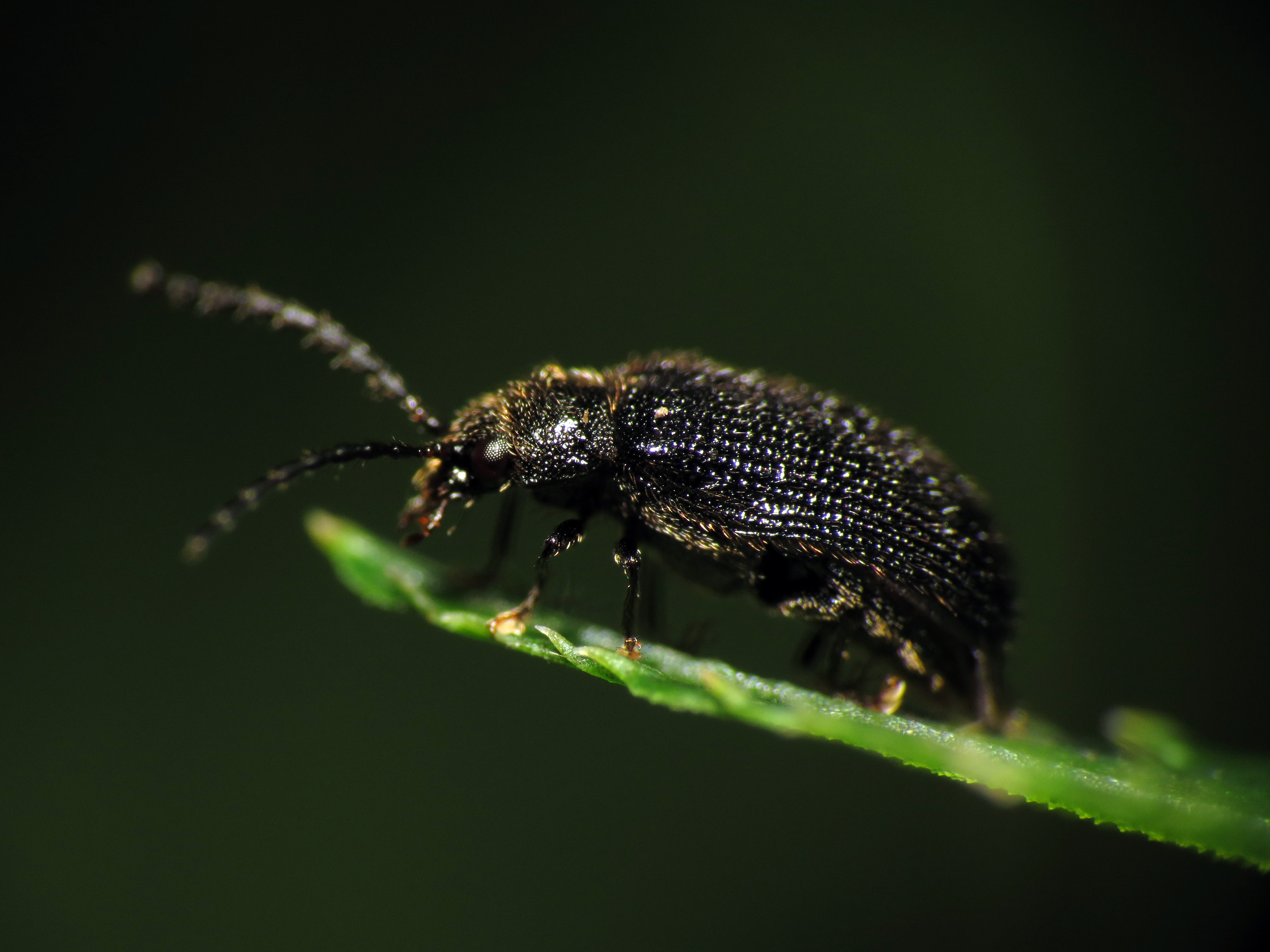
Eurypogon niger

== Species ==
These 11 species belong to the genus Eurypogon:

- Eurypogon brevipennis Sakai, 1982
- Eurypogon californicus Horn, 1880
- Eurypogon cribratus (Hampe, 1866)
- Eurypogon granulatus Sakai, 1982
- Eurypogon harrisii (Westwood, 1862)
- Eurypogon heishuiensis Kundrata, Bocakova & Bocak, 2013
- Eurypogon hisamatsui Sakai, 1982
- Eurypogon jaechi Kundrata, Bocakova & Bocak, 2013
- Eurypogon japonicus Sakai, 1982
- Eurypogon niger (Melsheimer, 1846)
- Eurypogon ocularis Sakai, 1982
