= Pactopus =

Pactopus Temporal range: Cenomanian–Recent

Scientific classification
- Kingdom: Animalia
- Phylum: Arthropoda
- Class: Insecta
- Order: Coleoptera
- Suborder: Polyphaga
- Infraorder: Elateriformia
- Family: Throscidae
- Genus: Pactopus; LeConte, 1868

Genus of beetles

Pactopus is a genus of small false click beetles in the family Throscidae. There are about six described species in Pactopus.

== Species ==
These six species belong to the genus Pactopus:

- Pactopus americanus Wickham, 1914
- Pactopus avitus Britton, 1960
- Pactopus fafneri Muona, 1993
- Pactopus fasolti Muona, 1993
- Pactopus frohi
- Pactopus horni LeConte, 1868
- †Pactopus burmensis Muona 2019 Burmese amber, Myanmar, Cenomanian
