= Macropogon =

Scientific classification
- Kingdom: Animalia
- Phylum: Arthropoda
- Class: Insecta
- Order: Coleoptera
- Suborder: Polyphaga
- Infraorder: Elateriformia
- Family: Artematopodidae
- Genus: Macropogon; Motschulsky, 1845

Genus of beetles

Macropogon is a genus of soft-bodied plant beetles in the family Artematopodidae. The genus was first described in 1845 by Russian entomologist, Victor Motschulsky, where he gives the type species as M. sibiricum "found in the Daouerie Alps". There are at least three described species in Macropogon. while BioLib lists an additional four.

== Species ==
These three species belong to the genus Macropogon:

- Macropogon piceus LeConte, 1861
- Macropogon sequoiae Hopping, 1936
- Macropogon testaceipennis Motschulsky, 1859

In addition to these, BioLib lists a further four species:

- Macropogon dongatua Pic, 1927
- Macropogon niger (Melsheimer, 1846)
- Macropogon pubescens Motschschulsky
- Macropogon sibiricus Motschulsky
