= Iberobaenia =

Scientific classification
- Kingdom: Animalia
- Phylum: Arthropoda
- Class: Insecta
- Order: Coleoptera
- Suborder: Polyphaga
- Infraorder: Elateriformia
- Superfamily: Elateroidea
- Family: Iberobaeniidae; Bocak et al., 2016
- Genus: Iberobaenia; Bocak et al., 2016

species
- see text

Genus of beetles

Iberobaenia is a genus of elateroid beetle. It is the only member of the family Iberobaeniidae. It was first described in 2016, from two species found in Southern Spain. A third species was described in 2017, from the same region. Like some other members of the Elateroidea, the females are neotenic.

== Species ==
- Iberobaenia andujari Kundrata et al, 2017
- Iberobaenia minuta Bocak et al., 2016
- Iberobaenia lencinai Bocak et al., 2016
