= Ctesibius (beetle) =

Scientific classification
- Kingdom: Animalia
- Phylum: Arthropoda
- Clade: Pancrustacea
- Class: Insecta
- Order: Coleoptera
- Suborder: Polyphaga
- Infraorder: Elateriformia
- Family: Artematopodidae
- Subfamily: Electribiinae
- Genus: Ctesibius; Champion, 1897

Species
- See text

Genus of beetles

Ctesibius is a genus of soft-bodied plant beetles in the family Artematopodidae. There is at least one described species in Ctesibius, C. eumolpoides.
