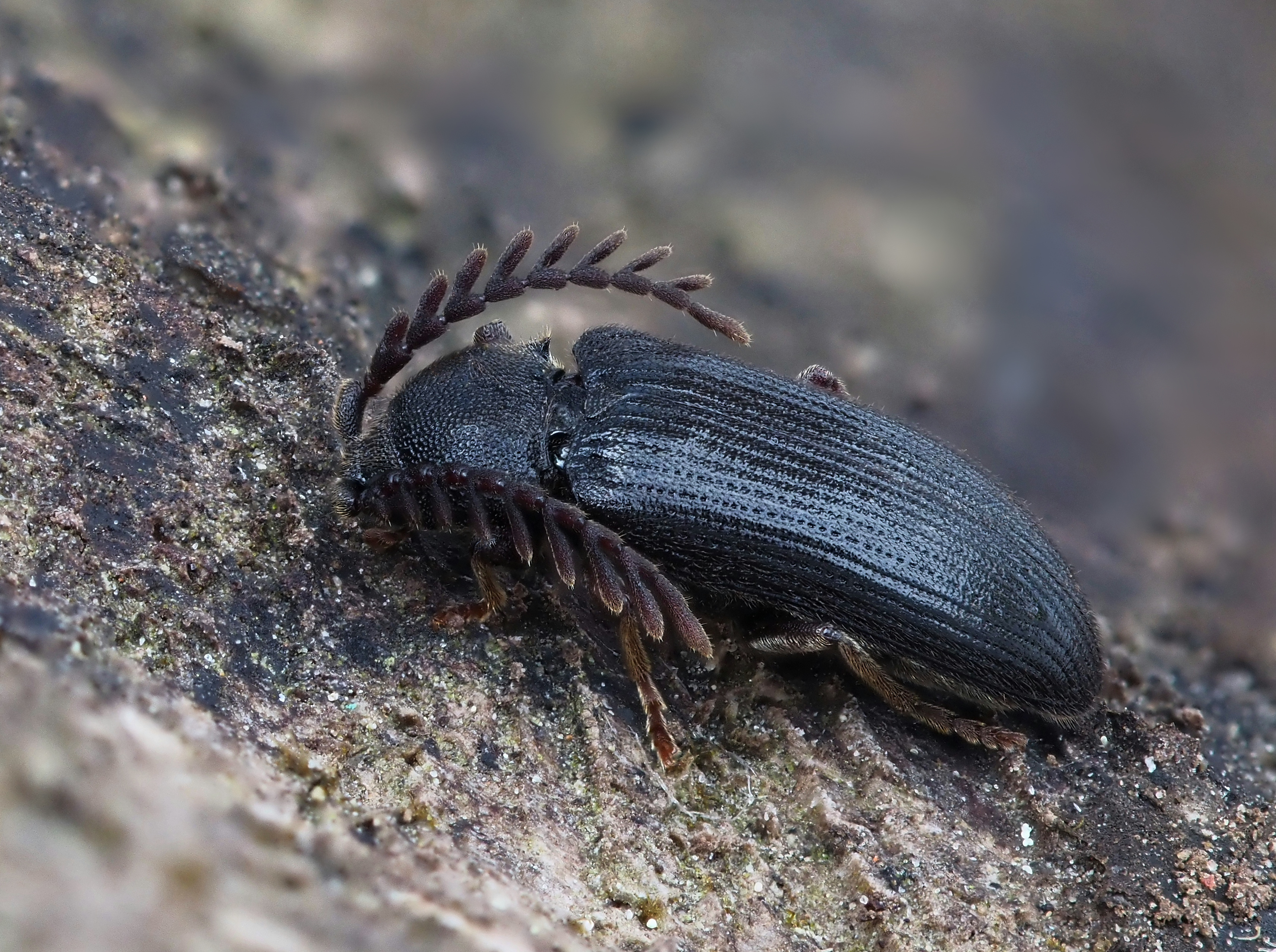
- Cerophytum elateroides

Scientific classification
- Kingdom: Animalia
- Phylum: Arthropoda
- Clade: Pancrustacea
- Class: Insecta
- Order: Coleoptera
- Suborder: Polyphaga
- Infraorder: Elateriformia
- Superfamily: Elateroidea
- Family: Cerophytidae; Latreille, 1834

Genera
- See text

Synonyms
- Praelateriidae Dolin, 1973

= Cerophytidae =

Cerophytidae Temporal range: Early Jurassic–Recent

Family of beetles

The Cerophytidae are a family of beetles belonging to Elateroidea. Larvae are associated with rotting wood, on which they are presumed to feed. The family contains over 20 species in five genera, primarily distributed in the New World, but also in Eurasia and Africa. 17 fossil species in 7 genera are known extending to the Early Jurassic. Like some other elateroids, the adults are capable of clicking.

== Taxonomy ==
After

Mesozoic clade:

- †Elaterocoleus Dolin 1973 Dzhil Formation, Kyrgyzstan, Early Jurassic (Hettangian-Sinemurian)
- †Praelaterium Dolin 1973 Dzhil Formation, Kyrgyzstan, Hettangian-Sinemurian
- †Necromeropsis Yu et al. 2019 Burmese amber, Myanmar, Late Cretaceous (Cenomanian)
- †Aphytocerus Zherikhin 1977 Taimyr Amber, Russia, Late Cretaceous (Cenomanian-Santonian)
- †Jurassophytum Yu et al. 2019 Jiulongshan Formation, China, Middle Jurassic (Callovian)
- †Necromera Martynov 1926 Jiulongshan Formation, China, Callovian, Karabastau Formation, Kazakhstan, Late Jurassic (Oxfordian) Laiyang Formation, Yixian Formation, China, Early Cretaceous (Aptian)

Extant clade:

- †Wongaroo Oberprieler et al. 2016 Talbragar Fossil Fish Bed, Australia, Late Jurassic (Tithonian)
- †Baissophytum Chang et al. 2011 Zaza Formation, Russia, Aptian
- †Baissopsis Kirejtshuk 2013 Zaza Formation, Russia, Aptian
- †Amberophytum Yu et al. 2019 Burmese amber, Myanmar, Cenomanian
- Genus Afrocerophytum Costa, Vanin et Rosa, 2014
  - Afrocerophytum vix Costa, Vanin et Rosa, 2014
- Genus Aphytocerus Zherikhin, 1977
  - Aphytocerus communis Zherikhin, 1977
- Genus Brachycerophytum Costa, Vanin, Lawrence & Ide, 2003
  - Brachycerophytum sinchona Costa, Vanin, Lawrence & Ide, 2003
- Genus Cerophytum Latreille, 1806
  - Cerophytum convexicolle LeConte, 1866
  - Cerophytum japonicum Sasaji, 1999
  - Cerophytum pulsator (Haldeman, 1845)
- Genus Phytocerum Costa, Vanin, Lawrence & Ide, 2003
  - Phytocerum alleni Costa, Vanin, Lawrence & Ide, 2003
  - Phytocerum belloi Costa, Vanin, Lawrence & Ide, 2003
  - Phytocerum birai Costa, Vanin, Lawrence & Ide, 2003
  - Phytocerum boliviense (Golbach, 1983)
  - Phytocerum burakowskii Costa, Vanin, Lawrence & Ide, 2003
  - Phytocerum cayennense (de Bonvouloir, 1870)
  - Phytocerum distinguendum (Soares & Peracchi, 1964)
  - Phytocerum golbachi Costa, Vanin, Lawrence & Ide, 2003
  - Phytocerum ingens Costa, Vanin, Lawrence & Ide, 2003
  - Phytocerum inpa Costa, Vanin, Lawrence & Ide, 2003
  - Phytocerum minutum (Golbach, 1983)
  - Phytocerum serraticorne Costa, Vanin, Lawrence & Ide, 2003
  - Phytocerum simonkai Costa, Vanin, Lawrence & Ide, 2003
  - Phytocerum trinidadense (Golbach, 1983)
  - Phytocerum zikani (Soares & Peracchi, 1964)
