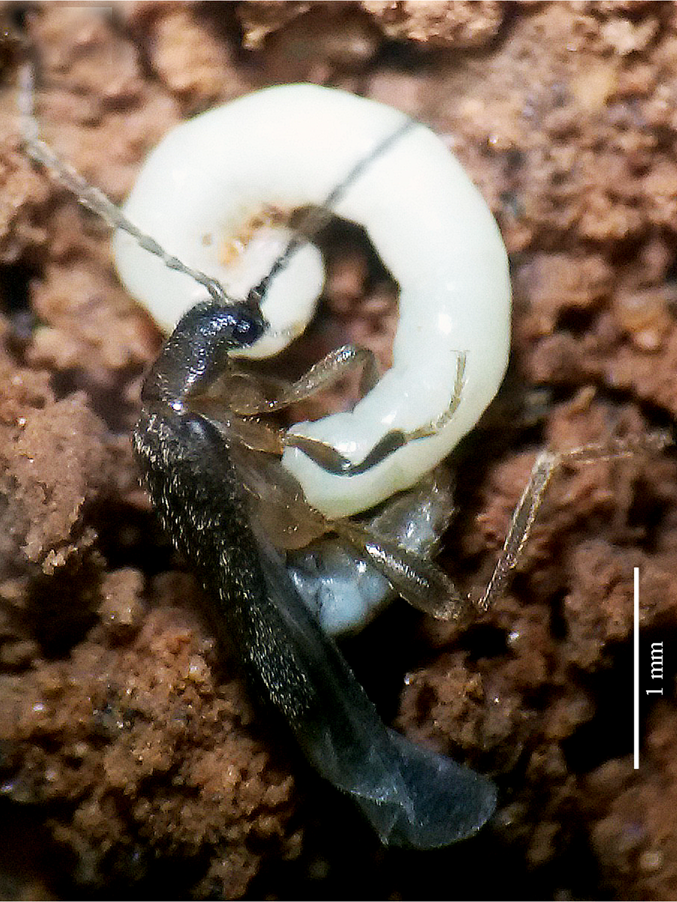
- Adult male of Jurasai itajubense mating with a neotenic adult female

Scientific classification
- Kingdom: Animalia
- Phylum: Arthropoda
- Clade: Pancrustacea
- Class: Insecta
- Order: Coleoptera
- Suborder: Polyphaga
- Infraorder: Elateriformia
- Superfamily: Elateroidea
- Family: Jurasaidae; Rosa, Costa, Kramp & Kundrata, 2020

= Jurasaidae =

Family of beetles

Jurasaidae is a family of elateroid beetles known from around a half-dozen species in two genera found the Brazilian Atlantic rainforest including drier transitional areas bordering the Caatinga. All known species have neotenic larva-like females and normal males, similar to some other elateroids. They occur in the soil horizon immediately under leaf litter, with the larvae likely being fungivorous, consuming the fluids of fungal hyphae.

== Taxonomy ==
- Genus Jurasai Rosa et al., 2020
  - Jurasai digitusdei Rosa et al., 2020
  - Jurasai itajubense Rosa et al., 2020
  - Jurasai miraculum Biffi et al., 2021
  - Jurasai parahybanum Nunes et al., 2023
  - Jurasai vanini Biffi et al., 2021
  - Jurasai ypauoca Roza, 2021
- Genus Tujamita Rosa et al., 2020
  - Tujamita plenalatum Rosa et al., 2020
