= Brevipogon =

Scientific classification
- Domain: Eukaryota
- Kingdom: Animalia
- Phylum: Arthropoda
- Class: Insecta
- Order: Coleoptera
- Suborder: Polyphaga
- Infraorder: Elateriformia
- Family: Artematopodidae
- Genus: Brevipogon; Lawrence, 2005

Genus of beetles

Brevipogon is a genus of soft-bodied plant beetles in the family Artematopodidae. There is one described species in Brevipogon, B. confusus.
