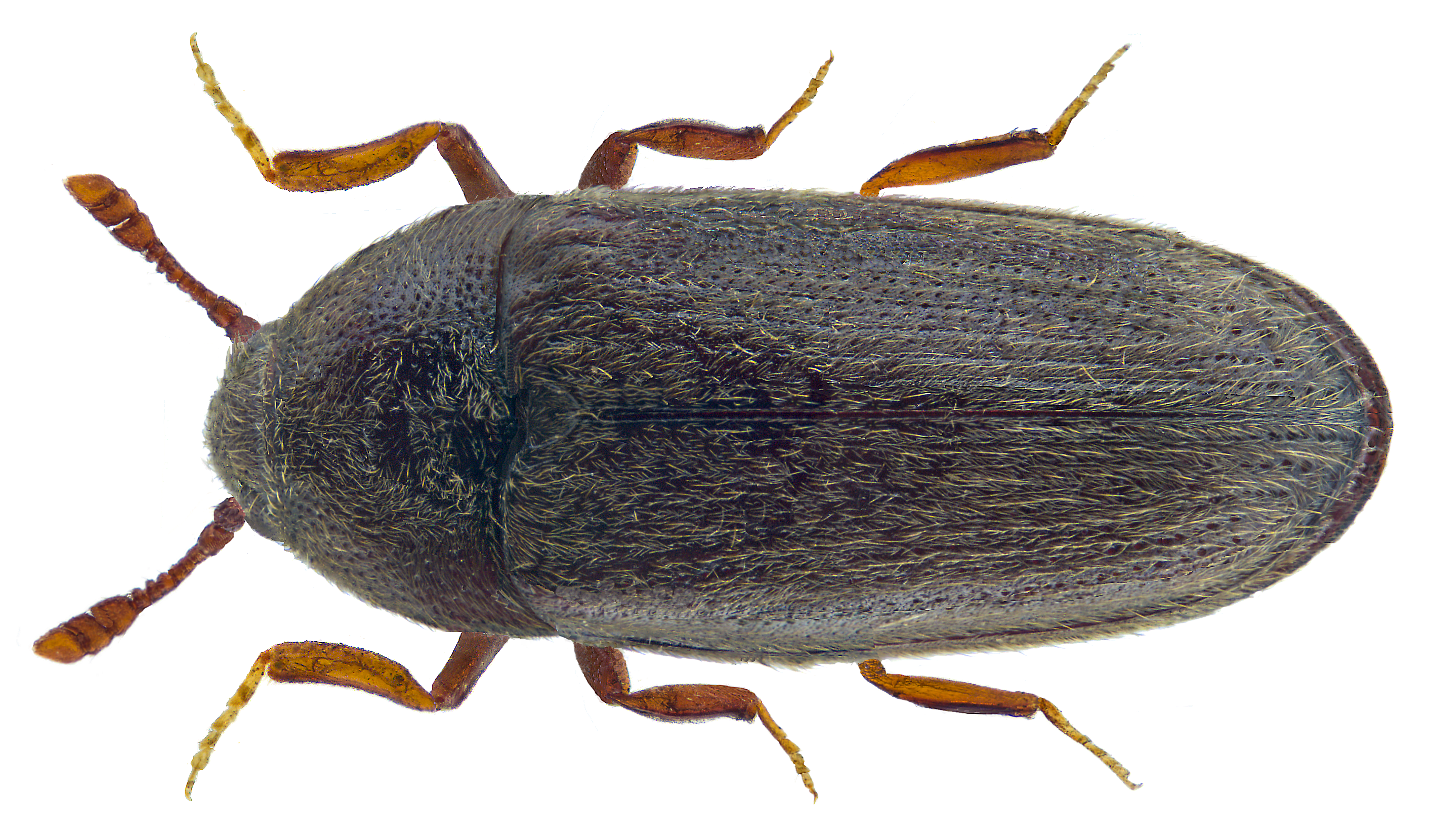
- Aulonothroscus brevicollis

Scientific classification
- Domain: Eukaryota
- Kingdom: Animalia
- Phylum: Arthropoda
- Class: Insecta
- Order: Coleoptera
- Suborder: Polyphaga
- Infraorder: Elateriformia
- Family: Throscidae
- Genus: Aulonothroscus; Horn, 1890

= Aulonothroscus =

Genus of beetles

Aulonothroscus is a genus of small false click beetles in the family Throscidae. There are more than 20 described species in Aulonothroscus.

== Species ==
These 26 species belong to the genus Aulonothroscus:

- Aulonothroscus bicarinatus Fleutiaux, 1911
- Aulonothroscus brevicollis (Bonvouloir, 1859)
- Aulonothroscus calocerus (Bonvouloir, 1860)
- Aulonothroscus constrictor (Say, 1839)
- Aulonothroscus convergens (Horn, 1885)
- Aulonothroscus detritus Blanchard, 1917
- Aulonothroscus distans Blanchard, 1917
- Aulonothroscus elongatulus (Wollaston, 1865)
- Aulonothroscus grancanariae (Franz, 1982)
- Aulonothroscus integer (Wollaston, 1857)
- Aulonothroscus laticeps Blanchard, 1917
- Aulonothroscus laticollis (Rybinski, 1897)
- Aulonothroscus latiusculus (Wollaston, 1865)
- Aulonothroscus nodifrons Blanchard, 1917
- Aulonothroscus parallelus Blanchard, 1917
- Aulonothroscus pugnax (Horn, 1885)
- Aulonothroscus punctatus (Bonvouloir, 1859)
- Aulonothroscus rugosiceps Schaeffer, 1916
- Aulonothroscus schwarzi Blanchard, 1917
- Aulonothroscus tambopata Johnson, 2016
- Aulonothroscus tenerifae (Franz, 1982)
- Aulonothroscus teretrius Blanchard, 1917
- Aulonothroscus tschitscherini Yablokov-Khnzorian, 1962
- Aulonothroscus validus (LeConte, 1868)
- Aulonothroscus wollastoni (Franz, 1982)
- † Throscites tschitscherini Yablokov-Khnzorian, 1962
