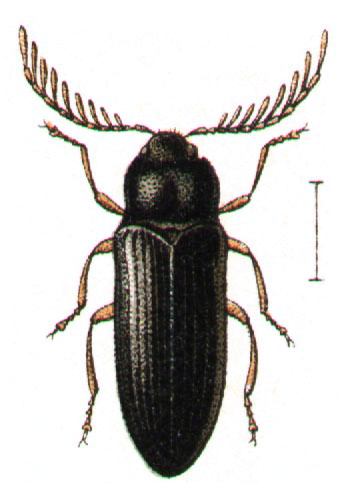
- Cerophytum elateroides

Scientific classification
- Kingdom: Animalia
- Phylum: Arthropoda
- Class: Insecta
- Order: Coleoptera
- Suborder: Polyphaga
- Infraorder: Elateriformia
- Family: Cerophytidae
- Genus: Cerophytum; Latreille, 1809

= Cerophytum =

Genus of beetles

Cerophytum is a genus of rare click beetles in the family Cerophytidae. There are at least four described species in Cerophytum.

== Species ==
These four species belong to the genus Cerophytum:

- Cerophytum convexicolle LeConte, 1866
- Cerophytum elateroides (Latreille, 1804)
- Cerophytum japonicum Sasaji, 1999
- Cerophytum pulsator (Haldeman, 1845)
