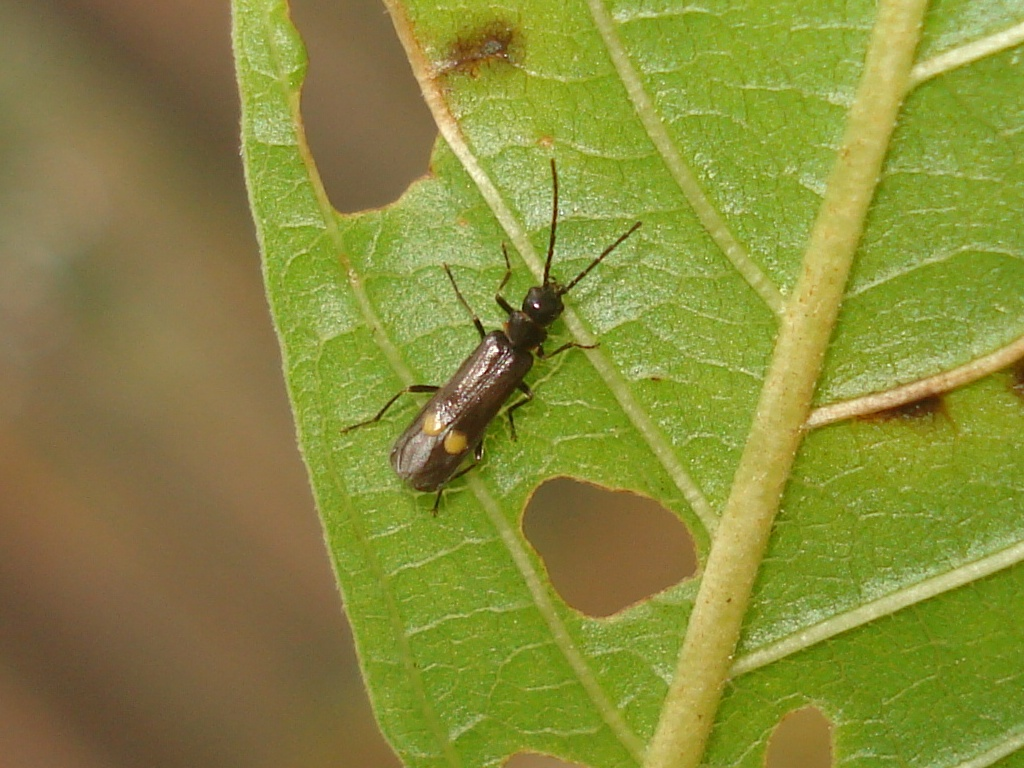
- Malthodes marginatus

Scientific classification
- Kingdom: Animalia
- Phylum: Arthropoda
- Class: Insecta
- Order: Coleoptera
- Suborder: Polyphaga
- Infraorder: Elateriformia
- Family: Cantharidae
- Genus: Malthodes
- Species: M. marginatus

Binomial name
- Malthodes marginatus (Latreille, 1806)

= Malthodes marginatus =

Species of beetle

Malthodes marginatus is a species of soldier beetles native to Europe.
