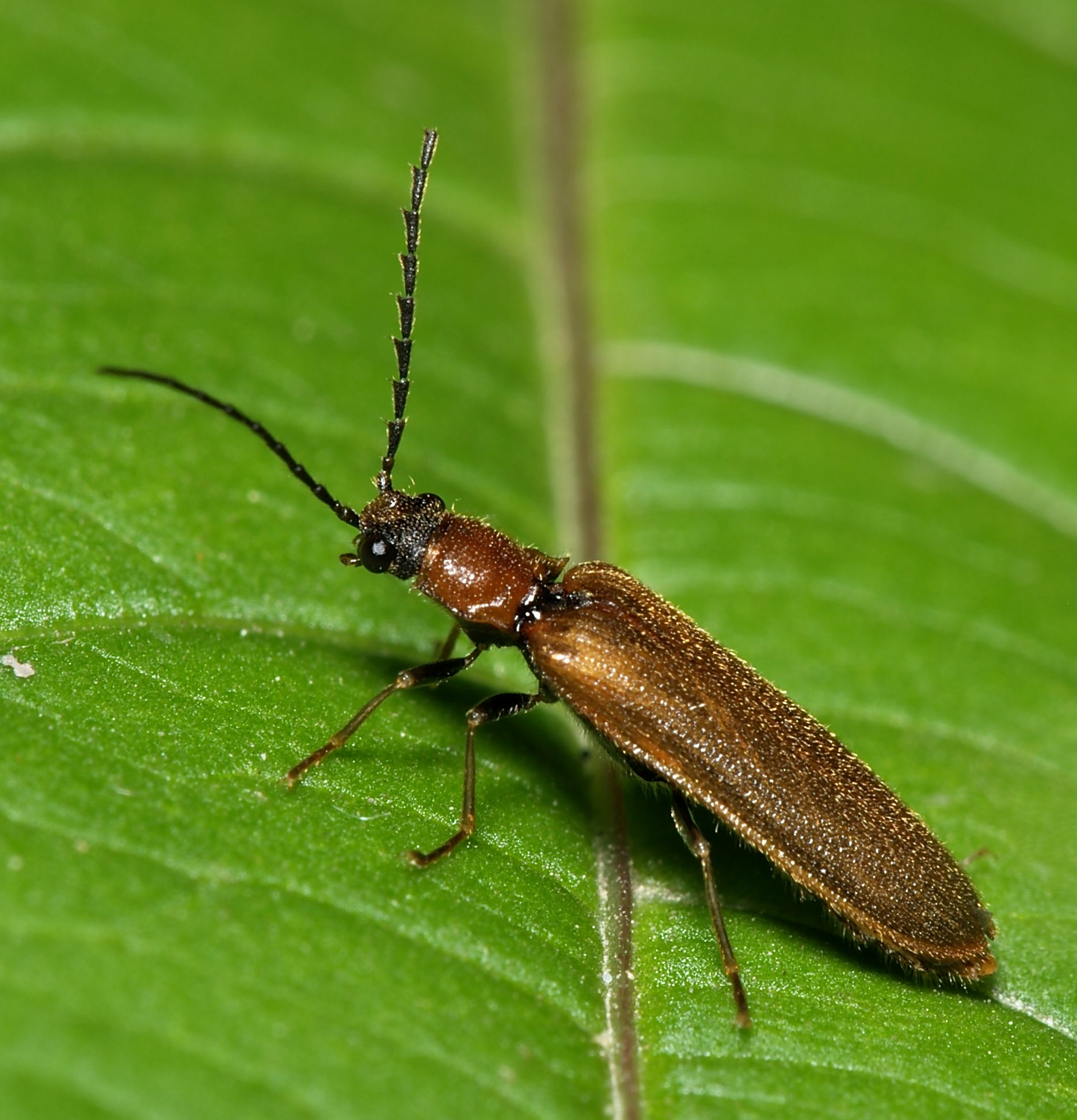
- Denticollis linearis, a click beetle (Elateridae)

Scientific classification
- Kingdom: Animalia
- Phylum: Arthropoda
- Clade: Pancrustacea
- Class: Insecta
- Order: Coleoptera
- Suborder: Polyphaga
- Infraorder: Elateriformia
- Superfamily: Elateroidea; Leach, 1815

Families
- About 15-20, see text

= Elateroidea =

Elateroidea Temporal range: Late Triassic–Recent

Superfamily of beetles

Larva of Lampyridae: Ototretinae

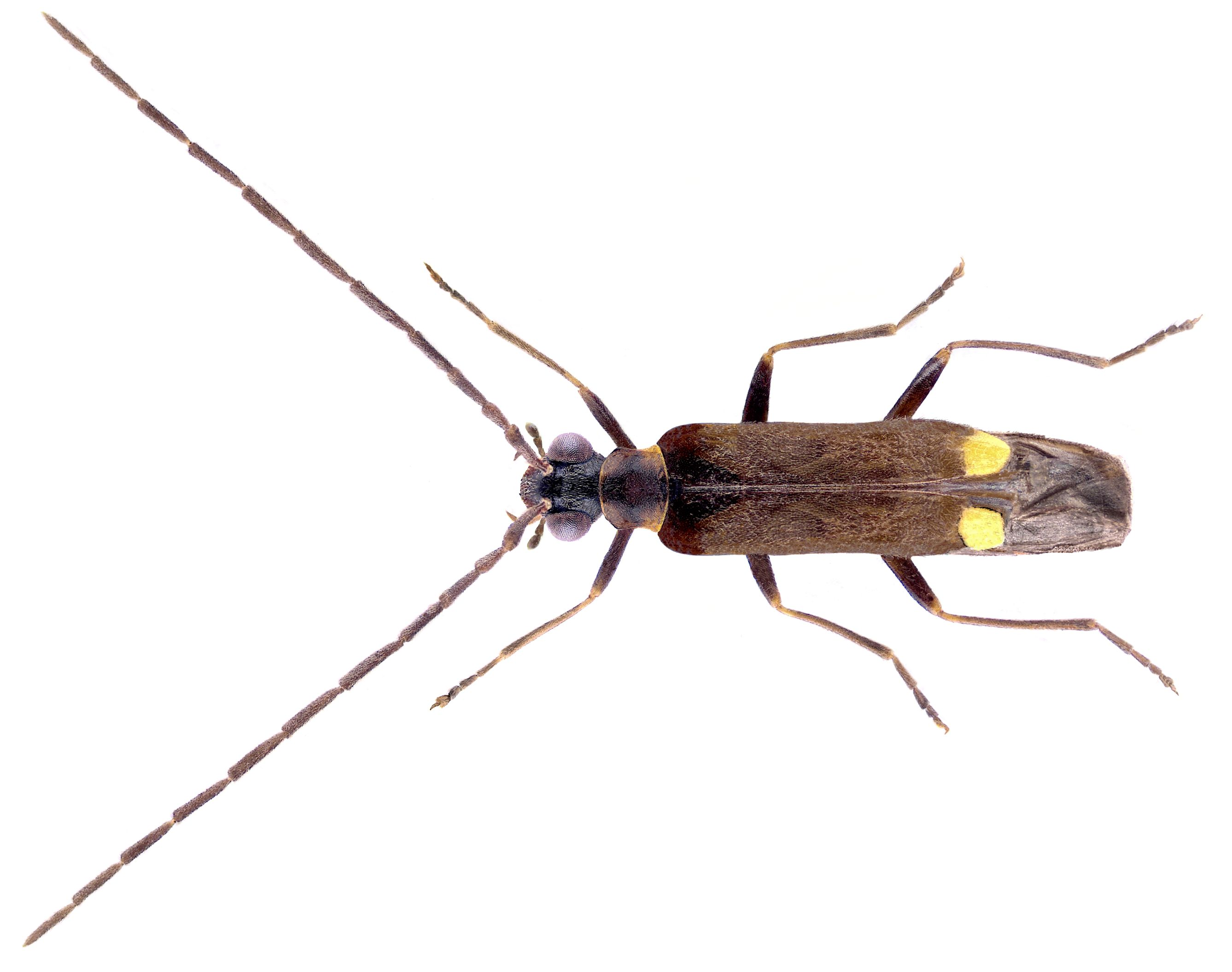
Malthodes marginatus (Cantharidae)

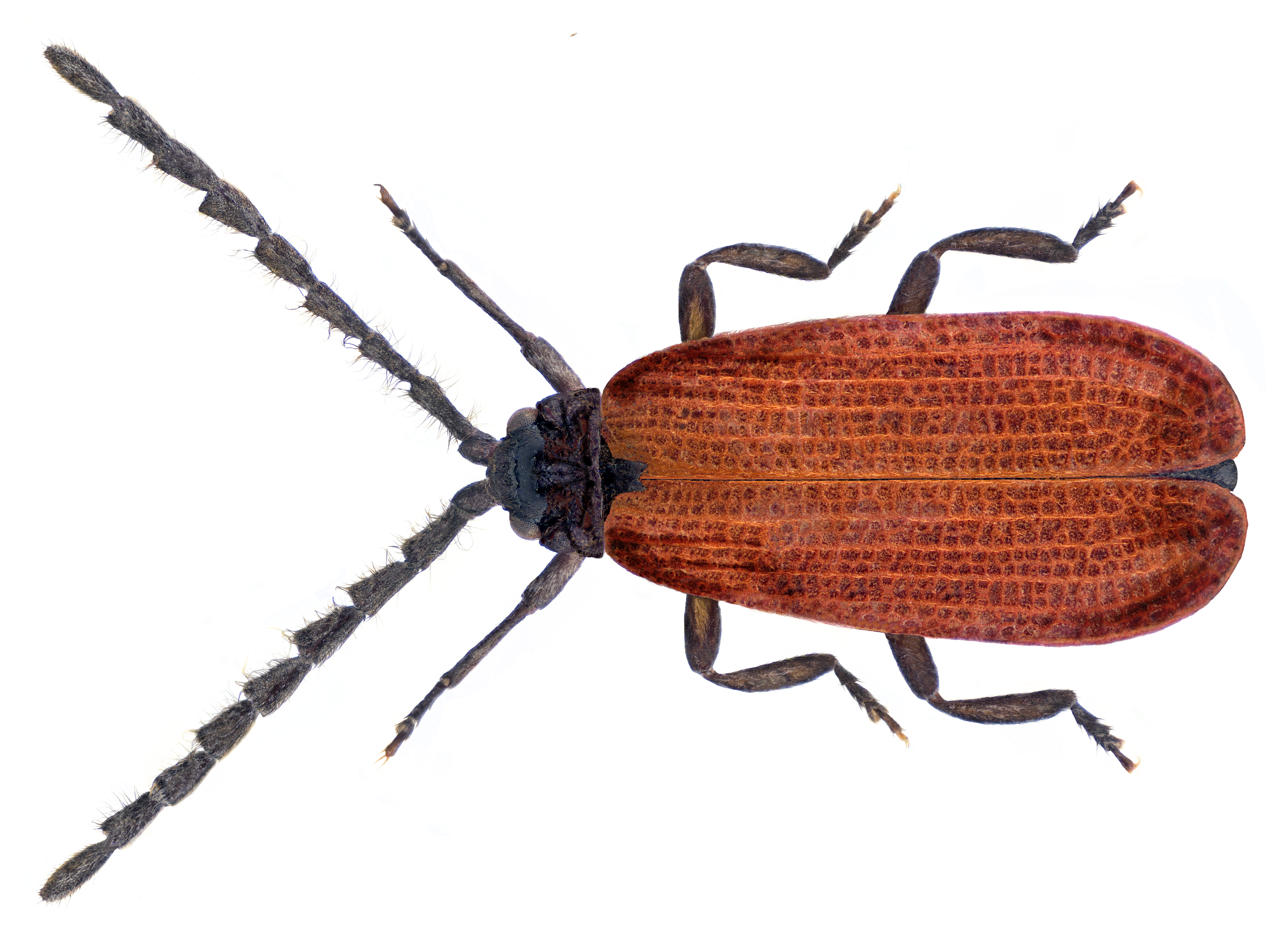
Taphes brevicollis (Lycidae)

The Elateroidea are a large superfamily of beetles. It contains the familiar click beetles, fireflies, and soldier beetles and their relatives. It consists of about 25,000 species.

== Description ==
Elateroidea is a morphologically diverse group, including hard-bodied beetles with 5 abdominal ventrites, soft-bodied beetles with 7-8 ventrites connected with membranes (formerly known as cantharoids), and beetles with intermediate forms. They have a range of sizes and colours, but in terms of shape, they are usually narrow and parallel-sided as adults.

Many of the sclerotised elateroids (Cerophytidae, Eucnemidae, Throscidae, Elateridae) have a clicking mechanism. This is a peg on the prothorax which fits into a cavity in the mesothorax. When a click beetle bends its body, the peg snaps into the cavity, causing the beetle's body to straighten so suddenly that it jumps into the air.

Most beetles capable of bioluminescence are in the Elateroidea, in the families Lampyridae (~2000 species), Phengodidae (~200 species), Rhagophthalmidae (100 species) and Elateridae (>100 species).

Females in several lineages, including Lycidae, Lampyridae, Phengogidae and Rhagophthalmidae, do not pupate and remain in a larval form. This trait is estimated to have evolved independently at least three times within the superfamily.

Some Elateroidea, including species of Cantharidae and Lycidae, have bright aposematic colours to signal to predators that they are poisonous and so should not be eaten.

== Families ==
The validity and relationships of some families, such as Podabrocephalidae are not fully resolved. The family Rhinorhipidae has recently been removed to its own superfamily, with evidence that it is a basal taxon within Elateriformia dating to an Upper Triassic/Lower Jurassic split from other extant beetle lineages.

- Artematopodidae Lacordaire, 1857 – soft-bodied plant beetles (= Eurypogonidae)
- Brachypsectridae Leconte & Horn, 1883 – Texas beetles
- Badmaateridae Grebennikov et al., 2026
- Cantharidae Imhoff, 1856 – soldier beetles
- Cerophytidae Latreille, 1834 – rare click beetles
- Elateridae Leach, 1815 – click beetles (including Ampedidae, Balgidae, Dicronychidae, Drilidae, Lissomidae, Plastoceridae, Prosternidae, Protelateridae, Pyrophoridae, Synaptidae)
- Eucnemidae Eschscholtz, 1829 – false click beetles (including Anischiidae and Perothopidae)
- Iberobaeniidae Bocak et al., 2016
- Jurasaidae Rosa, Costa, Klamp & Kundrata, 2020
- Lycidae – net-winged beetles
- Omethidae LeConte, 1861 – false firefly beetles (including Telegeusidae)
- Throscidae Laporte, 1840 – false metallic wood-boring beetles (= Trixagidae)
- †Mysteriomorphidae Alekseev and Ellenberger, 2019 (Cretaceous)
- Lampyroid clade
  - †Cretophengodidae Li, Kundrata, Tihelka & Cai, 2021 (Cretaceous)
  - Lampyridae Latreille, 1817 – glow-worms and firefly beetles
  - Phengodidae LeConte 1861 – American glowworm beetles (including Cydistinae)
  - Rhagophthalmidae Olivier, 1907
  - Sinopyrophoridae Bi & Li, 2019 (monotypic)
- Incertae sedis:
  - †Anoeuma Li, Kundrata & Cai, 2022 (Cretaceous)
  - †Partisaniferus Haug et al., 2020 (Cretaceous) (Likely related to Jurasaidae)

== Phylogeny ==
Some morphological and molecular phylogenetic analyses find that Byrrhoidea is either a monophyletic or paraphyletic group closely related to Elateroidea.

Based on Kusy et al. 2018 and 2020

- Elateroidea
  - - Artematopodidae
    - Omethidae
  - - - Throscidae
      - Eucnemidae
    - - Lycidae
      - - Cantharidae
        - - Elateridae
          - - Sinopyrophoridae
            - - Lampyridae
              - - Phengodidae
                - Rhagophthalmidae
