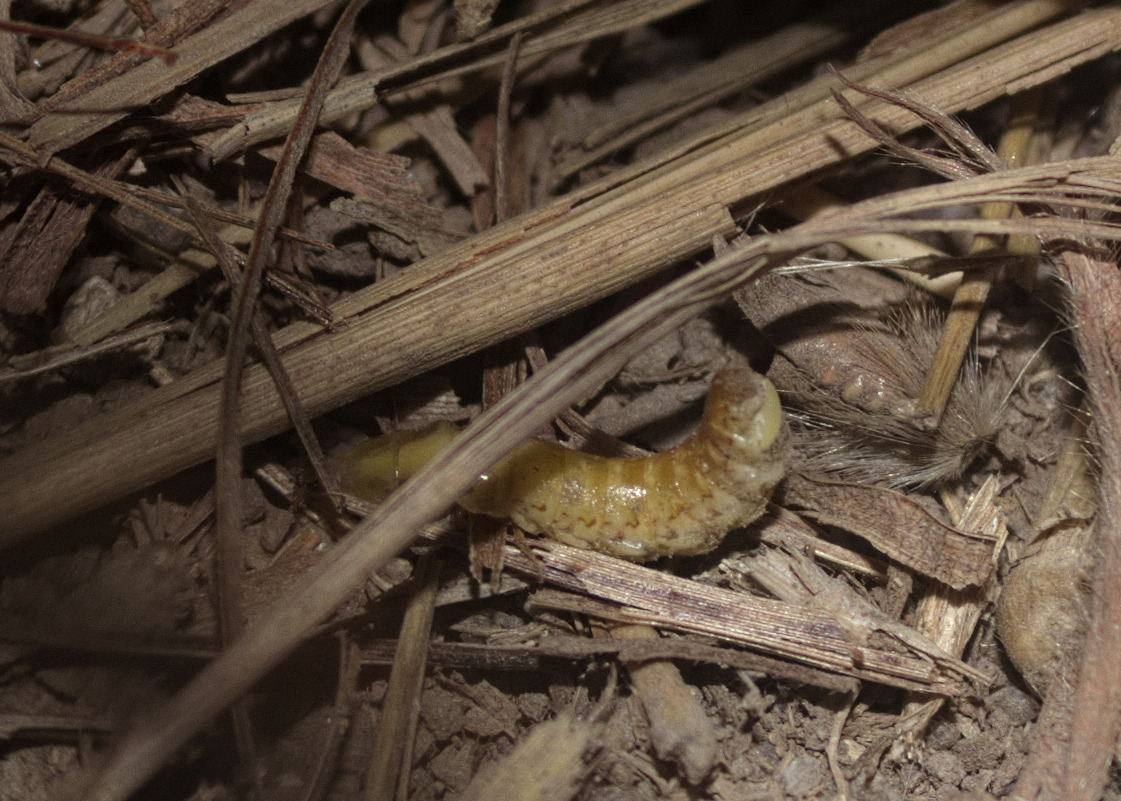
- Rhagophthalmus hiemalis

Scientific classification
- Kingdom: Animalia
- Phylum: Arthropoda
- Clade: Pancrustacea
- Class: Insecta
- Order: Coleoptera
- Suborder: Polyphaga
- Infraorder: Elateriformia
- Superfamily: Elateroidea
- Family: Rhagophthalmidae; Olivier, 1907

Synonyms
- Rhagophthalminae

= Rhagophthalmidae =

Family of beetles

The Rhagophthalmidae are a family of beetles within the superfamily Elateroidea. Members of this beetle family have bioluminescent organs on the larvae, and sometimes adults, and are closely related to the Phengodidae (American glowworm beetles), though historically they have been often treated as a subfamily of Lampyridae, or as related to that family. Some recent evidence suggested that they were the sister group to the Phengodidae, and somewhat distantly related to Lampyridae, whose sister taxon was Cantharidae, but more reliable genome-based phylogenetics placed (Rhagophthalmidae + Phengodidae) as the sister group to the Lampyridae.

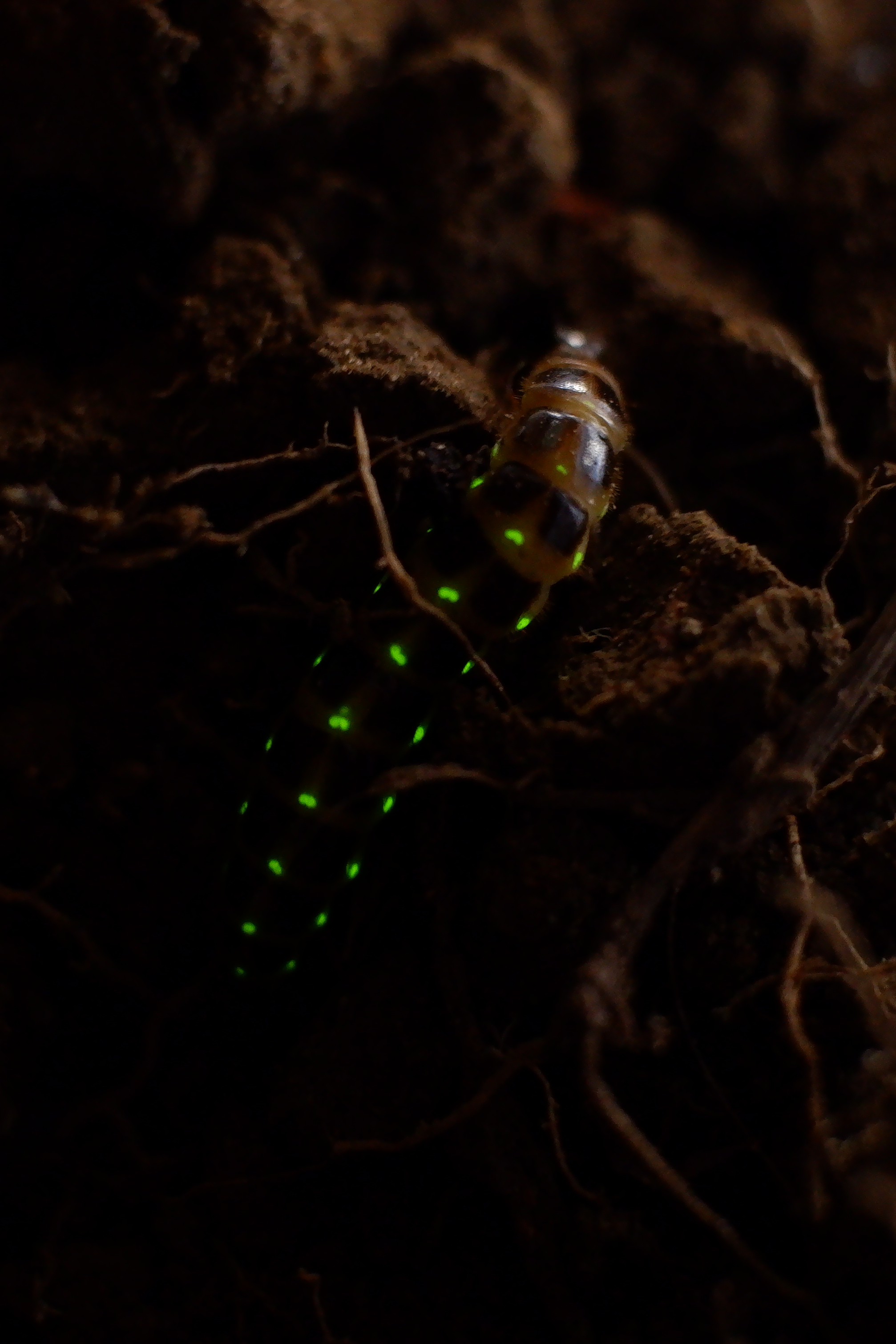
A star worm from the family Rhagothalmidae showing the bioluminescent light organs on each segment

Whatever their relationships may be, Rhagophthalmidae are distributed in the Old World, and little is known of their biology. Females are usually wingless and look like larvae, but have an adult beetle's eyes, antennae and legs; in the genus Diplocladon, they resemble larvae even more, with small light organs on all trunk segments. Larvae and females live in soil and litter and are predaceous; males may be attracted to lights at night.

== Genera ==
The Global Biodiversity Information Facility includes:

1. Bicladodrilus Pic, 1921
2. Bicladum Pic, 1921
3. Cydistus Bourgeois, 1885
4. Dioptoma Pascoe, 1860
5. Diplocladon Gorham, 1883
6. Dodecatoma Westwood, 1843
7. Falsophrixothrix Pic, 1937
8. Haplocladon Gorham, 1883
9. Menghuoius Kawashima, 2000
10. Mimoochotyra Pic, 1937
11. Monodrilus Pic, 1921
12. Pseudothilmanus Pic, 1918
13. Rhagophthalmus Motschulsky, 1854
