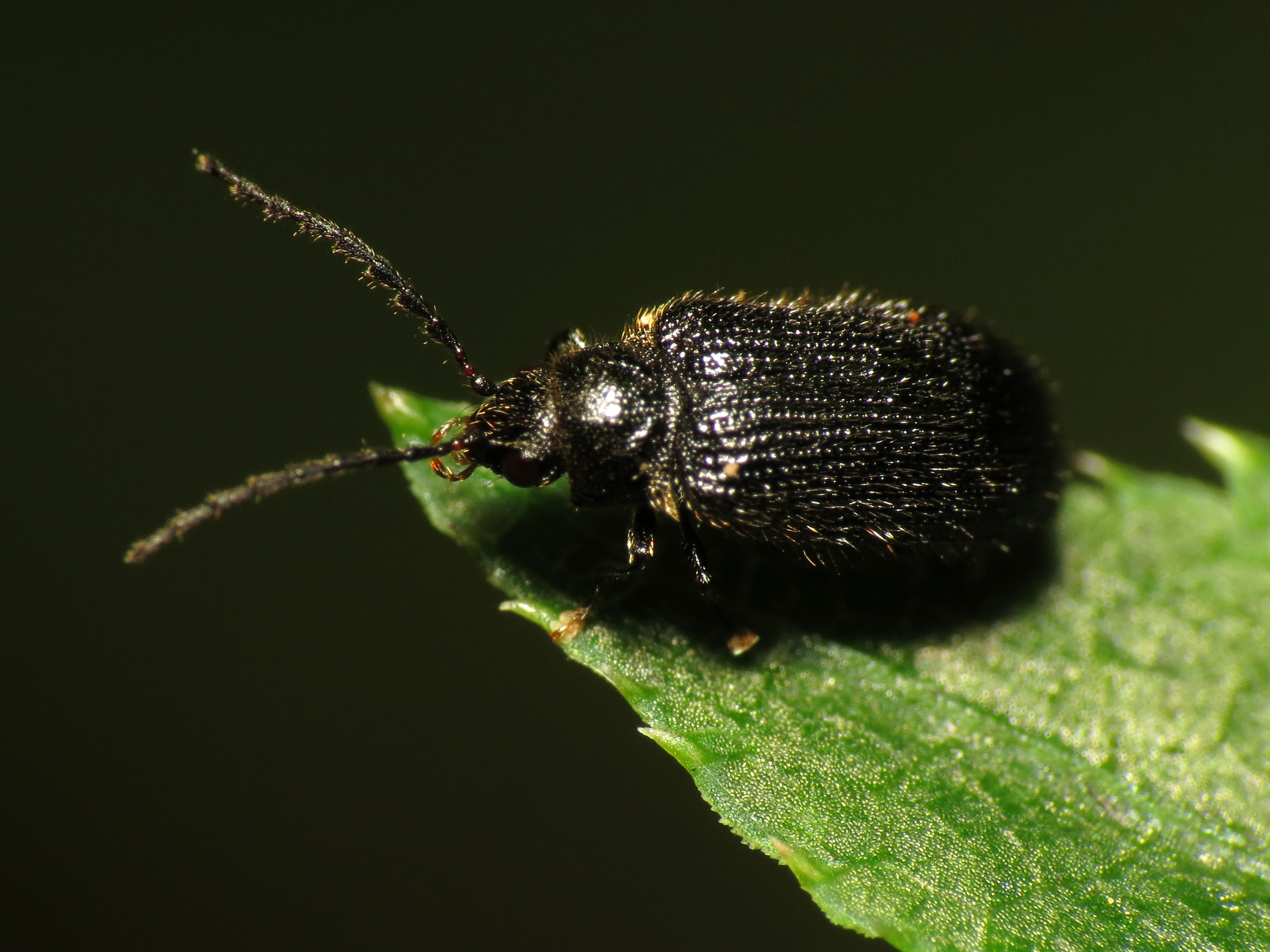
- Eurypogon niger

Scientific classification
- Kingdom: Animalia
- Phylum: Arthropoda
- Clade: Pancrustacea
- Class: Insecta
- Order: Coleoptera
- Suborder: Polyphaga
- Infraorder: Elateriformia
- Superfamily: Elateroidea
- Family: Artematopodidae; Lacordaire, 1857

= Artematopodidae =

Artematopodidae Temporal range: Middle Jurassic–Recent

Family of beetles

Artematopodidae is a family of soft-bodied plant beetles in the superfamily Elateroidea. They are mostly found in understory forest foliage. The life history of the group is obscure, larvae of the genera Eurypogon and Macropogon likely feed on moss, while the larvae of Artematopus have been fed insect remains. The oldest fossils of the family date to the Middle Jurassic.

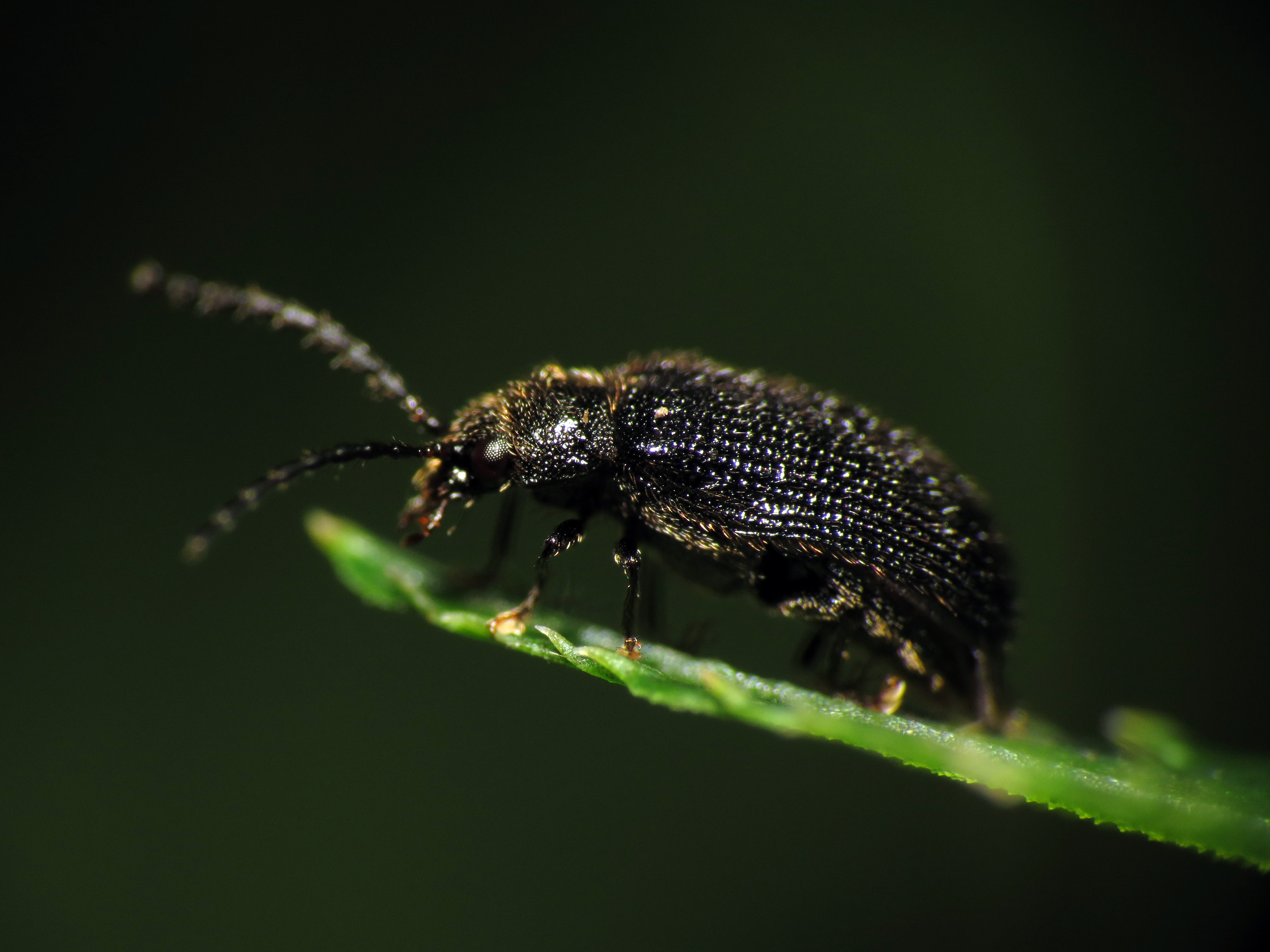
Eurypogon niger

== Genera ==
- Allopogonia Cockerell, 1906
- Artematopus Perty, 1830
- Brevipogon Lawrence, 2005
- Carcinognathus Kirsch, 1873
- Ctesibius Champion, 1897
- Electribius Crowson, 1973
- Eurypogon Motschulsky, 1859
- Macropogon Motschulsky, 1859

=== Extinct genera ===
- †Cretobrevipogon Cai et al, 2020 Yixian Formation, China, Early Cretaceous (Aptian)
- †Sinobrevipogon Cai et al, 2015 Daohugou Beds, China, Middle Jurassic (Callovian)
- †Bipogonia Li et al, 2022 Burmese amber, Myanmar, Late Cretaceous (Cenomanian)
- †Carinibipogonia Li et al, 2022 Burmese amber, Myanmar, Late Cretaceous (Cenomanian)
- †Forticatinius Tan & Ren, 2007 Yixian Formation, China, Early Cretaceous (Aptian)
- †Protartematopus Crowson, 1973
- †Tarsomegamerus Zhang, 2005
