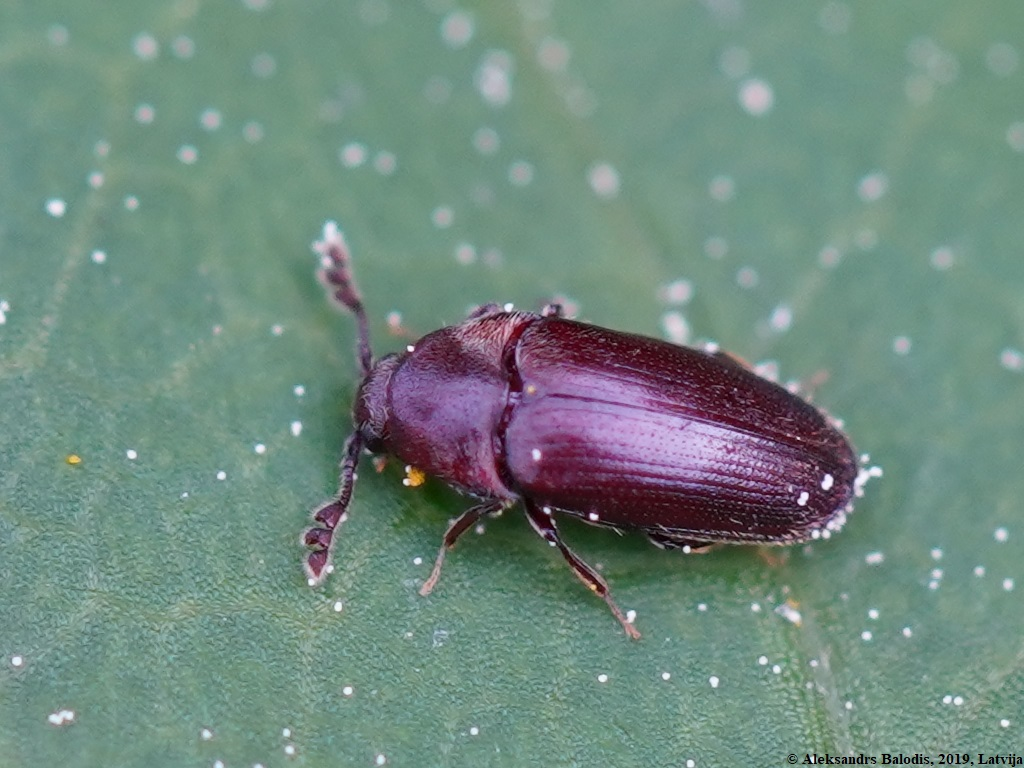
- Trixagus carinifrons

Scientific classification
- Kingdom: Animalia
- Phylum: Arthropoda
- Clade: Pancrustacea
- Class: Insecta
- Order: Coleoptera
- Suborder: Polyphaga
- Infraorder: Elateriformia
- Superfamily: Elateroidea
- Family: Throscidae; Laporte, 1840

= Throscidae =

Throscidae Temporal range: Barremian–Recent

Family of beetles

Throscidae is a family of elateroid beetles found worldwide (except New Zealand) with around 150 species in 5 extant genera. The larvae are soil-dwelling, siphoning fluid from mycorrhizae attached to trees. The adults are short-lived, with the adult males being noted for a complex mating dance. Like some other elateroids, they are capable of clicking.

== Genera ==
- Aulonothroscus Horn, 1890
- Cryptophthalma Cobos, 1982
- Pactopus LeConte, 1868
- Potergus Bonvouloir, 1871
- Trixagus Kugelann, 1794

=== Fossil genera ===
- †Jaira Muona 1993 Baltic amber, Eocene
- †Potergosoma Kovalev and Kirejtshuk 2013 Lebanese amber, Early Cretaceous (Barremian)
- †Rhomboaspis Kovalev and Kirejtshuk 2013 Lebanese amber, Barremian
- †Trixagosoma Li et al., 2020 Burmese amber, Myanmar, Late Cretaceous (Cenomanian)
- †Tyrannothroscus Muona 2019 Baltic amber, Eocene
- †Captopus Li, Huang & Cai, 2021 Burmese amber, Myanmar, Cenomanian
- †Electrothroscus Li, Huang & Cai, 2021 Burmese amber, Myanmar, Cenomanian
- †Pseudopactopus Li, Huang & Cai, 2021 Burmese amber, Myanmar, Cenomanian
