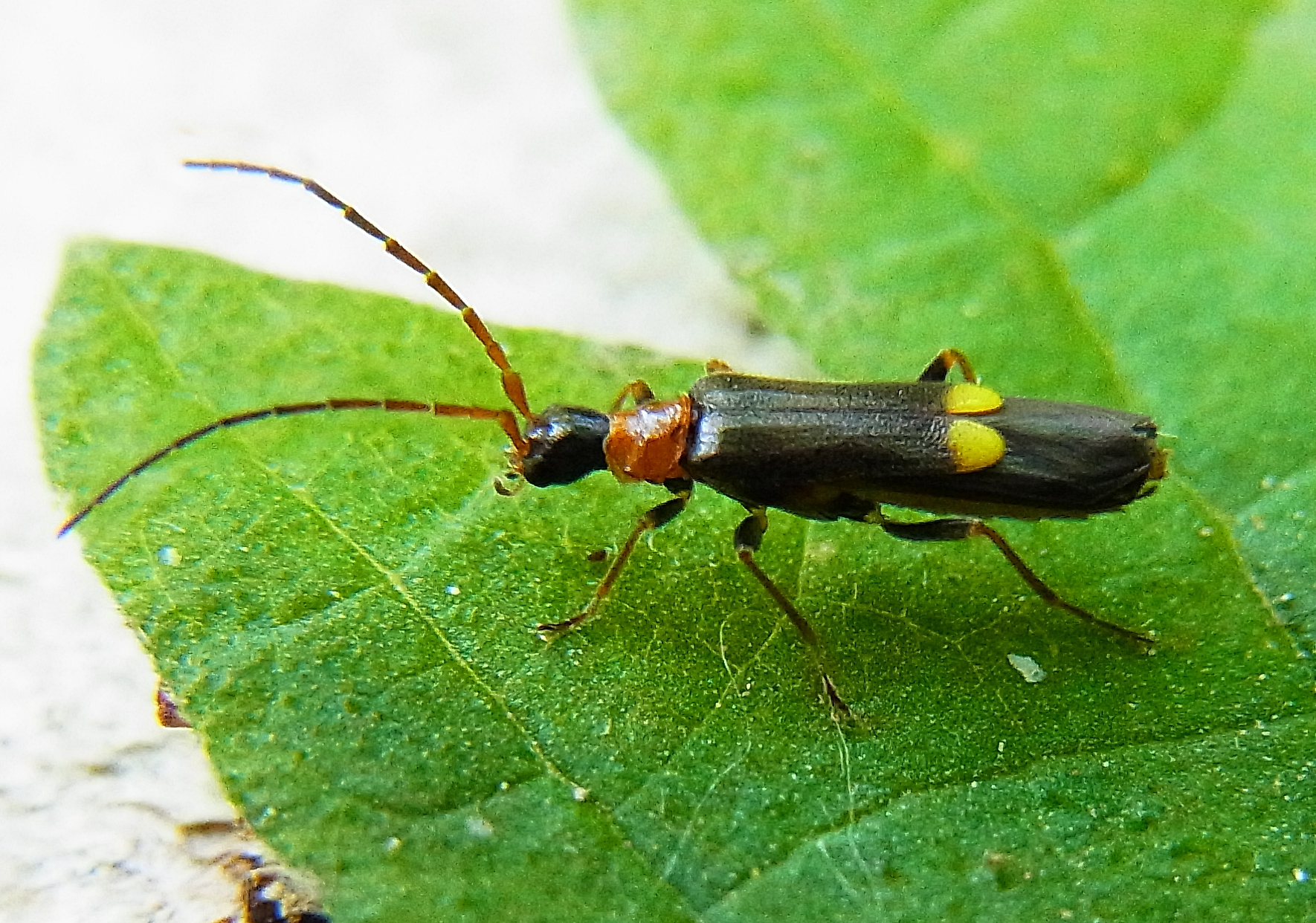
- Malthodes minimus in Hungary

Scientific classification
- Kingdom: Animalia
- Phylum: Arthropoda
- Clade: Pancrustacea
- Class: Insecta
- Order: Coleoptera
- Suborder: Polyphaga
- Infraorder: Elateriformia
- Family: Cantharidae
- Subfamily: Malthininae
- Genus: Malthodes; Kiesenwetter, 1852

= Malthodes =

Genus of beetles

Malthodes sp. (female)

Malthodes is a genus of soldier beetles in the family Cantharidae. There are at least 120 described species in the genus Malthodes.

== See also ==
- List of Malthodes species
