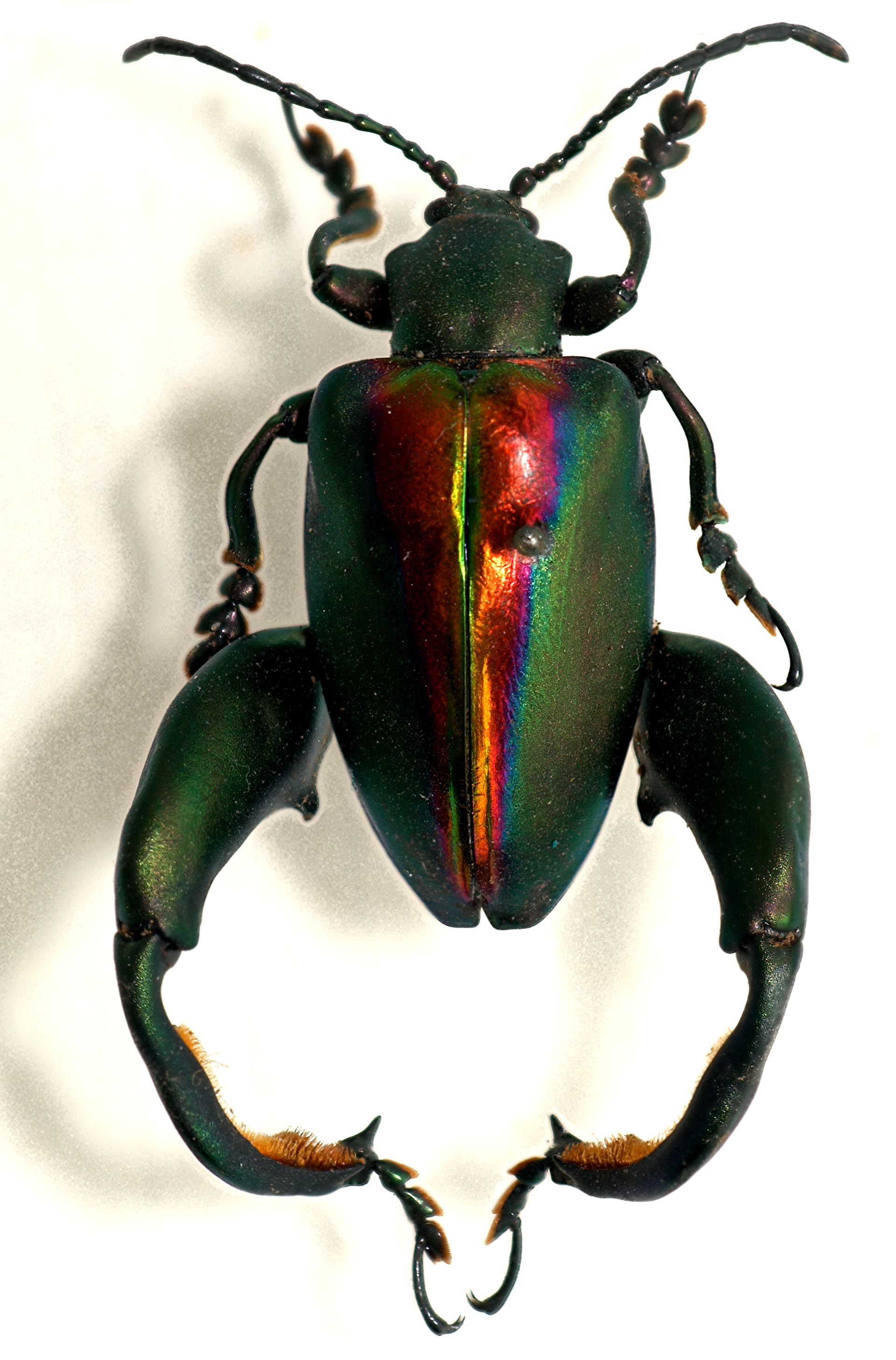
- Sagra buqueti

Scientific classification
- Kingdom: Animalia
- Phylum: Arthropoda
- Clade: Pancrustacea
- Class: Insecta
- Order: Coleoptera
- Suborder: Polyphaga
- Infraorder: Cucujiformia
- Family: Chrysomelidae
- Subfamily: Sagrinae; Leach, 1815

Tribes
- Carpophagini; Diaphanopsidini; Megamerini; Sagrini

= Sagrinae =

Sagrinae Temporal range: Paleocene–Recent

Subfamily of leaf beetles

Sagrinae, also known as frog-legged beetles or kangaroo beetles, are a subfamily of the leaf beetles (Chrysomelidae).

== Description ==
Beetles in this subfamily feature distinctive enlarged hindlegs, giving them their common names. While both males and females display enlarged hindlegs, the males' legs are significantly larger, a form of sexual dimorphism. Male beetles additionally have a large spine on the ventral sides of their hindlegs, used for grasping and removing rival males during competitions for access to females.

Other identifying features include deep sutural stria, a prognathous head without a median sulcus and with cruciform grooves, a narrow pronotum, and commonly deeply indented eyes. They also have functional wings that aren't used often.

Most beetles of the subfamily display bright colors, and some can grow to be 1 to 2 inches in length.

== Distribution and ecology ==
This subfamily is found in Asia and has been observed in Malaysia, Java, Sumatra, Borneo, and the Philippines. It prefers dense tropical jungles for its habitat. There is fossil evidence that suggests these beetles lived in North America and Europe during the Eocene.

== Reproduction ==
There is not much known about reproduction and development in this subfamily. However, species in this subfamily often sport large cocoons in the post-larval stage which are commonly found on vining plants.

The cocoons represent a symbiotic relationship with a type of bacteria called Enterobacteriaceae because the bacteria play a role in the construction of the cocoons. This bacterium also functions as an intracellular symbiont with this subfamily of beetle, and lives in four large blind sacs at the larval foregut. The bacteria provide much needed nutrients throughout the beetle's life cycle.

== Genera ==
Tribe Carpophagini :

Carpophagus MacLeay, 1827
Duboulaia Baly, 1871

Tribe Diaphanopsidini:

Diaphanops Schönherr, 1845

Tribe Megamerini:

Ametalla Hope, 1840
Atalasis Lacordaire, 1845
Coolgardica Blackburn, 1899
Mecynodera Hope, 1840
Megamerus MacLeay, 1827
Neodiaphanops Blackburn, 1899
Polyoptilus Germar, 1848
Pseudotoxotus Blackburn, 1889
†Palaeatalasis Legalov, 2021 – Green River Formation, Utah, Eocene (Ypresian)

Tribe Sagrini:

Sagra Fabricius, 1792

Incertae sedis:

†Eosagra Haupt, 1950 – Geiseltal, Germany, Middle Eocene
†Gallopsis Legalov, Kirejtshuk & Nel, 2019 – Menat Formation, France, Middle Paleocene
†Pulchritudo Krell & Vitali, 2021 – Green River Formation, Colorado, Eocene (Ypresian)
