= Carpophagini =

Scientific classification
- Kingdom: Animalia
- Phylum: Arthropoda
- Clade: Pancrustacea
- Class: Insecta
- Order: Coleoptera
- Suborder: Polyphaga
- Infraorder: Cucujiformia
- Family: Chrysomelidae
- Subfamily: Sagrinae
- Tribe: Carpophagini; Chapuis, 1874

Type genus
- Carpophagus MacLeay, 1827

Tribe of leaf beetles

Carpophagini is a tribe of frog-legged leaf beetles in the family Chrysomelidae endemic to Australia. It was established by the Belgian entomologist Félicien Chapuis in 1874, with the genus Carpophagus designated as its type genus.

== Genera ==
The tribe contains two genera:

- Carpophagus MacLeay, 1827 – Australia
- Duboulaia Baly, 1871 – Western Australia
