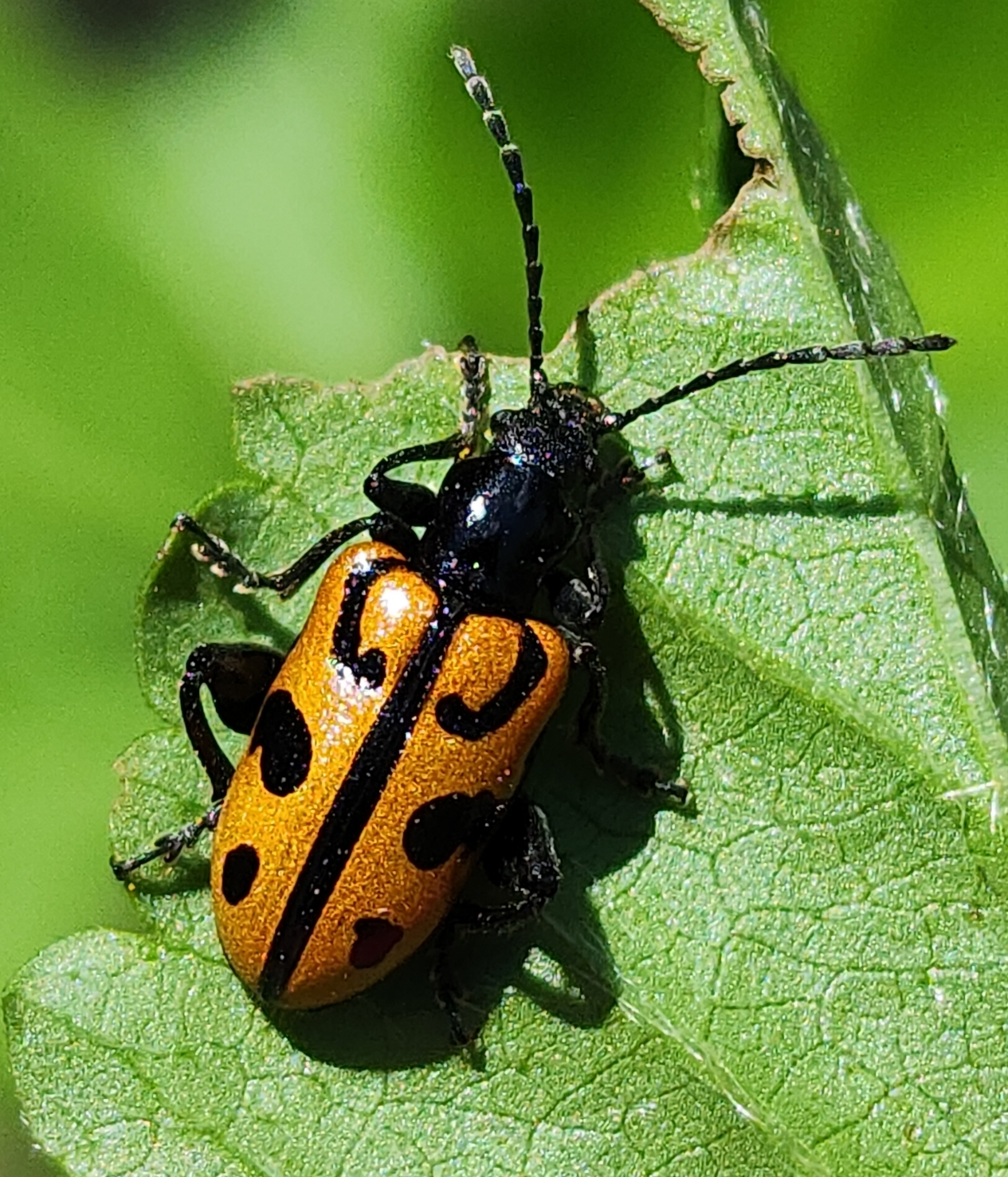
- Atalasis sagroides

Scientific classification
- Kingdom: Animalia
- Phylum: Arthropoda
- Clade: Pancrustacea
- Class: Insecta
- Order: Coleoptera
- Suborder: Polyphaga
- Infraorder: Cucujiformia
- Family: Chrysomelidae
- Subfamily: Sagrinae
- Tribe: Megamerini; Chapuis, 1874

= Megamerini =

Tribe of leaf beetles

Megamerini is a tribe of frog-legged leaf beetles found in Australasia, Madagascar and South America.

== Genera ==
The following 10 genera are placed in Megamerini:

- Ametalla Hope, 1841 - southwestern Australia
- Atalasis Lacordaire, 1845 - Argentina
- Coolgardica Blackburn, 1899 - Australia
- Mecynodera Hope, 1841 - eastern Australia and Papua New Guinea
- Megamerus MacLeay, 1827 (type genus) - Australia, Madagascar and Brazil
- Neodiaphanops Blackburn, 1899 - Australia
- Polyoptilus Germar, 1848 - Australia
- Pseudotoxotus Blackburn, 1889 - northern Australia
- †Palaeatalasis Legalov, 2021
