= Diaphanops =

Scientific classification
- Kingdom: Animalia
- Phylum: Arthropoda
- Clade: Pancrustacea
- Class: Insecta
- Order: Coleoptera
- Suborder: Polyphaga
- Infraorder: Cucujiformia
- Family: Chrysomelidae
- Tribe: Diaphanopsidini; Monrós, 1958
- Genus: Diaphanops; Schönherr, 1845
- Species: D. westermanni

Binomial name
- Diaphanops westermanni Boheman, 1845

Synonyms
- Diaphanops meyricki Blackburn, 1889; Diaphanops parallelus Blackburn, 1889; Diaphanops curculionoides Lacordaire, 1845

Species of leaf beetle

Diaphanops is a monotypic genus of frog-legged leaf beetles (family Chrysomelidae). Its only known species is Diaphanops westermanni, found in Western Australia. It is the only genus in the tribe Diaphanopsidini.
