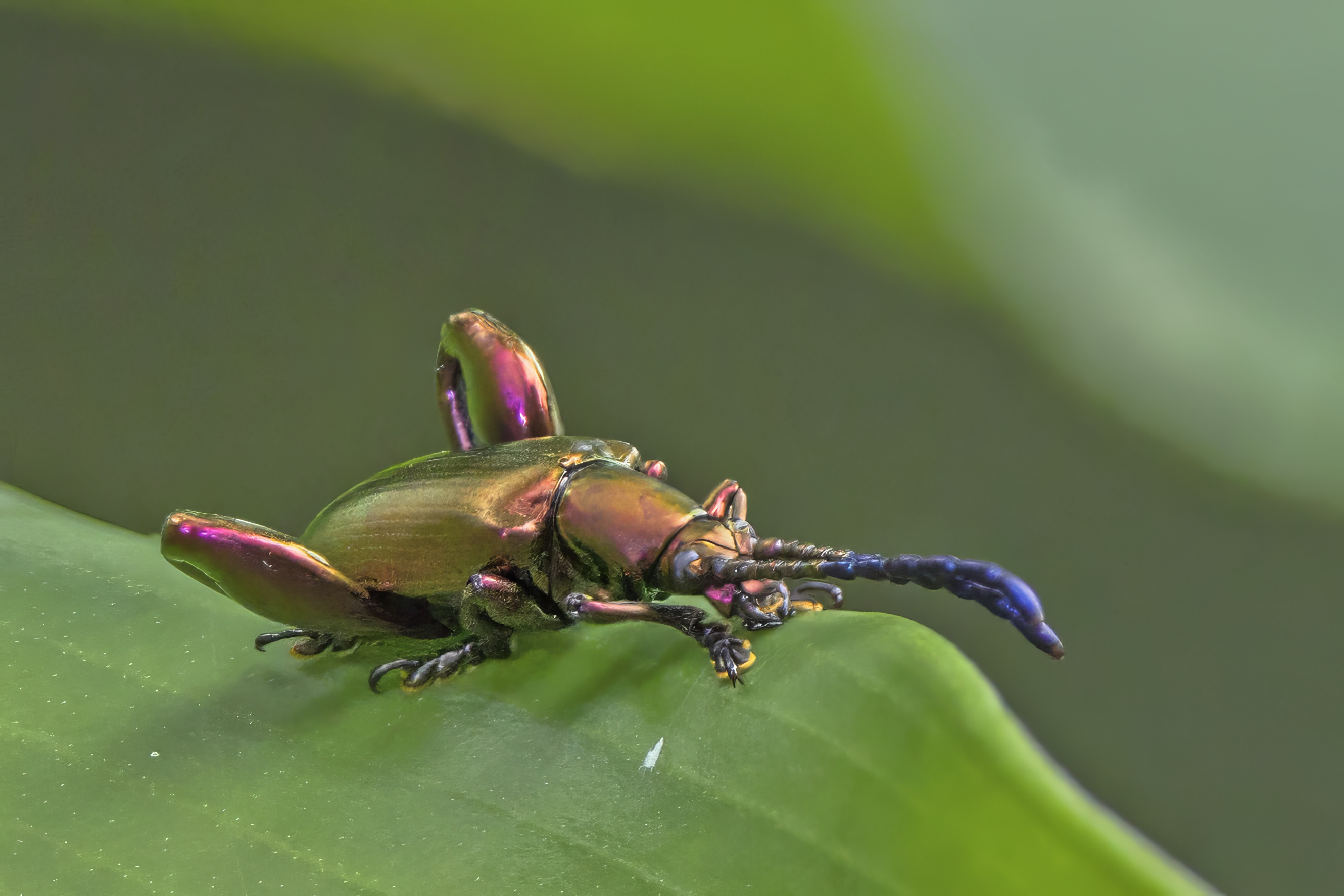
- Sagra sp. from Ghana

Scientific classification
- Kingdom: Animalia
- Phylum: Arthropoda
- Clade: Pancrustacea
- Class: Insecta
- Order: Coleoptera
- Suborder: Polyphaga
- Infraorder: Cucujiformia
- Family: Chrysomelidae
- Subfamily: Sagrinae
- Tribe: Sagrini; Leach, 1815
- Genus: Sagra; Fabricius, 1792

Synonyms
- Sagrania Rafinesque, 1815; Tinosagra Weise, 1905; Orthosagra Crowson, 1946; Prosagra Crowson, 1946; Sagrina Crowson, 1946; Sagrinola Monrós & Bechyné, 1956

= Sagra (beetle) =

Genus of leaf beetles

Sagra is a genus of frog-legged leaf beetles (family Chrysomelidae) placed in the monotypic tribe Sagrini. Members of this genus are found in Africa, Asia, and Australia (including New Guinea).

== List of species ==
The genus includes the following species:

- Sagra adonis Lacordaire, 1845 – Guinea
- Sagra amethystina Guérin-Méneville, 1844 – western Africa, South Africa
- Sagra bicolor Lacordaire, 1845 – tropical Africa
- Sagra buqueti Lesson, 1831 – Indonesia, Malaysia and Philippines
- Sagra carbunculus Hope, 1842 – Northeast India, Nepal, Myanmar (?)
- Sagra coeruleata Lacordaire, 1845 – Madagascar
- Sagra congoana Clavareau, 1916 – DR Congo, Angola
- Sagra cyanea Dalman, 1823 – Sierra Leone
- Sagra diversepunctata Pic, 1938 – Ivory Coast
- Sagra dohrni Baly, 1860 – Guinea
- Sagra femorata (Drury, 1773) – tropical Asia from India to Australia
- Sagra ferox Baly, 1877 – eastern Africa
- Sagra fulgida Weber, 1801 – Southern China, Myanmar, Laos, Thailand and Vietnam
- Sagra galinieri Lacordaire, 1845 – eastern Africa
- Sagra haefligeri Weise, 1905 – Tanzania
- Sagra hayekae David, 1954 – Kenya
- Sagra humeralis Jacoby, 1904 – China (Guizhou, Yunnan and Zheijing)
- Sagra jansoni Baly, 1860 – China (Yunnan), India, Laos, Myanmar, Thailand and Vietnam
- Sagra javeti Baly, 1860 – South Africa
- Sagra johnstoni Gahan, 1893 – Malawi
- Sagra livingstonii Baly, 1864 – Zambesi River
- Sagra moghanii Chen & Pu, 1962 – China (Yunnan)
- Sagra mouhoti Baly, 1862 – Cambodia, China (Yunnan), Myanmar, Laos, Thailand and Vietnam
- Sagra murrayi Baly, 1860 – eastern Africa
- Sagra odontopus Gistel, 1831 – Cambodia, China (Guangdong, Yunnan), Indonesia (Sumatra, Java), Laos, Malaysia, Myanmar, Nepal, Thailand and Vietnam
- Sagra rugulipennis Weise, 1901 – New Guinea
- Sagra senegalensis Klug, 1835 – Senegal, eastern Africa
- Sagra tristis Fabricius, 1798 – Guinea, Angola, Congo, Tanzania
- Sagra violacea (Olivier, 1789) – western Africa, Somalia, Kenya, Chad, Uganda, Cameroon
