= Sagra carbunculus =

Scientific classification
- Kingdom: Animalia
- Phylum: Arthropoda
- Clade: Pancrustacea
- Class: Insecta
- Order: Coleoptera
- Suborder: Polyphaga
- Infraorder: Cucujiformia
- Family: Chrysomelidae
- Genus: Sagra
- Species: S. carbunculus

Binomial name
- Sagra carbunculus Hope, 1842

Species of beetles

Sagra carbunculus is a species of beetle in the leaf beetle family (Chrysomelidae) found in South Asia as well as possibly Southeast Asia. The scientific name of the species was published in 1842 by Frederick William Hope.

== Distribution ==
S. carbunculus is found in north and northeast India, Nepal and possibly Myanmar, and seems to be restricted to the Himalayas and connected ranges in Myanmar. It has also been recorded from Laos, Cambodia and China, but these records have not been confirmed or may actually refer to other species such as Sagra odontopus.
