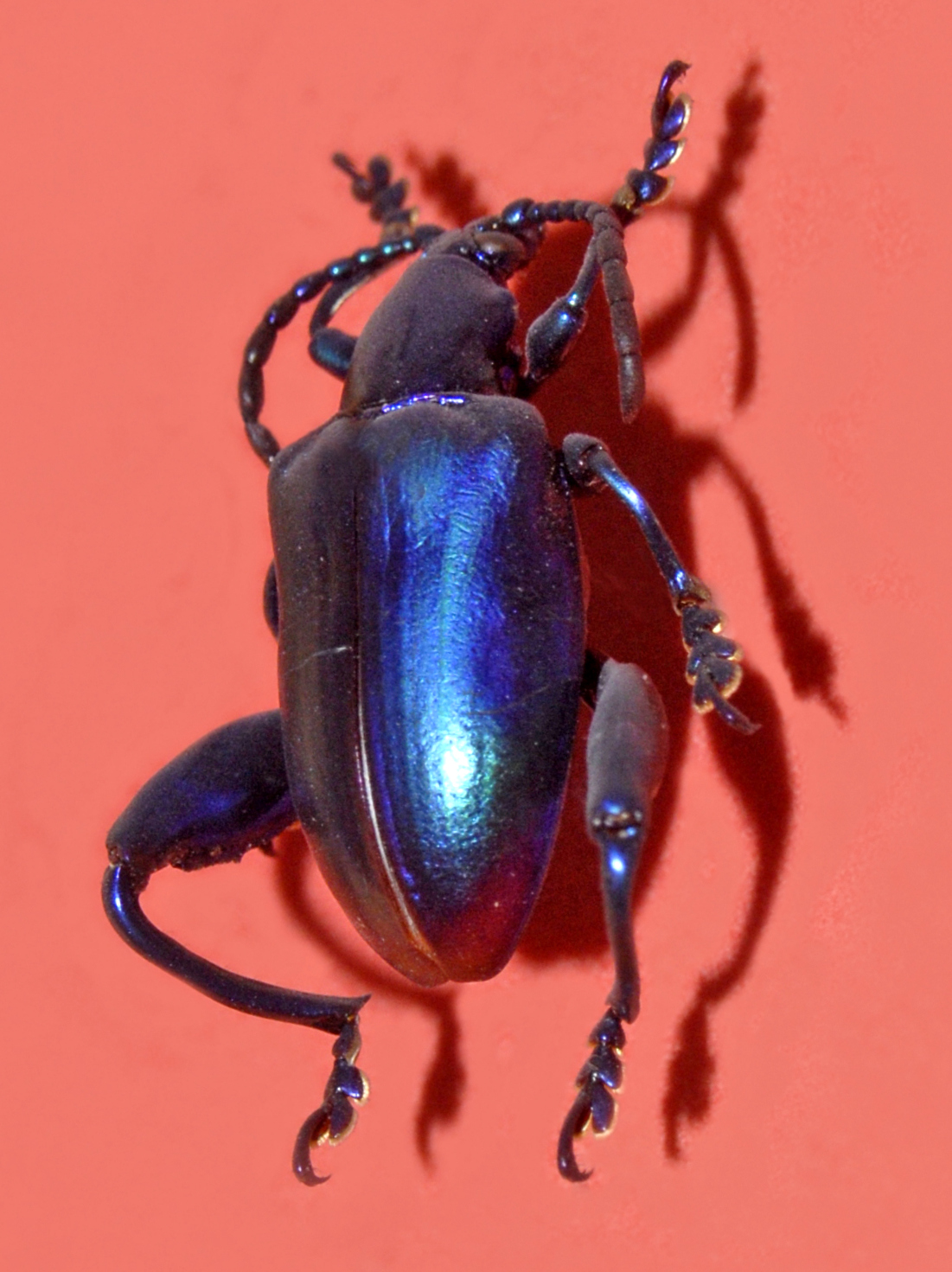
- Museum specimen of Sagra femorata
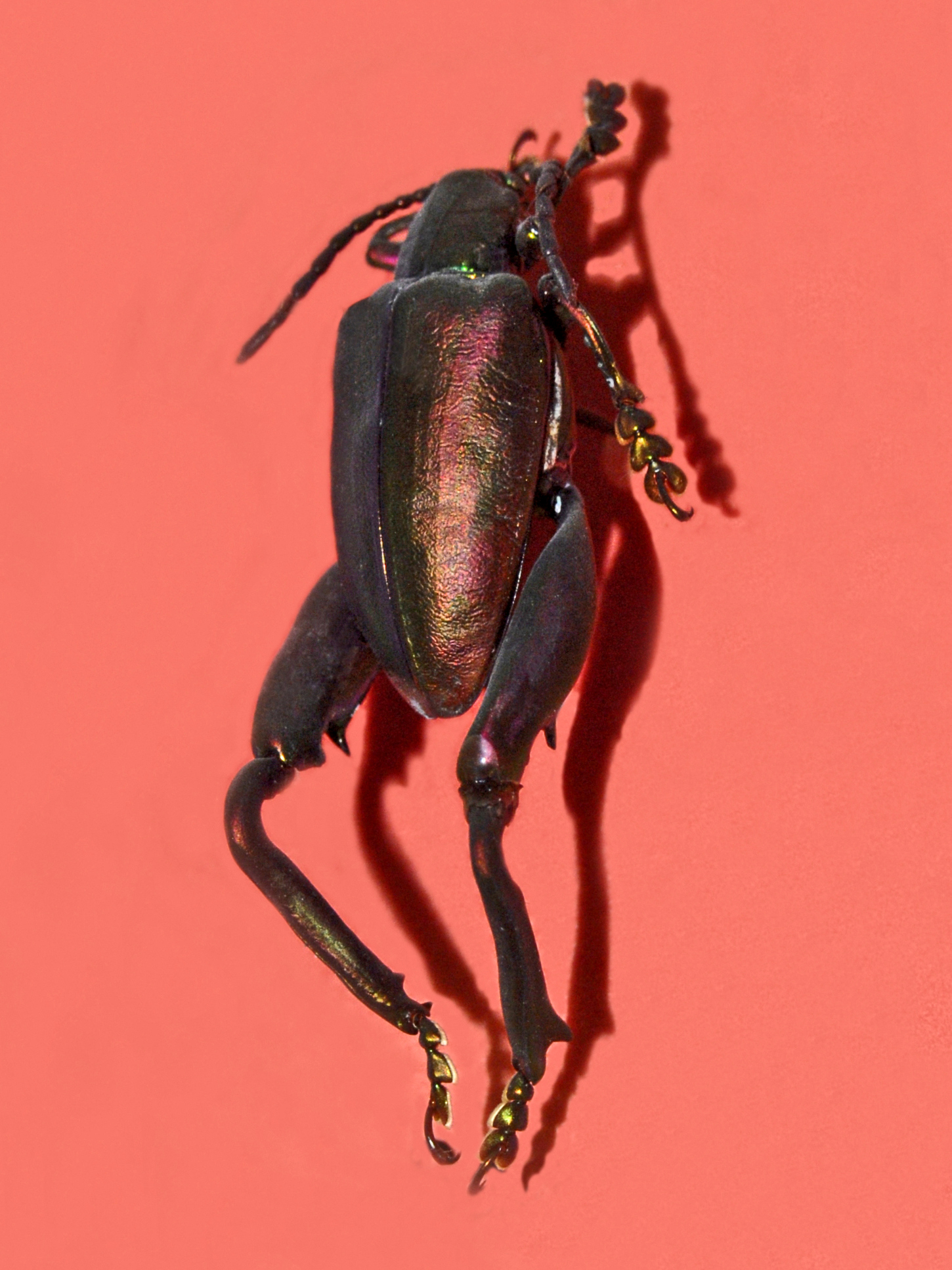
- Museum specimen of Sagra pupurea (= Sagra femorata)

Scientific classification
- Kingdom: Animalia
- Phylum: Arthropoda
- Clade: Pancrustacea
- Class: Insecta
- Order: Coleoptera
- Suborder: Polyphaga
- Infraorder: Cucujiformia
- Family: Chrysomelidae
- Tribe: Sagrini
- Genus: Sagra
- Species: S. femorata

Binomial name
- Sagra femorata (Drury, 1773)

Synonyms
- List: Tenebrio femoratus Drury, 1773; Tenebrio viridis Sulzer, 1776; Alurnus dentipes Fabricius, 1787; Sagra purpurea Lichtenstein, 1796; Sagra splendida Weber, 1801; Sagra tridentata Weber, 1801; Sagra aenea Olivier, 1807; Sagra nigrita Olivier, 1807; Sagra empyrea Lacordaire, 1845; Sagra druryi Lacordaire, 1845; Sagra chrysochlora Lacordaire, 1845; Sagra festiva Lacordaire, 1845 (unavailable); Sagra longicollis Lacordaire, 1845; Sagra speciosa Lacordaire, 1845; Sagra superba Lacordaire, 1845; Sagra quadraticollis Lacordaire, 1845; Sagra ignita Lacordaire, 1845; Sagra formosa Lacordaire, 1845; Sagra heterodera Lacordaire, 1845; Sagra weberi Lacordaire, 1845; Sagra fabricii Lacordaire, 1845; Sagra pfeifferi Baly, 1860; Sagra mutabilis Baly, 1864; Sagra longipes Baly, 1878; Sagra puncticollis Jacoby, 1884; Sagra brevipes Jacoby, 1889; Sagra papuana Jacoby, 1889; Sagra abdominalis Jacoby, 1895; Sagra borneoensis Jacoby, 1898; Sagra speciosa var. olivieri Weise, 1913; Sagra femorata tonkinensis Kuntzen, 1914; Sagra queenslandica Mjöberg, 1917; Sagra femorata andamanensis Jolivet, 1951; Sagra purpurea var. atricolor Pic, 1953; Sagra purpurea var. jeanvoinei Pic, 1953

= Sagra femorata =

Species of leaf beetle

Sagra femorata is a species of beetle belonging to the family Chrysomelidae.

== Description ==
Sagra femorata can reach a length of 20 mm (0.79 in). These beetles have a striking sexual dimorphism. The males are much larger and have very long and strong hind legs resembling that of frogs (hence the common name). This remarkable morphology helps the males to dominate the opponents during the breeding. The basic color is quite variable, but usually it is metallic blue-green.

== Distribution ==
This species can be found in the forests of Cambodia, China, India, Java, Laos, Myanmar, Sri Lanka, Thailand and Vietnam.
