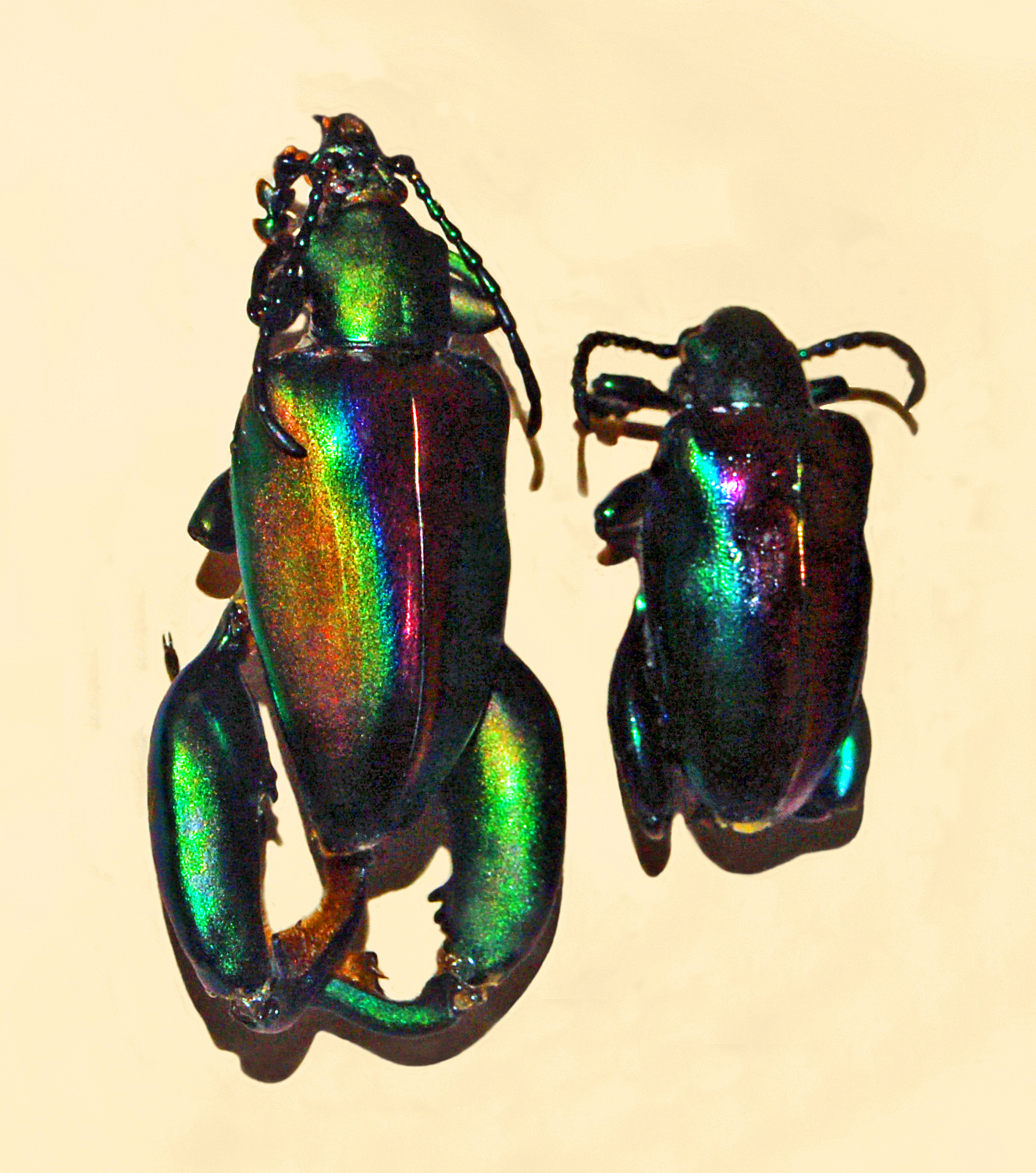
- Sagra buqueti from Nias Island. Male and female.

Scientific classification
- Kingdom: Animalia
- Phylum: Arthropoda
- Clade: Pancrustacea
- Class: Insecta
- Order: Coleoptera
- Suborder: Polyphaga
- Infraorder: Cucujiformia
- Family: Chrysomelidae
- Tribe: Sagrini
- Genus: Sagra
- Species: S. buqueti

Binomial name
- Sagra buqueti Lesson, 1831

= Sagra buqueti =

Species of leaf beetle

Sagra buqueti is a species of beetle belonging to the family Chrysomelidae.

== Description ==
S. buqueti can reach a length of 25–50 mm (0.98–1.97 in). These iridescent, colorful beetles have a striking sexual dimorphism. The males are much larger and have very long and strong hind legs (hence the common name frog beetle). The basic color is metallic green, with reddish and golden reflections on the elytra. Cocoons of this species can be found in the jungle on climbing vines, specifically kudzu. They have also been captive reared at the Berlin Zoo on sweet potato.

== Distribution ==
This species can be found in Thailand, Vietnam, Indonesia, Malaysia and India.

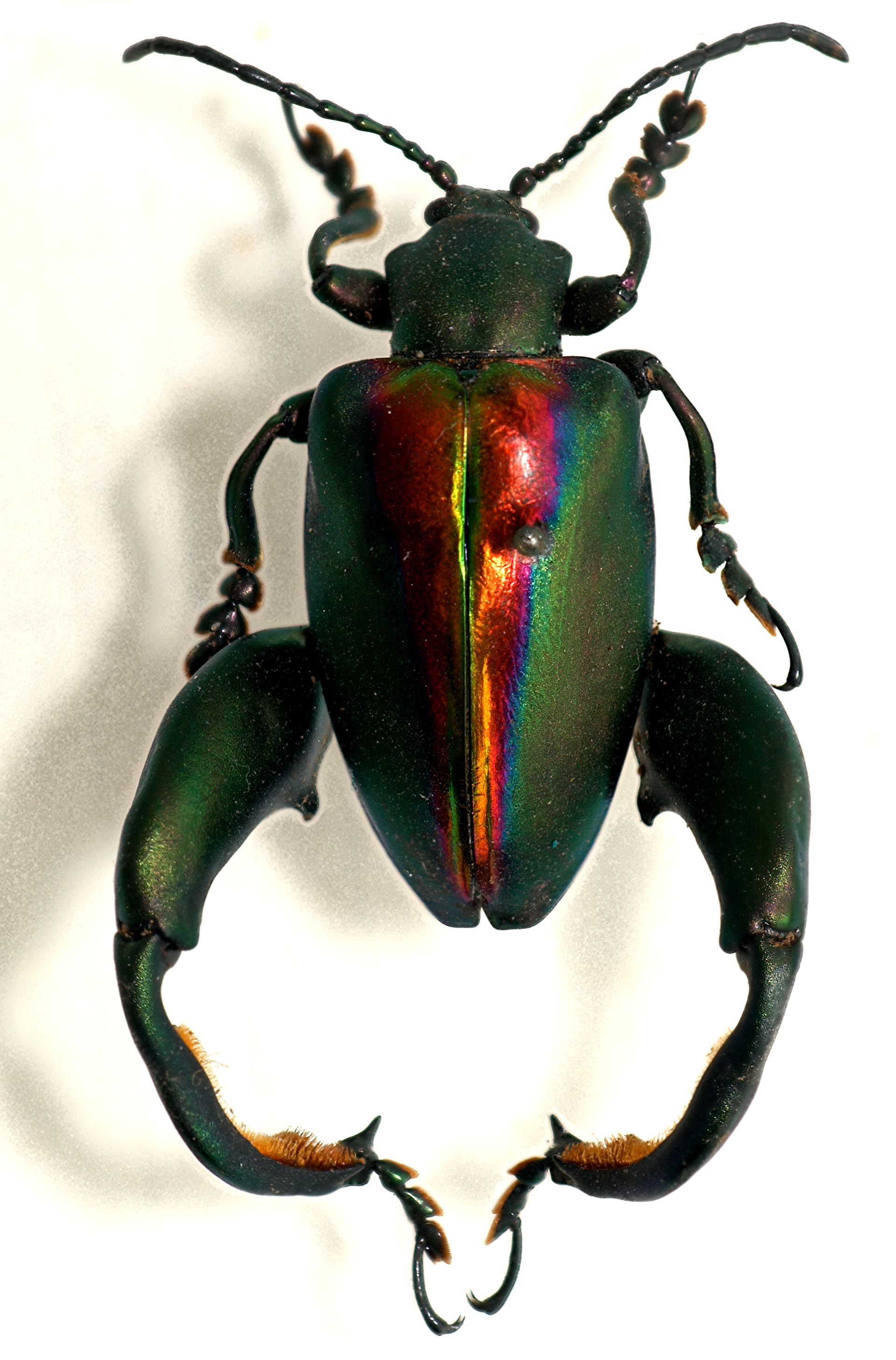
Sagra buqueti mounted male specimen.
