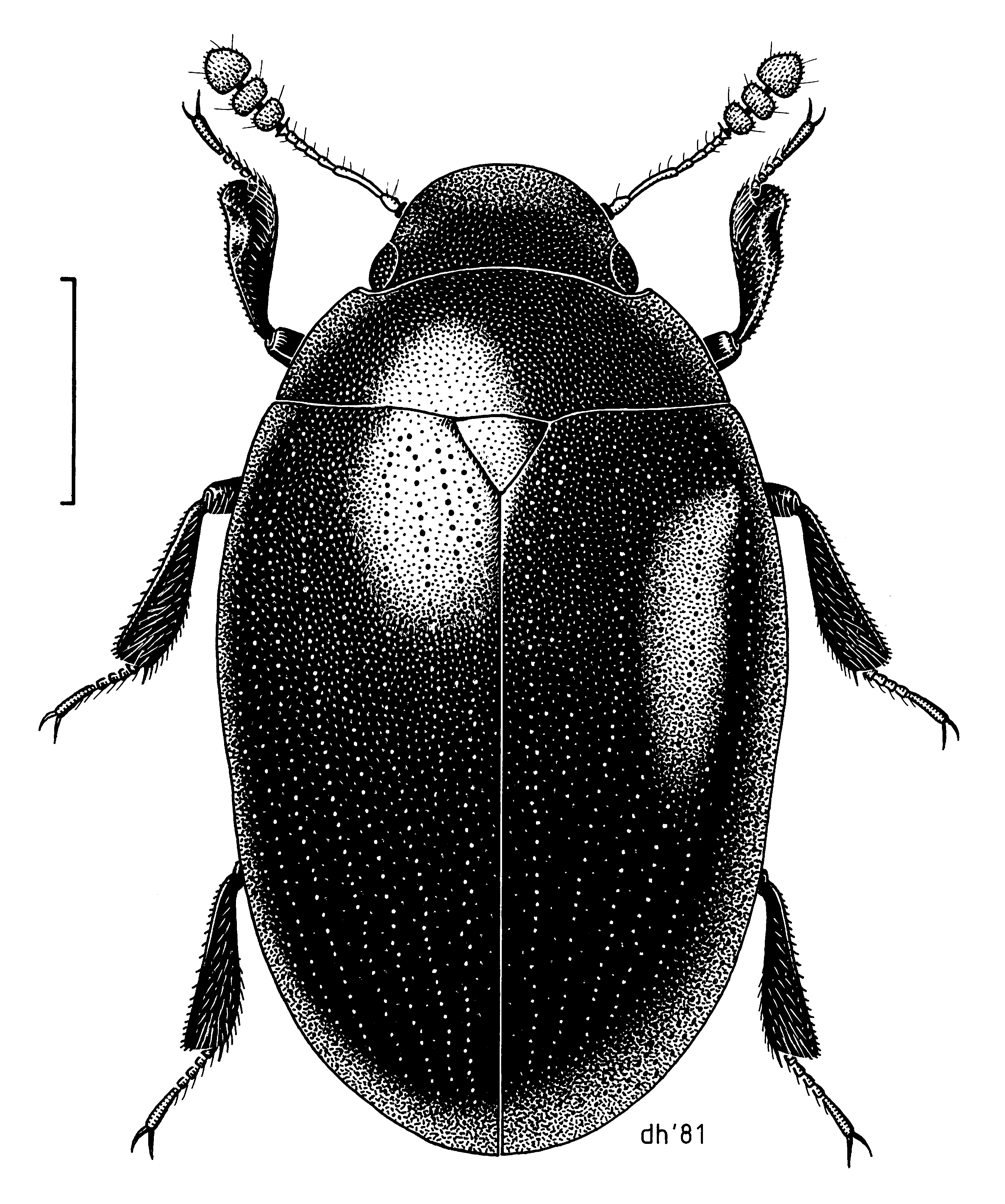
- Nosodendron zealandicum

Scientific classification
- Kingdom: Animalia
- Phylum: Arthropoda
- Clade: Pancrustacea
- Class: Insecta
- Order: Coleoptera
- Suborder: Polyphaga
- Family: Nosodendridae; Erichson, 1846

Genera
- See text

= Nosodendridae =

Nosodendridae Temporal range: Cenomanian–Present

Family of beetles

Nosodendridae is a family of beetles, with less than a hundred species in three extant genera, which are found worldwide. Nosodendron, the largest genus, is found in forests and attracted to yeast generated slime on the wounds of trees, and likely consumes fermented substances as well as fungi and microorganisms. Several additional genera and species are known from the fossil record. Nosodendridae is considered to be an isolated lineage within Polyphaga, being the sister group to the clade containing Staphyliniformia, Bostrichoidea and Cucujiformia.

== Genera and species ==
†Basinosa Tihelka, Huang & Cai, 2020

- †B. pengweii Tihelka, Huang & Cai, 2020 (Cenomanian; Burmese amber, Myanmar)

†Mesonosa Tihelka et al., 2021

- †M. scandens Tihelka et al., 2021 (Cenomanian; Burmese amber, Myanmar)

Nosodendron Latreille, 1804

- Nd. africanum Endrödy-Younga, 1989
- Nd. agaboides Champion, 1923
- Nd. angelum Reichardt, 1973
- Nd. asiaticum Lewis, 1889
- Nd. australe Fauvel, 1903
- Nd. australicum Lea, 1931
- Nd. batchianum Champion, 1923
- Nd. bilyi Háva, 2000
- Nd. boliviense Háva, 2005
- Nd. bucki Jorge, 1973
- Nd. californicum Horn, 1874
- Nd. calvum (Tryon, 1892)
- Nd. celebense Champion, 1923
- Nd. ceylanicum Motschulsky, 1863
- Nd. chelonarium Joly, 1991
- Nd. coenosum (Wollaston, 1873)
- Nd. derasum Sharp, 1902
- Nd. disjectum Champion, 1923
- Nd. dybasi Reichardt, 1976
- Nd. elongatum Endrödy-Younga, 1991
- Nd. fasciatum Joly, 1991
- Nd. fasciculare (Olivier, 1790)
- Nd. fijiense Lea, 1931
- Nd. glabratum Champion, 1923
- Nd. grande (Reitter, 1881)
- Nd. hageni (Reitter, 1886)
- Nd. helferi Háva, 2000
- Nd. hispidum Champion, 1923
- Nd. horaki Háva, 2000
- Nd. incognitum Háva, 2005
- Nd. indicum Pic, 1923
- Nd. interruptum Lea, 1931
- Nd. jakli Háva, 2005
- Nd. kalimantanus Háva, 2005
- Nd. laosense Háva, 2007
- Nd. latifrons Sharp, 1902
- Nd. latum Endrödy-Younga, 1991
- Nd. leechi Reichardt, 1976
- Nd. lentum Oehme-Leonhardt, 1954
- Nd. madagascariense Alluaud, 1896
- Nd. manuselae Háva, 2008
- Nd. marginatum (Reitter, 1886)
- Nd. mediobasale Lea, 1931
- Nd. mexicanum Sharp, 1902
- Nd. moluccense Háva, 2008
- Nd. nepalense Háva & Farkač, 2003
- Nd. niasense Háva, 2005
- Nd. nitidum Champion, 1923
- Nd. nomurai Háva, 2000
- Nd. oblongum Champion, 1923
- Nd. ovatum Broun, 1880
- Nd. pauliani Endrödy-Younga, 1991
- Nd. politum Sharp, 1902
- Nd. prudeki Háva, 2000
- Nd. punctatostriatum Chevrolat, 1864
- Nd. punctulatum (Reitter, 1886)
- Nd. reichardti Joly, 1991
- Nd. ritsemae (Reitter, 1886)
- Nd. sikkimense Champion, 1923
- Nd. slipinskii Endrödy-Younga, 1991
- Nd. strigiferum Champion, 1923
- Nd. subtile Sharp, 1902
- Nd. testudinum Waterhouse, 1876
- Nd. thompsoni Reichardt, 1976
- Nd. tiomanense Háva, 2006
- Nd. tonkineum Pic, 1923
- Nd. tritavum Scudder, 1890
- Nd. unicolor Say, 1824
- Nd. vestitum (Tryon, 1892)
- Nd. zealandicum Sharp, 1886

Nosoglobulus (Háva, 2003)

- Ng. loebli (Háva, 2003)
- Ng. smetanai (Háva, 2003)

Nosotetocus Scudder, 1892

- Nt. debilis Scudder, 1900
- Nt. marcovi Scudder, 1892
- Nt. vespertinus Scudder, 1900
