= Nosodendron californicum =

Scientific classification
- Kingdom: Animalia
- Phylum: Arthropoda
- Clade: Pancrustacea
- Class: Insecta
- Order: Coleoptera
- Suborder: Polyphaga
- Family: Nosodendridae
- Genus: Nosodendron
- Species: N. californicum

Binomial name
- Nosodendron californicum Horn, 1874

Species of beetle

Nosodendron californicum is a species of wounded-tree beetle in the family Nosodendridae. It is found in Central America and North America.
