= Nosodendron unicolor =

Scientific classification
- Kingdom: Animalia
- Phylum: Arthropoda
- Clade: Pancrustacea
- Class: Insecta
- Order: Coleoptera
- Suborder: Polyphaga
- Family: Nosodendridae
- Genus: Nosodendron
- Species: N. unicolor

Binomial name
- Nosodendron unicolor Say, 1824

Species of beetle

Nosodendron unicolor, the slime flux beetle, is a species of wounded-tree beetle in the family Nosodendridae. It is found in North America.
