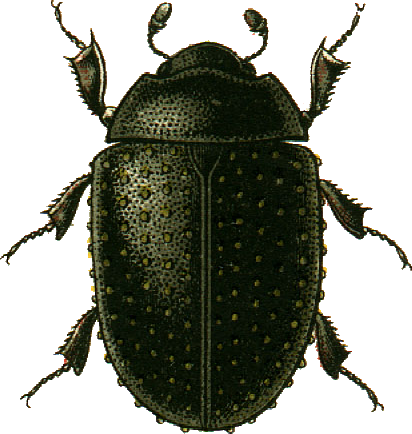
- Nosodendron fasciculare

Scientific classification
- Kingdom: Animalia
- Phylum: Arthropoda
- Class: Insecta
- Order: Coleoptera
- Suborder: Polyphaga
- Family: Nosodendridae
- Genus: Nosodendron; Latreille, 1804

Subgenera
- Nosodendron (Nosodendron) Latreille, 1804; Nosodendron (Nosoglobulus) Háva, 2003

= Nosodendron =

Genus of beetles

Nosodendron is a genus of wounded-tree beetles in the family Nosodendridae. There are more than 70 described species in Nosodendron.

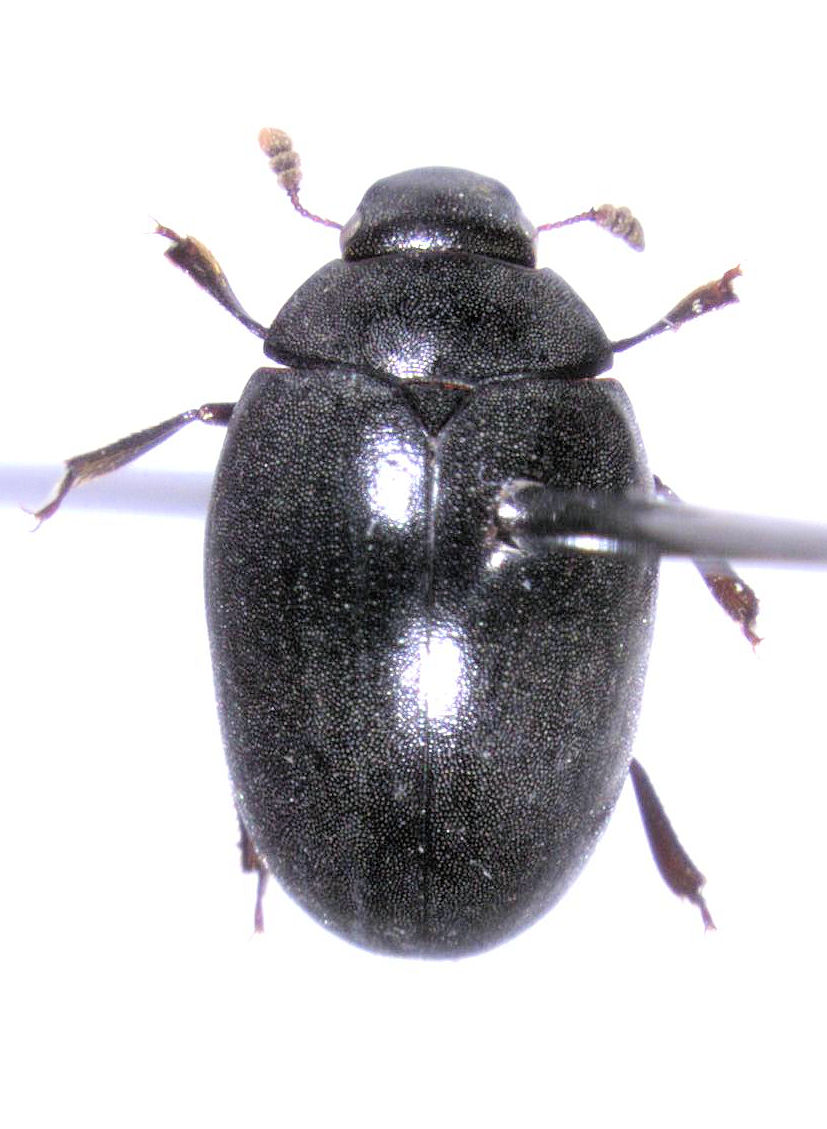
Nosodendron zealandicum

== Species ==
These 73 species belong to the genus Nosodendron:

- Nosodendron africanum Endrödy-Younga, 1989
- Nosodendron agaboides Champion, 1923
- Nosodendron angelum Reichardt, 1973
- Nosodendron asiaticum Lewis, 1889
- Nosodendron australe Fauvel, 1903
- Nosodendron australicum Lea, 1931
- Nosodendron batchianum Champion, 1923
- Nosodendron bilyi Háva, 2000
- Nosodendron boliviense Háva, 2005
- Nosodendron bucki Jorge, 1973
- Nosodendron californicum Horn, 1874
- Nosodendron calvum (Tryon, 1892)
- Nosodendron carolinense Yoshitomi, 2013
- Nosodendron celebense Champion, 1923
- Nosodendron ceylanicum Motschulsky, 1863
- Nosodendron chelonarium Joly, 1991
- Nosodendron coenosum (Wollaston, 1873)
- Nosodendron derasum Sharp, 1902
- Nosodendron disjectum Champion, 1923
- Nosodendron dybasi Reichardt, 1976
- Nosodendron elongatum Endrödy-Younga, 1991
- Nosodendron fasciatum Joly, 1991
- Nosodendron fasciculare (Olivier, 1790)
- Nosodendron fijiense Lea, 1931
- Nosodendron glabratum Champion, 1923
- Nosodendron grande (Reitter, 1881)
- Nosodendron hageni (Reitter, 1886)
- Nosodendron helferi Háva, 2000
- Nosodendron hispidum Champion, 1923
- Nosodendron horaki Háva, 2000
- Nosodendron incognitum Háva, 2005
- Nosodendron indicum Pic, 1923
- Nosodendron interruptum Lea, 1931
- Nosodendron jakli Háva, 2005
- Nosodendron jirii Hava, 2011
- Nosodendron kalimantanus Háva, 2005
- Nosodendron latifrons Sharp, 1902
- Nosodendron latum Endrödy-Younga, 1991
- Nosodendron leechi Reichardt, 1976
- Nosodendron lentum Oehme-Leonhardt, 1954
- Nosodendron loebli Háva, 2003
- Nosodendron madagascariense Alluaud, 1896
- Nosodendron marginatum (Reitter, 1886)
- Nosodendron mediobasale Lea, 1931
- Nosodendron mexicanum Sharp, 1902
- Nosodendron nepalense Háva & Farkac, 2003
- Nosodendron niasense Háva, 2005
- Nosodendron nitidum Champion, 1923
- Nosodendron nomurai Háva, 2000
- Nosodendron oblongum Champion, 1923
- Nosodendron ogasawaraense Yoshitomi, Kishimoto & Lee, 2015
- Nosodendron ovatum Broun, 1880
- Nosodendron pauliani Endrödy-Younga, 1991
- Nosodendron politum Sharp, 1902
- Nosodendron prudeki Háva, 2000
- Nosodendron punctatostriatum Chevrolat, 1864
- Nosodendron punctulatum (Reitter, 1886)
- Nosodendron reichardti Joly, 1991
- Nosodendron ritsemae (Reitter, 1886)
- Nosodendron sikkimense Champion, 1923
- Nosodendron slipinskii Endrödy-Younga, 1991
- Nosodendron smetanai Háva, 2003
- Nosodendron strigiferum Champion, 1923
- Nosodendron subtile Sharp, 1902
- Nosodendron taiwanense Yoshitomi, Kishimoto & Lee, 2015
- Nosodendron testudinum Waterhouse, 1876
- Nosodendron thompsoni Reichardt, 1976
- Nosodendron tiomanense Háva, 2006
- Nosodendron tonkineum Pic, 1923
- Nosodendron tritavum Scudder, 1890
- Nosodendron unicolor Say, 1824 (slime flux beetle)
- Nosodendron vestitum (Tryon, 1892)
- Nosodendron zealandicum Sharp, 1882
