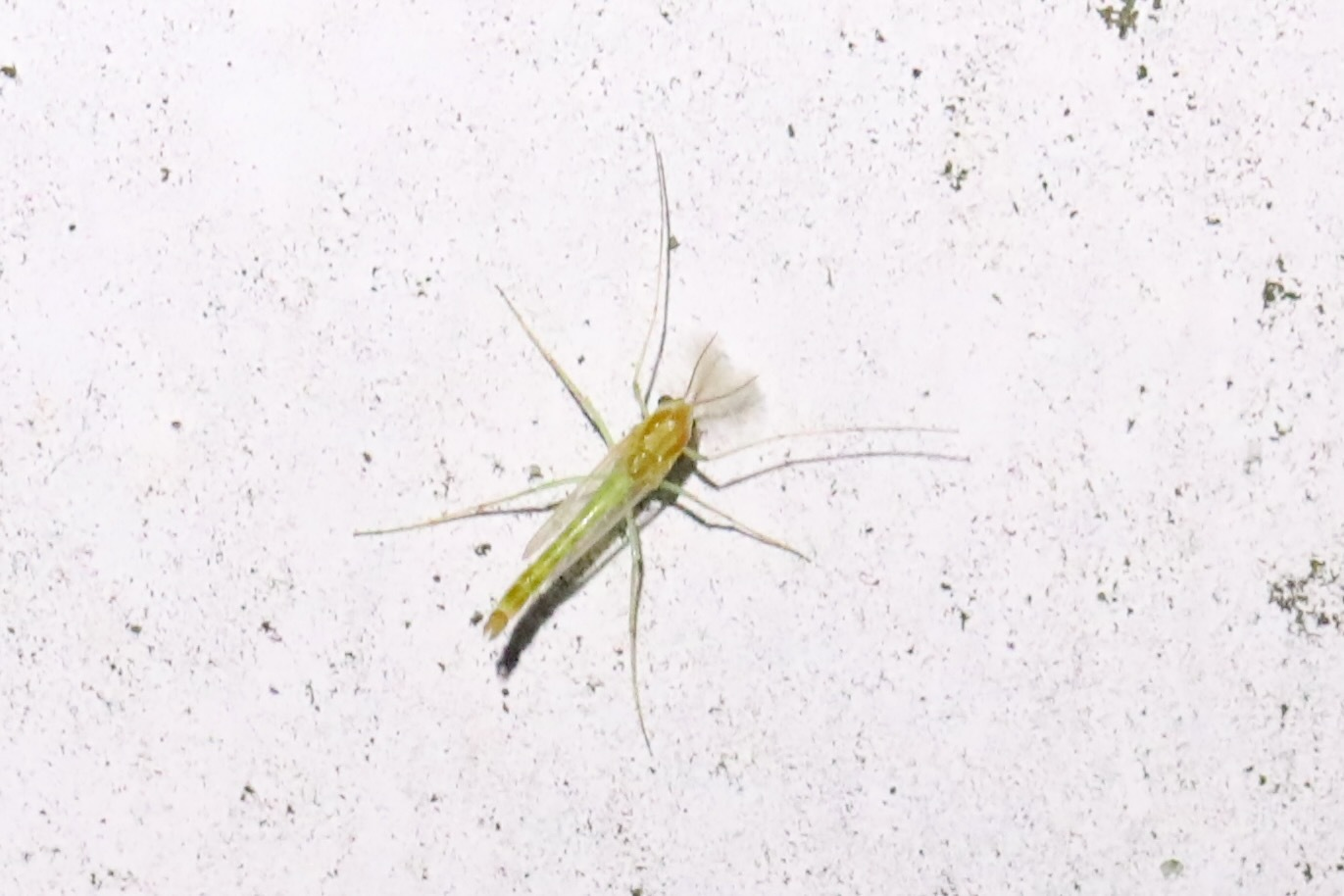
- Pseudochironomus, Wisconsin

Scientific classification
- Domain: Eukaryota
- Kingdom: Animalia
- Phylum: Arthropoda
- Class: Insecta
- Order: Diptera
- Family: Chironomidae
- Subfamily: Chironominae
- Tribe: Pseudochironomini; Saether 1977

= Pseudochironomini =

Tribe of non-biting midges

Pseudochironomini is a tribe of nonbiting midges in the family Chironomidae. There are about 6 genera and more than 60 described species in Pseudochironomini.

== Genera ==
These six genera belong to the tribe Pseudochironomini:

- Aedokritus Roback, 1958
- Madachironomus Andersen, 2016
- Manoa Fittkau, 1963
- Megacentron Freeman, 1961
- Pseudochironomus Malloch, 1915
- Riethia Kieffer, 1917
