= Pseudochironomus richardsoni =

Scientific classification
- Domain: Eukaryota
- Kingdom: Animalia
- Phylum: Arthropoda
- Class: Insecta
- Order: Diptera
- Family: Chironomidae
- Genus: Pseudochironomus
- Species: P. richardsoni

Binomial name
- Pseudochironomus richardsoni Malloch, 1915

Species of fly

Pseudochironomus richardsoni is a species of midge in the family Chironomidae.
