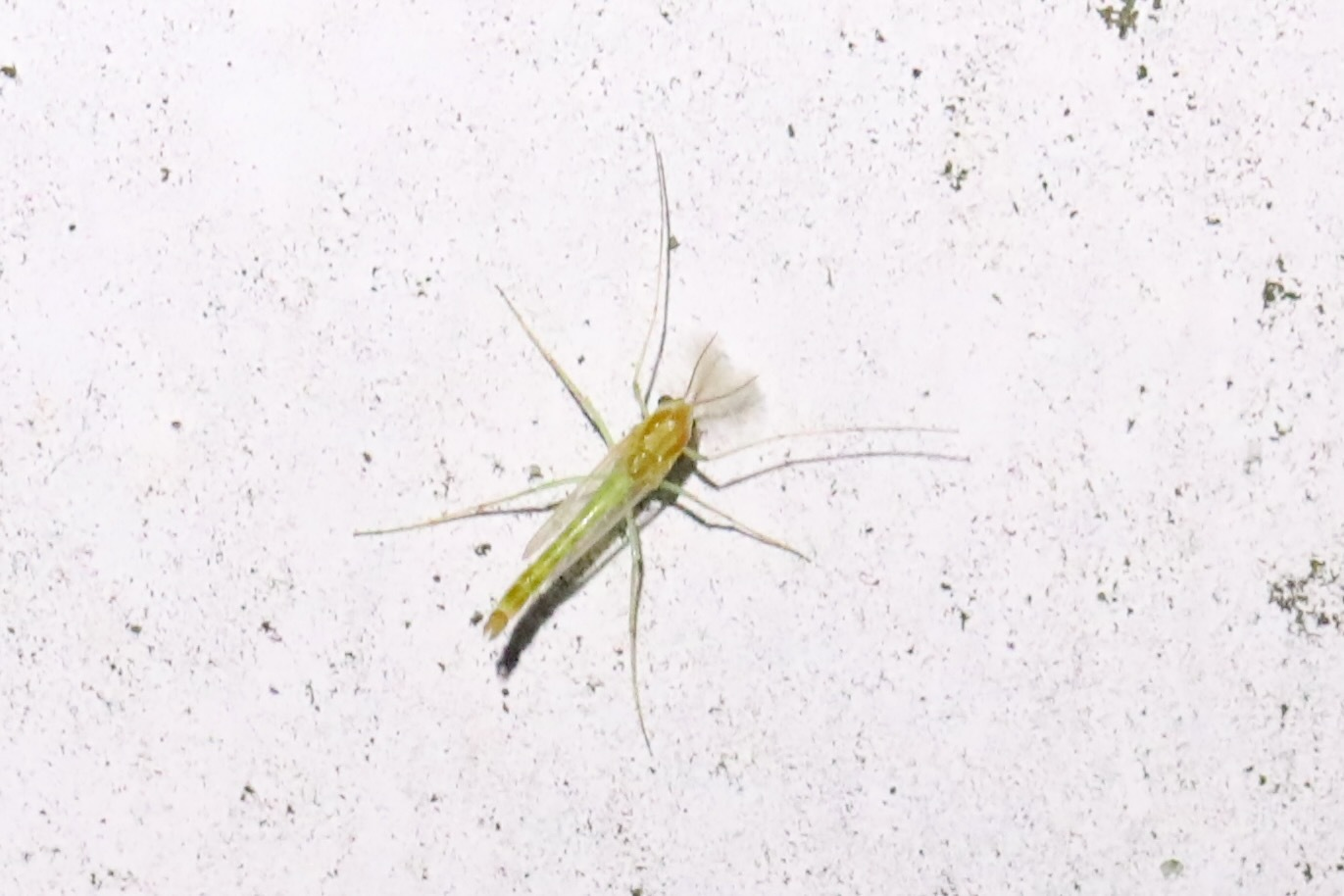
- Pseudochironomus, Wisconsin

Scientific classification
- Kingdom: Animalia
- Phylum: Arthropoda
- Class: Insecta
- Order: Diptera
- Family: Chironomidae
- Subfamily: Chironominae
- Tribe: Pseudochironomini
- Genus: Pseudochironomus; Malloch, 1915

Synonyms
- Proriethia Kieffer, 1921; Pseudochironmus

= Pseudochironomus =

Genus of non-biting midges

Pseudochironomus is a genus of nonbiting midges in the family Chironomidae. There are more than 20 described species in Pseudochironomus, found in the Americas and Europe.

== Species ==
These 27 species belong to the genus Pseudochironomus:

- Pseudochironomus anas Townes, 1945
- Pseudochironomus ariquemis Trivinho-Strixino & Shimabukuro, 2018
- Pseudochironomus articaudus Saether, 1977
- Pseudochironomus badius Saether, 1977
- Pseudochironomus banksi Townes, 1945
- Pseudochironomus boraceia Trivinho-Strixino & Shimabukuro, 2018
- Pseudochironomus capivara Trivinho-Strixino & Shimabukuro, 2018
- Pseudochironomus chen Townes, 1945
- Pseudochironomus crassus Townes, 1945
- Pseudochironomus fulviventris (Johannsen, 1905)
- Pseudochironomus fuscus (Kieffer, 1925)
- Pseudochironomus jordensis Shimabukuro & Trivinho-Strixino, 2017
- Pseudochironomus julia (Curran, 1930)
- Pseudochironomus middlekaufi Townes, 1945
- Pseudochironomus mocidade Shimabukuro & Trivinho-Strixino, 2017
- Pseudochironomus netta Townes, 1945
- Pseudochironomus nigrimanus (Kieffer, 1924)
- Pseudochironomus ploenensis (Kieffer, 1921)
- Pseudochironomus prasinatus (Staeger, 1839)
- Pseudochironomus pseudoviridis (Malloch, 1915)
- Pseudochironomus rex Hauber, 1947
- Pseudochironomus richardsoni Malloch, 1915
- Pseudochironomus ruah Shimabukuro & Trivinho-Strixino, 2017
- Pseudochironomus ruthae Andersen & Baranov, 2023
- Pseudochironomus seipi Andersen, 2023
- Pseudochironomus surianae Shimabukuro & Trivinho-Strixino, 2017
- Pseudochironomus viridis (Kieffer, 1925)
